= Spider-Man collected editions =

List of Marvel comic books

The Marvel Comics character Spider-Man (the mantle assumed by Peter Parker and various others) first appeared in 1962 in Amazing Fantasy #15. The character's various appearances have been collated into thousands of trade paperback, hardcover and omnibus collections.

== Collected editions by era ==
The core title for Spider-Man has been The Amazing Spider-Man, since the title's launch in 1963. After issue #1's launch in January, the book was released monthly.

Marvel's first attempt at chronologically collecting the core title was in 1987, with the Marvel Masterworks premium hardcover line, which reprinted 10-12 comics per book.

The next attempt was the Essential Marvel line, which reproduced comics in black and white. These books were released from 1996 to 2013, before being replaced by full-color Epic Collections.

Other than these two series, many other issues have been republished in collected form.

=== Volume 1 (1962–1998) ===
Stan Lee wrote the first 110 issues of Spider-Man, initially with co-creator, plotter & artist Steve Ditko through issue 38, then with John Romita Sr. before being replaced by Gerry Conway. Then just 19, Conway delivered "some of the boldest stories of the era", including "The Night Gwen Stacy Died" and "The Goblin's Last Stand".

By the mid-1990s, Spider-Man was in the midst of the "worst era in the character’s history”. The Clone Saga was a crossover event "involving five titles: The Amazing Spider-Man; Peter Parker, the Spectacular Spider-Man; Spider-Man; Web of Spider-Man; and Spider-Man Unlimited. It also included Giant-Size books, one-shots, and others, leaving most readers unable to follow the story."

The storyline dominated multiple titles for two years and involved Ben Reilly replacing Peter Parker as the titular character.

As well as the below, the full run of Volume 1 is being reprinted through Marvel's Epic Collection line.

#	Title	Material collected	Format	Pages	Released	ISBN
Trade paperbacks
	Spider-Man: Saga Of The Sandman	Amazing Spider-Man #4, 18–19; Fantastic Four #61; The Incredible Hulk (vol. 2) #138; Marvel Team-Up #1; Marvel Two-in-One #86; Untold Tales of Spider-Man #3	TPB	176	21 Mar 2007	978-0785124979
	Spider-Man Vs. Green Goblin	Amazing Spider-Man #17, 96–98, 121–122; Spectacular Spider-Man (vol. 2) #200	TPB	176	Aug 1995	978-0785101390
	Spider-Man/Mary Jane: You Just Hit The Jackpot!	Amazing Spider-Man #43, 259, 291-292, 309, Annual #19; Untold Tales of Spider-Man #16; The Amazing Spider-Man: Parallel Lives; Amazing Spider-Man (vol. 2) #50	TPB	272	2 Sep 2009	978-0785141853
	Spider-Man: The Death Of Captain Stacy	Amazing Spider-Man #88–92	TPB	112	1 May 2004	978-0785114550
	Spider-Man: The Death Of The Stacys	Amazing Spider-Man #88–92, 121–122	TPB	160	11 Jul 2012	978-0785167273
	Spider-Man: The Death Of Gwen Stacy	Amazing Spider-Man #96–98, 121–122; Webspinners: Tales of Spider-Man #1	TPB	112	1 Apr 1999	978-0785107163
	Spider-Man: Strange Tales	Amazing Spider-Man #100-101, Annual #14; Marvel Fanfare #1-2; Howard The Duck #1;	TPB	144	1996	978-0785102212
	Spider-Man: Son Of The Goblin	Amazing Spider-Man #136–137, 312, Spectacular Spider-Man (vol. 2) #189, 200	TPB	144	28 Jul 2004	978-0785115632
	Spider-Man: The Original Clone Saga	Amazing Spider-Man #139–150; Giant-Size Spider-Man #5; Peter Parker, the Spectacular Spider-Man #25–31, 149, 162–163, Annual #8	TPB	480	13 Jul 2011	978-0785155232
	Spider-Man: Clone Genesis	Amazing Spider-Man #141–151; Giant-Size Spider-Man #5	TPB	192	Aug 1995	978-0785101345
	The Amazing Spider-Man: A New Goblin	Amazing Spider-Man #176–180	TPB	96	12 Nov 2008	978-0785131175
	Spider-Man: Return Of The Burglar	Amazing Spider-Man #193–200	HC	168	4 Jul 2012	978-0785162650
	Spider-Man vs. the Black Cat	Amazing Spider-Man #194–195, 204–205, 226–227	TPB	128	30 Nov 2005	978-0785115595
	Murder By Spider	Amazing Spider-Man #224–230	B&W Digest	160	Sep 2000	978-0785107620
	The Sensational Spider-Man: Nothing Can Stop the Juggernaut	Amazing Spider-Man #229–230	TPB	48	1 May 1989	978-0871355720
	The Amazing Spider-Man: Mark of the Tarantula	Amazing Spider-Man #231–237, Annual #16	TPB	216	10 Dec 2013	978-0785185109
	The Amazing Spider-Man: The Origin of the Hobgoblin	Amazing Spider-Man #238–239, 244–245, 249–251; Peter Parker, the Spectacular Spider-Man #85	TPB	256	Sep 1992	978-0871359179
	The Amazing Spider-Man: The Origin of the Hobgoblin	Amazing Spider-Man #238–239, 244–245, 249–251; Peter Parker, the Spectacular Spider-Man #85	TPB	256	7 Dec 2011	978-0785158547
	The Amazing Spider-Man: The Saga Of The Alien Costume	Amazing Spider-Man #252–259	TPB	192	1992	978-0871353962
	Spider-Man: The Road To Venom	Amazing Spider-Man #258; Venom: Seed of Darkness (1997) -1; Web of Spider-Man #1; Peter Parker, the Spectacular Spider-Man #107–110, 134–136; Venom: Dark Origin (2008) #1–5	TPB	368	6 Oct 2020	978-1302926960
1	Spider-Man: The Complete Alien Costume Saga Book 1	Amazing Spider-Man #252–258; Marvel Team-Up #141–145, Annual #7, 85; Peter Parker, the Spectacular Spider-Man #90–95	TPB	464	19 Aug 2014	978-0785188674
2	Spider-Man: The Complete Alien Costume Saga Book 2	Amazing Spider-Man #259–263; Marvel Team-Up #146–150; Peter Parker, the Spectacular Spider-Man #96–100; Web of Spider-Man #1	TPB	492	12 May 2015	978-0785190035
	Spider-Man: Birth Of Venom	Marvel Super Heroes Secret Wars #8; Amazing Spider-Man #252-259, 298-300, 315-317; Fantastic Four #274; Web of Spider-Man #1	TPB	352	4 Apr 2007	978-0785124986
	Spider-Man: Birth Of Venom (alternate version)	Amazing Spider-Man #252–259, 300, 315–317; Web of Spider-Man #1; material from Marvel Super Heroes Secret Wars #8; Fantastic Four #274; Peter Parker, the Spectacular Spider-Man #100; Amazing Spider-Man #298–299, Annual #25	TPB	352	25 Jun 2013	978-0785124986
	Spider-Man vs. Silver Sable	Amazing Spider-Man #265, 279–281; Peter Parker, the Spectacular Spider-Man #128-129	TPB	144	26 Jan 2006	978-0785118824
	Amazing Spider-Man: The Wedding	Amazing Spider-Man #290–292, Annual #21; Not Brand Echh #6	TPB	144	Oct 1991	978-0871357700
	The Amazing Spider-Man: Fearful Symmetry – Kraven's Last Hunt	Amazing Spider-Man #293–294; Peter Parker, the Spectacular Spider-Man #131–132; Web of Spider-Man #31–32	TPB	160	1991	978-0871356918
	The Amazing Spider-Man: Life In The Mad Dog Ward	Amazing Spider-Man #295; Peter Parker, the Spectacular Spider-Man #133; Web of Spider-Man #33; Spider-Man #29–31 (Return to the Mad Dog Ward)	TPB	144	12 Nov 2013	978-0785185031
	Spider-Man vs. Venom	Amazing Spider-Man #298–300, 315–317	TPB	112	Apr 1990	978-0871356161
	Spider-Man Visionaries Vol. 1: Todd McFarlane	Amazing Spider-Man #298–305	TPB	208	26 Nov 2001	978-0785108009
	Spider-Man Legends Vol. 2: Todd McFarlane	Amazing Spider-Man #306–314; Spectacular Spider-Man Annual #10	TPB	224	7 Jul 2003	978-0785110378
	Spider-Man Legends Vol. 3: Todd McFarlane	Amazing Spider-Man #315–323, 325, 328	TPB	264	1 Mar 2004	978-0785110392
	Spider-Man: The Assassin Nation Plot	Amazing Spider-Man #320–325	TPB	144	May 1992	978-0871358899
	Spider-Man: The Cosmic Adventures	Amazing Spider-Man #327–329; Spectacular Spider-Man (vol. 2) #158–160; Web of Spider-Man #59–61	TPB	192	Mar 1993	978-0871359636
	Spider-Man: Venom Returns	Amazing Spider-Man #330–333, 344–347, Annual #25	TPB	200	Apr 1993	978-0871359667
	Spider-Man: The Vengeance Of Venom	Amazing Spider-Man #332–333, 346–347, 361–363, 374–375, material from 373, 388, Annual #25–26; Spider-Man Special Edition: The Trial of Venom; material from Peter Parker, the Spectacular Spider-Man Annual #12; material from Web of Spider-Man Annual #8	TPB	304	5 Oct 2011	978-0785157601
	Spider-Man: The Return Of The Sinister Six	Amazing Spider-Man #334–339	TPB	144	Nov 1994	978-0785100430
	Stan Lee Presents Spider-Man: Carnage	Amazing Spider-Man #344–345, 359–363	TPB	112	Jun 1993	978-0871359711
	Spider-Man: Am I An Avenger?	Amazing Spider-Man #348, Annual #3; Avengers #236-237, #314-318, #329; New Avengers #3; Avengers (2010) #1	TPB	288	3 Aug 2011	978-0785157496
	Spider-Man Vs. Doctor Doom	Amazing Spider-Man #349–350	TPB	56	Jul 1995	978-0785101109
	Spider-Man: Round Robin – The Sidekick's Revenge	Amazing Spider-Man #353–358	TPB	144	Jun 1994	978-0785100270
	Spider-Man: The Many Hosts Of Carnage	Amazing Spider-Man #361, 410, 431; Spider-Man #67; Spectacular Spider-Man #233; Carnage (2010) #3; Carnage USA #1-5; Superior Carnage #3-5, Annual #1; Amazing Spider-Man (vol. 4) #798-800	TPB	480	11 Sep 2019	978-1302919641
	Spider-Man: Invasion Of The Spider-Slayers	Amazing Spider-Man #368–373	TPB	144	Apr 1995	978-0785101000
	Spider-Man: Maximum Carnage	Amazing Spider-Man #378–380; Spectacular Spider-Man (vol. 2) #201–203; Spider-Man #35–37; Spider-Man Unlimited #1–2; Web of Spider-Man #101–103	TPB	336	Sep 1994	978-0785100386
	Spider-Man: Maximum Carnage	Amazing Spider-Man #378–380; Spectacular Spider-Man (vol. 2) #201–203; Spider-Man #35–37; Spider-Man Unlimited #1–2; Web of Spider-Man #101–103	TPB	336	13 Dec 2006	978-0785109877
	Spider-Man: Revelations	Spectacular Spider-Man (vol. 2) #240; Sensational Spider-Man #11; Amazing Spider-Man #418; Peter Parker, Spider-Man #75	TPB	112	Oct 1997	978-0785105602
	Spider-Man: Spider-Hunt	Amazing Spider-Man #432–433, Sensational Spider-Man #25–26, Peter Parker, Spider-Man #88–90, Spectacular Spider-Man (vol. 2) #254–256	TPB	272	27 Jun 2012	978-0785160519
	Spider-Man: Identity Crisis	Amazing Spider-Man #434–435; Spectacular Spider-Man (vol. 2) #257–258; Peter Parker, Spider-Man #91–92; Sensational Spider-Man #27–28	TPB	200	23 May 2012	978-0785106630
	Spider-Man: The Gathering Of Five	Amazing Spider-Man #440–441; Spectacular Spider-Man (vol. 2) #262–263; Peter Parker, Spider-Man #96–98; Sensational Spider-Man #32–33	TPB	248	7 Jan 2014	978-0785185291
Gallery hardcovers
	Spider-Man: The Wedding Album	Amazing Spider-Man #290–292, Annual #21; Spectacular Spider-Man Annual #7; What If? (1989) #20–21; Marvel Saga: The Official History Of The Marvel Universe #22; material from Not Brand Echh #6	Gallery HC	296	13 Dec 2022	978-1302946531
	Marvel Archive Edition: The Black Costume – Year One	Amazing Spider-Man #252–263 Facsimile Editions	Gallery HC	464	11 Jun 2025	Ron Frenz Original First cover: 978-1302965327
	Marvel Archive Edition: The Black Costume – Year One	Amazing Spider-Man #252–263 Facsimile Editions	Gallery HC	464	11 Jun 2025	Charles Vess Hidden Gem DM cover: 978-1302965303
	Marvel Archive Edition: The Black Costume – Year One	Amazing Spider-Man #252–263 Facsimile Editions	Gallery HC	464	11 Jun 2025	Ron Frenz Original Collection DM cover: 978-1302965310
Complete Epic collections
1	The Complete Clone Saga Epic Book 1	The Amazing Spider-Man #394; The Spectacular Spider-Man (vol. 2) #217; Spider-Man #51–53; Spider-Man Unlimited (vol. 2) #7; Web of Spider-Man #117–119; Spider-Man: The Lost Years #1–3	TPB	424	14 Apr 2010	978-0785144625
2	The Complete Clone Saga Epic Book 2	The Amazing Spider-Man #395–399; The Spectacular Spider-Man (vol. 2) #218–221; Spider-Man #54–56; Spider-Man Unlimited (vol. 2) #8; Web of Spider-Man #120–122; Spider-Man: Funeral for an Octopus #1–3	TPB	488	8 Jun 2010	978-0785143512
3	The Complete Clone Saga Epic Book 3	The Amazing Spider-Man #400–401; The Amazing Spider-Man Super Special; The Spectacular Spider-Man (vol. 2) #222–224; The Spectacular Spider-Man Super Special; Spider-Man #57–58; Spider-Man Super Special; Spider-Man Unlimited (vol. 2) #9; Web of Spider-Man #123–124; Web of Spider-Man Super Special; Spider-Man: The Clone Journal; Venom Super Special	TPB	464	15 Sep 2010	978-0785149545
4	The Complete Clone Saga Epic Book 4	The Amazing Spider-Man #402–404; The Spectacular Spider-Man (vol. 2) #225–227; Spider-Man #59–61; Web of Spider-Man #125–127; New Warriors #61; Spider-Man: The Jackal Files; Spider-Man: Maximum Clonage Alpha and Omega	TPB	480	8 Dec 2010	978-0785149552
5	The Complete Clone Saga Epic Book 5	New Warriors #62–64; The Amazing Spider-Man #405–406; The Spectacular Spider-Man (vol. 2) #228–229; Spider-Man #62–63; Spider-Man Team-Up #1; Spider-Man Unlimited (vol. 2) #10; Venom Super Special Flipbook; Web of Spider-Man #128–129	TPB	472	2 Feb 2011	978-0785150091
1	The Complete Ben Reilly Epic Book 1	Spider-Man: The Parker Years; New Warriors #65–66; Scarlet Spider Unlimited #1; Web of Scarlet Spider #1–2; The Amazing Scarlet Spider #1–2; Scarlet Spider #1–2; The Spectacular Scarlet Spider #1–2; Green Goblin #3; The Sensational Spider-Man #0; Sensational Spider-Man Mini-Comic	TPB	426	10 Aug 2011	978-0785155454
2	The Complete Ben Reilly Epic Book 2	Amazing Spider-Man #407–408; New Warriors #67; Sensational Spider-Man #1; Spectacular Spider-Man (vol. 2) #230; Spider-Man #64–65; Spider-Man/Punisher: Family Plot #1–2; Web of Scarlet Spider #3–4; material from Spider-Man Holiday Special; Venom: Along Came a Spider 1–4	TPB	406	9 Nov 2011	978-0785156123
3	The Complete Ben Reilly Epic Book 3	Amazing Spider-Man #409–410; Sensational Spider-Man #2–3; Spectacular Spider-Man (vol. 2) #231–233; Spider-Man #66–67; Spider-Man: The Final Adventure #1–4; Spider-Man Team-Up #2; Spider-Man Unlimited (vol. 2) #11	TPB	426	25 Jan 2012	978-0785156130
4	The Complete Ben Reilly Epic Book 4	Amazing Spider-Man #411–413; Sensational Spider-Man #4–6; Spectacular Spider-Man (vol. 2) #234; Spider-Man #68–70; Spider-Man Team Up #3; Spider-Man Unlimited (vol. 2) #12; Spider-Man: Redemption #1–4	TPB	464	1 Apr 2012	978-0785161318
5	The Complete Ben Reilly Epic Book 5	Amazing Spider-Man #414–416, material from: Annual '96; Sensational Spider-Man #7–10; Spectacular Spider-Man (vol. 2) #235–239; Spider-Man #71–72; Spider-Man Team Up #4; Spider-Man Unlimited (vol. 2) #13	TPB	464	28 Jul 2012	978-0785163831
6	The Complete Ben Reilly Epic Book 6	Amazing Spider-Man #417–418; Sensational Spider-Man #11; Spectacular Spider-Man (vol. 2) #240–241; Spider-Man #73–75; Spider-Man Team-Up #5; Spider-Man Unlimited (vol. 2) #14; Spider-Man: Revelations (with extra pages); Spider-Man: The Osborn Journal #1; 101 Ways to End the Clone Saga #1; Spider-Man: Dead Man's Hand #1	TPB	448	18 Nov 2012	978-0785165521
Marvel Premiere Classic hardcovers
1	Spider-Man: Kraven's Last Hunt	Web of Spider-Man #31–32, Amazing Spider-Man #293–294, Spectacular Spider-Man #131–132	HC	168	21 Mar 2007	978-0785123309
1	Spider-Man: Kraven's Last Hunt	Web of Spider-Man #31–32, Amazing Spider-Man #293–294, Spectacular Spider-Man #131–132	HC	168	21 Mar 2007	DM: 978-0785124009
4	Spider-Man: Death of the Stacys	Amazing Spider-Man #88–92, 121–122	HC	160	24 Jan 2007	978-0785125044
4	Spider-Man: Death of the Stacys	Amazing Spider-Man #88–92, 121–122	HC	160	24 Jan 2007	DM: 978-0785125051
31	Spider-Man: Sinister Six	Amazing Spider-Man Annual #1; Amazing Spider-Man #334–339	HC	192	16 Sep 2009	978-0785137979
31	Spider-Man: Sinister Six	Amazing Spider-Man Annual #1; Amazing Spider-Man #334–339	HC	192	16 Sep 2009	DM: 978-0785137986
97	Spider-Man: Return Of The Burglar	Amazing Spider-Man #193–200	HC	168	25 Jul 2012	HC: 978-0785162650
97	Spider-Man: Return Of The Burglar	Amazing Spider-Man #193–200	HC	168	25 Jul 2012	DM 978-0785162667
105	Spider-Man: Nothing Can Stop the Juggernaut	Amazing Spider-Man #224–230	HC	168	17 Oct 2012	978-0785162636
105	Spider-Man: Nothing Can Stop the Juggernaut	Amazing Spider-Man #224–230	HC	168	17 Oct 2012	DM: 978-0785162643
Oversized hardcovers
	Spider-Man: Kraven's Last Hunt Deluxe Edition	Amazing Spider-Man #15, 293–294, and more: Web of Spider-Man #31–32; Spectacular Spider-Man #131–132; Marvel Team-Up #128; Amazing Spider-Man: Soul Of The Hunter OGN; What If? (1989) #17; material from Sensational Spider-Man Annual '96; Amazing Spider-Man (vol. 2) #634–637; What The--?! #3	OHC	400	8 Aug 2018	978-1302911843
Omnibuses
1	The Amazing Spider-Man Omnibus Vol. 1	Amazing Fantasy #15; Amazing Spider-Man #1–38, Annual #1–2 2022 edition contains material from Strange Tales Annual #2 and Fantastic Four Annual #1	Omnibus	1,088	25 Apr 2007	978-0785124023
1	The Amazing Spider-Man Omnibus Vol. 1	Amazing Fantasy #15; Amazing Spider-Man #1–38, Annual #1–2 2022 edition contains material from Strange Tales Annual #2 and Fantastic Four Annual #1	Omnibus	1,088	25 Apr 2007	Alex Ross DM cover: 978-0785125099
1	The Amazing Spider-Man Omnibus Vol. 1	Amazing Fantasy #15; Amazing Spider-Man #1–38, Annual #1–2 2022 edition contains material from Strange Tales Annual #2 and Fantastic Four Annual #1	Omnibus	1,088	28 Aug 2013	978-0785185659
1	The Amazing Spider-Man Omnibus Vol. 1	Amazing Fantasy #15; Amazing Spider-Man #1–38, Annual #1–2 2022 edition contains material from Strange Tales Annual #2 and Fantastic Four Annual #1	Omnibus	1,088	4 May 2016	978-1302900823
1	The Amazing Spider-Man Omnibus Vol. 1	Amazing Fantasy #15; Amazing Spider-Man #1–38, Annual #1–2 2022 edition contains material from Strange Tales Annual #2 and Fantastic Four Annual #1	Omnibus	1,088	12 Jun 2019	978-1302919375
1	The Amazing Spider-Man Omnibus Vol. 1	Amazing Fantasy #15; Amazing Spider-Man #1–38, Annual #1–2 2022 edition contains material from Strange Tales Annual #2 and Fantastic Four Annual #1	Omnibus	1,152	19 Jul 2022	978-1302945633
1	The Amazing Spider-Man Omnibus Vol. 1	Amazing Fantasy #15; Amazing Spider-Man #1–38, Annual #1–2 2022 edition contains material from Strange Tales Annual #2 and Fantastic Four Annual #1	Omnibus	1,152	19 Jul 2022	Alex Ross DM cover: 9781302945633
2	The Amazing Spider-Man Omnibus Vol. 2	Amazing Spider-Man #39–67, Annual #3–5; Spectacular Spider-Man magazine #1–2; material from Not Brand Echh #2, 6, 11	Omnibus	968	18 Apr 2012	Humberto Ramos cover: 978-0785158578
2	The Amazing Spider-Man Omnibus Vol. 2	Amazing Spider-Man #39–67, Annual #3–5; Spectacular Spider-Man magazine #1–2; material from Not Brand Echh #2, 6, 11	Omnibus	968	18 Apr 2012	John Romita DM cover: 978-0785160144
2	The Amazing Spider-Man Omnibus Vol. 2	Amazing Spider-Man #39–67, Annual #3–5; Spectacular Spider-Man magazine #1–2; material from Not Brand Echh #2, 6, 11	Omnibus	968	28 Sep 2016	978-1302901806
2	The Amazing Spider-Man Omnibus Vol. 2	Amazing Spider-Man #39–67, Annual #3–5; Spectacular Spider-Man magazine #1–2; material from Not Brand Echh #2, 6, 11	Omnibus	968	5 Feb 2021	Humberto Ramos cover: 978-1302927943
2	The Amazing Spider-Man Omnibus Vol. 2	Amazing Spider-Man #39–67, Annual #3–5; Spectacular Spider-Man magazine #1–2; material from Not Brand Echh #2, 6, 11	Omnibus	968	5 Feb 2021	John Romita DM cover: 9781302927950
3	The Amazing Spider-Man Omnibus Vol. 3	Amazing Spider-Man #68–104, Annual #6–8 (covers only)	Omnibus	920	17 May 2017	Mike McKone cover: 978-1302904081
3	The Amazing Spider-Man Omnibus Vol. 3	Amazing Spider-Man #68–104, Annual #6–8 (covers only)	Omnibus	920	17 May 2017	Gil Kane DM cover: 978-1302904524
3	The Amazing Spider-Man Omnibus Vol. 3	Amazing Spider-Man #68–104, Annual #6–8 (covers only)	Omnibus	920	22 Sep 2021	Mike McKone cover: 978-1302931391
3	The Amazing Spider-Man Omnibus Vol. 3	Amazing Spider-Man #68–104, Annual #6–8 (covers only)	Omnibus	920	22 Sep 2021	Gil Kane DM cover: 978-1302931407
4	The Amazing Spider-Man Omnibus Vol. 4	Amazing Spider-Man #105–142, Annual #9 (cover only); Giant-Size Super-Heroes #1; Marvel Super-Heroes #14	Omnibus	976	22 May 2019	Frank Cho cover: 978-1302915599
4	The Amazing Spider-Man Omnibus Vol. 4	Amazing Spider-Man #105–142, Annual #9 (cover only); Giant-Size Super-Heroes #1; Marvel Super-Heroes #14	Omnibus	976	22 May 2019	John Romita cover DM cover: 978-1302915605
4	The Amazing Spider-Man Omnibus Vol. 4	Amazing Spider-Man #105–142, Annual #9 (cover only); Giant-Size Super-Heroes #1; Marvel Super-Heroes #14	Omnibus	976	8 Aug 2023	Frank Cho cover: 978-1302952570
4	The Amazing Spider-Man Omnibus Vol. 4	Amazing Spider-Man #105–142, Annual #9 (cover only); Giant-Size Super-Heroes #1; Marvel Super-Heroes #14	Omnibus	976	8 Aug 2023	John Romita cover DM cover: 978-1302952587
5	The Amazing Spider-Man Omnibus Vol. 5	Amazing Spider-Man #143–180, Annual #10–11; Nova #12	Omnibus	880	1 Sep 2021	Angel Medina cover: 978-1302926991
5	The Amazing Spider-Man Omnibus Vol. 5	Amazing Spider-Man #143–180, Annual #10–11; Nova #12	Omnibus	880	1 Sep 2021	Gil Kane DM cover: 978-1302927004
6	The Amazing Spider-Man Omnibus Vol. 6	Amazing Spider-Man #181–205, Annual #12–13; Spectacular Spider-Man Annual #1; What If? #1, 7, 19, material from #8	Omnibus	792	11 Feb 2025	Keith Pollard cover: 978-1302962135
6	The Amazing Spider-Man Omnibus Vol. 6	Amazing Spider-Man #181–205, Annual #12–13; Spectacular Spider-Man Annual #1; What If? #1, 7, 19, material from #8	Omnibus	792	11 Feb 2025	Spider-Man vs Doc Ock DM cover: 9781302962142
7	The Amazing Spider-Man Omnibus Vol. 7	Amazing Spider-Man #206–223, Annual #14–15; Marvel Treasury Edition #25; material from What If...? #23-24, 30	Omnibus	680	23 Jun 2026	John Romita Jr. cover: 978-1302968243
7	The Amazing Spider-Man Omnibus Vol. 7	Amazing Spider-Man #206–223, Annual #14–15; Marvel Treasury Edition #25; material from What If...? #23-24, 30	Omnibus	680	23 Jun 2026	Frank Miller DM cover: 978-1302968250
8	The Amazing Spider-Man Omnibus Vol. 8	Amazing Spider-Man #224-251; Annual #16-17; Spectacular Spider-Man #85; The Marvel Guide to Collecting Comics; The Official Marvel Try-Out Book	Omnibus	952	1 Jun 2027	John Romita Jr. Hobgoblin cover: 978-1302971342
8	The Amazing Spider-Man Omnibus Vol. 8	Amazing Spider-Man #224-251; Annual #16-17; Spectacular Spider-Man #85; The Marvel Guide to Collecting Comics; The Official Marvel Try-Out Book	Omnibus	952	1 Jun 2027	TBC DM cover: TBC
	Spider-Man by John Byrne Omnibus	Amazing Spider-Man #189–190, 206, Annual #13; Peter Parker, the Spectacular Spider-Man #58; Spider-Man: Chapter One #0–12; Marvel Team-Up #53–55, 59–70, 75; Amazing Spider-Man (vol. 2) #1 (A- and C-stories) #2–11, 12 (A-story) #13–18; Marvel Authentix: Amazing Spider-Man #1	Omnibus	1,264	3 Sep 2019	978-1302919528
	Spider-Man by Roger Stern Omnibus	Amazing Spider-Man #206, 224–252; Annual #16–17; Peter Parker, the Spectacular Spider-Man #43–61, 85	Omnibus	1,296	26 Mar 2014	978-0785188278
	Spider-Man by Roger Stern Omnibus	Amazing Spider-Man #206, 224–252; Annual #16–17; Peter Parker, the Spectacular Spider-Man #43–61, 85	Omnibus	1,296	4 May 2021	978-0785188278
	Spider-Man The Complete Black Costume Saga Omnibus	Amazing Spider-Man #252-263; Annual #18; Marvel Team-Up #141-150; Annual #7; Peter Parker, the Spectacular Spider-Man #90-100; Annual #4; Web of Spider-Man #1	Omnibus	992	24 Sep 2024	Ron Frenz cover: 978-1302959920
	Spider-Man The Complete Black Costume Saga Omnibus	Amazing Spider-Man #252-263; Annual #18; Marvel Team-Up #141-150; Annual #7; Peter Parker, the Spectacular Spider-Man #90-100; Annual #4; Web of Spider-Man #1	Omnibus	992	24 Sep 2024	Charles Vess DM cover: 978-1302959937
	Spider-Man vs. Venom Omnibus	Amazing Spider-Man #258, 300, 315–317, 332–333, 346–347, 361–363, 374, 378–380, and more: Web of Spider-Man (1985) #1, 95–96, 101–103; Quasar #6; Marvel Graphic Novel No. 68 - Avengers: Death Trap - The Vault; Darkhawk #13–14; Spider-Man: The Trial of Venom; Ghost Rider/Blaze: Spirits of Vengeance #5–6; Spider-Man (1990) #35–37; Spectacular Spider-Man (1976) #201–203; material from Amazing Spider-Man #373, 375, 388, Annual #25-26; Spectacular Spider-Man Annual #12; Web of Spider-Man Annual #8; Marvel Comics Presents (1988) #117-122; Spider-Man Unlimited (1993) #1-2; Venom subplot pages	Omnibus	1,160	20 Sep 2018	978-1302913205
	Spider-Man vs. Venom Omnibus		Omnibus	1,160	7 Mar 2023	978-1302949808
	Amazing Spider-Man by David Michelinie and Todd McFarlane Omnibus	Amazing Spider-Man #296–329; Spectacular Spider-Man Annual #10	Omnibus	856	10 Aug 2011	978-0785157298
	Amazing Spider-Man by David Michelinie and Todd McFarlane Omnibus	Amazing Spider-Man #296–329; Spectacular Spider-Man Annual #10	Omnibus	856	3 Oct 2018	978-1302914141
	Amazing Spider-Man by David Michelinie and Todd McFarlane Omnibus	Amazing Spider-Man #296–329; Spectacular Spider-Man Annual #10	Omnibus	856	2 Sep 2021	978-1302928650
	Spider-Man by David Michelinie and Erik Larsen Omnibus	Amazing Spider-Man #287, 324, 327, 329–350; Spider-Man #15, 18, 19–20 (A-stories), 21–23; material from Marvel Comics Presents #48–50	Omnibus	888	20 Jun 2017	978-1302907020
	Spider-Man by David Michelinie and Erik Larsen Omnibus	Amazing Spider-Man #287, 324, 327, 329–350; Spider-Man #15, 18, 19–20 (A-stories), 21–23; material from Marvel Comics Presents #48–50	Omnibus	888	24 Sep 2024	978-1302959036
1	Spider-Man by Michelinie & Bagley Omnibus Vol. 1	Amazing Spider-Man #351–375, Annual #25–26; material from Spectacular Spider-Man Annual #11–12; Web of Spider-Man Annual #7–8; New Warriors Annual #2	Omnibus	1,048	11 Jun 2024	978-1302956912
1	Spider-Man by Michelinie & Bagley Omnibus Vol. 1	Amazing Spider-Man #351–375, Annual #25–26; material from Spectacular Spider-Man Annual #11–12; Web of Spider-Man Annual #7–8; New Warriors Annual #2	Omnibus	1,048	11 Jun 2024	Venom & Carnage DM cover: 978-1302956929
2	Spider-Man by Michelinie & Bagley Omnibus Vol. 2	Amazing Spider-Man #376–393, Annual #27–28; Web of Spider-Man (vol. 1) #101–103, 112; Spider-Man (vol. 1) #35–37, 45; Spectacular Spider-Man (vol. 2) #201–203, 211; Amazing Spider-Man Ashcan Edition #1; Venom: Lethal Protector #1–6; material from Spider-Man Unlimited #1–2	Omnibus	1,128	8 Jul 2025	Mark Bagley Hulk cover: 978-1302964238
2	Spider-Man by Michelinie & Bagley Omnibus Vol. 2	Amazing Spider-Man #376–393, Annual #27–28; Web of Spider-Man (vol. 1) #101–103, 112; Spider-Man (vol. 1) #35–37, 45; Spectacular Spider-Man (vol. 2) #201–203, 211; Amazing Spider-Man Ashcan Edition #1; Venom: Lethal Protector #1–6; material from Spider-Man Unlimited #1–2	Omnibus	1,128	8 Jul 2025	Mark Bagley Enemies DM cover: 978-1302964245
1	The Clone Saga Omnibus Vol. 1	Web of Spider-Man #117–125; Amazing Spider-Man #394–401; Spider-Man #51–58; Spectacular Spider-Man (vol. 2) #217–224; Spider-Man Unlimited (vol. 2) #7–9; Spider-Man: Funeral for an Octopus #1–3; Spider-Man: The Clone Journal; material from Spider-Man Collector's Preview (1994)	Omnibus	1,240	16 Oct 2016	978-1302902162
1	The Clone Saga Omnibus Vol. 1	Web of Spider-Man #117–125; Amazing Spider-Man #394–401; Spider-Man #51–58; Spectacular Spider-Man (vol. 2) #217–224; Spider-Man Unlimited (vol. 2) #7–9; Spider-Man: Funeral for an Octopus #1–3; Spider-Man: The Clone Journal; material from Spider-Man Collector's Preview (1994)	Omnibus	1,240	30 Jan 2024	Mark Bagley cover: 978-1302952952
1	The Clone Saga Omnibus Vol. 1	Web of Spider-Man #117–125; Amazing Spider-Man #394–401; Spider-Man #51–58; Spectacular Spider-Man (vol. 2) #217–224; Spider-Man Unlimited (vol. 2) #7–9; Spider-Man: Funeral for an Octopus #1–3; Spider-Man: The Clone Journal; material from Spider-Man Collector's Preview (1994)	Omnibus	1,240	30 Jan 2024	Ron Lim DM cover: 978-1302952969
2	The Clone Saga Omnibus Vol. 2	Amazing Spider-Man #402–406, Spider-Man #59–63, Spectacular Spider-Man (vol. 2) #225–229, Web of Spider-Man #126–129, Venom Super Special; New Warriors #61–66; Spider-Man: The Jackal Files; Spider-Man: Maximum Clonage Alpha and Omega; Spider-Man Unlimited (vol. 2) #10; Spider-Man Team-Up #1; Spider-Man: The Lost Years #1–3; Spider-Man: The Parker Years	Omnibus	1,288	14 Nov 2017	978-1302907983
2	The Clone Saga Omnibus Vol. 2	Amazing Spider-Man #402–406, Spider-Man #59–63, Spectacular Spider-Man (vol. 2) #225–229, Web of Spider-Man #126–129, Venom Super Special; New Warriors #61–66; Spider-Man: The Jackal Files; Spider-Man: Maximum Clonage Alpha and Omega; Spider-Man Unlimited (vol. 2) #10; Spider-Man Team-Up #1; Spider-Man: The Lost Years #1–3; Spider-Man: The Parker Years	Omnibus	1,288	12 Mar 2024	Sal Buscema cover: 978-1302955847
2	The Clone Saga Omnibus Vol. 2	Amazing Spider-Man #402–406, Spider-Man #59–63, Spectacular Spider-Man (vol. 2) #225–229, Web of Spider-Man #126–129, Venom Super Special; New Warriors #61–66; Spider-Man: The Jackal Files; Spider-Man: Maximum Clonage Alpha and Omega; Spider-Man Unlimited (vol. 2) #10; Spider-Man Team-Up #1; Spider-Man: The Lost Years #1–3; Spider-Man: The Parker Years	Omnibus	1,288	12 Mar 2024	Mark Bagley DM cover: 978-1302955854
1	Spider-Man: Ben Reilly Omnibus Vol. 1	Web of Scarlet Spider #1–4; Amazing Scarlet Spider #1–2; Scarlet Spider (1995) #1–2; Spectacular Scarlet Spider #1–2; Scarlet Spider Unlimited #1; Green Goblin #3; Sensational Spider-Man #0–3, Wizard mini-comic; Amazing Spider-Man #407–410, Annual '96; Spider-Man #64–67; New Warriors #67; Spectacular Spider-Man #230–233; Spider-Man/Punisher: Family Plot #1–2; Spider-Man Holiday Special 1995; Spider-Man: The Final Adventure #1–4; Spider-Man Unlimited (1993) #11; Spider-Man Team-Up #2–3; material from Venom: Along Came a Spider #1–4	Omnibus	1,304	15 Jan 2019	978-1302913854
1	Spider-Man: Ben Reilly Omnibus Vol. 1		Omnibus	1,304	26 Dec 2023	Steven Butler cover: 978-1302952884
1	Spider-Man: Ben Reilly Omnibus Vol. 1		Omnibus	1,304	26 Dec 2023	Dan Jurgens DM cover: 978-1302952891
2	Spider-Man: Ben Reilly Omnibus Vol. 2	Sensational Spider-Man (1996) #4–11; Amazing Spider-Man #411–418; Spider-Man #68–75; Spectacular Spider-Man (vol. 2) #234–241; Spider-Man Unlimited (vol. 2) #12–14; Spider-Man: Redemption #1–4; Daredevil #354; Spider-Man Team-Up #4–5; Spider-Man: Revelations trade paperback (1997); Spider-Man: The Osborn Journal; 101 Ways to End the Clone Saga; Dead Man's Hand	Omnibus	1,304	23 Sep 2020	978-1302925208
2	Spider-Man: Ben Reilly Omnibus Vol. 2	Sensational Spider-Man (1996) #4–11; Amazing Spider-Man #411–418; Spider-Man #68–75; Spectacular Spider-Man (vol. 2) #234–241; Spider-Man Unlimited (vol. 2) #12–14; Spider-Man: Redemption #1–4; Daredevil #354; Spider-Man Team-Up #4–5; Spider-Man: Revelations trade paperback (1997); Spider-Man: The Osborn Journal; 101 Ways to End the Clone Saga; Dead Man's Hand	Omnibus	1,304	6 Feb 2024	Luke Ross cover: 978-1302955823
2	Spider-Man: Ben Reilly Omnibus Vol. 2	Sensational Spider-Man (1996) #4–11; Amazing Spider-Man #411–418; Spider-Man #68–75; Spectacular Spider-Man (vol. 2) #234–241; Spider-Man Unlimited (vol. 2) #12–14; Spider-Man: Redemption #1–4; Daredevil #354; Spider-Man Team-Up #4–5; Spider-Man: Revelations trade paperback (1997); Spider-Man: The Osborn Journal; 101 Ways to End the Clone Saga; Dead Man's Hand	Omnibus	1,304	6 Feb 2024	John Romita Jr. DM cover: 978-1302955830

=== Volume 2 (1998–2013) ===
After relaunching in November 1998 (with a cover date of January 1999), Volume 2 of The Amazing Spider-Man was dominated by six years of J. Michael Straczynski (2001–2007) and then 10 years of Dan Slott (2008–2018).

The One More Day story arc saw Peter Parker lose Mary Jane from his life, before a three times-a-month Brand New Day relaunch. Despite criticism of the change in direction, writer Slott said: "I see a lot of online fans out there saying that 20 years of continuity have been wiped. And that's so not the case. This isn't a 'Crisis' or a reboot."

As well as the below, the full run of Volume 2 is being reprinted through Marvel's Modern Era Epic Collection line.

#	Title	Material collected	Legacy	Format	Pages	Released	ISBN
1	Spider-Man: The Next Chapter Vol. 1	Amazing Spider-Man (vol. 2) #1–6, Annual '98; Peter Parker, Spider-Man (vol. 2) #1–6; Thor (vol. 2) #8	#442-447	TPB	392	7 Sep 2011	978-0785157595
2	Spider-Man: The Next Chapter Vol. 2	Amazing Spider-Man (vol. 2) #7–12; Peter Parker, Spider-Man (vol. 2) #7–12, Annual '99	#448-453	TPB	368	22 Feb 2012	978-0785159667
3	Spider-Man: The Next Chapter Vol. 3	Amazing Spider-Man (vol. 2) #13–19, Annual 2000; Peter Parker, Spider-Man (vol. 2) #13–19; Spider-Woman (vol. 3) #9	#454-460	TPB	400	12 Aug 2012	978-0785159773
	Spider-Man: Revenge Of The Green Goblin	Amazing Spider-Man (vol. 2) #20–29; Peter Parker, Spider-Man (vol. 2) #25, 29; Spider-Man: Revenge of the Green Goblin #1–3	#461-470	TPB	440	12 Sep 2017	978-1302907006
1	Coming Home	Amazing Spider-Man (vol. 2) #30–35	#471-476	TPB	152	17 Dec 2001	978-0785108061
2	Revelations	Amazing Spider-Man (vol. 2) #36–39	#477-480	TPB	96	6 Sep 2002	978-0785108771
3	Until the Stars Turn Cold	Amazing Spider-Man (vol. 2) #40–45	#481-486	TPB	144	23 Dec 2002	978-0785110750
4	The Life And Death Of Spiders	Amazing Spider-Man (vol. 2) #46–50	#487-491	TPB	120	16 Jun 2003	978-0785110972
5	Unintended Consequences	Amazing Spider-Man (vol. 2) #51–56	#492-497	TPB	144	27 Oct 2003	978-0785110989
6	Happy Birthday	Amazing Spider-Man (vol. 2) #57–58; Amazing Spider-Man #500–502	#498-502	TPB	136	1 May 2004	978-0785113430
7	Book Of Ezekiel	Amazing Spider-Man #503–508	#503-508	TPB	136	1 May 2004	978-0785115250
8	Sins Past	Amazing Spider-Man #509–514	#509-514	TPB	144	9 Feb 2005	978-0785115090
9	Skin Deep	Amazing Spider-Man #515–518	#515-518	TPB	96	8 Jun 2005	978-0785116424
10	New Avengers	Amazing Spider-Man #519–524	#519-524	TPB	144	8 Feb 2006	978-0785117643
	Spider-Man: The Other	Amazing Spider-Man #525–528; Friendly Neighborhood Spider-Man #1–4; Marvel Knights Spider-Man #19–22	#525-528	TPB	288	4 Apr 2007	Red Costume: 978-0785117650
	Spider-Man: The Other	Amazing Spider-Man #525–528; Friendly Neighborhood Spider-Man #1–4; Marvel Knights Spider-Man #19–22	#525-528	TPB	288	4 Apr 2007	Black Costume: 978-0785128120
	The Road To Civil War	Amazing Spider-Man #529–531; Fantastic Four #536–537; New Avengers: Illuminati #1	#529-531	TPB	120	21 Feb 2007	978-0785119746
	Civil War: Amazing Spider-Man	Amazing Spider-Man #532–538	#532-538	TPB	168	2 May 2007	978-0785122371
	Spider-Man: Back In Black	Amazing Spider-Man #539–543; Friendly Neighborhood Spider-Man #17–23, Annual #1	#539-543	TPB	336	27 Feb 2008	978-0785129967
	Spider-Man: One More Day	Amazing Spider-Man #544–545; Sensational Spider-Man #41; Friendly Neighborhood Spider-Man #24	#544-545	HC	136	9 Apr 2008	978-0785126331
	Spider-Man: One More Day	Amazing Spider-Man #544–545; Sensational Spider-Man #41; Friendly Neighborhood Spider-Man #24	#544-545	TPB	136	27 Aug 2008	978-0785126348
1	Brand New Day Vol. 1	Amazing Spider-Man #546–551; FCBD 2007: Amazing Spider-Man; Venom Super Special	#546-551	HC	200	4 Jun 2008	978-0785128434
1	Brand New Day Vol. 1	Amazing Spider-Man #546–551; FCBD 2007: Amazing Spider-Man; Venom Super Special	#546-551	TPB	200	29 Oct 2008	978-0785128458
2	Brand New Day Vol. 2	Amazing Spider-Man #552–558	#552-558	HC	168	30 Jul 2008	978-0785128441
2	Brand New Day Vol. 2	Amazing Spider-Man #552–558	#552-558	TPB	168	31 Dec 2008	978-0785128465
3	Brand New Day Vol. 3	Amazing Spider-Man #559–563	#559-563	HC	120	1 Oct 2008	978-0785132158
3	Brand New Day Vol. 3	Amazing Spider-Man #559–563	#559-563	TPB	120	25 Feb 2009	978-0785132424
4	Kraven's First Hunt	Amazing Spider-Man #564–567	#564-567	HC	112	3 Dec 2008	978-0785132165
4	Kraven's First Hunt	Amazing Spider-Man #564–567	#564-567	TPB	112	29 Apr 2009	978-0785132431
5	New Ways To Die	Amazing Spider-Man #568–573	#568-573	HC	192	4 Feb 2009	978-0785132172
5	New Ways To Die	Amazing Spider-Man #568–573	#568-573	TPB	192	1 Jul 2009	978-0785132448
6	Crime and Punisher	Amazing Spider-Man #574–577; "Death of a Wise Guy" from Spider-Man: Brand New Day – Extra! #1	#574-577	HC	136	18 Mar 2009	978-0785133933
6	Crime and Punisher	Amazing Spider-Man #574–577; "Death of a Wise Guy" from Spider-Man: Brand New Day – Extra! #1	#574-577	TPB	136	19 Aug 2009	978-0785134176
7	Death and Dating	Amazing Spider-Man #578–583, Annual #35 (co-numbered as #1)	#578-583	HC	184	20 May 2009	978-0785133940
7	Death and Dating	Amazing Spider-Man #578–583, Annual #35 (co-numbered as #1)	#578-583	TPB	184	1 Sep 2009	978-0785134183
8	Election Day	Amazing Spider-Man #583–588; "Black and White" from Amazing Spider-Man: Extra! #2; "With Great Responsibility Comes Great Power" from Amazing Spider-Man: Extra! #3; "Gettysburg Distress" from Presidents' Day Celebration #1 (digital comic)	#583-588	HC	184	15 Jul 2009	978-0785141310
8	Election Day	Amazing Spider-Man #583–588; "Black and White" from Amazing Spider-Man: Extra! #2; "With Great Responsibility Comes Great Power" from Amazing Spider-Man: Extra! #3; "Gettysburg Distress" from Presidents' Day Celebration #1 (digital comic)	#583-588	TPB	184	27 Jan 2010	978-0785134190
9	24/7	Amazing Spider-Man #589–594; "Birthday Boy" from Amazing Spider-Man: Extra! #2	#589-594	HC	176	16 Sep 2009	978-0785133964
9	24/7	Amazing Spider-Man #589–594; "Birthday Boy" from Amazing Spider-Man: Extra! #2	#589-594	TPB	176	24 Feb 2010	978-0785134206
10	American Son	Amazing Spider-Man #595–599; "Nice Things" from Amazing Spider-Man: Extra! #3	#595-599	HC	136	11 Nov 2009	978-0785138709
10	American Son	Amazing Spider-Man #595–599; "Nice Things" from Amazing Spider-Man: Extra! #3	#595-599	TPB	136	17 Mar 2010	978-0785140832
11	Died In Your Arms Tonight	Amazing Spider-Man #600–601, Annual #36; "Just An Old Sweet Song" from Amazing Spider-Man Family #7	#600-601	HC	200	25 Nov 2009	978-0785144595
11	Died In Your Arms Tonight	Amazing Spider-Man #600–601, Annual #36; "Just An Old Sweet Song" from Amazing Spider-Man Family #7	#600-601	TPB	200	27 Apr 2010	978-0785144854
12	Red-Headed Stranger	Amazing Spider-Man #602–605	#602-605	HC	128	23 Dec 2009	978-0785141587
12	Red-Headed Stranger	Amazing Spider-Man #602–605	#602-605	TPB	128	26 May 2010	978-0785138693
13	Return Of The Black Cat	Amazing Spider-Man #606–611; "Echoes" from Web of Spider-Man (vol. 2) #1	#606-611	HC	168	27 Jun 2010	978-0785142492
13	Return Of The Black Cat	Amazing Spider-Man #606–611; "Echoes" from Web of Spider-Man (vol. 2) #1	#606-611	TPB	168	23 Jun 2010	978-0785138686
14	The Gauntlet Book 1 – Electro And Sandman	Amazing Spider-Man #612–616; Dark Reign: The List - Amazing Spider-Man; "Origins: Electro" from Web of Spider-Man (vol. 2) #2	#612-616	HC	176	3 Mar 2010	978-0785142645
14	The Gauntlet Book 1 – Electro And Sandman	Amazing Spider-Man #612–616; Dark Reign: The List - Amazing Spider-Man; "Origins: Electro" from Web of Spider-Man (vol. 2) #2	#612-616	TPB	176	28 Jul 2010	978-0785138716
15	The Gauntlet Book 2 – Rhino And Mysterio	Amazing Spider-Man #617–621; "Origins: Rhino" from Web of Spider-Man (vol. 2) #3; "Origins: Mysterio" from Web of Spider-Man (vol. 2) #4	#617-621	HC	160	28 Apr 2010	978-0785142652
15	The Gauntlet Book 2 – Rhino And Mysterio	Amazing Spider-Man #617–621; "Origins: Rhino" from Web of Spider-Man (vol. 2) #3; "Origins: Mysterio" from Web of Spider-Man (vol. 2) #4	#617-621	TPB	160	15 Sep 2010	978-0785138723
16	The Gauntlet Book 3 – Vulture And Morbius	Amazing Spider-Man #622–625; "Origins: Vulture" from Web of Spider-Man (vol. 2) #5	#622-625	HC	128	2 Jun 2010	978-0785146117
16	The Gauntlet Book 3 – Vulture And Morbius	Amazing Spider-Man #622–625; "Origins: Vulture" from Web of Spider-Man (vol. 2) #5	#622-625	TPB	128	3 Nov 2010	978-0785146124
17	The Gauntlet Book 4 – Juggernaut	Amazing Spider-Man #229–230, 626–629	#626-629	HC	152	18 Aug 2010	978-0785146131
17	The Gauntlet Book 4 – Juggernaut	Amazing Spider-Man #229–230, 626–629	#626-629	TPB	152	19 Jan 2011	978-0785146148
18	The Gauntlet Book 5 – Lizard	Amazing Spider-Man #630–633; Web of Spider-Man (vol. 2) #6	#630-633	HC	128	29 Sep 2010	978-0785146155
18	The Gauntlet Book 5 – Lizard	Amazing Spider-Man #630–633; Web of Spider-Man (vol. 2) #6	#630-633	TPB	128	2 Mar 2011	978-0785146162
19	Grim Hunt	Amazing Spider-Man #634–637; the Grim Hunt Digital Prologue; "Loose Ends" from Amazing Spider-Man: Extra! #3 and "Gauntlet Origins: Kraven" from Web of Spider-Man (vol. 2) #7	#634-637	HC	128	20 Oct 2010	978-0785146179
19	Grim Hunt	Amazing Spider-Man #634–637; the Grim Hunt Digital Prologue; "Loose Ends" from Amazing Spider-Man: Extra! #3 and "Gauntlet Origins: Kraven" from Web of Spider-Man (vol. 2) #7	#634-637	TPB	128	16 Mar 2011	978-0785146186
20	One Moment In Time	Amazing Spider-Man #638–641	#638-641	HC	162	24 Jan 2011	978-0785149309
20	One Moment In Time	Amazing Spider-Man #638–641	#638-641	TPB	162	27 Apr 2011	978-0785146209
21	Origin Of The Species	Amazing Spider-Man #642–647	#642-647	HC	224	19 Jan 2011	978-0785146216
21	Origin Of The Species	Amazing Spider-Man #642–647	#642-647	TPB	224	27 Jul 2011	978-0785146223
22	Big Time	Amazing Spider-Man #648–651	#648-651	HC	128	16 Feb 2011	978-0785146230
22	Big Time	Amazing Spider-Man #648–651	#648-651	TPB	128	17 Aug 2011	978-0785146247
23	Matters Of Life And Death	Amazing Spider-Man #652–657	#652-657	HC	144	1 Jun 2011	978-0785151029
23	Matters Of Life And Death	Amazing Spider-Man #652–657	#652-657	TPB	144	23 Nov 2011	978-0785151036
24	The Fantastic Spider-Man	Amazing Spider-Man #658–662	#658-662	HC	160	24 Aug 2011	978-0785151067
24	The Fantastic Spider-Man	Amazing Spider-Man #658–662	#658-662	TPB	160	14 Mar 2012	978-0785151074
25	The Return Of Anti-Venom	Amazing Spider-Man #663–665	#663-665	HC	120	19 Oct 2011	978-0785151081
25	The Return Of Anti-Venom	Amazing Spider-Man #663–665	#663-665	TPB	120	18 Apr 2012	978-0785151098
26	Spider-Island	Amazing Spider-Man #666–673; Venom #6–8; Spider-Island: Deadly Foes; Amazing Spider-Man #659–660, 662–665 ("Infested Stories")	#666-673	OHC	376	25 Jan 2012	978-0785151043
26	Spider-Island	Amazing Spider-Man #666–673; Venom #6–8; Spider-Island: Deadly Foes; Amazing Spider-Man #659–660, 662–665 ("Infested Stories")	#666-673	TPB	376	3 Oct 2012	978-0785151050
27	Flying Blind	Amazing Spider-Man #674–677; Daredevil #8	#674-677	HC	120	9 May 2012	978-0785160014
27	Flying Blind	Amazing Spider-Man #674–677; Daredevil #8	#674-677	TPB	120	7 Nov 2012	978-0785160021
28	Trouble On The Horizon	Amazing Spider-Man #678–681, 679.1	#678-681	HC	120	4 Jul 2012	978-0785160038
28	Trouble On The Horizon	Amazing Spider-Man #678–681, 679.1	#678-681	TPB	120	1 Jan 2013	978-0785160045
29	Ends Of The Earth	Amazing Spider-Man: Ends of the Earth #1; Amazing Spider-Man #682–687; Avenging Spider-Man #8	#682-687	OHC	192	8 Aug 2012	978-0785160052
29	Ends Of The Earth	Amazing Spider-Man: Ends of the Earth #1; Amazing Spider-Man #682–687; Avenging Spider-Man #8	#682-687	TPB	192	22 Jan 2013	978-0785160069
30	Lizard – No Turning Back	Amazing Spider-Man #688–691, Untold Tales of Spider-Man #9	#688-691	HC	112	10 Oct 2012	978-0785160076
30	Lizard – No Turning Back	Amazing Spider-Man #688–691, Untold Tales of Spider-Man #9	#688-691	TPB	112	9 Apr 2013	978-0785160083
31	Danger Zone	Amazing Spider-Man #692–697, Avenging Spider-Man #11	#692-697	HC	128	26 Dec 2012	978-0785160090
31	Danger Zone	Amazing Spider-Man #692–697, Avenging Spider-Man #11	#692-697	TPB	128	18 Jun 2013	978-0785160106
32	Dying Wish	Amazing Spider-Man #698–700	#698-700	HC	136	20 Feb 2013	978-0785165231
32	Dying Wish	Amazing Spider-Man #698–700	#698-700	TPB	136	1 Jan 2014	978-0785165248
	Spider-Man: Brand New Day	Amazing Spider-Man #555-557, 562-564, 574-576, material from 577, 578-579; Amazing Spider-Man: Extra! #2		TPB	328	2 Jun 2026	978-1302968663
Complete and Ultimate Collections
1	Amazing Spider-Man by J. Michael Straczynski Ultimate Collection Book 1	Amazing Spider-Man (vol. 2) #30–45	#471-486	TPB	392	22 Jul 2009	978-0785138938
2	Amazing Spider-Man by J. Michael Straczynski Ultimate Collection Book 2	Amazing Spider-Man (vol. 2) #46–58; Amazing Spider-Man #500–502	#487-502	TPB	416	25 Nov 2009	978-0785138945
3	Amazing Spider-Man by J. Michael Straczynski Ultimate Collection Book 3	Amazing Spider-Man #503–518	#503-518	TPB	408	14 Apr 2010	978-0785138952
4	Amazing Spider-Man by J. Michael Straczynski Ultimate Collection Book 4	Amazing Spider-Man #519–528; Friendly Neighborhood Spider-Man #1–4; Marvel Knights Spider-Man #19–22	#519-528	TPB	480	3 Aug 2010	978-0785138969
5	Amazing Spider-Man by J. Michael Straczynski Ultimate Collection Book 5	Amazing Spider-Man #529–545; Friendly Neighborhood Spider-Man #24; Sensational Spider-Man #41	#529-545	TPB	536	24 Nov 2010	978-0785138976
1	Brand New Day: The Complete Collection Vol. 1	FCBD 2007, Amazing Spider-Man #546–564; Spider-Man: Swing Shift - Director's Cut	#546–564	TPB	520	10 May 2016	978-0785195610
2	Brand New Day: The Complete Collection Vol. 2	Amazing Spider-Man #565–577, Annual (2008) #1; Secret Invasion: The Amazing Spider-Man #1–3	#565–577	TPB	512	2 Aug 2016	978-1302900632
3	Brand New Day: The Complete Collection Vol. 3	Amazing Spider-Man #578–591, and more: Spider-Man: Presidents' Day Special #1; Spider-Man: Fear Itself (2009) #1; Amazing Spider-Man: Extra! #2–3, material from #1	#578–591	TPB	504	27 Jun 2017	978-1302907037
4	Brand New Day: The Complete Collection Vol. 4	Amazing Spider-Man #592–601; Annual #36, and more: Spider-Man: The Short Halloween, Dark Reign: Mr. Negative #1–3; Amazing Spider-Man: American Son Sketchbook; material from Amazing Spider-Man Family #7	#592–601	TPB	504	1 Feb 2018	978-1302907990
	Amazing Spider-Man: New Ways To Live	Amazing Spider-Man #602–611, and more: Spider-Man: A Chemical Romance, Spider-Man: The Root of All Annoyance, Amazing Spider-Man Presents: Anti-Venom — New Ways to Live #1–3; Amazing Spider-Man Presents: Jackpot #1–3; material from Web of Spider-Man (2009) #1 and Amazing Spider-Man Family #6	#602–611	TPB	480	27 Mar 2019	978-1302915629
1	The Gauntlet: The Complete Collection Vol. 1	Amazing Spider-Man #612–626, Annual #37, and more: Dark Reign: The List - Amazing Spider-Man #1; material from Web of Spider-Man (2009) #2–5	#612–626	TPB	520	2 Jul 2019	978-1302918453
2	The Gauntlet: The Complete Collection Vol. 2	Amazing Spider-Man #627–637, and more: Grim Hunt: The Kraven Saga #1; Amazing Spider-Man Presents: Black Cat #1–4; material from Web of Spider-Man (2009) #6–7	#627–637	TPB	504	22 Sep 2020	978-1302925154
1	Big Time: The Complete Collection Vol. 1	Amazing Spider-Man #648–662, 654.1	#648-662	TPB	528	20 Jun 2012	978-0785162179
2	Big Time: The Complete Collection Vol. 2	The Amazing Spider-Man #663–676, and more: Amazing Spider-Man: Infested #1; FCBD 2011; Spider-Island: Deadly Foes #1; Spider-Island Spotlight	#663–676	TPB	448	6 Dec 2013	978-0785185406
3	Big Time: The Complete Collection Vol. 3	The Amazing Spider-Man #677–687, 679.1; Daredevil #8; Amazing Spider-Man: Ends of the Earth #1; Avenging Spider-Man #8	#677–687	TPB	352	10 Feb 2015	978-0785192152
4	Big Time: The Complete Collection Vol. 4	The Amazing Spider-Man #688–697; Avenging Spider-Man #11; Alpha: Big Time #1–5	#688–697	TPB	360	6 Aug 2015	978-0785192169
Oversized hardcovers
1	Best of Spider-Man Vol. 1	Amazing Spider-Man (vol. 2) #30–36, Spider-Man's Tangled Web #4–6, Peter Parker: Spider-Man #36, Ultimate Marvel Team-Up #6–8	#471-477	OHC	336	Apr 2002	978-0785109006
2	Best of Spider-Man Vol. 2	Amazing Spider-Man (vol. 2) #37–45, Spider-Man's Tangled Web #10–11, Peter Parker: Spider-Man #44–47	#478-486	OHC	368	Jun 2003	978-0785111009
3	Best of Spider-Man Vol. 3	Amazing Spider-Man (vol. 2) #46–58, 500	#487-500	OHC	368	Jun 2004	978-0785113393
4	Best of Spider-Man Vol. 4	Amazing Spider-Man #501–514	#501-514	OHC	336	Jul 2005	978-0785118275
5	Best of Spider-Man Vol. 5	Amazing Spider-Man #515–524	#515-524	OHC	240	Jul 2006	978-0785121282
	Spider-Man: The Other	Amazing Spider-Man #525–528; Friendly Neighborhood Spider-Man #1–4; Marvel Knights Spider-Man #19–22	#525-528	OHC	288	25 Oct 2006	978-0785121886
	Civil War: Spider-Man	Friendly Neighborhood Spider-Man #11–16, Amazing Spider-Man #529–538, Sensational Spider-Man #28–34	#529-538	OHC	544	26 Jan 2011	978-0785148821
	Spider-Man: Back In Black	Amazing Spider-Man #539–543; Friendly Neighborhood Spider-Man #17–23, Annual #1	#539-543	OHC	336	24 Oct 2007	978-0785129042
Gallery hardcovers
	One More Day	Amazing Spider-Man #544–545; Sensational Spider-Man #41; Friendly Neighborhood Spider-Man #24	#544-545	Gallery HC	136	18 Apr 2023	978-1302949914
Omnibuses
1	Amazing Spider-Man by J. Michael Straczynski Omnibus Vol. 1	Amazing Spider-Man (vol. 2) #30–58; Amazing Spider-Man #500–514	#471-514	Omnibus	1,120	30 May 2019	J Scott Campbell cover: 978-1302917067
1	Amazing Spider-Man by J. Michael Straczynski Omnibus Vol. 1	Amazing Spider-Man (vol. 2) #30–58; Amazing Spider-Man #500–514	#471-514	Omnibus	1,120	24 May 2022	J Scott Campbell cover: 978-1302945442
1	Amazing Spider-Man by J. Michael Straczynski Omnibus Vol. 1	Amazing Spider-Man (vol. 2) #30–58; Amazing Spider-Man #500–514	#471-514	Omnibus	1,120	24 May 2022	Mike Deodato DM cover: 978-1302945435
2	Amazing Spider-Man by J. Michael Straczynski Omnibus Vol. 2	Amazing Spider-Man #515–545; Friendly Neighborhood Spider-Man #1–4, 24, and more: Marvel Knights: Spider-Man #19–22; The Sensational Spider-Man #41; Spider-Man: The Other Sketchbook #1; Spider-Man: One More Day Sketchbook	#515–545	Omnibus	1,136	1 Sep 2020	Mike Deodato Jr. cover: 978-1302923136
2	Amazing Spider-Man by J. Michael Straczynski Omnibus Vol. 2	Amazing Spider-Man #515–545; Friendly Neighborhood Spider-Man #1–4, 24, and more: Marvel Knights: Spider-Man #19–22; The Sensational Spider-Man #41; Spider-Man: The Other Sketchbook #1; Spider-Man: One More Day Sketchbook	#515–545	Omnibus	1,136	1 Sep 2020	Ron Garney Black Suit DM cover: 978-1302924348
2	Amazing Spider-Man by J. Michael Straczynski Omnibus Vol. 2	Amazing Spider-Man #515–545; Friendly Neighborhood Spider-Man #1–4, 24, and more: Marvel Knights: Spider-Man #19–22; The Sensational Spider-Man #41; Spider-Man: The Other Sketchbook #1; Spider-Man: One More Day Sketchbook	#515–545	Omnibus	1,136	6 Aug 2024	Mike Deodato Jr. cover: 978-1302923136
2	Amazing Spider-Man by J. Michael Straczynski Omnibus Vol. 2	Amazing Spider-Man #515–545; Friendly Neighborhood Spider-Man #1–4, 24, and more: Marvel Knights: Spider-Man #19–22; The Sensational Spider-Man #41; Spider-Man: The Other Sketchbook #1; Spider-Man: One More Day Sketchbook	#515–545	Omnibus	1,136	6 Aug 2024	Ron Garney Black Suit DM cover: 978-1302957766
2	Amazing Spider-Man by J. Michael Straczynski Omnibus Vol. 2	Amazing Spider-Man #515–545; Friendly Neighborhood Spider-Man #1–4, 24, and more: Marvel Knights: Spider-Man #19–22; The Sensational Spider-Man #41; Spider-Man: The Other Sketchbook #1; Spider-Man: One More Day Sketchbook	#515–545	Omnibus	1,136	6 Aug 2024	Joe Quesada DM cover: 978-1302957773
1	Spider-Man: Brand New Day Omnibus Vol. 1	Amazing Spider-Man #546–583, Annual (2008) #1, and more: FCBD 2007 (Spider-Man); Secret Invasion: The Amazing Spider-Man (2008) #1–3; Presidents' Day Celebration Digital Comic (2009) #1; Spider-Man: Fear Itself One-Shot (2009); Amazing Spider-Man: Extra! (2008) #2; Spider-Man: Swing Shift Director's Cut One-Shot (2007); material from Amazing Spider-Man: Extra! (2008)	#546-583	Omnibus	1,280	13 Aug 2024	Steve McNiven cover: 978-1302951757
1	Spider-Man: Brand New Day Omnibus Vol. 1	Amazing Spider-Man #546–583, Annual (2008) #1, and more: FCBD 2007 (Spider-Man); Secret Invasion: The Amazing Spider-Man (2008) #1–3; Presidents' Day Celebration Digital Comic (2009) #1; Spider-Man: Fear Itself One-Shot (2009); Amazing Spider-Man: Extra! (2008) #2; Spider-Man: Swing Shift Director's Cut One-Shot (2007); material from Amazing Spider-Man: Extra! (2008)	#546-583	Omnibus	1,280	13 Aug 2024	Phil Jiminez DM cover: 978-1302951764
2	Brand New Day Vol. 2	Amazing Spider-Man #584-611, Annual (2009), and more: Amazing Spider-Man: Extra! (2008) 1 (C story), 3; Spider- Man: The Short Halloween #1 (2009); Spider-Man: A Chemical Romance Digital Comic (2009) #1; Spider-Man: The Root of All Annoyance Digital Comic (2009) #1; Dark Reign: Mr. Negative (2009) #1-3; Amazing Spider-Man Presents: Anti-Venom - New Ways to Live (2009) #1-3; Amazing Spider-Man Presents: Jackpot (2010) #1-3; Amazing Spider-Man Family (2008) #6-7 (A stories); Web of Spider-Man (2009) #1 (A story)	#584-611	Omnibus	1,240	6 Jan 2026	John Romita Jr. cover: 978-1302965907
2	Brand New Day Vol. 2		#584-611	Omnibus	1,240	6 Jan 2026	Phil Jiminez DM cover: TBC
2	Brand New Day Vol. 2		#584-611	Omnibus	1,240	6 Jan 2026	J. Scott Campbell DM Cover: 978-1302967390
3	Brand New Day Vol. 3	Amazing Spider-Man #612–647, Annual 2009; Dark Reign: The List - Spider-Man; Black Cat (2010) #1-4; The Many Loves Of The Amazing Spider-Man; material from Web Of Spider-Man (vol. 2) #2-7, 12; Spider-Man: Origin Of The Hunter; Spider-Man: Grim Hunt - The Kraven Saga	#612–647	Omnibus	1,392	9 Jun 2026	Steve McNiven cover: 978-1302968861
3	Brand New Day Vol. 3	Amazing Spider-Man #612–647, Annual 2009; Dark Reign: The List - Spider-Man; Black Cat (2010) #1-4; The Many Loves Of The Amazing Spider-Man; material from Web Of Spider-Man (vol. 2) #2-7, 12; Spider-Man: Origin Of The Hunter; Spider-Man: Grim Hunt - The Kraven Saga	#612–647	Omnibus	1,392	9 Jun 2026	Paolo Rivera DM cover: 978-1302968878
1	Big Time Vol. 1	Amazing Spider-Man #648-673, 654.1; FCBD 2011 (Spider-Man); Venom (2011) #6-9; Spider-Island: Avengers; Spider-Island: Deadly Foes; Spider-Island: Heroes For Hire; Spider-Island: I Love New York City; Spider-Island: Spider-Woman; Spider-Island: Amazing Spider-Girl #1-3; Spider-Island: Cloak & Dagger #1-3; Spider-Island: Deadly Hands of Kung Fu #1-3; Herc #7-8; Black Panther: The Most Dangerous Man Alive #524; Spider-Island: Emergence of Evil - Jackal & Hobgoblin (framing story)	#648–673	Omnibus	1,376	18 May 2027	Humberto Ramos cover: 978-1302972431
1	Big Time Vol. 1	Amazing Spider-Man #648-673, 654.1; FCBD 2011 (Spider-Man); Venom (2011) #6-9; Spider-Island: Avengers; Spider-Island: Deadly Foes; Spider-Island: Heroes For Hire; Spider-Island: I Love New York City; Spider-Island: Spider-Woman; Spider-Island: Amazing Spider-Girl #1-3; Spider-Island: Cloak & Dagger #1-3; Spider-Island: Deadly Hands of Kung Fu #1-3; Herc #7-8; Black Panther: The Most Dangerous Man Alive #524; Spider-Island: Emergence of Evil - Jackal & Hobgoblin (framing story)	#648–673	Omnibus	1,376	18 May 2027	TBC DM cover: TBC
	Spider-Man by Joe Kelly Omnibus	Amazing Spider-Man #575–576, 595–599, 606–607, 611, 617, 625, and more: Non-Stop Spider-Man (2021) #1–5; Savage Spider-Man (2022) #1–5; Marvel Fanfare (1996) #2–3; Webspinners: Tales of Spider-Man (1999) #7–9; material from Amazing Spider-Man: Extra! (2008) #1, 3; Amazing Spider-Man (1999) #577, 600, 612, 634–637, 647; Spider-Man: Grim Hunt - The Kraven Saga (2010)	#575-647 (in part)	Omnibus	880	14 Jan 2025	Ken Lashley cover: 978-1302951931
	Spider-Man by Joe Kelly Omnibus	Amazing Spider-Man #575–576, 595–599, 606–607, 611, 617, 625, and more: Non-Stop Spider-Man (2021) #1–5; Savage Spider-Man (2022) #1–5; Marvel Fanfare (1996) #2–3; Webspinners: Tales of Spider-Man (1999) #7–9; material from Amazing Spider-Man: Extra! (2008) #1, 3; Amazing Spider-Man (1999) #577, 600, 612, 634–637, 647; Spider-Man: Grim Hunt - The Kraven Saga (2010)	#575-647 (in part)	Omnibus	880	14 Jan 2025	Phil Jimenez DM cover: 978-1302951948

=== The Superior Spider-Man (2013–2014) ===
Superior Spider-Man launched in 2013, with writer Dan Slott; and artists Ryan Stegman, Humberto Ramos and Giuseppe Camuncoli. It followed the apparent death of Peter Parker, with the mind of Otto Octavius (a.k.a. Doctor Octopus) taking over Parker's body.

#	Title	Material collected	Legacy	Format	Pages	Released	ISBN
Trade paperbacks
1	My Own Worst Enemy	The Superior Spider-Man #1–5	#701-705	TPB	120	11 Jun 2013	978-0785167044
2	A Troubled Mind	The Superior Spider-Man #6–10	#706-710	TPB	112	3 Sep 2013	978-0785167051
3	No Escape	The Superior Spider-Man #11–16	#711-716	TPB	136	3 Dec 2013	978-0785184720
4	Necessary Evil	The Superior Spider-Man #17–21	#717-721	TPB	116	15 Jan 2014	978-0785184737
5	The Superior Venom	The Superior Spider-Man #22–26, Annual #1	#722-726	TPB	144	17 Jul 2014	978-0785187967
6	Goblin Nation	The Superior Spider-Man #27–31, Annual #2	#727-731	TPB	172	30 Apr 2015	978-0785187974
Complete Collections
1	Superior Spider-Man: The Complete Collection Vol. 1	The Amazing Spider-Man #698–700, The Superior Spider-Man #1–16	#698-716	TPB	512	8 May 2018	978-1302909505
2	Superior Spider-Man: The Complete Collection Vol. 2	The Superior Spider-Man #17–31, Annual #1–2	#717-731	TPB	440	11 Sep 2018	978-1302911836
Oversized hardcovers
1	Superior Spider-Man: Vol. 1	The Amazing Spider-Man #698–700, The Superior Spider-Man #1–5	#698-705	OHC	248	17 Sep 2013	978-0785185215
2	Superior Spider-Man: Vol. 2	The Superior Spider-Man #6–16	#706-716	OHC	248	24 Apr 2014	978-0785154488
3	Superior Spider-Man: Vol. 3	The Superior Spider-Man #17–31, Annual #1-2	#717-731	OHC	432	17 Mar 2015	978-0785193951
Omnibus
	Superior Spider-Man Omnibus	The Amazing Spider-Man #698–700, The Superior Spider-Man #1–31, Annual #1–2	#698-731	Omnibus	960	6 Jun 2023	Ryan Stegman cover: 978-1302951078
	Superior Spider-Man Omnibus	The Amazing Spider-Man #698–700, The Superior Spider-Man #1–31, Annual #1–2	#698-731	Omnibus	960	6 Jun 2023	Joe Quesada DM cover: 978-1302951085

=== Volume 3 (2014–2015) ===
Following the conclusion of Superior Spider-Man, The Amazing Spider-Man was relaunched with a new No.1 and Peter Parker back as the titular character. Dan Slott continued as writer and insisted that he wouldn't be undoing anything that had gone before. "If we woke up in a world where J. Jonah Jameson was in the Bugle, and Peter Parker was taking pictures for a living, and Aunt May was in the hospital, I would shoot myself," he told Comic Book Resources. "It's the ongoing story of Peter Parker, Spider-Man. His life moves forward.

"The cool thing is, I get to write the Spider-Man that Stan Lee and Steve Ditko created, that John Romita Sr. worked on, Roy Thomas, Gerry Conway, Marv Wolfman, Len Wein, Roger Stern -- everybody adds to the tapestry, and it's kind of fun to be the current guy in the line."

#	Title	Material collected	Legacy	Format	Pages	Released	ISBN
Trade paperbacks
1	The Parker Luck	Amazing Spider-Man (vol. 3) #1–6	#732–737	TPB	152	4 Nov 2014	978-0785166764
2	Spider-Verse Prelude	The Amazing Spider-Man (vol. 3) #7–8, Superior Spider-Man #32–33, material from FCBD: Guardians of the Galaxy	#738–741	TPB	120	1 Jan 2015	978-0785187981
	Spider-Verse	The Amazing Spider-Man (vol. 3) #7–15; Superior Spider-Man #32–33, and more: FCBD: Guardians of the Galaxy #1 (five-page Spider-Man story); Spider-Verse (vol. 2) #1–2; Spider-Verse Team-Up #1–3; Scarlet Spiders #1–3; Spider-Woman (vol. 5) #1–4; Spider-Man 2099 (vol. 2) #6–8	#738–748	TPB	648	10 Mar 2016	978-0785190363
3	Spider-Verse	The Amazing Spider-Man (vol. 3) #9–15	#742–748	TPB	144	8 Jul 2015	978-0785192343
4	Graveyard Shift	Amazing Spider-Man (vol. 3) #16–18; Annual (2014)	#749–751	TPB	104	26 Aug 2015	978-0785193388
5	Spiral	Amazing Spider-Man (vol. 3) #16.1–20.1		TPB	116	23 Sep 2015	978-0785193166
	Amazing Spider-Man: Renew Your Vows	Amazing Spider-Man: Renew Your Vows #1–5, Spider-Verse #2	#752–756	TPB	136	16 Dec 2015	978-0785198864
Oversized hardcovers
1	Amazing Spider-Man Vol. 1	Amazing Spider-Man (vol. 3) #1–6, #1.1–1.5, Annual (2014)	#732–737	OHC	272	1 Jan 2016	978-0785195351
2	Amazing Spider-Man Vol. 2	Amazing Spider-Man (vol. 3) #7–18; Superior Spider-Man #32–33; material from FCBD 2014: Guardians of the Galaxy	#738–751	OHC	352	19 Apr 2016	978-0785195375
	Spider-Verse	Amazing Spider-Man (vol. 3) #7–15; Superior Spider-Man #32–33, and more: Material from FCBD 2014: Guardians of the Galaxy, Spider-Verse #1–2, Spider-Verse Team-Up #1–3, Scarlet Spiders #1–3, Spider-Woman (2014) #1–4, Spider-Man 2099 #6–8	#738–748	OHC	648	12 May 2015	978-0785190356
Omnibus
	Spider-Verse / Spider-Geddon Omnibus	Amazing Spider-Man (vol. 3) #7–15; Superior Spider-Man (2013) #32–33, and more: Edge of Spider-Verse (2014) #1–5; Spider-Verse (2014) #1–2; Spider-Man 2099 (2014) #5–8; Scarlet Spiders (2014) #1–3; Spider-Woman (2014) #1–4; Spider-Verse Team-Up (2014) #1–3; material from FCBD 2014: Guardians Of The Galaxy; Edge of Spider-Geddon (2018) #1–4; Spider-Geddon (2018) #0–5; Superior Octopus (2018) #1; Spider-Force (2018) #1–3; Spider-Girls (2018) #1–3; Peter Parker, the Spectacular Spider-Man (2017) #311–313; Spider-Gwen: Ghost-Spider (2018) #1–4; Vault of Spiders (2018) #1–2; Spider-Geddon: Spider-Man Noir Video Comic (2018); Spider-Geddon: Spider-Gwen - Ghost-Spider Video Comic (2018); Spider-Geddon: Spider-Man Video Comic (2018); Spider-Geddon Handbook (2018)	#738–748	Omnibus	1,440	21 Feb 2023	Olivier Coipel cover: 978-1302947422
	Spider-Verse / Spider-Geddon Omnibus		#738–748	Omnibus	1,440	21 Feb 2023	Giuseppe Camuncoli DM cover: 978-1302947439
2	Superior Spider-Man Returns	Avenging Spider-Man (2011) #15.1, #16-22; Superior Spider-Man Team-Up (2013) #1-12; Superior Spider-Man (2013) #6AU, #32-33; Daredevil (2011) #22; Scarlet Spider (2012) #20; All-New X-Men Special (2013) #1; Indestructible Hulk Special (2013) #1; Superior Spider-Man Team-Up Special (2013) #1; Inhumanity: Superior Spider-Man (2014) #1; Superior Octopus (2018) #1 (A story); Superior Spider-Man (2018) #1-12; Superior Spider-Man Returns (2023); Superior Spider-Man (2023) #1-8; Amazing Spider-Man (2022) #31 (Superior Spider-Man story)	#740-741	Omnibus	1,264	13 Jan 2026	Mark Bagley cover: 978-1302963606
2	Superior Spider-Man Returns		#740-741	Omnibus	1,264	13 Jan 2026	Mike Del Mundo DM cover: 978-1302963613

=== Volume 4 (2015–2018) ===
Marvel Comics relaunched their entire line in 2015, offering something "All-New, All-Different". Dan Slott remained the Spider-Man writer, but promised a new suit and a new global company for Peter Parker in The Amazing Spider-Man: Worldwide. He told MTV: “Peter Parker has stepped up. He’s grown. He’s become the Peter Parker we’ve always hoped he was going to be. This company, with Peter’s inventions and Peter’s gumption has gone to new heights.”

#	Title	Material collected	Legacy	Format	Pages	Released	ISBN
Trade paperbacks
1	Worldwide Vol. 1 Worldwide	Amazing Spider-Man (vol. 4) #1–5	#757–761	TPB	144	19 Apr 2016	978-0785199427
2	Worldwide Vol. 2 Scorpio Rising	Amazing Spider-Man (vol. 4) #6–11	#762–767	TPB	136	6 Jul 2016	978-0785199434
	Amazing Grace	Amazing Spider-Man (vol. 4) #1.1–1.6		TPB	136	19 Jul 2016	978-0785196617
3	Worldwide Vol. 3 Power Play	Amazing Spider-Man (vol. 4) #12–15; material from Amazing Spider-Man (vol. 4) #1 and Annual #19	#768–771	TPB	136	6 Dec 2016	978-0785199441
4	Worldwide Vol. 4 Before Dead No More	Amazing Spider-Man (vol. 4) #16–18, Annual #1; material from FCBD 2016 (Captain America)	#772–774	TPB	112	26 Jan 2017	978-1302902377
5	Worldwide Vol. 5 The Clone Conspiracy	Amazing Spider-Man (vol. 4) #19–24	#775–780	TPB	144	23 May 2017	978-1302902384
6	Worldwide Vol. 6 The Osborn identity	Amazing Spider-Man (vol. 4) #25–28	#781–784	TPB	156	19 Jul 2017	978-1302902933
7	Worldwide Vol. 7 Secret Empire	Amazing Spider-Man (vol. 4) #29–32; Amazing Spider-Man #789–791	#785–791	TPB	160	23 Jan 2018	978-1302902940
8	Worldwide Vol. 8 Threat Level Red	Amazing Spider-Man #792–796, Annual #42; material from Amazing Spider-Man #25	#792-796	TPB	136	20 Jun 2018	978-1846539176
9	Worldwide Vol. 9 Go Down Swinging	Amazing Spider-Man #797–801	#797-801	TPB	144	12 Dec 2018	978-1302909987
Oversized hardcovers
1	Amazing Spider-Man Worldwide HC. 1	Amazing Spider-Man (vol. 4) #1–11	#757–767	OHC	280	17 Jan 2017	978-1302904067
2	Amazing Spider-Man Worldwide HC. 2	Amazing Spider-Man (vol. 4) #12–19; material from FCBD 2015: Amazing Spider-Man and FCBD 2016 (Captain America)	#768–775	OHC	232	19 Sep 2017	978-1302908423
	Amazing Spider-Man: The Clone Conspiracy	Amazing Spider-Man (vol. 4) #19–24; The Clone Conspiracy #1–5; The Clone Conspiracy: Omega – Silk #14–17; Prowler #1–5; material from FCBD 2016 (Captain America)	#775-780	OHC	512	1 Jan 2017	978-1302903268
3	Amazing Spider-Man Worldwide HC. 3	Amazing Spider-Man (vol. 4) #20–28, Annual #1	#776–784	OHC	304	1 Jan 2018	978-1302908911
	Red Goblin	Amazing Spider-Man (vol. 4) #794–801, Annual #42	#794–801	OHC	264	2 Oct 2018	978-1302913540

=== Volume 5 (2018–2022) ===
After Dan Slott's run on Spider-Man, the series was relaunched in 2018, with Nick Spencer as writer and Ryan Ottley as penciller.

Spencer said: "A lot of what I'll be doing is reconnecting Peter with some very classic, quintessential elements of the story that fans and readers are going to recognize. It's exciting to bring the character back to basics." He added that the book would provide a "fun, funny, human character-driven story".

#	Title	Material collected	Legacy	Format	Pages	Released	ISBN
Trade paperbacks
1	Back to Basics	Amazing Spider-Man (vol. 5) #1–5, Free Comic Book Day 2018 - Amazing Spider-Man	#802-806	TPB	152	27 Nov 2018	978-1302912314
2	Friends and Foes	Amazing Spider-Man (vol. 5) #6–10	#807-811	TPB	120	19 Feb 2019	978-1302912321
3	Lifetime Achievement	Amazing Spider-Man (vol. 5) #11–15	#812-816	TPB	112	30 Apr 2019	978-1302914332
4	Hunted	Amazing Spider-Man (vol. 5) #16–23, 16.HU, 18.HU–20.HU	#817-824	TPB	304	13 Aug 2019	978-1302914349
5	Behind the Scenes	Amazing Spider-Man (vol. 5) #24–28	#825-829	TPB	152	22 Oct 2019	978-1302914356
6	Absolute Carnage	Amazing Spider-Man (vol. 5) #29–31, Red Goblin: Red Death #1	#830-832	TPB	112	7 Jan 2020	978-1302917272
7	2099	Amazing Spider-Man (vol. 5) #32–36	#833-837	TPB	112	7 Jul 2020	978-1302920227
8	Threats & Menaces	Amazing Spider-Man (vol. 5) #37–43	#838-844	TPB	160	1 Sep 2020	978-1302920234
9	Sins Rising	Amazing Spider-Man (vol. 5) #44–47, Amazing Spider-Man: Sins Rising #1	#845-848	TPB	136	3 Nov 2020	978-1302920241
10	Green Goblin Returns	Amazing Spider-Man (vol. 5) #48–49, Amazing Spider-Man: The Sins of Norman Osborn #1, Free Comic Day 2020: Spider-Man/Venom (Spider-Man story)	#849-850	TPB	160	8 Dec 2020	978-1302920258
11	Last Remains	Amazing Spider-Man (vol. 5) #50–55	#851-856	TPB	168	2 Mar 2021	978-1302925871
12	Shattered Web	Amazing Spider-Man (vol. 5) #56–60	#857-861	TPB	128	25 May 2021	978-1302926052
13	King's Ransom	Amazing Spider-Man (vol. 5) #61–65, Giant Size Amazing Spider-Man: King's Ransom #1	#862-866	TPB	168	10 Aug 2021	978-1302926069
14	Chameleon Conspiracy	Amazing Spider-Man (vol. 5) #66–69, Giant-Size Amazing Spider-Man: Chameleon Conspiracy #1	#867-870	TPB	144	31 Aug 2021	978-1302926076
15	What Cost Victory?	Amazing Spider-Man (vol. 5) #70–74	#871-875	TPB	176	16 Nov 2021	978-1302926083
Issue #75 saw a soft relaunch with a new writing team and the return of Ben Reilly.
1	Amazing Spider-Man: Beyond Vol. 1	Amazing Spider-Man (vol. 5) #75–80, 78.BEY; material from Amazing Spider-Man (vol. 5) #74	#876-881	TPB	188	18 Jan 2022	978-1302932114
2	Amazing Spider-Man: Beyond Vol. 2	Amazing Spider-Man (vol. 5) #81–85, 80.BEY	#882-886	TPB	152	8 Mar 2022	978-1302932572
3	Amazing Spider-Man: Beyond Vol. 3	Amazing Spider-Man (vol. 5) #86–88, 88.BEY, Mary Jane & Black Cat: Beyond #1	#887-889	TPB	136	19 Apr 2022	978-1302932589
4	Amazing Spider-Man: Beyond Vol. 4	Amazing Spider-Man (vol. 5) #89–93, 92.BEY	#890-894	TPB	168	17 May 2022	978-1302932596
Omnibuses
1	Amazing Spider-Man by Nick Spencer Omnibus Vol. 1	Amazing Spider-Man (vol.5) #1–43, 16.HU and 18.HU–20.HU; Amazing Spider-Man: Full Circle; material from FCBD 2018: Amazing Spider-Man/Guardians of the Galaxy	#802-844	Omnibus	1,328	10 Jan 2023	Ryan Ottley cover: 978-1302946098
1	Amazing Spider-Man by Nick Spencer Omnibus Vol. 1	Amazing Spider-Man (vol.5) #1–43, 16.HU and 18.HU–20.HU; Amazing Spider-Man: Full Circle; material from FCBD 2018: Amazing Spider-Man/Guardians of the Galaxy	#802-844	Omnibus	1,328	10 Jan 2023	Ryan Ottley DM cover: 9781302946104
2	Amazing Spider-Man by Nick Spencer Omnibus Vol. 2	Amazing Spider-Man (vol.5) #44–73, 74 (A-B stories), 50.LR–54.LR, and more: Amazing Spider-Man: Sins Rising Prelude; Amazing Spider-Man: The Sins of Norman Osborn; Giant-Size Amazing Spider-Man: King's Random; Giant-Size Amazing Spider-Man: The Chameleon Conspiracy; Sinister War #1–4	#845-875	Omnibus	1,336	4 Jun 2024	Ryan Ottley cover: 978-1302953645
2	Amazing Spider-Man by Nick Spencer Omnibus Vol. 2	Amazing Spider-Man (vol.5) #44–73, 74 (A-B stories), 50.LR–54.LR, and more: Amazing Spider-Man: Sins Rising Prelude; Amazing Spider-Man: The Sins of Norman Osborn; Giant-Size Amazing Spider-Man: King's Random; Giant-Size Amazing Spider-Man: The Chameleon Conspiracy; Sinister War #1–4	#845-875	Omnibus	1,336	4 Jun 2024	Patrick Gleason DM cover: 978-1302953652
	Amazing Spider-Man: Beyond Omnibus	Amazing Spider-Man (vol. 5 (2018)) #75–93, 78.BEY, 80.BEY, 88.BEY, 92.BEY, 74 (Ben Reilly story); FCBD 2021: Spider-Man/Venom(Spider-Man story); Mary Jane & Black Cat: Beyond	#876-894	Omnibus	672	6 Jun 2023	Arthur Adams Ben Reilly cover: 978-1302949624
	Amazing Spider-Man: Beyond Omnibus	Amazing Spider-Man (vol. 5 (2018)) #75–93, 78.BEY, 80.BEY, 88.BEY, 92.BEY, 74 (Ben Reilly story); FCBD 2021: Spider-Man/Venom(Spider-Man story); Mary Jane & Black Cat: Beyond	#876-894	Omnibus	672	6 Jun 2023	Arthur Adams Kraven The Hunter DM cover: 978-1302949631
	Amazing Spider-Man: Beyond Omnibus	Amazing Spider-Man (vol. 5 (2018)) #75–93, 78.BEY, 80.BEY, 88.BEY, 92.BEY, 74 (Ben Reilly story); FCBD 2021: Spider-Man/Venom(Spider-Man story); Mary Jane & Black Cat: Beyond	#876-894	Omnibus	672	6 Jun 2023	Humberto Ramos MJ & Black Cat DM cover: 978-1302949648

=== Volume 6 (2022–2025) ===
Spider-Man was relaunched in 2022, with Zeb Wells and John Romita Jr. A Marvel press release said: "Wells and Romita Jr.'s run will bring all of the classic elements fans love, along with surprising new takes on classic supervillains from Spider-Man's rogues gallery."

#	Title	Material collected	Legacy	Format	Pages	Released	ISBN
Trade paperbacks
1	World Without Love	Amazing Spider-Man (vol. 6) #1–5	#895-899	TPB	144	4 Oct 2022	978-1302932725
2	The New Sinister Six	Amazing Spider-Man (vol. 6) #6–8, Annual #1	#900-902	TPB	136	22 Nov 2022	978-1302932732
3	Hobgoblin	Amazing Spider-Man (vol. 6) #9–14	#903-908	TPB	144	14 Feb 2023	978-1302933135
4	Dark Web	Amazing Spider-Man (vol. 6) #15–18, Dark Web #1, Dark Web: Finale #1	#909-912	TPB	168	16 May 2023	978-1302947361
5	Dead Language Part 1	Amazing Spider-Man (vol. 6) #19–23	#913-917	TPB	120	18 Jul 2023	978-1302947378
6	Dead Language Part 2	Amazing Spider-Man (vol. 6) #24–26, Annual 2023, Fallen Friend #1, material from FCBD 2023: Spider-Man/Venom	#918-920	TPB	176	17 Oct 2023	978-1302947385
7	Armed and Dangerous	Amazing Spider-Man (vol. 6) #27–31	#921-925	TPB	184	14 Nov 2023	978-1302947392
8	Spider-Man's First Hunt	Amazing Spider-Man (vol. 6) #32–38	#926-932	TPB	160	27 Feb 2024	978-1302953447
9	Gang War	Amazing Spider-Man: Gang War First Strike; Amazing Spider-Man (vol. 6) #39–44	#933-938	TPB	184	21 May 2024	978-1302954604
10	Breathe	Amazing Spider-Man (vol. 6) #45–49; material from FCBD 2024: Spider-Man/Ultimate Universe, Web of Spider-Man (vol. 3) #1	#939-943	TPB	136	20 Aug 2024	978-1302954611
	Amazing Spider-Man: Blood Hunt	Amazing Spider-Man: Blood Hunt #1–3; Amazing Spider-Man (vol. 6) #49; Miles Morales Spider-Man #21–22	#943	TPB	144	5 Nov 2024	978-1302958619
11	Going Green	Amazing Spider-Man (vol. 6) #50–54	#944-948	TPB	160	19 Nov 2024	978-1302954628
12	Dead Wrong	Amazing Spider-Man (vol. 6) #55–60	#949-954	TPB	200	25 Feb 2025	978-1302959456
Issue #61 saw a soft relaunch, with Joe Kelly taking over from Zeb Wells as writer
	8 Deaths Of Spider-Man	Amazing Spider-Man (vol. 6) #61–70	#955-964	TPB	288	25 Jul 2025	978-1302961961
Omnibuses
1	Spider-Man by Zeb Wells Vol. 1	Amazing Spider-Man (vol. 6) #1-26; Dark Web: Dark Web Finale: FCBD 2022: Spider-Man/Venom (Spider-Man story): Amazing Spider-Man Annual (2023); Fallen Friend	#895-920	Omnibus	888	10 Feb 2026	John Romita Jr. cover: 978-1302966515
1	Spider-Man by Zeb Wells Vol. 1	Amazing Spider-Man (vol. 6) #1-26; Dark Web: Dark Web Finale: FCBD 2022: Spider-Man/Venom (Spider-Man story): Amazing Spider-Man Annual (2023); Fallen Friend	#895-920	Omnibus	888	10 Feb 2026	Benjamin Su DM cover: 978-1302966522
2	Spider-Man by Zeb Wells Vol. 2	Amazing Spider-Man (vol. 6) #27-66; Amazing Spider-Man: Gang War First Strike; material from FCBD 2023: Spider-Man/Venom; FCBD 2024: Spider-Man/Ultimate Universe; Web Of Spider-Man (2024) #1	#921-960	Omnibus	1,032	11 Aug 2026	John Romita Jr. cover: 978-1302966638
2	Spider-Man by Zeb Wells Vol. 2	Amazing Spider-Man (vol. 6) #27-66; Amazing Spider-Man: Gang War First Strike; material from FCBD 2023: Spider-Man/Venom; FCBD 2024: Spider-Man/Ultimate Universe; Web Of Spider-Man (2024) #1	#921-960	Omnibus	1,032	11 Aug 2026	Ed McGuinness DM cover: 978-1302966645
	Spider-Man: Gang War Omnibus	Amazing Spider-Man (vol. 6) #39-44; Amazing Spider-Man: Gang War First Strike; Daredevil: Gang War #1-4; Deadly Hands Of Kung-Fu: Gang War #1-3; Jackpot (2024); Luke Cage: Gang War #1-4; Miles Morales: Spider-Man (2022) #13-16; Spider-Woman (2023) #1-4	#933-938	Omnibus	680	19 Aug 2025	John Romita Jr. cover: 978-1302961824
	Spider-Man: Gang War Omnibus	Amazing Spider-Man (vol. 6) #39-44; Amazing Spider-Man: Gang War First Strike; Daredevil: Gang War #1-4; Deadly Hands Of Kung-Fu: Gang War #1-3; Jackpot (2024); Luke Cage: Gang War #1-4; Miles Morales: Spider-Man (2022) #13-16; Spider-Woman (2023) #1-4	#933-938	Omnibus	680	19 Aug 2025	Ryan Stegman DM cover: 978-1302961992

=== Volume 7 (2025–present) ===
April 2025 saw The Amazing Spider-Man relaunched with a new number one for the sixth time in 12 years. Joe Kelly continued his run from the previous volume, and was joined by pencillers Pepe Larraz and John Romita, Jr.

#	Title	Material collected	Legacy	Format	Pages	Released	ISBN
Trade paperbacks
1	Get Back Up	Amazing Spider-Man (vol. 7) #1–5; Amazing Spider-Man (vol. 6) #70 (B story); FCBD 2025: Amazing Spider-Man story	#965-969	TPB	144	9 Dec 2025	978-1302960728
2	Through The Gates Of Hell	Amazing Spider-Man (vol. 7) #6–10	#970-974	TPB	112	3 Mar 2026	978-1302960735
3	Resolute	Amazing Spider-Man (vol. 7) ##11 (A story), #12, #14, #16, #18, #20-21	#975-985 (in part)	TPB	168	2 Jun 2026	978-1302960742
4	Broken	Amazing Spider-Man (vol. 7) 11 (B-E stories), #13, #15, #17, #19, #22	#975-986 (in part)	TPB	152	15 Jul 2026	978-1302536350
	Death Spiral	Amazing Spider-Man/Venom: Death Spiral; Amazing Spider-Man (vol. 7) #23-27; Venom (2025) #255-257; Amazing Spider-Man/Venom: Death Spiral - Body Count; FCBD 2025: Amazing Spider-Man/Ultimate Universe (C Story)	#987-991	TPB	248	24 Nov 2026	978-1302969059
5	Damage Control	Amazing Spider-Man (vol. 7) #28-31, 32 (A story), #33-35	#992-999	TPB	192	2 Feb 2027	978-1302965785
6	TBC	Amazing Spider-Man #1000-1002; material from Amazing Spider-Man Annual (2026)	#1000-1002	TPB	160	1 Jun 2027	978-1302965792

== Collected editions by type ==
=== Core Omnibuses ===
#	Title	Years covered	Material collected	Legacy	Pages	Released	ISBN
1	The Amazing Spider-Man Vol. 1	1962-1966	Amazing Fantasy #15; Amazing Spider-Man #1–38, Annual #1–2	#1-38	1,088	25 Apr 2007	Steve Ditko cover: 978-0785124023
1	The Amazing Spider-Man Vol. 1	1962-1966	Amazing Fantasy #15; Amazing Spider-Man #1–38, Annual #1–2	#1-38	1,088	25 Apr 2007	Alex Ross DM cover: 978-0785125099
1	The Amazing Spider-Man Vol. 1	1962-1966	Amazing Fantasy #15; Amazing Spider-Man #1–38, Annual #1–2	#1-38	1,088	28 Aug 2013	Steve Ditko cover: 978-0785185659
1	The Amazing Spider-Man Vol. 1	1962-1966	Amazing Fantasy #15; Amazing Spider-Man #1–38, Annual #1–2	#1-38	1,088	4 May 2016	Steve Ditko cover: 978-1302900823
1	The Amazing Spider-Man Vol. 1	1962-1966	Amazing Fantasy #15; Amazing Spider-Man #1–38, Annual #1–2	#1-38	1,088	12 Jun 2019	Steve Ditko cover: 978-1302919375
1	The Amazing Spider-Man Vol. 1	1962-1966	Material from Strange Tales Annual #2 and Fantastic Four Annual #1	#1-38	1,152	19 Jul 2022	Steve Ditko cover: 978-1302945633
1	The Amazing Spider-Man Vol. 1	1962-1966	Material from Strange Tales Annual #2 and Fantastic Four Annual #1	#1-38	1,152	19 Jul 2022	Alex Ross DM cover: 978-1302945633
	Untold Tales Of Spider-Man	1995-1997	Amazing Fantasy (vol. 2) #16–18; Untold Tales of Spider-Man #1–25, -1, Annual (1996-97); Untold Tales Of Spider-Man: Strange Encounter; material from Amazing Spider-Man Annual #37		808	25 Aug 2012	Pat Olliffe Villains cover: 978-0785162476
	Untold Tales Of Spider-Man	1995-1997	Amazing Fantasy (vol. 2) #16–18; Untold Tales of Spider-Man #1–25, -1, Annual (1996-97); Untold Tales Of Spider-Man: Strange Encounter; material from Amazing Spider-Man Annual #37		808	25 Aug 2012	Pat Olliffe Web-Shooter DM cover: 978-0785162483
	Untold Tales Of Spider-Man	1995-1997	Amazing Fantasy (vol. 2) #16–18; Untold Tales of Spider-Man #1–25, -1, Annual (1996-97); Untold Tales Of Spider-Man: Strange Encounter; material from Amazing Spider-Man Annual #37		808	11 May 2021	Pat Olliffe Villains cover: 978-1302928612
	Untold Tales Of Spider-Man	1995-1997	Amazing Fantasy (vol. 2) #16–18; Untold Tales of Spider-Man #1–25, -1, Annual (1996-97); Untold Tales Of Spider-Man: Strange Encounter; material from Amazing Spider-Man Annual #37		808	11 May 2021	Pat Olliffe Web-Shooter DM cover: 978-1302928629
2	The Amazing Spider-Man Vol. 2	1966-1968	Amazing Spider-Man #39–67, Annual #3–5; Spectacular Spider-Man magazine #1–2; material from Not Brand Echh #2, 6, 11	#39-67	968	18 Apr 2012	Humberto Ramos cover: 978-0785158578
2	The Amazing Spider-Man Vol. 2	1966-1968	Amazing Spider-Man #39–67, Annual #3–5; Spectacular Spider-Man magazine #1–2; material from Not Brand Echh #2, 6, 11	#39-67	968	18 Apr 2012	John Romita DM cover: 978-0785160144
2	The Amazing Spider-Man Vol. 2	1966-1968	Amazing Spider-Man #39–67, Annual #3–5; Spectacular Spider-Man magazine #1–2; material from Not Brand Echh #2, 6, 11	#39-67	968	28 Sep 2016	Humberto Ramos cover: 978-1302901806
2	The Amazing Spider-Man Vol. 2	1966-1968	Amazing Spider-Man #39–67, Annual #3–5; Spectacular Spider-Man magazine #1–2; material from Not Brand Echh #2, 6, 11	#39-67	968	5 Feb 2021	Humberto Ramos cover: 978-1302927943
2	The Amazing Spider-Man Vol. 2	1966-1968	Amazing Spider-Man #39–67, Annual #3–5; Spectacular Spider-Man magazine #1–2; material from Not Brand Echh #2, 6, 11	#39-67	968	5 Feb 2021	John Romita DM cover: 9781302927950
3	The Amazing Spider-Man Vol. 3	1967-1972	Amazing Spider-Man #68–104, Annual #6–8 (covers only)	#68-104	920	17 May 2017	Mike McKone cover: 978-1302904081
3	The Amazing Spider-Man Vol. 3	1967-1972	Amazing Spider-Man #68–104, Annual #6–8 (covers only)	#68-104	920	17 May 2017	Gil Kane DM cover: 978-1302904524
3	The Amazing Spider-Man Vol. 3	1967-1972	Amazing Spider-Man #68–104, Annual #6–8 (covers only)	#68-104	920	22 Sep 2021	Mike McKone cover: 978-1302931391
3	The Amazing Spider-Man Vol. 3	1967-1972	Amazing Spider-Man #68–104, Annual #6–8 (covers only)	#68-104	920	22 Sep 2021	Gil Kane DM cover: 978-1302931407
4	The Amazing Spider-Man Vol. 4	1972-1975	Amazing Spider-Man #105–142, Annual #9 (cover only); Giant-Size Super-Heroes #1; Marvel Super-Heroes #14	#105-142	976	22 May 2019	Frank Cho cover: 978-1302915599
4	The Amazing Spider-Man Vol. 4	1972-1975	Amazing Spider-Man #105–142, Annual #9 (cover only); Giant-Size Super-Heroes #1; Marvel Super-Heroes #14	#105-142	976	22 May 2019	John Romita cover DM cover: 978-1302915605
4	The Amazing Spider-Man Vol. 4	1972-1975	Amazing Spider-Man #105–142, Annual #9 (cover only); Giant-Size Super-Heroes #1; Marvel Super-Heroes #14	#105-142	976	8 Aug 2023	Frank Cho cover: 978-1302952570
4	The Amazing Spider-Man Vol. 4	1972-1975	Amazing Spider-Man #105–142, Annual #9 (cover only); Giant-Size Super-Heroes #1; Marvel Super-Heroes #14	#105-142	976	8 Aug 2023	John Romita cover DM cover: 978-1302952587
5	The Amazing Spider-Man Vol. 5	1975-1978	Amazing Spider-Man #143–180, Annual #10–11; Nova #12	#143-180	880	1 Sep 2021	Angel Medina cover: 978-1302926991
5	The Amazing Spider-Man Vol. 5	1975-1978	Amazing Spider-Man #143–180, Annual #10–11; Nova #12	#143-180	880	1 Sep 2021	Gil Kane DM cover: 978-1302927004
1	The Spectacular Spider-Man Vol. 1	1976-1980	Peter Parker, the Spectacular Spider-Man #1–42, Annual #1; Amazing Spider-Man Annual #13; Fantastic Four #218		928	23 Nov 2022	Sal Buscema cover: 978-1302947408
1	The Spectacular Spider-Man Vol. 1	1976-1980	Peter Parker, the Spectacular Spider-Man #1–42, Annual #1; Amazing Spider-Man Annual #13; Fantastic Four #218		928	23 Nov 2022	Dave Cockrum DM cover: 978-1302947415
6	The Amazing Spider-Man Vol. 6	1978-1980	Amazing Spider-Man #181–205, Annual #12–13; Spectacular Spider-Man Annual #1; What If? #1, 7, 19, material from #8	#181-205	792	11 Feb 2025	Keith Pollard cover: 978-1302962135
6	The Amazing Spider-Man Vol. 6	1978-1980	Amazing Spider-Man #181–205, Annual #12–13; Spectacular Spider-Man Annual #1; What If? #1, 7, 19, material from #8	#181-205	792	11 Feb 2025	Spider-Man vs Doc Ock DM cover: 978-1302962142
7	The Amazing Spider-Man Vol. 7	1980-1981	Amazing Spider-Man #206–223, Annual #14–15; Marvel Treasury Edition #25; material from What If...? #23-24, 30	#206–223	680	23 Jun 2026	John Romita Jr. cover: 978-1302968243
7	The Amazing Spider-Man Vol. 7	1980-1981	Amazing Spider-Man #206–223, Annual #14–15; Marvel Treasury Edition #25; material from What If...? #23-24, 30	#206–223	680	23 Jun 2026	Frank Miller DM cover: 978-1302968250
8	The Amazing Spider-Man Vol. 8	1981-1983	Amazing Spider-Man #224-251; Annual #16-17; Spectacular Spider-Man #85; The Marvel Guide to Collecting Comics; The Official Marvel Try-Out Book	#224-251	952	1 Jun 2027	John Romita Jr. Hobgoblin cover: 978-1302971342
8	The Amazing Spider-Man Vol. 8	1981-1983	Amazing Spider-Man #224-251; Annual #16-17; Spectacular Spider-Man #85; The Marvel Guide to Collecting Comics; The Official Marvel Try-Out Book	#224-251	952	1 Jun 2027	TBC DM cover: TBC
	Spider-Man by Roger Stern	1980-1984	Amazing Spider-Man #206, 224–252; Annual #16–17; Peter Parker, the Spectacular Spider-Man #43–61, 85	#224-252	1,296	26 Mar 2014	John Romita Jr. Hobgoblin cover: 978-0785188278
	Spider-Man by Roger Stern	1980-1984	Amazing Spider-Man #206, 224–252; Annual #16–17; Peter Parker, the Spectacular Spider-Man #43–61, 85	#224-252	1,296	4 May 2021	John Romita Jr. Hobgoblin cover: 978-0785188278
	Spider-Man by Roger Stern	1980-1984	Amazing Spider-Man #206, 224–252; Annual #16–17; Peter Parker, the Spectacular Spider-Man #43–61, 85	#224-252	1,296	4 May 2021	John Romita Jr. Hobgoblin Unmasked DM cover: 9781302928384
	Spider-Man: The Complete Black Costume Saga	1984-1985	Amazing Spider-Man #252–263, Annual #18; Marvel Team-Up #141–150, Annual #7; Peter Parker, the Spectacular Spider-Man #90–100, Annual #4; Web Of Spider-Man #1	#252–263	992	24 Sep 2024	Ron Frenz cover: 978-1302959920
	Spider-Man: The Complete Black Costume Saga	1984-1985	Amazing Spider-Man #252–263, Annual #18; Marvel Team-Up #141–150, Annual #7; Peter Parker, the Spectacular Spider-Man #90–100, Annual #4; Web Of Spider-Man #1	#252–263	992	24 Sep 2024	Charles Vess DM cover: 978-1302959937
1	Web of Spider-Man Vol. 1	1985-1987	Web of Spider-Man #1–34, Annual #1–3; Amazing Spider-Man #268, 293–295; Peter Parker, the Spectacular Spider-Man #131–133	#293–295	1,128	18 Mar 2025	Charles Vess cover: 978-1302963866
1	Web of Spider-Man Vol. 1	1985-1987	Web of Spider-Man #1–34, Annual #1–3; Amazing Spider-Man #268, 293–295; Peter Parker, the Spectacular Spider-Man #131–133	#293–295	1,128	18 Mar 2025	Mike Zeck DM cover: 978-1302963873
1	Web of Spider-Man Vol. 1	1985-1987	Web of Spider-Man #1–34, Annual #1–3; Amazing Spider-Man #268, 293–295; Peter Parker, the Spectacular Spider-Man #131–133	#293–295	1,128	18 Mar 2025	Greg Larocque DM cover: 978-1302964535
2	Web of Spider-Man Vol. 2	1987-1990	Web of Spider-Man #35–72, Annual #4-6; Amazing Spider-Man #312–313, 329; Spectacular Spider-Man #143, 146-147, 150-153, 158; Incredible Hulk #349	#312-313	1,360	12 May 2026	Bob Budiansky Hobgoblin cover: 978-1302968571
2	Web of Spider-Man Vol. 2	1987-1990	Web of Spider-Man #35–72, Annual #4-6; Amazing Spider-Man #312–313, 329; Spectacular Spider-Man #143, 146-147, 150-153, 158; Incredible Hulk #349	#312-313	1,360	12 May 2026	Alex Saviuk Spider-Hulk DM cover: 978-1302968588
	Amazing Spider-Man by David Michelinie & Todd McFarlane	1987-1989	Amazing Spider-Man #296–329; Spectacular Spider-Man Annual #10	#296–329	856	10 Aug 2011	Todd McFarlane cover: 978-0785157298
	Amazing Spider-Man by David Michelinie & Todd McFarlane	1987-1989	Amazing Spider-Man #296–329; Spectacular Spider-Man Annual #10	#296–329	856	3 Oct 2018	Todd McFarlane cover: 978-1302914141
	Amazing Spider-Man by David Michelinie & Todd McFarlane	1987-1989	Amazing Spider-Man #296–329; Spectacular Spider-Man Annual #10	#296–329	856	2 Sep 2021	Todd McFarlane cover: 978-1302928650
	Spider-Man by David Michelinie and Erik Larsen	1989-1992	Amazing Spider-Man #287, 324, 327, 329–350; Spider-Man #15, 18, 19–20 (A-stories), 21–23; material from Marvel Comics Presents #48–50	#329–350	888	20 Jun 2017	Erik Larsen cover: 978-1302907020
	Spider-Man by David Michelinie and Erik Larsen	1989-1992	Amazing Spider-Man #287, 324, 327, 329–350; Spider-Man #15, 18, 19–20 (A-stories), 21–23; material from Marvel Comics Presents #48–50	#329–350	888	24 Sep 2024	Erik Larsen Boomerang cover: 978-1302959036
	Spider-Man by David Michelinie and Erik Larsen	1989-1992	Amazing Spider-Man #287, 324, 327, 329–350; Spider-Man #15, 18, 19–20 (A-stories), 21–23; material from Marvel Comics Presents #48–50	#329–350	888	24 Sep 2024	Erik Larsen Venom DM cover: 978-1302959043
1	Spider-Man by Michelinie & Bagley Vol. 1	1991-1993	Amazing Spider-Man #351–375, Annual #25–26; material from Spectacular Spider-Man Annual #11–12; Web Of Spider-Man Annual #7–8; New Warriors Annual #2	#351–375	1,048	11 Jun 2024	Mark Bagley Web cover: 978-1302956912
1	Spider-Man by Michelinie & Bagley Vol. 1	1991-1993	Amazing Spider-Man #351–375, Annual #25–26; material from Spectacular Spider-Man Annual #11–12; Web Of Spider-Man Annual #7–8; New Warriors Annual #2	#351–375	1,048	11 Jun 2024	Mark Bagley Venom & Carnage DM cover: 978-1302956929
2	Spider-Man by Michelinie & Bagley Vol. 2	1993-1994	Amazing Spider-Man #376–393, Annual #27–28; Web Of Spider-Man #101–103, 112; Spider-Man #35–37, 45; Spectacular Spider-Man #201–203, 211; Amazing Spider-Man Ashcan Edition; Venom: Lethal Protector #1–6; material from Spider-Man Unlimited (vol. 2) #1–2	#376-393	1,128	8 Jul 2025	Mark Bagley Hulk cover: 978-1302964238
2	Spider-Man by Michelinie & Bagley Vol. 2	1993-1994	Amazing Spider-Man #376–393, Annual #27–28; Web Of Spider-Man #101–103, 112; Spider-Man #35–37, 45; Spectacular Spider-Man #201–203, 211; Amazing Spider-Man Ashcan Edition; Venom: Lethal Protector #1–6; material from Spider-Man Unlimited (vol. 2) #1–2	#376-393	1,128	8 Jul 2025	Mark Bagley Enemies DM cover: 978-1302964245
	Spectacular Spider-Man by DeMatteis & Buscema	1991-1994	Spectacular Spider-Man (vol. 2) #178–216, Spectacular Spider-Man Annual #12–14, Amazing Spider-Man: Soul of the Hunter		1,208	29 Jul 2025	Sal Buscema Green Goblin cover: 978-1302964467
	Spectacular Spider-Man by DeMatteis & Buscema	1991-1994	Spectacular Spider-Man (vol. 2) #178–216, Spectacular Spider-Man Annual #12–14, Amazing Spider-Man: Soul of the Hunter		1,208	29 Jul 2025	Sal Buscema Rhino DM cover: 978-1302964474
1	The Clone Saga Vol. 1	1994-1995	Web of Spider-Man #117–125; Amazing Spider-Man #394–401; Spider-Man #51–58; Spectacular Spider-Man (vol. 2) #217–224; Spider-Man Unlimited (vol. 2) #7–9; Spider-Man: Funeral for an Octopus #1–3; Spider-Man: The Clone Journal; material from Spider-Man Collector's Preview (1994)	#394-401	1,240	16 Oct 2016	Mark Bagley cover: 978-1302902162
1	The Clone Saga Vol. 1	1994-1995	Web of Spider-Man #117–125; Amazing Spider-Man #394–401; Spider-Man #51–58; Spectacular Spider-Man (vol. 2) #217–224; Spider-Man Unlimited (vol. 2) #7–9; Spider-Man: Funeral for an Octopus #1–3; Spider-Man: The Clone Journal; material from Spider-Man Collector's Preview (1994)	#394-401	1,240	30 Jan 2024	Mark Bagley cover: 978-1302952952
1	The Clone Saga Vol. 1	1994-1995	Web of Spider-Man #117–125; Amazing Spider-Man #394–401; Spider-Man #51–58; Spectacular Spider-Man (vol. 2) #217–224; Spider-Man Unlimited (vol. 2) #7–9; Spider-Man: Funeral for an Octopus #1–3; Spider-Man: The Clone Journal; material from Spider-Man Collector's Preview (1994)	#394-401	1,240	30 Jan 2024	Ron Lim DM cover: 978-1302952969
2	The Clone Saga Vol. 2	1995	Amazing Spider-Man #402–406; Spider-Man #59–63; Spectacular Spider-Man (vol. 2) #225–229; Web of Spider-Man #126–129; Venom Super Special; New Warriors #61–66; Spider-Man: The Jackal Files; Spider-Man: Maximum Clonage Alpha, Omega; Spider-Man Unlimited (vol. 2) #10; Spider-Man Team-Up #1; Spider-Man: The Lost Years #1–3; Spider-Man: The Parker Years	#402-406	1,288	14 Nov 2017	Sal Buscema cover: 978-1302907983
2	The Clone Saga Vol. 2	1995	Amazing Spider-Man #402–406; Spider-Man #59–63; Spectacular Spider-Man (vol. 2) #225–229; Web of Spider-Man #126–129; Venom Super Special; New Warriors #61–66; Spider-Man: The Jackal Files; Spider-Man: Maximum Clonage Alpha, Omega; Spider-Man Unlimited (vol. 2) #10; Spider-Man Team-Up #1; Spider-Man: The Lost Years #1–3; Spider-Man: The Parker Years	#402-406	1,288	12 Mar 2024	Sal Buscema cover: 978-1302955847
2	The Clone Saga Vol. 2	1995	Amazing Spider-Man #402–406; Spider-Man #59–63; Spectacular Spider-Man (vol. 2) #225–229; Web of Spider-Man #126–129; Venom Super Special; New Warriors #61–66; Spider-Man: The Jackal Files; Spider-Man: Maximum Clonage Alpha, Omega; Spider-Man Unlimited (vol. 2) #10; Spider-Man Team-Up #1; Spider-Man: The Lost Years #1–3; Spider-Man: The Parker Years	#402-406	1,288	12 Mar 2024	Mark Bagley DM cover: 978-1302955854
1	Spider-Man: Ben Reilly Vol. 1	1995-1996	Web of Scarlet Spider #1–4; Amazing Scarlet Spider #1–2; Scarlet Spider (1995) #1–2; Spectacular Scarlet Spider #1–2; Scarlet Spider Unlimited #1; Green Goblin #3; Sensational Spider-Man #0–3, Wizard mini-comic; Amazing Spider-Man #407–410, Annual '96; Spider-Man #64–67; New Warriors #67; Spectacular Spider-Man (vol. 2) #230–233; Spider-Man/Punisher: Family Plot #1–2; Spider-Man Holiday Special 1995; Spider-Man: The Final Adventure #1–4; Spider-Man Unlimited (vol. 2) #11; Spider-Man Team-Up #2–3; material from Venom: Along Came A Spider #1–4	#407-410	1,304	15 Jan 2019	Steven Butler cover: 978-1302913854
1	Spider-Man: Ben Reilly Vol. 1	1995-1996		#407-410	1,304	26 Dec 2023	Steven Butler cover: 978-1302952884
1	Spider-Man: Ben Reilly Vol. 1	1995-1996		#407-410	1,304	26 Dec 2023	Dan Jurgens DM cover: 978-1302952891
2	Spider-Man: Ben Reilly Vol. 2	1996-1997	Sensational Spider-Man #4–11; Amazing Spider-Man #411–418; Spider-Man #68–75; Spectacular Spider-Man (vol. 2) #234–241; Spider-Man Unlimited (vol. 2) #12–14; Spider-Man: Redemption #1–4; Daredevil #354; Spider-Man Team-Up #4–5; Spider-Man: Revelations trade paperback (1997); Spider-Man: The Osborn Journal; 101 Ways To End the Clone Saga; Dead Man's Hand	#411-418	1,304	23 Sep 2020	Luke Ross cover: 978-1302925208
2	Spider-Man: Ben Reilly Vol. 2	1996-1997	Sensational Spider-Man #4–11; Amazing Spider-Man #411–418; Spider-Man #68–75; Spectacular Spider-Man (vol. 2) #234–241; Spider-Man Unlimited (vol. 2) #12–14; Spider-Man: Redemption #1–4; Daredevil #354; Spider-Man Team-Up #4–5; Spider-Man: Revelations trade paperback (1997); Spider-Man: The Osborn Journal; 101 Ways To End the Clone Saga; Dead Man's Hand	#411-418	1,304	6 Feb 2024	Luke Ross cover: 978-1302955823
2	Spider-Man: Ben Reilly Vol. 2	1996-1997	Sensational Spider-Man #4–11; Amazing Spider-Man #411–418; Spider-Man #68–75; Spectacular Spider-Man (vol. 2) #234–241; Spider-Man Unlimited (vol. 2) #12–14; Spider-Man: Redemption #1–4; Daredevil #354; Spider-Man Team-Up #4–5; Spider-Man: Revelations trade paperback (1997); Spider-Man: The Osborn Journal; 101 Ways To End the Clone Saga; Dead Man's Hand	#411-418	1,304	6 Feb 2024	John Romita Jr. DM cover: 978-1302955830
1	Amazing Spider-Man by J. Michael Straczynski Vol. 1	2001–2004	Amazing Spider-Man (vol. 2) #30–58; Amazing Spider-Man #500–514	#471-514	1,120	30 May 2019	J Scott Campbell cover: 978-1302917067
1	Amazing Spider-Man by J. Michael Straczynski Vol. 1	2001–2004	Amazing Spider-Man (vol. 2) #30–58; Amazing Spider-Man #500–514	#471-514	1,120	24 May 2022	J Scott Campbell cover: 978-1302945442
1	Amazing Spider-Man by J. Michael Straczynski Vol. 1	2001–2004	Amazing Spider-Man (vol. 2) #30–58; Amazing Spider-Man #500–514	#471-514	1,120	24 May 2022	Mike Deodato DM cover: 978-1302945435
2	Amazing Spider-Man by J. Michael Straczynski Vol. 2	2004–2007	Amazing Spider-Man #515–545; Friendly Neighborhood Spider-Man #1–4, 24; Marvel Knights: Spider-Man #19–22; Sensational Spider-Man #41; Spider-Man: The Other Sketchbook #1; Spider-Man: One More Day Sketchbook	#515-545	1,136	1 Sep 2020	Mike Deodato Jr. cover: 978-1302923136
2	Amazing Spider-Man by J. Michael Straczynski Vol. 2	2004–2007	Amazing Spider-Man #515–545; Friendly Neighborhood Spider-Man #1–4, 24; Marvel Knights: Spider-Man #19–22; Sensational Spider-Man #41; Spider-Man: The Other Sketchbook #1; Spider-Man: One More Day Sketchbook	#515-545	1,136	1 Sep 2020	Ron Garney Black Suit DM cover: 978-1302924348
2	Amazing Spider-Man by J. Michael Straczynski Vol. 2	2004–2007	Amazing Spider-Man #515–545; Friendly Neighborhood Spider-Man #1–4, 24; Marvel Knights: Spider-Man #19–22; Sensational Spider-Man #41; Spider-Man: The Other Sketchbook #1; Spider-Man: One More Day Sketchbook	#515-545	1,136	6 Aug 2024	Mike Deodato Jr. cover: 978-1302923136
2	Amazing Spider-Man by J. Michael Straczynski Vol. 2	2004–2007	Amazing Spider-Man #515–545; Friendly Neighborhood Spider-Man #1–4, 24; Marvel Knights: Spider-Man #19–22; Sensational Spider-Man #41; Spider-Man: The Other Sketchbook #1; Spider-Man: One More Day Sketchbook	#515-545	1,136	6 Aug 2024	Ron Garney Black Suit DM cover: 978-1302957766
2	Amazing Spider-Man by J. Michael Straczynski Vol. 2	2004–2007	Amazing Spider-Man #515–545; Friendly Neighborhood Spider-Man #1–4, 24; Marvel Knights: Spider-Man #19–22; Sensational Spider-Man #41; Spider-Man: The Other Sketchbook #1; Spider-Man: One More Day Sketchbook	#515-545	1,136	6 Aug 2024	Joe Quesada DM cover: 978-1302957773
1	Brand New Day Vol. 1	2007–2009	FCBD 2007 (Spider-Man); Amazing Spider-Man #546–583, Annual (2008); Secret Invasion: The Amazing Spider-Man #1–3; Presidents' Day Celebration Digital Comic; Spider-Man: Fear Itself One-Shot; Amazing Spider-Man: Extra! #2; Spider-Man: Swing Shift Director's Cut One-Shot; material from Amazing Spider-Man: Extra! #1	#546-583	1,280	13 Aug 2024	Steve McNiven cover: 978-1302951757
1	Brand New Day Vol. 1	2007–2009	FCBD 2007 (Spider-Man); Amazing Spider-Man #546–583, Annual (2008); Secret Invasion: The Amazing Spider-Man #1–3; Presidents' Day Celebration Digital Comic; Spider-Man: Fear Itself One-Shot; Amazing Spider-Man: Extra! #2; Spider-Man: Swing Shift Director's Cut One-Shot; material from Amazing Spider-Man: Extra! #1	#546-583	1,280	13 Aug 2024	Phil Jiminez DM cover: 978-1302951764
2	Brand New Day Vol. 2	2009–2010	Amazing Spider-Man #584-611, Annual (2009); Amazing Spider-Man: Extra! (2008) 1 (C story), 3; Spider- Man: The Short Halloween #1 (2009); Spider-Man: A Chemical Romance Digital Comic (2009) #1; Spider-Man: The Root of All Annoyance Digital Comic (2009) #1; Dark Reign: Mr. Negative (2009) #1-3; Amazing Spider-Man Presents: Anti-Venom - New Ways to Live (2009) #1-3; Amazing Spider-Man Presents: Jackpot (2010) #1-3; Amazing Spider-Man Family (2008) #6-7 (A stories); Web of Spider-Man (2009) #1 (A story)	#584-611	1,240	6 Jan 2026	John Romita Jr. cover: 978-1302965907
2	Brand New Day Vol. 2	2009–2010		#584-611	1,240	6 Jan 2026	J. Scott Campbell DM Cover: 978-1302967390
3	Brand New Day Vol. 3	2010	Amazing Spider-Man #612–647, Annual 2009; Dark Reign: The List - Spider-Man; Black Cat (2010) #1-4; The Many Loves of the Amazing Spider-Man; material from Web Of Spider-Man (vol. 2) #2-7, 12; Spider-Man: Origin of the Hunter; Spider-Man: Grim Hunt - The Kraven Saga	#612–647	1,392	9 Jun 2026	Steve McNiven cover: 978-1302968861
3	Brand New Day Vol. 3	2010	Amazing Spider-Man #612–647, Annual 2009; Dark Reign: The List - Spider-Man; Black Cat (2010) #1-4; The Many Loves of the Amazing Spider-Man; material from Web Of Spider-Man (vol. 2) #2-7, 12; Spider-Man: Origin of the Hunter; Spider-Man: Grim Hunt - The Kraven Saga	#612–647	1,392	9 Jun 2026	Paolo Rivera DM cover: 978-1302968878
1	Big Time Vol. 1	2010-2011	Amazing Spider-Man #648-673, 654.1; FCBD 2011 (Spider-Man); Venom (2011) #6-9; Spider-Island: Avengers; Spider-Island: Deadly Foes; Spider-Island: Heroes For Hire; Spider-Island: I Love New York City; Spider-Island: Spider-Woman; Spider-Island: Amazing Spider-Girl #1-3; Spider-Island: Cloak & Dagger #1-3; Spider-Island: Deadly Hands of Kung Fu #1-3; Herc #7-8; Black Panther: The Most Dangerous Man Alive #524; Spider-Island: Emergence of Evil - Jackal & Hobgoblin (framing story)	#648–673	1,376	18 May 2027	Humberto Ramos cover: 978-1302972431
1	Big Time Vol. 1	2010-2011	Amazing Spider-Man #648-673, 654.1; FCBD 2011 (Spider-Man); Venom (2011) #6-9; Spider-Island: Avengers; Spider-Island: Deadly Foes; Spider-Island: Heroes For Hire; Spider-Island: I Love New York City; Spider-Island: Spider-Woman; Spider-Island: Amazing Spider-Girl #1-3; Spider-Island: Cloak & Dagger #1-3; Spider-Island: Deadly Hands of Kung Fu #1-3; Herc #7-8; Black Panther: The Most Dangerous Man Alive #524; Spider-Island: Emergence of Evil - Jackal & Hobgoblin (framing story)	#648–673	1,376	18 May 2027	TBC DM cover: TBC
1	The Superior Spider-Man	2012–2014	The Amazing Spider-Man #698–700, The Superior Spider-Man #1–31, Annual #1–2	#698-731	960	6 Jun 2023	Ryan Stegman cover: 978-1302951078
1	The Superior Spider-Man	2012–2014	The Amazing Spider-Man #698–700, The Superior Spider-Man #1–31, Annual #1–2	#698-731	960	6 Jun 2023	Joe Quesada DM cover: 978-1302951085
2	Superior Spider-Man Returns	2013–2024	Avenging Spider-Man (2011) #15.1, #16-22; Superior Spider-Man Team-Up (2013) #1-12; Superior Spider-Man (2013) #6AU, #32-33; Daredevil (2011) #22; Scarlet Spider (2012) #20; All-New X-Men Special (2013) #1; Indestructible Hulk Special (2013) #1; Superior Spider-Man Team-Up Special (2013) #1; Inhumanity: Superior Spider-Man (2014) #1; Superior Octopus (2018) #1 (A story); Superior Spider-Man (2018) #1-12; Superior Spider-Man Returns (2023); Superior Spider-Man (2023) #1-8; Amazing Spider-Man (2022) #31 (Superior Spider-Man story)	#740-741	1,264	13 Jan 2026	Mark Bagley cover: 978-1302963606
2	Superior Spider-Man Returns	2013–2024		#740-741	1,264	13 Jan 2026	Mike Del Mundo DM cover: 978-1302963613
1	Amazing Spider-Man by Nick Spencer Vol. 1	2018–2020	Amazing Spider-Man (vol.5) #1–43, 16.HU and 18.HU–20.HU; Amazing Spider-Man: Full Circle; material from FCBD 2018 (Amazing Spider-Man/Guardians of the Galaxy)	#802-844	1,328	10 Jan 2023	Ryan Ottley cover: 978-1302946098
1	Amazing Spider-Man by Nick Spencer Vol. 1	2018–2020	Amazing Spider-Man (vol.5) #1–43, 16.HU and 18.HU–20.HU; Amazing Spider-Man: Full Circle; material from FCBD 2018 (Amazing Spider-Man/Guardians of the Galaxy)	#802-844	1,328	10 Jan 2023	Ryan Ottley DM cover: 978-1302946104
2	Amazing Spider-Man by Nick Spencer Vol. 2	2020–2021	Amazing Spider-Man (vol. 5) #44–73, 74 (A- and B-stories) and #50.LR–54.LR; Amazing Spider-Man: Sins Rising Prelude; Amazing Spider-Man: The Sins of Norman Osborn; Giant-Size Amazing Spider-Man: King's Random; Giant-Size Amazing Spider-Man: The Chameleon Conspiracy; Sinister War #1–4	#845-875	1,336	4 Jun 2024	Ryan Ottley cover: 978-1302953645
2	Amazing Spider-Man by Nick Spencer Vol. 2	2020–2021	Amazing Spider-Man (vol. 5) #44–73, 74 (A- and B-stories) and #50.LR–54.LR; Amazing Spider-Man: Sins Rising Prelude; Amazing Spider-Man: The Sins of Norman Osborn; Giant-Size Amazing Spider-Man: King's Random; Giant-Size Amazing Spider-Man: The Chameleon Conspiracy; Sinister War #1–4	#845-875	1,336	4 Jun 2024	Patrick Gleason DM cover: 978-1302953652
2	Amazing Spider-Man by Nick Spencer Vol. 2	2020–2021	Amazing Spider-Man (vol. 5) #44–73, 74 (A- and B-stories) and #50.LR–54.LR; Amazing Spider-Man: Sins Rising Prelude; Amazing Spider-Man: The Sins of Norman Osborn; Giant-Size Amazing Spider-Man: King's Random; Giant-Size Amazing Spider-Man: The Chameleon Conspiracy; Sinister War #1–4	#845-875	1,336	4 Jun 2024	Arthur Adams DM cover: 978-1302954130
	Amazing Spider-Man: Beyond	2021–2022	Amazing Spider-Man (vol. 5) #75–93, 78.BEY, 80.BEY, 88.BEY, 92.BEY, 74 (Ben Reilly story); FCBD 2021: Spider-Man/Venom (Spider-Man story); Mary Jane & Black Cat: Beyond	#876-894	672	6 Jun 2023	Arthur Adams Ben Reilly DM cover: 978-1302949624
	Amazing Spider-Man: Beyond	2021–2022	Amazing Spider-Man (vol. 5) #75–93, 78.BEY, 80.BEY, 88.BEY, 92.BEY, 74 (Ben Reilly story); FCBD 2021: Spider-Man/Venom (Spider-Man story); Mary Jane & Black Cat: Beyond	#876-894	672	6 Jun 2023	Arthur Adams Kraven The Hunter DM cover: 978-1302949631
	Amazing Spider-Man: Beyond	2021–2022	Amazing Spider-Man (vol. 5) #75–93, 78.BEY, 80.BEY, 88.BEY, 92.BEY, 74 (Ben Reilly story); FCBD 2021: Spider-Man/Venom (Spider-Man story); Mary Jane & Black Cat: Beyond	#876-894	672	6 Jun 2023	Humberto Ramos MJ & Black Cat DM cover: 978-1302949648
1	Spider-Man by Zeb Wells Vol. 1	2022-2023	Amazing Spider-Man (vol. 6) #1-26; Dark Web: Dark Web Finale: FCBD 2022: Spider-Man/Venom (Spider-Man story): Amazing Spider-Man Annual (2023); Fallen Friend	#895-920	888	10 Feb 2026	John Romita Jr. cover: 978-1302966515
1	Spider-Man by Zeb Wells Vol. 1	2022-2023	Amazing Spider-Man (vol. 6) #1-26; Dark Web: Dark Web Finale: FCBD 2022: Spider-Man/Venom (Spider-Man story): Amazing Spider-Man Annual (2023); Fallen Friend	#895-920	888	10 Feb 2026	Benjamin Su DM cover: 978-1302966522
2	Spider-Man by Zeb Wells Vol. 2	2023-2024	Amazing Spider-Man (vol. 6) #27-66; Amazing Spider-Man: Gang War First Strike; material from FCBD 2023: Spider-Man/Venom; FCBD 2024: Spider-Man/Ultimate Universe; Web Of Spider-Man (2024) #1	#921-960	1,032	11 Aug 2026	John Romita Jr. cover: 978-1302966638
2	Spider-Man by Zeb Wells Vol. 2	2023-2024	Amazing Spider-Man (vol. 6) #27-66; Amazing Spider-Man: Gang War First Strike; material from FCBD 2023: Spider-Man/Venom; FCBD 2024: Spider-Man/Ultimate Universe; Web Of Spider-Man (2024) #1	#921-960	1,032	11 Aug 2026	Ed McGuinness DM cover: 978-1302966645
These creator-focused omnibuses jump around eras
	Spider-Man by John Byrne	1977-2000	Amazing Spider-Man #189–190, 206, Annual #13; Peter Parker, the Spectacular Spider-Man #58; Spider-Man: Chapter One #0–12; Marvel Team-Up #53–55, 59–70, 75; Amazing Spider-Man (vol. 2) #1 (A- and C-stories), 2–11, 12 (A-story) 13–18; Marvel Authentix: Amazing Spider-Man #1		1,264	3 Sep 2019	John Byrne cover: 978-1302919528
	Spider-Man by Joe Kelly	2008–2022	Amazing Spider-Man #575–576, 595–599, 606–607, 611, 617, 625; Non-Stop Spider-Man (2021) #1–5; Savage Spider-Man (2022) #1–5; Marvel Fanfare (1996) #2–3; Webspinners: Tales of Spider-Man (1999) #7–9; material from Amazing Spider-Man: Extra! (2008) #1, 3; Amazing Spider-Man #577, 600, 612, 634–637, 647; Spider-Man: Grim Hunt - The Kraven Saga (2010)		880	14 Jan 2025	Ken Lashley cover: 978-1302951931
	Spider-Man by Joe Kelly	2008–2022	Amazing Spider-Man #575–576, 595–599, 606–607, 611, 617, 625; Non-Stop Spider-Man (2021) #1–5; Savage Spider-Man (2022) #1–5; Marvel Fanfare (1996) #2–3; Webspinners: Tales of Spider-Man (1999) #7–9; material from Amazing Spider-Man: Extra! (2008) #1, 3; Amazing Spider-Man #577, 600, 612, 634–637, 647; Spider-Man: Grim Hunt - The Kraven Saga (2010)		880	14 Jan 2025	Phil Jimenez DM cover: 978-1302951948
These omnibuses are largely not acknowledged by the main Spider-Man continuity
	Spider-Man by Todd McFarlane	1990-1991	Spider-Man #1–14, 16; X-Force #4		440	16 Aug 2016	Todd McFarlane cover: 978-1302900731
	Spider-Man by Todd McFarlane	1990-1991	Spider-Man #1–14, 16; X-Force #4		440	7 Sep 2021	Todd McFarlane cover: 978-1302928391
	Spider-Man by Todd McFarlane	1990-1991	Spider-Man #1–14, 16; X-Force #4		440	7 Sep 2021	Todd McFarlane Black Costume cover: 978-1302928407
	Spider-Man's Tangled Web	2001–2003	Tangled Web #1-4; Spider-Man's Tangled Web #5-22		560	27 Jun 2017	978-1302906825
	The Superior Foes Of Spider-Man	2013–2014	The Superior Foes of Spider-Man #1-17		376	16 Feb 2016	978-0785198376
	Spider-Man by Chip Zdarsky	2017-2021	Peter Parker: The Spectacular Spider-Man (vol. 3) #1–6, #297–310, Annual (2018); FCBD 2017: Secret Empire (Spider-Man story); Spider-Man: Life Story #1–6, Annual (2021); Spider-Man: Spider's Shadow #1–5		928	12 Dec 2023	Adam Kubert cover: 978-1302952983
	Spider-Man by Chip Zdarsky	2017-2021	Peter Parker: The Spectacular Spider-Man (vol. 3) #1–6, #297–310, Annual (2018); FCBD 2017: Secret Empire (Spider-Man story); Spider-Man: Life Story #1–6, Annual (2021); Spider-Man: Spider's Shadow #1–5		928	12 Dec 2023	Paulo Siqueira DM cover: 978-1302952990
	Spider-Man by Chip Zdarsky	2017-2021	Peter Parker: The Spectacular Spider-Man (vol. 3) #1–6, #297–310, Annual (2018); FCBD 2017: Secret Empire (Spider-Man story); Spider-Man: Life Story #1–6, Annual (2021); Spider-Man: Spider's Shadow #1–5		928	12 Dec 2023	Chip Zdarsky DM cover: 978-1302955922
	Spider-Man by Chip Zdarsky	2017-2021	Peter Parker: The Spectacular Spider-Man (vol. 3) #1–6, #297–310, Annual (2018); FCBD 2017: Secret Empire (Spider-Man story); Spider-Man: Life Story #1–6, Annual (2021); Spider-Man: Spider's Shadow #1–5		928	15 Sep 2026	Adam Kubert cover: 978-1302969974
	Spider-Man by Chip Zdarsky	2017-2021	Peter Parker: The Spectacular Spider-Man (vol. 3) #1–6, #297–310, Annual (2018); FCBD 2017: Secret Empire (Spider-Man story); Spider-Man: Life Story #1–6, Annual (2021); Spider-Man: Spider's Shadow #1–5		928	15 Sep 2026	DM cover: TBC
	Symbiote Spider-Man by Peter David	2019–2024	Symbiote Spider-Man (2019) #1-5; Symbiote Spider-Man: Alien Reality #1-5; Symbiote Spider-Man: King In Black #1-5; Symbiote Spider-Man: Crossroads #1-5; Symbiote Spider-Man 2099 (2024) #1-5		632	12 Aug 2025	Greg Land cover: 978-1302961947
	Symbiote Spider-Man by Peter David	2019–2024	Symbiote Spider-Man (2019) #1-5; Symbiote Spider-Man: Alien Reality #1-5; Symbiote Spider-Man: King In Black #1-5; Symbiote Spider-Man: Crossroads #1-5; Symbiote Spider-Man 2099 (2024) #1-5		632	12 Aug 2025	Nick Bradshaw DM cover: 978-1302961954

=== Event Omnibuses ===
#	Title	Years covered	Material collected	Legacy	Pages	Released	ISBN
	Secret Wars II	1985-1988	Secret Wars II #1–9, The Amazing Spider-Man #268, 273–274; and more: New Mutants #30, 36–37; Captain America #308; Uncanny X-Men #196, 202–203; Iron Man #197; Fantastic Four #282, 285, 288, 316–319; Web of Spider-Man #6; Daredevil #223; The Incredible Hulk (vol. 2) #312; The Avengers #260–261, 265–266; Dazzler #40; Alpha Flight #28; The Thing #30; Doctor Strange #74; Cloak and Dagger #4; Power Pack #18; Thor #363; Power Man and Iron Fist #121; Peter Parker, the Spectacular Spider-Man #111; Defenders #152; Deadpool Team-Up #1; Quasar #8	#273-274	1,184	6 May 2009	Ed McGuinness & Mark Farmer cover: 978-0785131113
	Secret Wars II	1985-1988		#273-274	1,184	6 May 2009	John Byrne DM cover: 978-0785136583
	Acts Of Vengeance	1989-1990	Avengers #311–313, Annual #19; Avengers Spotlight #26–29; Avengers West Coast #53–55; Captain America #365–367; Iron Man #251–252; Quasar #5–7; Thor #411–413; Cloak And Dagger (vol. 3) #9; Amazing Spider-Man #326–329; Spectacular Spider-Man #158–160; Web Of Spider-Man #59–61	#326-329	744	2 Feb 2011	Alan Davis cover: 978-0785144649
	Acts Of Vengeance	1989-1990	Avengers #311–313, Annual #19; Avengers Spotlight #26–29; Avengers West Coast #53–55; Captain America #365–367; Iron Man #251–252; Quasar #5–7; Thor #411–413; Cloak And Dagger (vol. 3) #9; Amazing Spider-Man #326–329; Spectacular Spider-Man #158–160; Web Of Spider-Man #59–61	#326-329	744	2 Feb 2011	John Byrne DM cover: 978-0785144656
	Spider-Verse / Spider-Geddon Omnibus	2014–2018	Edge of Spider-Verse (2014) #1–5; Spider-Verse (2014) #1–2; Superior Spider-Man (2013) #32–33; Amazing Spider-Man (vol. 3) #7–15, and more: Spider-Man 2099 (2014) #5–8; Scarlet Spiders (2014) #1–3; Spider-Woman (2014) #1–4; Spider-Verse Team-Up (2014) #1–3; material from FCBD 2014: Guardians of the Galaxy; Edge of Spider-Geddon (2018) #1–4; Spider-Geddon (2018) #0–5; Superior Octopus (2018) #1; Spider-Force (2018) #1–3; Spider-Girls (2018) #1–3; Peter Parker, the Spectacular Spider-Man (2017) #311–313; Spider-Gwen: Ghost-Spider (2018) #1–4; Vault of Spiders (2018) #1–2; Spider-Geddon: Spider-Man Noir Video Comic (2018); Spider-Geddon: Spider-Gwen - Ghost-Spider Video Comic (2018); Spider-Geddon: Spider-Man Video Comic (2018); Spider-Geddon Handbook (2018)	#740-748	1,440	21 Feb 2023	Olivier Coipel cover: 978-1302947422
	Spider-Verse / Spider-Geddon Omnibus	2014–2018		#740-748	1,440	21 Feb 2023	Giuseppe Camuncoli DM cover: 978-1302947439
	Dark Web Omnibus	2022–2023	Dark Web #1, Amazing Spider-Man (vol. 6) #14–18; Venom (2021) #13–16; Dark Web: X-Men #1–3; Dark Web: Ms. Marvel #1–2; Dark Web Finale; Mary Jane & Black Cat #1–5; Gold Goblin #1–5; material from FCBD 2022: Spider-Man/Venom	#908-912	528	4 Feb 2025	John Romita Jr cover: 978-1302961152
	Dark Web Omnibus	2022–2023	Dark Web #1, Amazing Spider-Man (vol. 6) #14–18; Venom (2021) #13–16; Dark Web: X-Men #1–3; Dark Web: Ms. Marvel #1–2; Dark Web Finale; Mary Jane & Black Cat #1–5; Gold Goblin #1–5; material from FCBD 2022: Spider-Man/Venom	#908-912	528	4 Feb 2025	Ryan Stegman DM cover: 978-1302961169
	Spider-Man: Gang War	2023–2024	Amazing Spider-Man (vol. 6) #39-44; Amazing Spider-Man: Gang War First Strike; Daredevil: Gang War #1-4; Deadly Hands Of Kung-Fu: Gang War #1-3; Jackpot (2024); Luke Cage: Gang War #1-4; Miles Morales: Spider-Man (2022) #13-16; Spider-Woman (2023) #1-4	#933-938	680	19 Aug 2025	John Romita Jr. cover: 978-1302961824
	Spider-Man: Gang War	2023–2024	Amazing Spider-Man (vol. 6) #39-44; Amazing Spider-Man: Gang War First Strike; Daredevil: Gang War #1-4; Deadly Hands Of Kung-Fu: Gang War #1-3; Jackpot (2024); Luke Cage: Gang War #1-4; Miles Morales: Spider-Man (2022) #13-16; Spider-Woman (2023) #1-4	#933-938	680	19 Aug 2025	Ryan Stegman DM cover: 978-1302961992

=== Oversized hardcovers ===
#	Title	Years covered	Material collected	Pages	Released	ISBN
	Complete Frank Miller Spider-Man	1978-1980	Spectacular Spider-Man (vol. 1) #27-28, Amazing Spider-Man Annual #14-15, Marvel Team-Up Annual #4, Marvel Team-Up #100	216	10 Apr 2002	978-0785108993
1	Best of Spider-Man Vol. 1	2001	Amazing Spider-Man (vol. 2) #30–36, Spider-Man's Tangled Web #4–6, Peter Parker: Spider-Man #36, Ultimate Marvel Team-Up #6–8	336	18 Sep 2002	J. Scott Campbell cover: 978-0785109006
2	Best of Spider-Man Vol. 2	2002	Amazing Spider-Man (vol. 2) #37–45, Spider-Man's Tangled Web #10–11, Peter Parker: Spider-Man #44–47	368	Jun 2003	Jason Pearson cover: 978-0785111009
3	Best of Spider-Man Vol. 3	2002–2003	Amazing Spider-Man (vol. 2) #46–58, 500	368	Jun 2004	J. Scott Campbell cover: 978-0785113393
4	Best of Spider-Man Vol. 4	2003–2004	Amazing Spider-Man #501–514	336	Jul 2005	Mike Deodato cover: 978-0785118275
5	Best of Spider-Man Vol. 5	2005	Amazing Spider-Man #515–524	240	Jul 2006	Mike Deodato cover: 978-0785121282
	Spider-Man: The Other	2005–2006	Amazing Spider-Man #525–528; Friendly Neighborhood Spider-Man #1–4; Marvel Knights Spider-Man #19–22	288	25 Oct 2006	Joe Quesada cover: 978-0785121886
	Civil War: Spider-Man	2006–2007	Friendly Neighborhood Spider-Man #11–16, Amazing Spider-Man #529–538, Sensational Spider-Man #28–34	544	1 Dec 2010	Ron Garney cover: 978-0785148821
	Spider-Man: Back In Black	2007	Amazing Spider-Man #539–543; Friendly Neighborhood Spider-Man #17–23, Annual #1	336	10 Oct 2007	Angel Medina cover: 978-0785129042
	Spider-Island	2011	Amazing Spider-Man #666–673; Venom (2011) #6–8; Spider-Island: Deadly Foes; material from Spider-Island Spotlight; Amazing Spider-Man #659–660, 662–665	392	11 Jan 2012	Humberto Ramos cover: 978-0785151043
	Spider-Island Companion	2011	Spider-Island: I Love New York City, and more: Spider-Island: The Amazing Spider-Girl #1–3; Spider-Island: Cloak & Dagger #1–3; Spider-Island: Deadly Hands Of Kung Fu #1–3; Herc #7–8; Spider-Island: Avengers; Spider-Island: Spider-Woman; Black Panther: The Most Dangerous Man Alive #524; Spider-Island: Heroes For Hire	424	15 Feb 2012	Humberto Ramos cover: 978-0785162285
	Spider-Man: Ends of the Earth	2012	Amazing Spider-Man #682–687; Amazing Spider-Man: Ends of the Earth; Avenging Spider-Man #8	192	18 Jul 2012	Stefano Caselli cover: 978-0785160052
1	Superior Spider-Man: Vol. 1	2012–2013	The Amazing Spider-Man #698–700, The Superior Spider-Man #1–5	248	11 Sep 2013	Humberto Ramos cover: 978-0785185215
1	Superior Spider-Man: Vol. 1	2012–2013	The Amazing Spider-Man #698–700, The Superior Spider-Man #1–5	248	11 Sep 2013	Steve Ditko DM cover: 978-0785185222
2	Superior Spider-Man: Vol. 2	2013	The Superior Spider-Man #6–16	248	24 Apr 2014	Giuseppe Camuncoli cover: 978-0785154488
3	Superior Spider-Man: Vol. 3	2013–2014	The Superior Spider-Man #17–31, Annual #1-2	432	18 Mar 2015	Giuseppe Camuncoli cover: 978-0785193951
1	Amazing Spider-Man Vol. 1	2014	Amazing Spider-Man (vol. 3) #1–6, #1.1–1.5, Annual (2014)	272	1 Jan 2016	Alex Ross cover: 978-0785195351
2	Amazing Spider-Man Vol. 2	2014–2015	Amazing Spider-Man (vol. 3) #7–18; Superior Spider-Man #32–33; material from FCBD 2014: Guardians of the Galaxy	352	19 Apr 2016	Giuseppe Camuncoli cover: 978-0785195375
	Spider-Verse	2014–2015	Amazing Spider-Man (vol. 3) #7–15; Superior Spider-Man #32–33, and more: Material from FCBD 2014: Guardians of the Galaxy, Spider-Verse #1–2; Spider-Verse Team-Up #1–3; Scarlet Spiders #1–3; Spider-Woman (2014) #1–4; Spider-Man 2099 #6–8	648	29 Apr 2015	Olivier Coipel cover: 978-0785190356
1	Amazing Spider-Man Worldwide HC. 1	2015–2016	Amazing Spider-Man (vol. 4) #1–11	280	4 Jan 2017	Alex Ross cover: 978-1302904067
2	Amazing Spider-Man Worldwide HC. 2	2016	Amazing Spider-Man (vol. 4) #12–19; material from FCBD 2015: Amazing Spider-Man and FCBD 2016 (Captain America)	232	6 Sep 2017	Alex Ross cover: 978-1302908423
	Amazing Spider-Man: The Clone Conspiracy	2016–2017	Amazing Spider-Man (vol. 4) #19–24; The Clone Conspiracy #1–5; The Clone Conspiracy: Omega – Silk #14–17; Prowler #1–5; material from FCBD 2016 (Captain America)	512	12 Apr 2017	Gabriele Dell'Otto cover: 978-1302903268
3	Amazing Spider-Man Worldwide HC. 3	2016–2017	Amazing Spider-Man (vol. 4) #20–28, Annual #1	304	1 Jan 2018	Alex Ross cover: 978-1302908911
	Red Goblin	2018	Amazing Spider-Man #794–801, Annual #42	264	19 Sep 2018	Alex Ross cover: 978-1302913540
	Marvel Knights Spider-Man	2004	Marvel Knights Spider-Man #1–12	304	2 Nov 2005	Frank Cho cover: 978-0785118428
	Peter Parker, Spider-Man – Back In Black	2007	Sensational Spider-Man (vol. 2) #35–40, Annual #1; Spider-Man Family #1–2; Marvel Spotlight: Spider-Man; Spider-Man: Back in Black Handbook	336	28 Nov 2007	Angel Medina cover: 978-0785129202
Miniseries
	Amazing Spider-Man 500 Covers	1962-2003	500 covers from Amazing Spider-Man	560	2 Jun 2004	Alex Ross cover: 978-0785114215
1	Spider-Man: The Newspaper Strips Vol. 1	1977-1979	Stan Lee & John Romita Sr. daily and Sunday strips	352	28 Oct 2009	John Romita Sr. cover: 978-0785137931
2	Spider-Man: The Newspaper Strips Vol. 2	1979-1981	Stan Lee & John Romita Sr. daily and Sunday strips	320	3 Aug 2011	John Romita Sr. cover: 978-0785149422
	Spider-Man: The Graphic Novels	1986-1992	Marvel Graphic Novel #22: Amazing Spider-Man: Hooky; #46: Parallel Lives; #63: Spirits of the Earth; '#72: Fear Itself	280	13 Jun 2012	Charles Vess cover: 978-0785160656
	Spider-Man: Kraven's Last Hunt Deluxe Edition	1987	Amazing Spider-Man #15, 293–294, and more: Web of Spider-Man #31–32; Spectacular Spider-Man #131–132; Marvel Team-Up #128; Amazing Spider-Man: Soul of the Hunter OGN; What If? (1989) #17; material from Sensational Spider-Man Annual '96; Amazing Spider-Man (vol. 2) #634–637; What The--?! #3	400	8 Aug 2018	Mike Zeck cover: 978-1302911843
	Spider-Man: Blue	2002	Spider-Man: Blue #1–6	160	19 May 2003	Tim Sale cover: 978-0785110620
	Marvel Adventures Spider-Man Vol. 1	2005	Marvel Adventures Spider-Man #1–8	192	Oct 2006	978-0785124320
	Spider-Man / Human Torch	2005	Spider-Man / Human Torch #1–5	128	19 Aug 2009	Paul Smith cover: 978-0785140047
	Spider-Man: The Real Clone Saga	2009	Spider-Man: The Clone Saga (2009) #1–6	144	26 May 2010	Pasqual Ferry cover: 978-0785144243
	Spider-Man/Fantastic Four	2010	Spider-Man/Fantastic Four #1–4; Spectacular Spider-Man #42; Fantastic Four #218	136	9 Feb 2011	Mario Alberti cover: 978-0785146049
	Spider-Man And Wolverine by Wells and Madureira	2011	Avenging Spider-Man #1–3; Savage Wolverine #6–8	160	27 Nov 2013	Joe Madureira cover: 978-0785185079
	Spider-Men	2012	Spider-Men #1–5	128	14 Nov 2012	Jim Cheung cover: 978-0785165330
	Amazing Spider-Man: Family Business	2013	Original Graphic Novel by Mark Waid, James Robinson and Gabrielle Dell'Otto	112	2 Apr 2014	Gabrielle Dell'Otto cover: 978-0785184409
	Amazing Spider-Man: Who Am I?	2014	Amazing Spider-Man: Who Am I? Infinite Comic #1–12	152	18 Feb 2015	Juan Bobillo cover: 978-0785184584
	Amazing Spider-Man: Full Circle	2019	Amazing Spider-Man: Full Circle one-shot	128	15 Jul 2020	Rod Reis cover: 978-1302921385
	Spider-Man/Deadpool by Kelly and McGuinness	2016–2017	Spider-Man/Deadpool #1–5, 8–10, 13–14, 17–18	264	7 Mar 2018	Ed McGuinness cover: 978-1302903725
	Spider-Man: Life Story	2019	Spider-Man: Life Story #1–6, Annual (2021)	240	5 Nov 2019	Chip Zdarsky cover: 978-1302931919

=== Marvel Masterworks ===
Launched in 1987, Marvel Masterworks was Marvel Comics' first attempt at republishing a series in full color, beginning with a character's first appearance.

#	Title	Years covered	Material collected	Pages	Released	ISBN
1	Marvel Masterworks: Amazing Spider-Man Vol. 1	1962-64	Amazing Fantasy #15; Amazing Spider-Man #1–10	248	Nov 1987	978-0871353054
1	Marvel Masterworks: Amazing Spider-Man Vol. 1	1962-64	Amazing Fantasy #15; Amazing Spider-Man #1–10	248	1998	978-0785107033
1	Marvel Masterworks: Amazing Spider-Man Vol. 1	1962-64	Amazing Fantasy #15; Amazing Spider-Man #1–10	248	2002	978-0785108641
1	Marvel Masterworks: Amazing Spider-Man Vol. 1	1962-64	Amazing Fantasy #15; Amazing Spider-Man #1–10	248	Jul 2003	978-0785112563
2	Marvel Masterworks: Amazing Spider-Man Vol. 2	1964	Amazing Spider-Man #11–19, Annual #1	288	Oct 1988	978-0871354808
2	Marvel Masterworks: Amazing Spider-Man Vol. 2	1964	Amazing Spider-Man #11–19, Annual #1	288	2002	978-0785109242
2	Marvel Masterworks: Amazing Spider-Man Vol. 2	1964	Amazing Spider-Man #11–19, Annual #1	288	Aug 2003	978-0785112648
3	Marvel Masterworks: Amazing Spider-Man Vol. 3	1965	Amazing Spider-Man #20–30, Annual #2	272	Oct 1989	978-0871355966
3	Marvel Masterworks: Amazing Spider-Man Vol. 3	1965	Amazing Spider-Man #20–30, Annual #2	272	Oct 2003	978-0785111887
4	Marvel Masterworks: Amazing Spider-Man Vol. 4	1965-66	Amazing Spider-Man #31–40	216	Aug 1991	978-0871357304
4	Marvel Masterworks: Amazing Spider-Man Vol. 4	1965-66	Amazing Spider-Man #31–40	216	Dec 2003	978-0785111894
5	Marvel Masterworks: Amazing Spider-Man Vol. 5	1966-67	Amazing Spider-Man #41–50, Annual #3	240	Dec 1992	978-0871359148
5	Marvel Masterworks: Amazing Spider-Man Vol. 5	1966-67	Amazing Spider-Man #41–50, Annual #3	240	Feb 2004	978-0785111900
6	Marvel Masterworks: Amazing Spider-Man Vol. 6	1967-68	Amazing Spider-Man #51–61, Annual #4	304	Apr 2004	978-0785113621
6	Marvel Masterworks: Amazing Spider-Man Vol. 6	1967-68	Amazing Spider-Man #51–61, Annual #4	304	Mar 2009	978-0785131151
7	Marvel Masterworks: Amazing Spider-Man Vol. 7	1968	Amazing Spider-Man #62–67, Annual #5; Spectacular Spider-Man magazine #1–2 (black and white)	320	Apr 2005	978-0785116363
7	Marvel Masterworks: Amazing Spider-Man Vol. 7	1968	Amazing Spider-Man #62–67, Annual #5; Spectacular Spider-Man magazine #1–2 (black and white)	320	Apr 2009	978-0785131984
8	Marvel Masterworks: Amazing Spider-Man Vol. 8	1968-69	Amazing Spider-Man #68–77; Marvel Super-Heroes #14	240	Oct 2006	978-0785120742
9	Marvel Masterworks: Amazing Spider-Man Vol. 9	1969-70	Amazing Spider-Man #78–87	240	Nov 2007	978-0785124627
10	Marvel Masterworks: Amazing Spider-Man Vol. 10	1970-71	Amazing Spider-Man #88–99	240	Aug 2008	978-0785129325
11	Marvel Masterworks: Amazing Spider-Man Vol. 11	1971-72	Amazing Spider-Man #100–109	256	Aug 2009	978-0785135074
12	Marvel Masterworks: Amazing Spider-Man Vol. 12	1972-73	Amazing Spider-Man #110–120	240	Sep 2009	978-0785142140
13	Marvel Masterworks: Amazing Spider-Man Vol. 13	1973-74	Amazing Spider-Man #121–131	240	Mar 2011	978-0785150367
14	Marvel Masterworks: Amazing Spider-Man Vol. 14	1974-75	Amazing Spider-Man #132–142; Giant-Size Super-Heroes #1	256	Jul 2012	978-0785159759
15	Marvel Masterworks: Amazing Spider-Man Vol. 15	1975-76	Amazing Spider-Man #143–155	264	Mar 2013	978-0785166313
16	Marvel Masterworks: Amazing Spider-Man Vol. 16	1976-77	Amazing Spider-Man #156–168, Annual #10	288	Apr 2014	978-0785188018
17	Marvel Masterworks: Amazing Spider-Man Vol. 17	1977-78	Amazing Spider-Man #169–180, Annual #11, Nova #12, Marvel Treasury #14	288	Dec 2016	978-0785191865
18	Marvel Masterworks: Amazing Spider-Man Vol. 18	1978-79	Amazing Spider-Man #181–193, Mighty Marvel Comics Calendar 1978, material from Annual #12	272	Dec 2016	978-1302900281
19	Marvel Masterworks: Amazing Spider-Man Vol. 19	1979-80	Amazing Spider-Man #193–202, Annual #13, Peter Parker, the Spectacular Spider-Man Annual #1	296	Jun 2017	978-1302903398
20	Marvel Masterworks: Amazing Spider-Man Vol. 20	1980-81	Amazing Spider-Man #203–212 and Annual #14	264	Dec 2018	978-1302910259
21	Marvel Masterworks: Amazing Spider-Man Vol. 21	1981	Amazing Spider-Man #213–223 and Annual #15	312	Nov 2019	978-1302917005
22	Marvel Masterworks: Amazing Spider-Man Vol. 22	1982-83	Amazing Spider-Man #224–237, Annual #16, The Marvel Comics Guide to Collecting Comics 1982 and material from The Official Handbook of the Marvel Universe	448	Sep 2020	978-1302922221
23	Marvel Masterworks: Amazing Spider-Man Vol. 23	1983-84	Amazing Spider-Man #238–251, Annual #17 and Peter Parker, the Spectacular Spider-Man #85	472	Nov 2021	978-1302929336
24	Marvel Masterworks: Amazing Spider-Man Vol. 24	1984-85	Amazing Spider-Man #252–262 and Annual #18	336	Dec 2022	978-1302933265
25	Marvel Masterworks: Amazing Spider-Man Vol. 25	1985	Amazing Spider-Man #263–270, Annual #19, Web of Spider-Man #01 and 06 and material from The Official Marvel Index to the Amazing Spider-Man #01–09	320	Dec 2023	978-1302949495
26	Marvel Masterworks: Amazing Spider-Man Vol. 26	1985-86	Amazing Spider-Man #271–278, Peter Parker, the Spectacular Spider-Man #111, Marvel Graphic Novel No. 22 - Hooky and material from Marvel Fanfare #27	336	May 2024	978-1302955243
27	Marvel Masterworks: Amazing Spider-Man Vol. 27	1986-1987	Amazing Spider-Man #279-288, Annual #20; material from Marvel Tales #198	304	Dec 2025	978-1302962692

=== Mighty Marvel Masterworks ===
In 2021, Marvel launched a new version of Masterworks books as "more affordable versions of this once high-priced line". These paperbacks are sized at 6-by-9in. digest editions.

#	Title	Years covered	Material collected	Pages	Released	ISBN
1	Mighty Masterworks: Amazing Spider-Man Vol. 1 - With Great Power...	1962-1964	Amazing Fantasy #15; Amazing Spider-Man #1–10	256	8 Jun 2021	978-1302929770
2	Mighty Masterworks: Amazing Spider-Man Vol. 2 - The Sinister Six	1964	Amazing Spider-Man #11–19, Annual #1	288	30 Nov 2021	978-1302931957
3	Mighty Masterworks: Amazing Spider-Man Vol. 3 - The Goblin and the Gangsters	1965	Amazing Spider-Man #20–28, Annual #2	224	5 Jul 2022	978-1302946173
4	Mighty Masterworks: Amazing Spider-Man Vol. 4 - The Master Planner	1965-1966	Amazing Spider-Man #29–38	216	11 Jul 2023	978-1302948993
5	Mighty Masterworks: Amazing Spider-Man Vol. 5 - To Become An Avenger	1966-1967	Amazing Spider-Man #39–46, Annual #3	200	5 Nov 2024	978-1302954345
6	Mighty Masterworks: Amazing Spider-Man Vol. 6 - From The Depths Of Defeat	1967	Amazing Spider-Man #47-52, Annual #4, material from Not Brand Echh #2	200	12 Aug 2025	978-1302962425

=== Marvel Premiere Classics ===
Beginning in 2006, the Premiere Classic hardcover line "compiled selected storylines from ... five decades of Marvel history". It was cancelled in 2012 after 107 volumes.

#	Title	Material collected	Pages	Released	ISBN
1	Spider-Man: Kraven's Last Hunt	Web of Spider-Man #31–32, Amazing Spider-Man #293–294, Spectacular Spider-Man (vol. 2) #131–132	168	21 Mar 2007	978-0785123309
1	Spider-Man: Kraven's Last Hunt	Web of Spider-Man #31–32, Amazing Spider-Man #293–294, Spectacular Spider-Man (vol. 2) #131–132	168	21 Mar 2007	DM: 978-0785124009
4	Spider-Man: Death of the Stacys	Amazing Spider-Man #88–92, 121–122	160	24 Jan 2007	978-0785125044
4	Spider-Man: Death of the Stacys	Amazing Spider-Man #88–92, 121–122	160	24 Jan 2007	DM: 978-0785125051
27	Spider-Man: Torment	Spider-Man #1–5, material from Marvel Age #90	144	29 Jul 2009	978-0785137917
27	Spider-Man: Torment	Spider-Man #1–5, material from Marvel Age #90	144	29 Jul 2009	DM: 978-0785137924
31	Spider-Man: Sinister Six	Amazing Spider-Man Annual #1; Amazing Spider-Man #334–339	192	16 Sep 2009	978-0785137979
31	Spider-Man: Sinister Six	Amazing Spider-Man Annual #1; Amazing Spider-Man #334–339	192	16 Sep 2009	DM: 978-0785137986
70	Spider-Man: The Death of Jean DeWolff	Peter Parker, the Spectacular Spider-Man #107–110, Spectacular Spider-Man (vol. 2) #134–136	168	11 Aug 2011	978-0785157212
70	Spider-Man: The Death of Jean DeWolff	Peter Parker, the Spectacular Spider-Man #107–110, Spectacular Spider-Man (vol. 2) #134–136	168	11 Aug 2011	DM: 978-0785157229
83	Spider-Man: Masques	Spider-Man #6–7, 13–14, 16; X-Force #4	144	18 Jan 2012	978-0785159438
83	Spider-Man: Masques	Spider-Man #6–7, 13–14, 16; X-Force #4	144	18 Jan 2012	DM: 978-0785159445
95	Spider-Man: Perceptions	Spider-Man #8–12	120	27 Jun 2012	978-0785160526
95	Spider-Man: Perceptions	Spider-Man #8–12	120	27 Jun 2012	DM: 978-0785160533
97	Spider-Man: Return of the Burglar	Amazing Spider-Man #193–200	168	25 Jul 2012	HC: 978-0785162650
97	Spider-Man: Return of the Burglar	Amazing Spider-Man #193–200	168	25 Jul 2012	DM 978-0785162667
103	Spider-Man: Revenge of the Sinister Six	Spider-Man #15, 18–23	176	5 Sep 2012	978-0785160564
103	Spider-Man: Revenge of the Sinister Six	Spider-Man #15, 18–23	176	5 Sep 2012	DM: 978-0785160571
105	Spider-Man: Nothing Can Stop the Juggernaut	Amazing Spider-Man #224–230	168	17 Oct 2012	978-0785162636
105	Spider-Man: Nothing Can Stop the Juggernaut	Amazing Spider-Man #224–230	168	17 Oct 2012	DM: 978-0785162643

=== Marvel Gallery Edition hardcovers ===
Marvel's Gallery Editions are large-format hardcovers that "emphasise the size of the pages printed rather than the amount of comics within. (This means) 13in/33cm in height, and 9.3in/24cm in width".

Title	Issues collected	Pages	Released	ISBN
Spider-Man: The Wedding Album	Amazing Spider-Man (vol.1) #290–292, Annual #21; Spectacular Spider-Man Annual #7; What If? (1989) #20–21, Marvel Saga: The Official History of the Marvel Universe #22; material from Not Brand Echh #6	296	13 Dec 2022	978-1302946531
One More Day	Amazing Spider-Man #544–545; Sensational Spider-Man #41; Friendly Neighborhood Spider-Man #24	136	18 Apr 2023	978-1302949914
Marvel Archive Edition: The Black Costume – Year One	Amazing Spider-Man #252–263 Facsimile Editions	464	11 Jun 2025	Ron Frenz Original First cover: 978-1302965327
Marvel Archive Edition: The Black Costume – Year One	Amazing Spider-Man #252–263 Facsimile Editions	464	11 Jun 2025	Charles Vess Hidden Gem DM cover: 978-1302965303
Marvel Archive Edition: The Black Costume – Year One	Amazing Spider-Man #252–263 Facsimile Editions	464	11 Jun 2025	Ron Frenz Original Collection DM cover: 978-1302965310

=== Epic Collections ===
Marvel launched the Epic Collections line of collected comics in 2013. Marvel Senior Vice President of Sales David Gabriel said they were intended to be: "big, fat, color collections at the best price we can maintain."

Though the books are often published out of order, Gabriel added: "When all is said and done, the Epic volumes will fit seamlessly next to one another on readers' bookshelves, presenting a complete and unbroken run of each title!"

The first Spider-Man Epic released was Volume 20: Cosmic Adventures.

Spine lettering: Red
#	Subtitle	Years covered	Issues collected	Writers	Artists	Pages	Released	ISBN
1	Great Power	1962-1964	Amazing Fantasy #15; Amazing Spider-Man #1–17, Annual #1	Stan Lee	Steve Ditko	504	24 Sep 2014	Amazing Spider-Man Annual #1 cover: 978-0785188346
1	Great Power	1962-1964	Amazing Fantasy #15; Amazing Spider-Man #1–17, Annual #1	Stan Lee	Steve Ditko	504	8 Apr 2020	Amazing Spider-Man Annual #1 cover: 978-1302925642
1	Great Power	1962-1964	Amazing Fantasy #15; Amazing Spider-Man #1–17, Annual #1	Stan Lee	Steve Ditko	504	31 May 2022	Amazing Spider-Man Annual #1 cover: 978-1302946852
2	Great Responsibility	1964-1966	Amazing Spider-Man #18–38, Annual #2	Stan Lee, Steve Ditko	Steve Ditko	504	21 Dec 2016	Amazing Spider-Man #19 cover: 978-0785195818
2	Great Responsibility	1964-1966	Amazing Spider-Man #18–38, Annual #2	Stan Lee, Steve Ditko	Steve Ditko	504	7 Nov 2023	Amazing Spider-Man #19 cover: 978-1302950576
3	Spider-Man No More	1966-1967	Amazing Spider-Man #39–52, Annual #3–4; material from Not Brand Echh #2	Stan Lee	John Romita Sr.	400	16 May 2018	Amazing Spider-Man Annual #3 cover: 978-1302910235
3	Spider-Man No More	1966-1967	Amazing Spider-Man #39–52, Annual #3–4; material from Not Brand Echh #2	Stan Lee	John Romita Sr.	400	4 Jan 2022	Amazing Spider-Man Annual #3 cover: 978-1302932497
4	The Goblin Lives	1967-1968	Amazing Spider-Man #53–67, Spectacular Spider-Man magazine #1–2, Marvel Super-Heroes #14; material from Not Brand Echh #6 & #11	Stan Lee	John Romita Sr.	496	19 Jun 2019	Amazing Spider-Man #65 cover: 978-1302917807
4	The Goblin Lives	1967-1968	Amazing Spider-Man #53–67, Spectacular Spider-Man magazine #1–2, Marvel Super-Heroes #14; material from Not Brand Echh #6 & #11	Stan Lee	John Romita Sr.	496	7 Mar 2023	Amazing Spider-Man #65 cover: 978-1302950392
5	The Secret Of The Petrified Tablet	1968-1970	Amazing Spider-Man #68–85, Annual #5	Stan Lee	John Romita Sr., John Buscema	464	11 Feb 2020	Amazing Spider-Man #68 cover: 978-1302921965
5	The Secret Of The Petrified Tablet	1968-1970	Amazing Spider-Man #68–85, Annual #5	Stan Lee	John Romita Sr., John Buscema	464	5 Mar 2024	Amazing Spider-Man #68 cover: 978-1302957810
6	The Death Of Captain Stacy	1970-1972	Amazing Spider-Man #86–104	Stan Lee, Roy Thomas	John Romita Sr., Gil Kane	440	19 Oct 2021	Amazing Spider-Man #95 cover: 978-1302929084
7	The Goblin's Last Stand	1972-1973	Amazing Spider-Man #105–123	Stan Lee, Gerry Conway	John Romita Sr., Gil Kane	432	3 May 2017	Amazing Spider-Man #122 cover: 978-1302904074
7	The Goblin's Last Stand	1972-1973	Amazing Spider-Man #105–123	Stan Lee, Gerry Conway	John Romita Sr., Gil Kane	432	20 Jan 2021	Amazing Spider-Man #122 cover: 978-1302928179
7	The Goblin's Last Stand	1972-1973	Amazing Spider-Man #105–123	Stan Lee, Gerry Conway	John Romita Sr., Gil Kane	432	16 Jun 2026	Amazing Spider-Man #122 cover: 978-1302967796
8	Man-Wolf At Midnight	1973-1975	Amazing Spider-Man #124–142, Giant-Size Super-Heroes #1	Gerry Conway	Ross Andru	416	19 Jul 2022	Amazing Spider-Man #130 cover: 978-1302933500
9	Spider-Man Or Spider-Clone?	1975-1977	Amazing Spider-Man #143–164, Annual #10	Gerry Conway, Len Wein	Ross Andru	464	25 Jul 2023	Amazing Spider-Man #144 cover: 978-1302948740
10	Big Apple Battleground	1977-1978	Amazing Spider-Man #165–185, Annual #11-12, Nova #12	Len Wein, Marv Wolfman	Ross Andru	520	28 May 2024	Amazing Spider-Man #181 cover: 978-1302955267
11	Nine Lives Has The Black Cat	1978-1980	Amazing Spider-Man #186-206, Annual #13, Peter Parker, Spectacular Spider-Man Annual #1	Marv Wolfman	Keith Pollard, John Byrne	488	25 Feb 2025	Amazing Spider-Man #200 cover: 978-1302960483
12	Spider-Man: Threat Or Menace?	1980-1981	Amazing Spider-Man #207-223, Annual #14-15	Dennis O'Neil	John Romita Jr., Frank Miller	480	6 Jan 2026	Amazing Spider-Man #217 cover: 978-1302960490
13	Nothing Can Stop The Juggernaut	1982-1983	Amazing Spider-Man #224-241, Annual #16	Roger Stern	John Romita Jr.	496	2 Jun 2026	Amazing Spider-Man #239 cover: 978-1302967789
15	Ghosts Of The Past	1984-1986	Amazing Spider-Man #259–272, Annual #18–19; Web of Spider-Man #1, 6	Tom DeFalco, Bob Layton, Louise Simonson, Peter David	Ron Frenz, Sal Buscema	472	21 May 2014	Amazing Spider-Man #270 cover: 978-0785189169
15	Ghosts Of The Past	1984-1986	Amazing Spider-Man #259–272, Annual #18–19; Web of Spider-Man #1, 6	Tom DeFalco, Bob Layton, Louise Simonson, Peter David	Ron Frenz, Sal Buscema	472	27 Jun 2023	Amazing Spider-Man #270 cover: 978-1302950484
17	Kraven's Last Hunt	1986-1987	Amazing Spider-Man #289–294, Annual #20–21, Spider-Man versus Wolverine, Spectacular Spider-Man #131–132 and Web of Spider-Man #29–32	James Owsley, David Michelinie, J.M. DeMatteis	John Romita Jr, Mark Bright, Mike Zeck	496	14 Jun 2017	Amazing Spider-Man #293 cover: 978-1302907051
17	Kraven's Last Hunt	1986-1987	Amazing Spider-Man #289–294, Annual #20–21, Spider-Man versus Wolverine, Spectacular Spider-Man #131–132 and Web of Spider-Man #29–32	James Owsley, David Michelinie, J.M. DeMatteis	John Romita Jr, Mark Bright, Mike Zeck	496	3 Jan 2023	Amazing Spider-Man #293 cover: 978-1302950330
18	Venom	1987-1988	Amazing Spider-Man #295–310, Annual #22; Spectacular Spider-Man #133; Web of Spider-Man #33	Ann Nocenti, David Michelinie	Cynthia Martin, Alex Saviuk, Todd McFarlane, Mark Bagley	504	29 Aug 2018	Amazing Spider-Man #300 cover: 978-1302911423
18	Venom	1987-1988	Amazing Spider-Man #295–310, Annual #22; Spectacular Spider-Man #133; Web of Spider-Man #33	Ann Nocenti, David Michelinie	Cynthia Martin, Alex Saviuk, Todd McFarlane, Mark Bagley	504	8 Apr 2025	Amazing Spider-Man #300 cover: 978-1302963903
19	Assassin Nation	1989	Amazing Spider-Man #311–325, Annual #23; Marvel Graphic Novel No. 46 - The Amazing Spider-Man: Parallel Lives	David Michelinie, Gerry Conway	Todd McFarlane, Rob Liefeld, Erik Larsen, Alex Saviuk	480	15 May 2019	Amazing Spider-Man #323 cover: 978-1302918118
19	Assassin Nation	1989	Amazing Spider-Man #311–325, Annual #23; Marvel Graphic Novel No. 46 - The Amazing Spider-Man: Parallel Lives	David Michelinie, Gerry Conway	Todd McFarlane, Rob Liefeld, Erik Larsen, Alex Saviuk	480	14 May 2024	Amazing Spider-Man #323 cover: 978-1302957902
20	Cosmic Adventures	1989-1990	Amazing Spider-Man #326–333, Annual #24; Spectacular Spider-Man #158–160, Annual #10; Web of Spider-Man #59–61, Annual #6	David Michelinie, Gerry Conway	Erik Larsen, Sal Buscema, Alex Saviuk, Gil Kane	504	20 Nov 2013	Spectacular Spider-Man #158 cover: 978-0785187899
20	Cosmic Adventures	1989-1990	Amazing Spider-Man #326–333, Annual #24; Spectacular Spider-Man #158–160, Annual #10; Web of Spider-Man #59–61, Annual #6	David Michelinie, Gerry Conway	Erik Larsen, Sal Buscema, Alex Saviuk, Gil Kane	504	4 Dec 2019	Spectacular Spider-Man #158 cover: 978-1302924294
21	Return Of The Sinister Six	1990-1991	Amazing Spider-Man #334–350; Marvel Graphic Novel No. 63 - Spider-Man: Spirits of the Earth	David Michelinie	Charles Vess, Erik Larsen, Mark Bagley	504	24 Feb 2016	Amazing Spider-Man #338 cover: 978-0785196914
21	Return Of The Sinister Six	1990-1991	Amazing Spider-Man #334–350; Marvel Graphic Novel No. 63 - Spider-Man: Spirits of the Earth	David Michelinie	Charles Vess, Erik Larsen, Mark Bagley	504	9 Jul 2024	Amazing Spider-Man #338 cover: 978-1302957889
22	Round Robin	1991-1992	Amazing Spider-Man #351–360, Annual #25; Spectacular Spider-Man Annual #11; Web of Spider-Man Annual #7; Marvel Graphic Novel No. 72 - Spider-Man: Fear Itself	David Michelinie, Al Milgrom	Mark Bagley, Chris Marrinan, Guang Yap, Ross Andru	488	31 Mar 2015	Amazing Spider-Man Annual #25 cover: 978-0785192688
22	Round Robin	1991-1992	Amazing Spider-Man #351–360, Annual #25; Spectacular Spider-Man Annual #11; Web of Spider-Man Annual #7; Marvel Graphic Novel No. 72 - Spider-Man: Fear Itself	David Michelinie, Al Milgrom	Mark Bagley, Chris Marrinan, Guang Yap, Ross Andru	488	19 Sep 2023	Amazing Spider-Man Annual #25 cover: 978-1302950545
23	The Hero Killers	1992	Amazing Spider-Man #361-367, Annual #26; Amazing Spider-Man: Soul of the Hunter; material from Spectacular Spider-Man Annual #12; Web of Spider-Man Annual #8; New Warriors Annual #2	David Michelinie, J.M. DeMatteis	Mark Bagley, Scott McDaniel, Mike Zeck	480	17 Jan 2023	New Warriors Annual #2 cover: 978-1302951047
24	Invasion Of The Spider-Slayers	1992-1993	Amazing Spider-Man #368–377, Annual #27; Spider-Man/Dr. Strange: The Way to Dusty Death; Spider-Man Special Edition: The Trial of Venom	Roy Thomas, David Michelinie	Mike Bair, Mark Bagley, Jeff Johnson	424	3 Jan 2023	Amazing Spider-Man #373 cover: 978-1302948320
25	Maximum Carnage	1993	Amazing Spider-Man #378–380, Spectacular Spider-Man #201–203, Web of Spider-Man #101–103, Spider-Man #35–37, Spider-Man/ Punisher/ Sabretooth: Designer Genes; material from Spider-Man Unlimited #1–2	Terry Kavanagh, David Michelinie, J.M. DeMatteis, Tom DeFalco	Alex Saviuk, Mark Bagley, Tom Lyle, Sal Buscema, Ron Lim	432	28 Jan 2020	Spider-Man Unlimited #1 cover: 978-1302921903
25	Maximum Carnage	1993	Amazing Spider-Man #378–380, Spectacular Spider-Man #201–203, Web of Spider-Man #101–103, Spider-Man #35–37, Spider-Man/ Punisher/ Sabretooth: Designer Genes; material from Spider-Man Unlimited #1–2	Terry Kavanagh, David Michelinie, J.M. DeMatteis, Tom DeFalco	Alex Saviuk, Mark Bagley, Tom Lyle, Sal Buscema, Ron Lim	432	23 May 2023	Spider-Man Unlimited #1 cover: 978-1302950460
26	Lifetheft	1993-1994	Amazing Spider-Man #381–393, Annual #28; Spectacular Spider-Man #211; Web of Spider-Man #112; Spider-Man #45; Amazing Spider-Man: Ashcan Edition #1	David Michelinie, J.M. DeMatteis	Mark Bagley, Steven Butler	496	16 Nov 2021	Amazing Spider-Man: Ashcan Edition cover: 978-1302930691
27	The Clone Saga	1994	Amazing Spider-Man #394-396; Spectacular Spider-Man #217-219; Web of Spider-Man #117-119; Spider-Man #51-53; Spider-Man Unlimited #7	Terry Kavanagh, J.M. DeMatteis, Howard Mackie, Tom DeFalco	Tom Lyle, Steven Butler, Mark Bagley, Sal Buscema, Liam Sharp	456	16 Jan 2024	Web of Spider-Man #118 cover: 978-1302953669
28	Web Of Life, Web Of Death	1995	Amazing Spider-Man #397-399; Spectacular Spider-Man #220-222; Web of Spider-Man #120-123; Spider-Man #54-56; Spider-Man Unlimited #8; Spider-Man: Funeral For An Octopus #1-3; Spider-Man: The Clone Journal	Howard Mackie, J.M. DeMatteis, Tom DeFalco	Tom Lyle, Steven Butler, Mark Bagley, Sal Buscema	472	5 Nov 2024	Web of Spider-Man #122 cover: 978-1302960087
29	The Mark Of Kaine	1995	Amazing Spider-Man #400-403; Spectacular Spider-Man #223-226; Web of Spider-Man #124-126; Spider-Man #57-60; Spider-Man Unlimited #9	Howard Mackie, J.M. DeMatteis, Tom DeFalco, Stan Lee, Tom Lyle	John Romita Jr., Mark Bagley, Sal Buscema, Bill Sienkiewicz, Tom Lyle	496	8 Dec 2026	Spider-Man #58 cover: 978-1302970055
30	Maximum Clonage	1995	Amazing Spider-Man #404; Web of Spider-Man # 127; Spider-Man #61; Spectacular Spider Man #227; Spider-Man: The Jackal Files; Spider-Man: Maximum Clonage Alpha; Spider-Man: Maximum Clonage Omega; New Warriors 61-62; material from Amazing Spider-Man Super Special; Spider-Man Super Special; Venom Super Special; Spectacular Spider-Man Super Special; Web of Spider-Man Super Special	Todd DeZago, J.M. DeMatteis, Howard Mackie, Tom DeFalco, David Michelinie, Evan Skolnick	Steven Butler, Mark Bagley, Tom Lyle, Eliot Brown, Ron Lim, Sal Buscema, Patch Zircher, Dave Hoover, Joe St. Pierre, Kyle Hotz, Darick Robertson, Steve Lightle	480	9 Feb 2027	Amazing Spider-Man #404 cover: 978-1302971847

=== Modern Era Epic Collections ===
Although some of Marvel's Modern Era Epic Collection releases are from as early as 1998 in the case of characters like Daredevil, Spider-Man's era starts with J. Michael Straczynski's run.

Coming Home began in Amazing Spider-Man (vol. 2), which was released in April 2001, with a cover date of June 2001.

#	Subtitle	Years covered	Issues collected	Writers	Artists	Pages	Released	ISBN
1	Coming Home	2001–2002	Amazing Spider-Man (vol. 2) #30-45	J. Michael Straczynski	John Romita Jr., J. Scott Campbell	392	29 Apr 2025	978-1302964450
2	The Life And Death Of Spiders	2002–2003	Amazing Spider-Man (vol. 2) #46-58, 500-502	J. Michael Straczynski	John Romita Jr., TBC	416	6 Jan 2026	978-1302965402
3	Sins Past	2004-2005	Amazing Spider-Man #503-518, 509 (Director's Cut)	J. Michael Straczynski	John Romita Jr., Mike Deodato Jr.	408	28 Apr 2026	978-1302967086
4	The Other	1999, 2004-2005	Amazing Spider-Man #519–528; Friendly Neighborhood Spider-Man #1–4; Marvel Knights Spider-Man #19–22; Spider-Man: The Other Sketchbook	J. Michael Straczynski, Peter David, Reginald Hudlin	Mike Deodato Jr., Mike Wieringo & Pat Lee	472	26 Jan 2027	978-1302967130
14	Big Time	2011	Amazing Spider-Man #648 (A story), 649-662, 654.1	Dan Slott, Christos N. Gage	Humberto Ramos, Reilly Brown	512	23 Sep 2025	978-1302965839
15	Spider-Island	2011-2012	Amazing Spider-Man #663-676; Amazing Spider-Man: Infested; FCBD: Spider-Man (2011); Spider-Island: Deadly Foes	Dan Slott	Humberto Ramos, Giuseppe Camuncoli, Barry Kitson	448	8 Sep 2026	978-1302967123
16	Ends Of The Earth	2012-2013	Amazing Spider-Man #677-687, 679.1; Daredevil (vol. 2) #8; Avenging Spider Man #8; Amazing Spider-Man: Ends Of The Earth	Mark Waid, Dan Slott	Emma Rios, Haim Kano	352	2 Feb 2027	978-1302970871

=== Essential Marvel ===
Running from 1996, Essential Marvel reprinted issues in black-and-white paperback format. It was discontinued in 2013 and replaced by the Epic Collection.

#	Title	Material collected	Format	Pages	Released	ISBN
1	Essential Spider-Man Vol. 1	Amazing Fantasy #15; Amazing Spider-Man #1–20, Annual #1	B&W TPB	552	1997	978-0785121923
2	Essential Spider-Man Vol. 2	Amazing Spider-Man #21–43, Annual #2–3	B&W TPB	536	1998	978-0785118633
3	Essential Spider-Man Vol. 3 (1st)	Amazing Spider-Man #44–68	B&W TPB	528	Jun 1998	978-0785106586
3	Essential Spider-Man Vol. 3 (2nd)	Amazing Spider-Man #44–65, Annual #4	B&W TPB	528	Aug 2005	978-0785118640
4	Essential Spider-Man Vol. 4 (1st)	Amazing Spider-Man #69–89, Annual #4–5	B&W TPB	544	Mar 2001	978-0785107606
4	Essential Spider-Man Vol. 4 (2nd)	Amazing Spider-Man #66–89, Annual #5	B&W TPB	544	Aug 2005	978-0785118657
5	Essential Spider-Man Vol. 5	Amazing Spider-Man #90–113	B&W TPB	528	Apr 2002	978-0785108818
6	Essential Spider-Man Vol. 6	Amazing Spider-Man #114–137; Giant-Size Super-Heroes #1; Giant-Size Spider-Man #1–2	B&W TPB	576	Jul 2004	978-0785113652
7	Essential Spider-Man Vol. 7	Amazing Spider-Man #138–160, Annual #10; Giant-Size Spider-Man #4–5	B&W TPB	528	Oct 2005	978-0785118794
8	Essential Spider-Man Vol. 8	Amazing Spider-Man #161–185, Annual #11; Giant-Size Spider-Man #6; Nova #12	B&W TPB	512	Apr 2007	978-0785125006
9	Essential Spider-Man Vol. 9	Amazing Spider-Man #186–210, Annual #13–14; Peter Parker, the Spectacular Spider-Man Annual #1	B&W TPB	600	May 2009	978-0785130741
10	Essential Spider-Man Vol. 10	Amazing Spider-Man #211–230, Annual #15	B&W TPB	504	Jul 2011	978-0785157472
11	Essential Spider-Man Vol. 11	Amazing Spider-Man #231–248, Annual #16–17	B&W TPB	504	Jun 2012	978-0785163305

== Other Spider-Man collected editions ==
=== Friendly Neighborhood Spider-Man ===
Friendly Neighborhood Spider-Man was initially written by Peter David, running for two years from December 2005 until November 2007.

==== Volume 1 (2005–2007) ====
#	Title	Material collected	Format	Pages	Released	ISBN
	Spider-Man: The Other	Amazing Spider-Man #525–528; Friendly Neighborhood Spider-Man #1–4; Marvel Knights Spider-Man #19–22	OHC	288	25 Oct 2006	978-0785121886
	Spider-Man: The Other	Amazing Spider-Man #525–528; Friendly Neighborhood Spider-Man #1–4; Marvel Knights Spider-Man #19–22	TPB	288	4 Apr 2007	Red costume: 978-0785117650
	Spider-Man: The Other	Amazing Spider-Man #525–528; Friendly Neighborhood Spider-Man #1–4; Marvel Knights Spider-Man #19–22	TPB	288	4 Apr 2007	Black costume: 978-0785128120
1	Derailed	Friendly Neighborhood Spider-Man #5–10	TPB	144	27 Sep 2006	978-0785122166
2	Mystery Date	Friendly Neighborhood Spider-Man #11–16	TPB	136	4 Apr 2007	978-0785122173
	Civil War: Spider-Man	Friendly Neighborhood Spider-Man #11–16, Amazing Spider-Man #529–538, Sensational Spider-Man #28–34	OHC	544	26 Jan 2011	978-0785148821
	Spider-Man: Back In Black	Amazing Spider-Man #539–543; Friendly Neighborhood Spider-Man #17–23, Annual #1	OHC	336	24 Oct 2007	978-0785129042
	Spider-Man: Back In Black	Amazing Spider-Man #539–543; Friendly Neighborhood Spider-Man #17–23, Annual #1	TPB	336	27 Feb 2008	978-0785129967
	Spider-Man: One More Day	Amazing Spider-Man #544–545; Sensational Spider-Man #41; Friendly Neighborhood Spider-Man #24	HC	136	9 Apr 2008	978-0785126331
	Spider-Man: One More Day	Amazing Spider-Man #544–545; Sensational Spider-Man #41; Friendly Neighborhood Spider-Man #24	TPB	136	27 Aug 2008	978-0785126348
	Friendly Neighborhood Spider-Man by Peter David: The Complete Collection	Friendly Neighborhood Spider-Man #5–23, Annual #1	TPB	480	19 Apr 2017	978-1302904364

==== Volume 2 (2019–2020) ====
Volume 2 was relaunched in March 2019, with Tom Taylor writing. It ran for 14 issues until February 2020. Taylor told Marvel's website: "Peter's humanity and kindness isn't ever hidden. He wants to do the right thing by everyone no matter whether he's on the ground or swinging through the sky.

"I've always loved when Peter Parker is at his most relatable. Sure, he's a guy who saves the world, but he's still struggling to pay his bills with his housemates. That's the heart of this series."

#	Title	Material collected	Format	Pages	Released	ISBN
1	Secrets and Rumors	Friendly Neighborhood Spider-Man (vol. 2) #1–6	TPB	144	23 Jul 2019	978-1302916909
2	Hostile Takeovers	Friendly Neighborhood Spider-Man (vol. 2) #7–14	TPB	176	28 Jan 2020	978-1302916916
	Spider-Man by Tom Taylor	Friendly Neighborhood Spider-Man (vol. 2) #1–14; material from Free Comic Book Day 2019: Spider-Man / Venom	TPB	360	28 Nov 2023	978-1302953485

=== Marvel Knights Spider-Man / The Sensational Spider-Man (vol. 2) ===
Marvel Knights Spider-Man launched in 2004 but, with issue #23, became Sensational Spider-Man (vol. 2)

#	Title	Material collected	Format	Pages	Released	ISBN
Trade paperbacks
1	Down Among The Dead Men	Marvel Knights Spider-Man #1–4	TPB	96	13 Oct 2004	978-0785114376
2	Venomous	Marvel Knights Spider-Man #5–8	TPB	96	2 Feb 2005	978-0785116752
3	The Last Stand	Marvel Knights Spider-Man #9–12	TPB	96	25 May 2005	978-0785116769
	Spider-Man by Mark Millar Ultimate Collection	Marvel Knights Spider-Man #1–12	TPB	284	28 Dec 2011	978-0785156406
4	Wild Blue Yonder	Marvel Knights Spider-Man #13–18	TPB	144	23 Nov 2005	978-0785117612
	Spider-Man: The Other	Amazing Spider-Man #525–528; Friendly Neighborhood Spider-Man #1–4; Marvel Knights Spider-Man #19–22	TPB	288	4 Apr 2007	Red costume: 978-0785117650
	Spider-Man: The Other	Amazing Spider-Man #525–528; Friendly Neighborhood Spider-Man #1–4; Marvel Knights Spider-Man #19–22	TPB	288	4 Apr 2007	Black costume: 978-0785128120
	Sensational Spider-Man: Feral	Sensational Spider-Man (vol. 2) #23–27	HC	128	1 Nov 2006	978-0785123187
	Sensational Spider-Man: Feral	Sensational Spider-Man (vol. 2) #23–27	TPB	128	25 Apr 2007	978-0785121268
	Civil War: Peter Parker, Spider-Man	Sensational Spider-Man (vol. 2) #28–34	TPB	168	23 May 2007	978-0785121893
	Peter Parker, Spider-Man – Back In Black	Sensational Spider-Man (vol. 2) #35–40, Annual #1; Spider-Man Family #1–2; Marvel Spotlight: Spider-Man; Spider-Man: Back in Black Handbook	TPB	336	19 Mar 2008	978-0785129974
	Spider-Man: One More Day	Amazing Spider-Man #544–545; Sensational Spider-Man #41; Friendly Neighborhood Spider-Man #24	HC	136	9 Apr 2008	978-0785126331
	Spider-Man: One More Day	Amazing Spider-Man #544–545; Sensational Spider-Man #41; Friendly Neighborhood Spider-Man #24	TPB	136	27 Aug 2008	978-0785126348
Oversized hardcovers
	Marvel Knights Spider-Man	Marvel Knights Spider-Man #1–12	OHC	304	16 Nov 2005	978-0785118428
	Spider-Man: The Other	Amazing Spider-Man #525–528; Friendly Neighborhood Spider-Man #1–4; Marvel Knights Spider-Man #19–22	OHC	288	25 Oct 2006	978-0785121886
	Peter Parker, Spider-Man – Back In Black	Sensational Spider-Man (vol. 2) #35–40, Annual #1; Spider-Man Family #1–2; Marvel Spotlight: Spider-Man; Spider-Man: Back in Black Handbook	OHC	336	28 Nov 2007	978-0785129202

=== Marvel Platinum ===
The Marvel Platinum series was produced by Panini UK, focusing on a different Marvel superhero each month. Its aim was to reproduce a series of "definitive" stories, largely aimed at new readers.

Title	Material collected	Released	ISBN
Marvel Platinum: The Definitive Spider-Man	Amazing Fantasy #15, Amazing Spider-Man #121–122, 300, 500, 545, 600; Amazing Spider-Man Annual #21, Sensational Spider-Man (vol. 2) #41; also contains "The True Origin of the Amazing Spider-Man" (article)	9 May 2012	978-1846535109

=== Marvel Team-Up ===
==== Volume 1 (1972-1985) ====
Marvel Team-Up launched in 1972, running until 1985. It was the first major ongoing spin-off series for Spider-Man.

#	Title	Material collected	Format	Pages	Released	ISBN
	Spider-Man/Iron Man: Marvel Team-Up	Marvel Team-Up #9–11, 48–51, 72, 110, 145	TPB	208	30 Oct 2018	978-1302913687
	Spider-Man: Marvel Team-Up by Claremont & Byrne	Marvel Team-Up #59–70, 75	TPB	240	14 Dec 2011	978-0785158660
	Fantastic Four/Spider-Man Classic	Amazing Spider-Man #1, Spectacular Spider-Man #42; Fantastic Four #218, Marvel Team-Up #100, 132–133, Untold Tales of Spider-Man Annual '96	TPB	152	20 Apr 2005	978-0785118039
1	Spider-Man: The Complete Alien Costume Saga Book 1	Amazing Spider-Man #252–258; Marvel Team-Up #141–145, Annual #7, 85; Peter Parker, the Spectacular Spider-Man #90–95	TPB	464	19 Aug 2014	978-0785188674
2	Spider-Man: The Complete Alien Costume Saga Book 2	Amazing Spider-Man #259–263; Marvel Team-Up #146–150; Peter Parker, the Spectacular Spider-Man #96–100; Web of Spider-Man #1	TPB	492	12 May 2015	978-0785190035
1	Marvel Team-Up Vol. 1	Marvel Team-Up #1-30; Daredevil #103; Giant-Size Super Heroes Featuring Spider-Man (1974); Giant-Size Spider-Man #1-2	Omnibus	840	9 Dec 2025	Gil Kane cover: 978-1302966997
1	Marvel Team-Up Vol. 1	Marvel Team-Up #1-30; Daredevil #103; Giant-Size Super Heroes Featuring Spider-Man (1974); Giant-Size Spider-Man #1-2	Omnibus	840	9 Dec 2025	Jim Starlin DM cover: 978-1302967000
2	Marvel Team-Up Vol. 2	Marvel Team-Up #31-64; Marvel Team-Up Annual #1; Giant-Size Spider-Man #4-5; Marvel Two-in-One #17; Marvel Premiere #31; Marvel Comics Calendar 1975, 1976, 1977; material from Marvel Treasury Edition #13; Marvel Tales #255, 262-263	Omnibus	984	19 Jan 2027	Gil Kane cover: 978-1302971267
2	Marvel Team-Up Vol. 2	Marvel Team-Up #31-64; Marvel Team-Up Annual #1; Giant-Size Spider-Man #4-5; Marvel Two-in-One #17; Marvel Premiere #31; Marvel Comics Calendar 1975, 1976, 1977; material from Marvel Treasury Edition #13; Marvel Tales #255, 262-263	Omnibus	984	19 Jan 2027	Dave Cockrum DM cover: 978-1302971274
Essential Marvel
1	Essential Marvel Team-Up Vol. 1	Marvel Team-Up #1–24	B&W TPB	496	22 Oct 2002	978-0785108283
1	Essential Marvel Team-Up Vol. 1	Marvel Team-Up #1–24	B&W TPB	496	2 Aug 2006	978-0785123736
2	Essential Marvel Team-Up Vol. 2	Marvel Team-Up #25–51; Marvel Two-in-One #17	B&W TPB	528	2 Aug 2006	978-0785121633
3	Essential Marvel Team-Up Vol. 3	Marvel Team-Up #52–73, 75, Annual #1	B&W TPB	480	2 Sep 2009	978-0785130680

Marvel Masterworks
#	Title	Years covered	Material collected	Pages	Released	ISBN
1	Marvel Team-Up Vol. 1	1972-73	Marvel Team-Up #1–11	248	Dec 2010	978-0785142102
2	Marvel Team-Up Vol. 2	1973-74	Marvel Team-Up #12–22	256	Jun 2012	978-0785159339
3	Marvel Team-Up Vol. 3	1974-75	Marvel Team-Up #23–30; Giant-Size Spider-Man #1–3	272	May 2018	978-1302909703
4	Marvel Team-Up Vol. 4	1975	Marvel Team-Up #31–40; Giant-Size Spider-Man #4–5	304	Jan 2019	978-1302915209
5	Marvel Team-Up Vol. 5	1975-76	Marvel Team-Up #41–52; Marvel Two-in-One #17; The Mighty Marvel Bicentennial Calendar 1976; material from Marvel Treasury #9, 13	304	Aug 2020	978-1302922184
6	Marvel Team-Up Vol. 6	1977	Marvel Team-Up #53–64, Annual #1; Marvel Premiere #31; Marvel Comics Memory Album Calendar 1977	320	Aug 2021	978-1302929312
7	Marvel Team-Up Vol. 7	1978-79	Marvel Team-Up #65–77	304	Dec 2023	978-1302933241
8	Marvel Team-Up Vol. 8	1978-80	Marvel Team-Up #78–90, Annual #2	296	Dec 2024	978-1302955571

==== Volume 3 (2005–2006) ====
Marvel Team-Up (vol. 2) ran for 11 issues from 1997–98; however, none of it has been collected. Marvel Team-Up (vol. 3) launched in 2005 and lasted 25 issues. It was written by Robert Kirkman while he was also writing Marvel Zombies, The Walking Dead and Invincible. Issue #14 saw Marvel Comics' Spider-Man meet Image Comics' Invincible.

#	Title	Material collected	Format	Pages	Released	ISBN
1	The Golden Child	Marvel Team-Up (vol. 3) #1–6	TPB	144	1 Jun 2005	978-0785115953
2	Master Of The Ring	Marvel Team-Up (vol. 3) #7–13	TPB	176	21 Dec 2005	978-0785115960
3	League Of Losers	Marvel Team-Up (vol. 3) #14–18	TPB	128	28 Jun 2006	978-0785119463
4	Freedom Ring	Marvel Team-Up (vol. 3) #19–25	TPB	168	7 Feb 2007	978-0785119906

=== The Sensational Spider-Man ===
The Sensational Spider-Man ran from 1996 to 1998, with almost all issues crossing over with the other core titles as part of the Clone Saga.

#	Title	Material collected	Format	Pages	Released	ISBN
	Spider-Man: The Savage Land Saga!	Sensational Spider-Man #13–15	TPB	Unknown	Jun 1997	978-0785105633
	Spider-Man by Todd DeZago & Mike Wieringo	Sensational Spider-Man #7–24, -1	TPB	456	6 Jun 2017	978-0785105633

=== Peter Parker: The Spectacular Spider-Man / The Spectacular Spider-Man ===
==== Volume 1 (1968) ====
The first volume of The Spectacular Spider-Man in 1968 was a black and white magazine that only lasted two issues.

Title	Material collected	Format	Pages	Released	ISBN
Spider-Man: Lo, This Monster	Spectacular Spider-Man (1968) #1-2	Oversized TPB	136	9 Dec 2025	978-1302965051

==== Volume 2 (1976-1988) ====
Eight years later, the book was relaunched as a companion comic to the main Amazing Spider-Man series and retitled Peter Parker, the Spectacular Spider-Man. After 134 issues, Peter Parker, the Spectacular Spider-Man was renamed The Spectacular Spider-Man (vol. 2), though it kept its numbering.

The series ran for 22 years and 264 monthly issues, making it the second longest-running title behind the main title.

As well as those below, many issues are collected in crossover books. Between the five Complete Clone Saga Epic Collections and the six Complete Ben Reilly Epic Collections, everything from issue #217–241 is collected.

#	Title	Material collected	Legacy	Format	Pages	Released	ISBN
	The Complete Frank Miller Spider-Man	Peter Parker, the Spectacular Spider-Man #27–28; Amazing Spider-Man Annual #14–15; Marvel Team-Up #100, Annual #4	#27-28	HC	192	Feb 1994	978-0785100546
	The Complete Frank Miller Spider-Man	Peter Parker, the Spectacular Spider-Man #27–28; Amazing Spider-Man Annual #14–15; Marvel Team-Up #100, Annual #4	#27-28	HC	208	7 May 2002	978-0785108993
	Spider-Man Visionaries: Roger Stern Vol. 1	Amazing Spider-Man #206; Peter Parker, The Spectacular Spider-Man #43–52, 54	#43-54	TPB	256	9 May 2007	978-0785127109
	Amazing Spider-Man: The Death of Jean DeWolff	Peter Parker, The Spectacular Spider-Man #107–110	#107-110	TPB	96	Apr 1991	978-0871357045
70	Spider-Man: The Death of Jean DeWolff	Peter Parker, the Spectacular Spider-Man #107–110, Spectacular Spider-Man #134–136	#107-110, #134–136	HC	168	11 Aug 2011	978-0785157212
70	Spider-Man: The Death of Jean DeWolff	Peter Parker, the Spectacular Spider-Man #107–110, Spectacular Spider-Man #134–136	#107-110, #134–136	HC	168	11 Aug 2011	DM cover: 978-0785157229
	Spider-Man: The Death of Jean DeWolff	Peter Parker, the Spectacular Spider-Man #107–110, Spectacular Spider-Man #134–136	#107-110, #134–136	TPB	168	12 Mar 2013	978-0785167143
	Spider-Man: The Road to Venom	Peter Parker, the Spectacular Spider-Man #107–110, 134–136; Amazing Spider-Man #258; Venom: Seed of Darkness (1997) #-1; Web of Spider-Man #1; Venom: Dark Origin (2008) #1–5	#107-110, #134–136	TPB	368	6 Oct 2020	978-1302926960
	Spider-Man and the Uncanny X-Men	X-Men #27, 35; Amazing Spider-Man #92; Marvel Team-Up #150, Annual #1; Spectacular Spider-Man (vol. 2) #197–199	#197-199	TPB	176	Apr 1996	978-0785102007
Omnibuses
1	The Spectacular Spider-Man Omnibus Vol. 1	Peter Parker, the Spectacular Spider-Man #1–42; Annual #1; Amazing Spider-Man Annual #13; Fantastic Four #218	#1-42	Omnibus	928	23 Nov 2022	Sal Buscema cover: 978-1302947408
1	The Spectacular Spider-Man Omnibus Vol. 1	Peter Parker, the Spectacular Spider-Man #1–42; Annual #1; Amazing Spider-Man Annual #13; Fantastic Four #218	#1-42	Omnibus	928	23 Nov 2022	Dave Cockrum DM cover: 978-1302947415
	Spectacular Spider-Man by DeMatteis & Buscema Omnibus	Spectacular Spider-Man (vol. 2) #178-216, Annual #12-14; Amazing Spider-Man: Soul Of The Hunter	#178-216	Omnibus	1,208	29 Jul 2025	Sal Buscema Green Goblin cover: 978-1302964467
	Spectacular Spider-Man by DeMatteis & Buscema Omnibus	Spectacular Spider-Man (vol. 2) #178-216, Annual #12-14; Amazing Spider-Man: Soul Of The Hunter	#178-216	Omnibus	1,208	29 Jul 2025	Sal Buscema Rhino DM cover: 978-1302964474
Essential Marvel
1	Essential Peter Parker, the Spectacular Spider-Man Vol. 1	Peter Parker, the Spectacular Spider-Man #1–31	#1-31	B&W TPB	568	2 Feb 2005	978-0785116820
2	Essential Peter Parker, the Spectacular Spider-Man Vol. 2	Peter Parker, the Spectacular Spider-Man #32–53, Annual #1–2; Amazing Spider-Man Annual #13; Fantastic Four #218	#32-53	B&W TPB	592	15 Feb 2006	978-0785120421
3	Essential Peter Parker, the Spectacular Spider-Man Vol. 3	Peter Parker, the Spectacular Spider-Man #54–74, Annual #3	#54-74	B&W TPB	536	14 Mar 2007	978-0785125013
4	Essential Peter Parker, the Spectacular Spider-Man Vol. 4	Peter Parker, the Spectacular Spider-Man #75–96, Annual #4	#75-96	B&W TPB	576	12 Aug 2009	978-0785130710
5	Essential Peter Parker, the Spectacular Spider-Man Vol. 5	Peter Parker, the Spectacular Spider-Man #97–114, Annual #5	#97-114	B&W TPB	480	10 Aug 2011	978-0785157557

Marvel Masterworks
#	Title	Years covered	Material collected	Pages	Released	ISBN
1	The Spectacular Spider-Man Vol. 1	1976-78	Peter Parker, the Spectacular Spider-Man #1–15	280	Jul 2017	978-1302903565
2	The Spectacular Spider-Man Vol. 2	1978-79	Peter Parker, the Spectacular Spider-Man #16–31	312	Jul 2019	978-1302917395
3	Peter Parker, the Spectacular Spider-Man Vol. 3	1979-80	Peter Parker, the Spectacular Spider-Man #32–42, Annual #1, Amazing Spider-Man Annual #13, Fantastic Four #218	312	Jul 2020	978-1302922368
4	The Spectacular Spider-Man Vol. 4	1980-81	Peter Parker, the Spectacular Spider-Man #43–55, Annual #2	328	Sep 2021	978-1302929435
5	The Spectacular Spider-Man Vol. 5	1981-82	Peter Parker, the Spectacular Spider-Man #56–66, Annual #3	352	Jun 2022	978-1302933401
6	The Spectacular Spider-Man Vol. 6	1982-83	Peter Parker, the Spectacular Spider-Man #67–79	336	Jun 2023	978-1302949327
7	The Spectacular Spider-Man Vol. 7	1983-84	Peter Parker, the Spectacular Spider-Man #80–91	336	Jun 2024	978-1302955298
8	The Spectacular Spider-Man Vol. 8	1984-85	Peter Parker, the Spectacular Spider-Man #92–100, Annual #4, Web Of Spider-Man #1	336	Apr 2025	978-1302962234

==== Volume 3 (2003–2005) ====
Spectacular Spider-Man (vol. 3) ran for 27 issues from September 2003 to June 2005.

#	Title	Material collected	Legacy	Format	Pages	Released	ISBN
1	The Hunger	Spectacular Spider-Man (vol. 3) #1–5	#264-268	TPB	120	30 Dec 2003	978-0785111696
2	Countdown	Spectacular Spider-Man (vol. 3) #6–10	#269-273	TPB	120	May 2004	978-0785113133
3	Here There Be Monsters	Spectacular Spider-Man (vol. 3) #11–14	#274-277	TPB	144	Oct 2004	978-0785113331
4	Disassembled	Spectacular Spider-Man (vol. 3) #15–20	#278-283	TPB	136	15 Dec 2004	978-0785116264
5	Sins Remembered	Spectacular Spider-Man (vol. 3) #23–26	#286-289	TPB	96	18 May 2005	978-0785116288
6	Final Curtain	Spectacular Spider-Man (vol. 3) #21–22, 27; Peter Parker, Spider-Man #39–41	#284-285, #290	TPB	144	19 Oct 2005	978-0785119500

==== Volume 4 (2017–2019) ====
Writer Chip Zdarsky launched Spectacular Spider-Man (vol. 4) in 2017. After six issues, the legacy numbering resumed at issue #297. The series ended with issue #313.

#	Title	Material collected	Legacy	Format	Pages	Released	ISBN
Trade paperbacks
1	Into the Twilight	Peter Parker: The Spectacular Spider-Man (vol. 4) #1–6, material from Free Comic Book Day 2017 (Secret Empire)	#291-296	TPB	144	26 Dec 2017	978-1302907563
2	Most Wanted	Peter Parker: The Spectacular Spider-Man #297–300	#297–300	TPB	112	10 Apr 2018	978-1302907570
3	Amazing Fantasy	Peter Parker: The Spectacular Spider-Man #301–303, Annual (vol. 2) #1	#301-303	TPB	112	28 Aug 2018	978-1302911188
4	Coming Home	Peter Parker: The Spectacular Spider-Man #304–310, Annual (vol. 2) #2	#304-310	TPB	112	4 Dec 2018	978-1302911195
5	Spider-Geddon	Peter Parker: The Spectacular Spider-Man #311–313, Spider-Geddon: Spider-Man Noir Video Comic, Spider-Geddon: Animated Video Comic	#311-313	TPB	112	12 Feb 2019	978-1302914530
Omnibus
	Spider-Man by Chip Zdarsky	Peter Parker: The Spectacular Spider-Man (vol. 3) #1–6, #297–310, Annual (2018); FCBD 2017: Secret Empire (Spider-Man story); Spider-Man: Life Story #1–6, Annual (2021); Spider-Man: Spider's Shadow #1–5	#291-310	Omnibus	928	12 Dec 2023	Adam Kubert cover: 978-1302952983
	Spider-Man by Chip Zdarsky	Peter Parker: The Spectacular Spider-Man (vol. 3) #1–6, #297–310, Annual (2018); FCBD 2017: Secret Empire (Spider-Man story); Spider-Man: Life Story #1–6, Annual (2021); Spider-Man: Spider's Shadow #1–5	#291-310	Omnibus	928	12 Dec 2023	Paulo Siqueira DM cover: 978-1302952990
	Spider-Man by Chip Zdarsky	Peter Parker: The Spectacular Spider-Man (vol. 3) #1–6, #297–310, Annual (2018); FCBD 2017: Secret Empire (Spider-Man story); Spider-Man: Life Story #1–6, Annual (2021); Spider-Man: Spider's Shadow #1–5	#291-310	Omnibus	928	12 Dec 2023	Chip Zdarsky DM cover: 978-1302955922
	Spider-Man by Chip Zdarsky	Peter Parker: The Spectacular Spider-Man (vol. 3) #1–6, #297–310, Annual (2018); FCBD 2017: Secret Empire (Spider-Man story); Spider-Man: Life Story #1–6, Annual (2021); Spider-Man: Spider's Shadow #1–5	#291-310	Omnibus	928	15 Sep 2026	Adam Kubert cover: 978-1302969974
	Spider-Man by Chip Zdarsky	Peter Parker: The Spectacular Spider-Man (vol. 3) #1–6, #297–310, Annual (2018); FCBD 2017: Secret Empire (Spider-Man story); Spider-Man: Life Story #1–6, Annual (2021); Spider-Man: Spider's Shadow #1–5	#291-310	Omnibus	928	15 Sep 2026	DM cover: TBC

=== The Spectacular Spider-Men (2024–2025) ===
This series launched in 2024, with Greg Wiseman as writer. It promised: "Peter Parker and Miles Morales are going to team up on the regular, comparing notes and using said notes to take on some of their most dangerous bad guys".

#	Title	Material collected	Format	Pages	Released	ISBN
1	Arachnobatics	The Spectacular Spider-Men #1–5, Web of Spider-Man (vol. 3) #1	TPB	136	8 Oct 2024	978-1302955953
2	Elementary	The Spectacular Spider-Men #6–10	TPB	112	4 Mar 2025	978-1302955960
3	Strange Love	The Spectacular Spider-Men #11–15	TPB	112	2 Sep 2025	978-1302964481

=== Spider-Man / Peter Parker: Spider-Man ===
The adjectiveless Spider-Man comic was initially launched in 1990 as a way for Todd McFarlane to take on his own book. McFarlane wrote and illustrated 15 of the first 16 issues before leaving to launch his own company, Image Comics. Many of the later issues crossed over with the other Spider-Man books.

==== Volume 1 (1990-1998) ====
#	Title	Material collected	Pages	Format	Released	ISBN
	Spider-Man: Torment	Spider-Man #1–5; "Pale Reflection" from Spectacular Spider-Man Annual #10	128	TPB	1992	978-0871358059
	X-Force And Spider-Man: Sabotage	X-Force #3-4; Spider-Man #16	96	TPB	Nov 1992	978-0871359537
	Spider-Man: Revenge Of The Sinister Six	Spider-Man #18–23	176	TPB	Nov 1994	978-0785100478
	Spider-Man by Todd McFarlane: The Complete Collection	Spider-Man #1–14	440	TPB	9 Mar 2021	978-1302923730
Marvel Premiere Classic hardcovers
27	Spider-Man: Torment	Spider-Man #1–5, material from Marvel Age #90	144	HC	29 Jul 2009	978-0785137917
27	Spider-Man: Torment	Spider-Man #1–5, material from Marvel Age #90	144	HC	29 Jul 2009	DM: 978-0785137924
83	Spider-Man: Masques	Spider-Man #6–7, 13–14, 16; X-Force #4	144	HC	18 Jan 2012	978-0785159438
83	Spider-Man: Masques	Spider-Man #6–7, 13–14, 16; X-Force #4	144	HC	18 Jan 2012	DM: 978-0785159445
96	Spider-Man: Perceptions	Spider-Man #8–12	120	HC	27 Jun 2012	978-0785160526
96	Spider-Man: Perceptions	Spider-Man #8–12	120	HC	27 Jun 2012	DM: 978-0785160533
103	Spider-Man: Revenge of the Sinister Six	Spider-Man #15 and 18–23	176	HC	5 Sep 2012	978-0785160564
103	Spider-Man: Revenge of the Sinister Six	Spider-Man #15 and 18–23	176	HC	5 Sep 2012	DM: 978-0785160571
Omnibus
	Spider-Man by Todd McFarlane Omnibus	Spider-Man #1–14, 16; X-Force #4	440	Omnibus	16 Aug 2016	Todd McFarlane cover: 978-1302900731
	Spider-Man by Todd McFarlane Omnibus	Spider-Man #1–14, 16; X-Force #4	440	Omnibus	7 Sep 2021	Todd McFarlane cover: 978-1302928391
	Spider-Man by Todd McFarlane Omnibus	Spider-Man #1–14, 16; X-Force #4	440	Omnibus	7 Sep 2021	Todd McFarlane Black Costume cover: 978-1302928407

==== Volume 2 (1999-2003) ====
After 98 issues, the adjectiveless Spider-Man series was relaunched as Peter Parker: Spider-Man (vol. 2). At first it was a continuation of the previous book - but with issue #20, an all-British creative team, Paul Jenkins and Mark Buckingham, took over.

#	Title	Material collected	Pages	Format	Released	ISBN
1	Peter Parker: Spider-Man Vol. 1: A Day in the Life	Webspinners: Tales of Spider-Man #10–12; Peter Parker: Spider-Man (vol. 2) #20–22, 25	160	TPB	Jun 2001	978-0785107774
	Spider-Man: Revenge of the Green Goblin	Spider-Man: Revenge of the Green Goblin #1–3, Amazing Spider-Man (vol. 2) #25, Peter Parker: Spider-Man (vol. 2) #25	160	TPB	8 Apr 2002	978-0785108733
2	Peter Parker: Spider-Man Vol. 2: One Small Break	Peter Parker: Spider-Man (vol. 2) #27–28, 30-34	160	TPB	Apr 2002	978-0785108245
3	Peter Parker: Spider-Man Vol. 3: Return of the Goblin	Peter Parker: Spider-Man (vol. 2) #44–47	96	TPB	Nov 2002	978-0785110194
4	Peter Parker: Spider-Man Vol. 4: Trials and Tribulations	Peter Parker: Spider-Man (vol. 2) #35, 37, 48–50	128	TPB	5 May 2003	978-0785111504
5	Peter Parker: Spider-Man Vol. 5: Senseless Violence	Peter Parker: Spider-Man (vol. 2) #51–57	160	TPB	29 Sep 2003	978-0785111719

==== Volume 3 (2022–2023) ====
A new adjectiveless Spider-Man series launched in 2022 to mark the character's 60th anniversary. The book was written by Dan Slott, with art from Mark Bagley. It was pitched as the pair "teaming up for the first time on Spidey to unleash the full potential of the Spider-Verse."

After 11 issues, the series relaunched as Spider-Boy.

#	Title	Material collected	Pages	Format	Released	ISBN
1	End Of The Spider-Verse	Spider-Man (vol. 3) #1–7	176	TPB	6 Jun 2023	978-1302946562
2	Who Is Spider-Boy?	Spider-Man (vol. 3) #8–11	112	TPB	14 Nov 2023	978-1302946579
1	The Web-Less Wonder	Spider-Boy #1-4; material from Amazing Spider-Man (vol. 6) #31	136	TPB	30 Apr 2024	978-1302957155
2	Fun & Games	Spider-Boy #5-8	136	TPB	10 Sep 2024	978-1302957162
3	The Dragon's Challenge	Spider-Boy #11-16	136	TPB	1 Jul 2025	978-1302960377
4	Full Circle	Spider-Boy #17-20; Kidpool/Spider-Boy (2024) #1	136	TPB	11 Nov 2025	978-1302963163

=== Spider-Man/Deadpool ===
#	Title	Material collected	Format	Pages	Released	ISBN
0	Don't Call It A Team-Up	Deadpool (1997) #11, Cable & Deadpool #24, Amazing Spider-Man (1963) #611, Deadpool (2008) #19–21, Avenging Spider-Man #12–13, Deadpool (2012) #10, Annual #2	TPB	272	24 May 2016	978-1302900847
1	Isn't It Bromantic	Spider-Man/Deadpool #1–5, 8	TPB	136	13 Sep 2016	978-0785197867
2	Side Pieces	Spider-Man/Deadpool #1.MU, 6–7, 11–12	TPB	120	20 Jun 2017	978-0785199922
3	Itsy Bitsy	Spider-Man/Deadpool #9–10, 13–14, 17–18	TPB	136	3 Oct 2017	978-0785197874
4	Serious Business	Spider-Man/Deadpool #19–22	TPB	112	16 Jan 2018	978-1302908065
5	Arms Race	Spider-Man/Deadpool #23–28	TPB	112	24 Apr 2018	978-1302910471
6	WLMD	Spider-Man/Deadpool #29–33	TPB	136	31 Jul 2018	978-1302910488
7	My Two Dads	Spider-Man/Deadpool #34–39	TPB	136	11 Dec 2018	978-1302910495
8	Roadtrip	Spider-Man/Deadpool #40–45	TPB	136	26 Mar 2019	978-1302911126
9	Eventpool	Spider-Man/Deadpool #46–50	TPB	112	23 Jul 2019	978-1302914639
	Spider-Man / Deadpool by Joe Kelly & Ed McGuinness	Spider-Man/Deadpool #1–5, 8–10, 13–14, 17–18	TPB	264	20 Mar 2018	978-1302903725
Modern Era Epic Collections
1	Isn't It Bromantic?	Spider-Man / Deadpool #1-14, 17–18, 1.MU	TPB	400	31 Oct 2023	Spider-Man / Deadpool #13 cover: 978-1302951641
2	Til Death Do Us	Spider-Man / Deadpool #15-16, 19-32; Deadpool (vol. 6) #28-29; Deadpool And The Mercs For Money #9-10	TPB	440	3 Sep 2024	Spider-Man / Deadpool #31 cover: 978-1302959838
3	Road Trip	Spider-Man / Deadpool #33-50	TPB	416	2 Sep 2025	Spider-Man / Deadpool #33 cover: 978-1302965600
Paperback Omnibuses produced by Panini UK for the EU market
1	Spider-Man/Deadpool Omnibus	Spider-Man / Deadpool #1–18	TPB Omnibus	396	1 Jun 2022	978-1804910313
2	Spider-Man/Deadpool Omnibus	Spider-Man / Deadpool #19–33	TPB Omnibus	356	1 Jun 2023	978-1804910313

=== Spider-Man & Wolverine (2025-) ===
#	Title	Material collected	Format	Pages	Released	ISBN
1	The Janus Directory	Spider-Man & Wolverine (2025) #1-5	TPB	136	20 Jan 2026	978-1302965075
2	Life & Death Choices	Spider-Man & Wolverine (2025) #6-10	TPB	112	9 Jun 2026	978-1302965082

=== Spider-Man Family ===
#	Title	Material collected	Format	Pages	Released	ISBN
1	Back in Black	Spider-Man Family #1–3	Digest	104	19 Sep 2007	978-0785126263
2	Untold Team-Ups	Spider-Man Family #4–6	Digest	104	26 Mar 2008	978-0785126270
3	Itsy-Bitsy Battles	Spider-Man Family #7–9	Digest	104	8 Oct 2008	978-0785129882
	Family Ties	Amazing Spider-Man Family #1–3; Marvel Graphic Novel No. 72 - Spider-Man: Fear Itself	HC	152	27 May 2009	978-0785138259
	Family Ties	Amazing Spider-Man Family #1–3; Marvel Graphic Novel No. 72 - Spider-Man: Fear Itself	TPB	152	19 Aug 2009	978-0785135173
	The Short Halloween	Amazing Spider-Man Family #4–6; Spider-Man: The Short Halloween	HC	152	11 Nov 2009	978-0785139027
	The Short Halloween	Amazing Spider-Man Family #4–6; Spider-Man: The Short Halloween	TPB	152	24 Mar 2010	978-0785138785

=== Spider-Man's Tangled Web ===
#	Title	Material collected	Format	Pages	Released	ISBN
1	Spider-Man's Tangled Web Vol. 1	Tangled Web: The Thousand #1–4; Spider-Man's Tangled Web #5–6	TPB	144	19 Nov 2001	978-0785108030
2	Spider-Man's Tangled Web Vol. 2	Spider-Man's Tangled Web #7–11	TPB	128	15 Apr 2002	978-0785108740
3	Spider-Man's Tangled Web Vol. 3	Spider-Man's Tangled Web #12–17	TPB	160	28 Oct 2002	978-0785109518
4	Spider-Man's Tangled Web Vol. 4	Spider-Man's Tangled Web #18–22; Peter Parker: Spider-Man #42–43	TPB	176	31 Mar 2003	978-0785110644
	Spider-Man's Tangled Web Omnibus	Tangled Web: The Thousand #1–4; Spider-Man's Tangled Web #5–22	Omnibus	560	27 Jun 2017	978-1302906825

=== Superior Spider-Man ===
==== Volume 2 (2018–2019) ====
The first volume of Superior Spider-Man is a core title that continued legacy numbering from Amazing Spider-Man (vol. 2). The second is a separate series, launching in December 2018, with a cover date of February 2019. It ran for 12 issues and 10 months.

#	Title	Material collected	Format	Pages	Released	ISBN
1	Full Otto	The Superior Spider-Man (vol. 2) #1–6	TPB	136	3 Jul 2019	978-1302914806
2	Otto-Matic	The Superior Spider-Man (vol. 2) #7–12	TPB	136	17 Dec 2019	978-1302914813

==== Volume 3 (2023–2024) ====
Marvel pitched a third volume as: "The spider-team that redefined the AMAZING SPIDER-MAN returns to celebrate the TEN-YEAR ANNIVERSARY of the most monumental and shocking Spidey story in a generation!". This meant Dan Slott was returning to write Spider-Man after his 10-year run on the core title. No issues were solicited after #8.

#	Title	Material collected	Format	Pages	Released	ISBN
1	Supernova	Superior Spider-Man Returns, The Superior Spider-Man (vol. 3) #1–4, material from Amazing Spider-Man (vol. 6) #31	TPB	152	30 Apr 2024	978-1302955939
2	Spider-Island	The Superior Spider-Man (vol. 3) #5–8	TPB	112	17 Sep 2024	978-1302955946

=== Untold Tales of Spider-Man ===
#	Title	Material collected	Format	Pages	Released	ISBN
	Untold Tales of Spider-Man	Untold Tales of Spider-Man #1–8	TPB	176	16 Feb 1997	978-0785102632
	Spider-Man Visionaries: Kurt Busiek Vol. 1	Untold Tales of Spider-Man #1–8	TPB	176	2006	978-0785122043
1	Untold Tales of Spider-Man: The Complete Collection Vol. 1	Amazing Fantasy (vol. 2) #16–18, Untold Tales of Spider-Man #1–14	TPB	400	23 Nov 2021	978-1302931773
2	Untold Tales of Spider-Man: The Complete Collection Vol. 2	Untold Tales of Spider-Man #15–25, -1; Annual '96, Annual '97; Untold Tales of Spider-Man: Strange Encounter; material from Amazing Spider-Man Annual #37	TPB			978-1302933654
	Untold Tales of Spider-Man Omnibus	Amazing Fantasy (vol. 2) #16–18, Untold Tales of Spider-Man #1–25, -1, Annual '96, Annual '97, Untold Tales of Spider-Man: Strange Encounter, material from Amazing Spider-Man Annual #37	Omnibus	808	25 Aug 2012	978-0785162476
	Untold Tales of Spider-Man Omnibus	Amazing Fantasy (vol. 2) #16–18, Untold Tales of Spider-Man #1–25, -1, Annual '96, Annual '97, Untold Tales of Spider-Man: Strange Encounter, material from Amazing Spider-Man Annual #37	Omnibus	808	11 May 2021	978-1302928612

=== Web of Spider-Man ===
==== Volume 1 (1985-1995) ====
The first volume of Web of Spider-Man ran for 129 issues from 1985 to 1995. Many of the issues are collected in crossover books.

#	Title	Material collected	Format	Pages	Released	ISBN
Essential Marvel
1	Essential Marvel: Web of Spider-Man Vol. 1	Web of Spider-Man #1–18, Annual #1–2	B&W TPB	528	14 Sep 2011	978-0785157564
2	Essential Marvel: Web of Spider-Man Vol. 2	Web of Spider-Man #19–32, Annual #3	B&W TPB	480	25 Jul 2012	978-0785163329
Paperback
	Spirits Of Venom	Web of Spider-Man #95–96; Ghost Rider/Blaze: Spirits Of Vengeance #5-6	TPB	96	Dec 1993	978-0785100096
Omnibus
1	Web of Spider-Man Omnibus Vol. 1	Web of Spider-Man #1–34, Annual #1–3; Amazing Spider-Man #268, 293–295; Peter Parker, the Spectacular Spider-Man #131–133	Omnibus	1,128	18 Mar 2025	Charles Vess cover: 978-1302963866
1	Web of Spider-Man Omnibus Vol. 1	Web of Spider-Man #1–34, Annual #1–3; Amazing Spider-Man #268, 293–295; Peter Parker, the Spectacular Spider-Man #131–133	Omnibus	1,128	18 Mar 2025	Mike Zeck DM cover: 978-1302963873
1	Web of Spider-Man Omnibus Vol. 1	Web of Spider-Man #1–34, Annual #1–3; Amazing Spider-Man #268, 293–295; Peter Parker, the Spectacular Spider-Man #131–133	Omnibus	1,128	18 Mar 2025	Greg Larocque DM cover: 978-1302964535
2	Web of Spider-Man Vol. 2	Web of Spider-Man #35–72, Annual #4-6; Amazing Spider-Man #312–313, 329; Spectacular Spider-Man #143, 146-147, 150-153, 158; Incredible Hulk #349	Omnibus	1,360	12 May 2026	Bob Budiansky Hobgoblin cover: 978-1302968571
2	Web of Spider-Man Vol. 2	Web of Spider-Man #35–72, Annual #4-6; Amazing Spider-Man #312–313, 329; Spectacular Spider-Man #143, 146-147, 150-153, 158; Incredible Hulk #349	Omnibus	1,360	12 May 2026	Alex Saviuk Spider-Hulk DM cover: 978-1302968588

==== Volume 2 (2009–2010) ====
The second volume ran for 12 issues from 2009 to 2010. Issues #1–7 are included with The Gauntlet and Grim Hunt main title crossovers.

#	Title	Material collected	Format	Pages	Released	ISBN
	New York Stories	Backup stories from Web of Spider-Man (vol. 2) #1, 3–5, 7–11	TPB	152	4 May 2011	978-0785156376
	The Extremist	Web of Spider-Man (vol. 2) #8–12	TPB	144	25 May 2011	978-0785156703

== Miniseries ==
Title	Years covered	Material collected	Format	Pages	Released	ISBN
Trade paperbacks
The Deadly Foes of Spider-Man	1991-1993	The Deadly Foes of Spider-Man #1–3; The Lethal Foes of Spider-Man #1–4	TPB	208	9 Nov 2011	978-0785158554
The Mutant Agenda	1994	Spider-Man: The Mutant Agenda #0–3; Marvel Team-Up #90	TPB	136	12 Dec 2012	978-0785160540
The Complete Clone Saga Epic Book 1	1995	The Lost Years #1–3 and other material	TPB	424	14 Apr 2010	978-0785144625
The Complete Clone Saga Epic Book 2	1995	Funeral for an Octopus #1–3 and other material	TPB	488	8 Jun 2010	978-0785143512
Web of Life, Web of Death Epic Collection	1995	Funeral for an Octopus #1–3 and other material	TPB	472	5 Nov 2024	978-1302960087
The Complete Ben Reilly Epic Book 2	1996	Spider-Man/Punisher: Family Plot #1–2 and other material	TPB	406	9 Nov 2011	978-0785156123
The Complete Ben Reilly Epic Book 3	1995-1996	The Final Adventure #1–4 and other material	TPB	426	25 Jan 2012	978-0785156130
The Complete Ben Reilly Epic Book 4	1996	Spider-Man: Redemption #1–4 and other material	TPB	464	1 Apr 2012	978-0785161318
Spider-Man: The Daily Bugle	1996-2004	Daily Bugle #1–3; Deadline #1–4; Spider-Man's Tangled Web #20; material from Spectacular Spider-Man (vol. 2) #205–207, Marvel Holiday Special (2004)	TPB	120	10 Oct 2017	978-1302907938
Hobgoblin Lives!	1997	Spider-Man: Hobgoblin Lives #1–3	TPB	112	Jan 1998	978-0785105855
Hobgoblin Lives! (new version)	1997	Spider-Man: Hobgoblin Lives #1–3, The Spectacular Spider-Man (vol. 2) #259–261	TPB	184	25 May 2011	978-0785155126
Spider-Man: Revenge of the Green Goblin	2000	Spider-Man: Revenge of the Green Goblin #1–3, Amazing Spider-Man (vol. 2) #25, Peter Parker: Spider-Man #25	TPB	160	8 Apr 2002	978-0785108733
Spider-Man: Revenge of the Green Goblin (alternate edition)	2000	Amazing Spider-Man (vol. 2) #20–29; Peter Parker, Spider-Man (vol. 2) #25, 29; Spider-Man: Revenge of the Green Goblin #1–3	TPB	440	12 Sep 2017	978-1302907006
Daredevil/Spider-Man: Unusual Suspects	2001	Daredevil/Spider-Man #1–4	TPB	96	Sep 2001	978-1302907006
Spider-Man: Quality of Life	2002	Spider-Man: Quality of Life #1–4	TPB	112	Dec 2002	978-0785110118
Spider-Man: Blue	2002	Spider-Man: Blue #1–6	HC	144	14 Jan 2009	978-0785134466
Spider-Man: Blue	2002	Spider-Man: Blue #1–6	TPB	144	10 Aug 2011	978-0785110712
Spider-Man's Get Kraven	2002–2003	Spider-Man's Get Kraven #1––6	TPB	208	20 Aug 2004	978-0785110125
The Evil that Men Do	2002–2006	Spider-Man/Black Cat: The Evil that Men Do #1–6	HC	176	9 May 2007	978-0785110798
The Evil that Men Do	2002–2006	Spider-Man/Black Cat: The Evil that Men Do #1–6	TPB	176	17 May 2006	978-0785110958
Marvel Legends: Spider-Man/Wolverine	2003	Spider-Man/Wolverine #1–4, Spider-Man/Daredevil one-shot	TPB	144	1 Mar 2004	978-0785112976
Spider-Man/Doctor Octopus: Negative Exposure	2003–2004	Spider-Man/Doctor Octopus: Negative Exposure #1–5	TPB	120	Jun 2004	978-0785113300
Spider-Man/Doctor Octopus: Out of Reach	2004	Spider-Man/Doctor Octopus: Out of Reach #1–5	Digest	96	Jun 2004	978-0785113607
Spider-Man/Doctor Octopus: Year One	2004	Spider-Man/Doctor Octopus: Year One #1–5	TPB	120	12 Feb 2019	978-1302915452
Spider-Man / Human Torch: I'm With Stupid	2005	Spider-Man/Human Torch #1–5	Digest	120	24 Aug 2005	978-0785117230
Spider-Man: Breakout	2005	Spider-Man: Breakout #1–5	TPB	120	21 Dec 2005	978-0785118077
Spider-Man: House Of M	2005–2006	Spider-Man: House of M (2005) #1–5	TPB	120	8 Mar 2006	978-0785117537
Spider-Man and the Fantastic Four: Silver Rage	2007	Spider-Man and the Fantastic Four #1–4	TPB	96	24 Oct 2007	978-0785126737
Spider-Man - Red Sonja	2008	Spider-Man-Red Sonja #1–5; Marvel Team-Up #79	TPB	144	24 Sep 2008	978-0785127444
With Great Power...	2008	Spider-Man: With Great Power... #1–5	HC	120	12 Nov 2008	978-0785119685
Secret Invasion: Spider-Man	2008	Secret Invasion: Spider-Man #13; Amazing Spider-Man Annual (2008)	TPB	112	8 Apr 2009	978-0785132707
Spider-Man: The Real Clone Saga	2009	Spider-Man: The Clone Saga (2009) #1–6	OHC	144	26 May 2010	978-0785144243
Spider-Man: The Real Clone Saga	2009	Spider-Man: The Clone Saga (2009) #1–6	TPB	144	22 Dec 2010	978-0785148050
X-Men And Spider-Man	2009	X-Men/Spider-Man #1–4; X-Men #35	HC	128	24 Jun 2009	978-0785139539
Spider-Man and the Secret Wars	2009–2010	Spider-Man & The Secret Wars #1–4, Secret Wars #1	TPB	120	7 Jul 2010	978-0785144496
Fever	2010	Spider-Man: Fever #1–3, Amazing Spider-Man Annual #2	TPB	96	22 Sep 2010	978-0785141259
Peter Parker: Girls Gone Wild	2010	Peter Parker #1–5	TPB	136	10 Nov 2010	978-0785145912
World War Hulks: Hulked Out Heroes	2010	Spider-Man & Thor #1–2 and other material	TPB	112	10 Nov 2010	978-0785143710
Astonishing Spider-Man & Wolverine	2010–2011	Astonishing Spider-Man & Wolverine #1–6	TPB	168	10 Aug 2011	978-0785148906
Spider-Man: Spider-Island Companion	2011–2012	Spider-Island: The Amazing Spider-Girl #1–3, Spider-Island: Cloak & Dagger #1–3, Spider-Island: Deadly Hands of Kung Fu #1–3, Herc #7–8, Spider-Island: Avengers #1, Spider-Island: Spider-Woman #1, Black Panther #524, Spider-Island: Heroes for Hire #1, Spider-Island Spotlight #1	OHC	424	29 Feb 2012	978-0785162285
Spider-Man: Spider-Island Companion	2011–2012	Spider-Island: The Amazing Spider-Girl #1–3, Spider-Island: Cloak & Dagger #1–3, Spider-Island: Deadly Hands of Kung Fu #1–3, Herc #7–8, Spider-Island: Avengers #1, Spider-Island: Spider-Woman #1, Black Panther #524, Spider-Island: Heroes for Hire #1, Spider-Island Spotlight #1	TPB	360	29 Oct 2012	978-0785162292
Fear Itself: Spider-Man	2012	Fear Itself: Spider-Man #1–3; Fear Itself: The Worthy; Fear Itself: FF #1	HC	112	4 Apr 2012	978-0785158042
Spider-Men	2012	Spider-Men #1–5	OHC	128	28 Nov 2012	978-0785165330
Spider-Men	2012	Spider-Men #1–5	TPB	128	13 Dec 2012	978-1846535208
The Superior Foes of Spider-Man	2013–2015	The Superior Foes of Spider-Man #1–17	TPB	376	16 Jun 2026	978-1302968939
Who Am I?	2014	Amazing Spider-Man: Who Am I? Infinite Comic #1–12	HC	152	3 Mar 2015	978-0785184584
Spider-Verse	2015	The Amazing Spider-Man (vol. 3) #7–15, Superior Spider-Man #32–33, Free Comic Book Day: Guardians of the Galaxy #1 (five-page Spider-Man story), Spider-Verse (vol. 2) #1–2, Spider-Verse Team-Up #1–3, Scarlet Spiders #1–3, Spider-Woman (vol. 5) #1–4, Spider-Man 2099 (vol. 2) #6–8	TPB	648	10 Mar 2016	978-0785190363
Spider-Island: Warzones!	2015	Spider-Island #1–5	TPB	120	26 Nov 2015	978-0785198857
Spider-Man and the X-Men	2015	Spider-Man and the X-Men #1–6	TPB	144	6 Aug 2015	978-0785197003
Amazing Spider-Man & Silk: The Spider(fly) Effect	2016	Amazing Spider-Man & Silk: The Spider(fly) Effect #1–4	TPB	128	4 Oct 2016	978-1302902315
Civil War II: Amazing Spider-Man	2016	Civil War II: Amazing Spider-Man #1–3, Amazing Spider-Man (vol. 4) #7–8	TPB	120	15 Nov 2016	978-1302902506
The Clone Conspiracy	2016–2017	Amazing Spider-Man (vol. 4) #19–24; The Clone Conspiracy #1–5; The Clone Conspiracy: Omega; Silk #14–17; Prowler #1–5; material from Free Comic Book Day 2016 (Captain America)	TPB	496	28 Dec 2017	978-1302905996
Spider-Men II	2017–2018	Spider-Men II #1–5	TPB	112	21 Mar 2018	978-1302908836
Symbiote Spider-Man	2019	Symbiote Spider-Man #1–5	TPB	120	29 Oct 2019	978-1302919047
War of the Realms: Spider-Man/Daredevil	2019	War of the Realms: Amazing Spider-Man #1–3, War Scrolls #1–3	TPB	112	10 Sep 2019	978-1302919283
Symbiote Spider-Man: Alien Reality	2020	Symbiote Spider-Man: Alien Reality #1–5	TPB	120	11 Aug 2020	978-1302921453
King in Black: Symbiote Spider-Man	2020–2021	King in Black: Symbiote Spider-Man #1–5	TPB	128	6 Jul 2021	978-1302927578
Sinister War	2021	Sinister War #1–4	TPB	128	23 Nov 2021	978-1302931070
Non-Stop Spider-Man: Big Brain Play	2021	Non-Stop Spider-Man #1-5	TPB	128	4 Jan 2022	978-1302927486
Symbiote Spider-Man: Crossroads	2021	Symbiote Spider-Man: Crossroads #1–5	TPB	120	25 Jan 2022	978-1302928001
Ben Reilly: Spider-Man	2022	Ben Reilly: Spider-Man #1–5	TPB	112	13 Sep 2022	978-1302932183
Savage Spider-Man	2022	Savage Spider-Man #1–5	TPB	120	29 Nov 2022	978-1302945886
Deadly Neighborhood Spider-Man	2023	Deadly Neighborhood Spider-Man #1–5	TPB	120	23 May 2023	978-1302947149
The Lost Hunt	2023	Spider-Man: The Lost Hunt #1–5	TPB	120	27 Jun 2023	978-1302948078
Spine-Tingling Spider-Man	2023	Spine-Tingling Spider-Man #0–4	TPB	144	23 Apr 2024	978-1302954208
Amazing Spider-Man: Blood Hunt	2023–2024	Amazing Spider-Man: Blood Hunt #1–3; Amazing Spider-Man (vol. 6) #49; Miles Morales Spider-Man #21–22	TPB	144	5 Nov 2024	978-1302958619
Symbiote Spider-Man 2099	2023–2024	Symbiote Spider-Man 2099 #1–5	TPB	120	7 Jan 2025	978-1302949969
Spider-Man: Black Suit & Blood	2024	Spider-Man: Black Suit & Blood #1–4	Treasury Edition TPB	136	1 Apr 2025	978-1302960131
Spider-Man: Black Suit & Blood	2024	Spider-Man: Black Suit & Blood #1–4	TPB	136	2 Dec 2025	978-1302960148
Venom War: Spider-Man/Lethal Protectors	2024	Venom War: Spider-Man #1–4; Venom War: Lethal Protectors #1–3; Venom War: Fantastic Four; Venom War: It's Jeff	TPB	232	22 Apr 2025	978-1302960063
Spider Society	2024–2025	Spider-Society #1-4, material from Web of Spider-Man (2024) #1	TPB	136	15 Jul 2025	978-1302959272
Predator vs. Spider-Man	2025	Predator vs. Spider-Man #1-4	TPB	112	30 Sep 2025	978-1302963354
Torn	2025-2026	Amazing Spider-Man: Torn #1-5	TPB	120	7 Jul 2026	978-1302964726
Spider-Versity	2026	Amazing Spider-Man: Spider-Versity #1-5	TPB	120	26 Jan 2027	978-1302969554
Spectacular Spider-Man: Brand New Day	2026	Spectacular Spider-Man: Brand New Day #1-5	TPB	120	9 Feb 2027	978-1302969561
Spider-Man: Long Way Home	2026	Spider-Man: Long Way Home #1-5	HC	128	16 Mar 2027	978-1302969424
Punisher Vs. Spider-Man	2026	Punisher vs. Spider-Man #1-5	TPB	120	20 Apr 2027	978-1302969295
Spider-Man / Hulk: Fire And Brimstone	2026-2027	Spider-Man/Hulk: Fire And Brimstone #1-4; Giant-Size Amazing Spider-Man (2025) #1 (A story)	TPB	144	18 May 2027	978-1302968595
Marvel Gallery Edition hardcover
Jeph Loeb & Tim Sale: Spider-Man	2002	Spider-Man: Blue (2002) #1–6	Gallery HC	168	4 Jul 2023	978-1302951528
Jeph Loeb & Tim Sale: Spider-Man	2002	Spider-Man: Blue (2002) #1–6	Gallery HC	168	4 Jul 2023	DM cover: 978-1302952396
Oversized hardcovers
Spider-Man: The Graphic Novels	1986-1992	Marvel Graphic Novel #22: Amazing Spider-Man: Hooky; #46: Parallel Lives; #63: Spirits Of The Earth; '#72: Fear Itself	OHC	280	13 Jun 2012	Charles Vess cover: 978-0785160656
Spider-Man / Human Torch	2005	Spider-Man / Human Torch #1–5	OHC	128	19 Aug 2009	978-0785140047
Yellow, Blue & Gray by Jeph Loeb and Tim Sale	2001–2004	Daredevil: Yellow #1–6; Spider-Man: Blue #1–6; Hulk: Gray #1–6	OHC	540	19 Aug 2014	978-0785188315
Spider-Verse	2015	Amazing Spider-Man (vol. 3) #7–15, Superior Spider-Man #32–33, Free Comic Book Day: Guardians of the Galaxy #1 (five-page Spider-Man story), Spider-Verse (vol. 2) #1–2, Spider-Verse Team-Up #1–3, Scarlet Spiders #1–3, Spider-Woman (vol. 5) #1–4, Spider-Man 2099 (vol. 2) #6–8	OHC	648	12 May 2015	978-0785190356
The Clone Conspiracy	2016–2017	Amazing Spider-Man (vol. 4) #19–24; The Clone Conspiracy #1–5; The Clone Conspiracy: Omega; Silk #14–17; Prowler #1–5; material from Free Comic Book Day 2016 (Captain America)	OHC	560	27 Apr 2017	978-1302903268
Omnibuses
DC Versus Marvel Omnibus	1976, 1995	Superman vs. The Amazing Spider-Man, Spider-Man and Batman: Disordered Minds, Batman & Spider-Man: New Age Dawning and other material	Omnibus	1,096	29 Oct 2024	George Perez cover: 978-1779523259
DC Versus Marvel Omnibus	1976, 1995	Superman vs. The Amazing Spider-Man, Spider-Man and Batman: Disordered Minds, Batman & Spider-Man: New Age Dawning and other material	Omnibus	1,096	29 Oct 2024	Jim Lee DM cover: 978-1779528827
Spider-Man: The Clone Saga Omnibus Vol. 1	1995	Funeral for an Octopus #1–3 and other material	Omnibus	1,240	16 Nov 2016	978-1302902162
Spider-Man: The Clone Saga Omnibus Vol. 2	1995	The Lost Years #1–3 and other material	Omnibus	1,288	14 Nov 2017	978-1302907983
Spider-Man: Ben Reilly Omnibus Vol. 1	1995-1996	The Final Adventure #1–4, Spider-Man/Punisher: Family Plot #1–2 and other material	Omnibus	1,304	15 Jan 2019	978-1302913854
Spider-Man: Ben Reilly Omnibus Vol. 2	1996	Spider-Man: Redemption #1–4 and other material	Omnibus	1,304	23 Feb 2020	978-1302925208
Yellow, Blue, Gray and White by Jeph Loeb and Tim Sale Omnibus	2001–2015	Daredevil: Yellow #1–6; Spider-Man: Blue #1–6; Hulk: Gray #1–6; Captain America: White #0–5	Omnibus	664	4 Dec 2018	978-0785198376
House of M Omnibus	2005–2006	House of M (2005) #1–8; Spider-Man: House of M (2005) #1–5, plus other tie-ins	Omnibus	1,368	10 Jan 2023	Oliver Coipel cover: 978-1302948221
House of M Omnibus	2005–2006	House of M (2005) #1–8; Spider-Man: House of M (2005) #1–5, plus other tie-ins	Omnibus	1,368	10 Jan 2023	Esad Ribic DM cover: 978-1302948238
The Superior Foes of Spider-Man Omnibus	2013–2015	The Superior Foes of Spider-Man #1–17	Omnibus	376	2 Feb 2016	978-0785198376
Spider-Verse / Spider-Geddon Omnibus	2014–2018	Edge of Spider-Verse (2014) #1–5; Spider-Verse (2014) #1–2; Superior Spider-Man (2013) #32–33, and more: Amazing Spider-Man (vol. 3) #7–15; Spider-Man 2099 (2014) #5–8; Scarlet Spiders (2014) #1–3; Spider-Woman (2014) #1–4; Spider-Verse Team-Up (2014) #1–3; material from FCBD 2014: Guardians of the Galaxy; Edge of Spider-Geddon (2018) #1–4; Spider-Geddon (2018) #0–5; Superior Octopus (2018) #1; Spider-Force (2018) #1–3; Spider-Girls (2018) #1–3; Peter Parker, the Spectacular Spider-Man (2017) #311–313; Spider-Gwen: Ghost-Spider (2018) #1–4; Vault of Spiders (2018) #1–2; Spider-Geddon: Spider-Man Noir Video Comic (2018); Spider-Geddon: Spider-Gwen - Ghost-Spider Video Comic (2018); Spider-Geddon: Spider-Man Video Comic (2018); Spider-Geddon Handbook (2018)	Omnibus	1,440	21 Feb 2023	Olivier Coipel cover: 978-1302947422
Spider-Verse / Spider-Geddon Omnibus	2014–2018		Omnibus	1,440	21 Feb 2023	Giuseppe Camuncoli DM cover: 978-1302947439
Secret Wars: Battleworld Vol. 1	2015	Amazing Spider-Man: Renew Your Vows (2015) #1-5, and other material	Omnibus	1,288	28 Jan 2025	Jim Cheung cover: 978-1302959685
Secret Wars: Battleworld Vol. 1	2015	Amazing Spider-Man: Renew Your Vows (2015) #1-5, and other material	Omnibus	1,288	28 Jan 2025	Humberto Ramos X-Men DM cover: 978-1302959692
Symbiote Spider-Man by Peter David Omnibus	2019–2024	Symbiote Spider-Man (2019) #1-5; Symbiote Spider-Man: Alien Reality #1-5; Symbiote Spider-Man: King In Black #1-5; Symbiote Spider-Man: Crossroads #1-5; Symbiote Spider-Man 2099 (2024) #1-5	Omnibus	632	12 Aug 2025	Greg Land cover: 978-1302961947
Symbiote Spider-Man by Peter David Omnibus	2019–2024	Symbiote Spider-Man (2019) #1-5; Symbiote Spider-Man: Alien Reality #1-5; Symbiote Spider-Man: King In Black #1-5; Symbiote Spider-Man: Crossroads #1-5; Symbiote Spider-Man 2099 (2024) #1-5	Omnibus	632	12 Aug 2025	Nick Bradshaw DM cover: 978-1302961954

== Other versions of Spider-Man ==
=== Marvel Adventures Spider-Man ===
Marvel pitched Marvel Age Spider-Man and Marvel Adventures Spider-Man as: "The perfect line to introduce new readers to the Marvel Universe. Marvel Adventures books harken back to the classic tales of the Marvel Universe - free from years of continuity - and fuses them with an unmistakably modern style and wit."

Twenty issues came out under the Marvel Age title before it was retitled Marvel Adventures. Collected books were released in a smaller digest format.

==== Volume 1 (2004–2010) ====
#	Title	Material collected	Format	Pages	Released	ISBN
Marvel Age Spider-Man
1	Fearsome Foes	Marvel Age Spider-Man #1–4	Digest	96	Jun 2004	978-0785114390
2	Everyday Hero	Marvel Age Spider-Man #5–8	Digest	96	Aug 2004	978-0785114512
3	Swingtime	Marvel Age Spider-Man #9–12	Digest	96	Sep 2004	978-0785115489
4	The Goblin Strikes Back	Marvel Age Spider-Man #13–16	Digest	96	Nov 2004	978-0785115496
5	Spidey Strikes Back	Marvel Age Spider-Man #17–20	Digest	96	Mar 2005	978-0785116325
	Marvel Age Spider-Man Team-Up: A Little Help From My Friends	Marvel Age Spider-Man Team-Up #1–5	Digest	96	Jun 2005	978-0785116110
Marvel Adventures Spider-Man
1	The Sinister Six	Marvel Adventures Spider-Man #1–4	Digest	96	Sep 2005	978-0785117391
2	Power Struggle	Marvel Adventures Spider-Man #5–8	Digest	96	Jan 2006	978-0785119036
4	Concrete Jungle	Marvel Adventures Spider-Man #13–16	Digest	96	Sep 2006	978-0785120056
5	Monsters on the Prowl	Marvel Adventures Spider-Man #17–20	Digest	96	Jan 2007	978-0785123095
6	The Black Costume	Marvel Adventures Spider-Man #21–24	Digest	96	May 2007	978-0785123101
7	Secret Identity	Marvel Adventures Spider-Man #25–28	Digest	96	Sep 2007	978-0785123859
8	Forces of Nature	Marvel Adventures Spider-Man #29–32	Digest	96	Jan 2008	978-0785125259
9	Fiercest Foes	Marvel Adventures Spider-Man #33–36	Digest	96	Apr 2008	978-0785125266
10	Identity Crisis	Marvel Adventures Spider-Man #37–40	Digest	96	Sep 2008	978-0785128694
11	Animal Instinct	Marvel Adventures Spider-Man #41–44	Digest	96	Jan 2009	978-0785128700
12	Jumping to Conclusions	Marvel Adventures Spider-Man #45–48	Digest	96	May 2009	978-0785128717
13	Animal Attack!	Marvel Adventures Spider-Man #49–52	Digest	96	Aug 2009	978-0785136392
14	Thwip!	Marvel Adventures Spider-Man #53–56	Digest	96	Dec 2009	978-0785136408
15	Peter Parker vs. the X-Men	Marvel Adventures Spider-Man #57–60	Digest	96	Apr 2010	978-0785141167
Oversized Hardcover
1	Marvel Adventures Spider-Man Vol. 1	Marvel Adventures Spider-Man #1–8	OHC	192	Oct 2006	978-0785124320

==== Volume 2 (2010–2012) ====
#	Title	Material collected	Format	Pages	Released	ISBN
1	Amazing	Marvel Adventures Spider-Man (vol. 2) #1–4	Digest	96	Oct 2010	978-0785141181
2	Spectacular	Marvel Adventures Spider-Man (vol. 2) #5–8	Digest	96	Feb 2011	978-0785145608
3	Sensational	Marvel Adventures Spider-Man (vol. 2) #9–12	Digest	96	May 2011	978-0785147404

=== Miles Morales: Spider-Man ===
Miles Morales is a half-Black, half-Hispanic teenager and was created by Brian Michael Bendis. The character first appeared in Ultimate Comics: Fallout #4.

Bendis told USA Today that he was inspired in part by Donald Glover's appearance in the TV series Community dressed as Spider-Man. Bendis said: "[Glover] looked fantastic! I saw him in the costume and thought, 'I would like to read that book.' So I was glad I was writing that book."

==== Omnibuses ====
#	Title	Years covered	Issues collected	Pages	Publication date	ISBN
1	Miles Morales: Ultimate Spider-Man Omnibus	2011–2015	Ultimate Comics Spider-Man #1–28, #16.1; Spider-Men #1–5; Cataclysm: Ultimate Spider-Man #1–3; Ultimate Spider-Man #200; Miles Morales: Ultimate Spider-Man #1–12; material from Ultimate Fallout #4	1,168	19 Jun 2018	Kaare Andrews cover: 978-1302925109
1	Miles Morales: Ultimate Spider-Man Omnibus	2011–2015	Ultimate Comics Spider-Man #1–28, #16.1; Spider-Men #1–5; Cataclysm: Ultimate Spider-Man #1–3; Ultimate Spider-Man #200; Miles Morales: Ultimate Spider-Man #1–12; material from Ultimate Fallout #4	1,168	8 Jul 2020	Kaare Andrews cover: 978-1302925109
1	Miles Morales: Ultimate Spider-Man Omnibus	2011–2015	Ultimate Comics Spider-Man #1–28, #16.1; Spider-Men #1–5; Cataclysm: Ultimate Spider-Man #1–3; Ultimate Spider-Man #200; Miles Morales: Ultimate Spider-Man #1–12; material from Ultimate Fallout #4	1,168	1 Nov 2022	Kaare Andrews cover: 978-1302945718
1	Miles Morales: Ultimate Spider-Man Omnibus	2011–2015	Ultimate Comics Spider-Man #1–28, #16.1; Spider-Men #1–5; Cataclysm: Ultimate Spider-Man #1–3; Ultimate Spider-Man #200; Miles Morales: Ultimate Spider-Man #1–12; material from Ultimate Fallout #4	1,168	1 Nov 2022	Sara Pichelli Venom DM cover: 978-1302945725
2	Spider-Man: Miles Morales Omnibus	2016–2018	Spider-Man (vol. 2) #1–21, Spider-Gwen (vol. 2) #16–18, Spider-Men II #1–5, Spider-Man (vol. 2) #234–240	832	25 Feb 2020	978-1302922887
2	Spider-Man: Miles Morales Omnibus	2016–2018	Spider-Man (vol. 2) #1–21, Spider-Gwen (vol. 2) #16–18, Spider-Men II #1–5, Spider-Man (vol. 2) #234–240	856	20 Dec 2022	Sara Pichelli cover: 978-1302945732
2	Spider-Man: Miles Morales Omnibus	2016–2018	Spider-Man (vol. 2) #1–21, Spider-Gwen (vol. 2) #16–18, Spider-Men II #1–5, Spider-Man (vol. 2) #234–240	856	20 Dec 2022	Patrick Brown DM cover: 978-1302945749
3	Miles Morales: Spider-Man by Saladin Ahmed Omnibus	2018–2022	Miles Morales: Spider-Man (2018) #1–42, Absolute Carnage: Miles Morales #1–3, Amazing Spider-Man (vol. 5) #81 and Miles Morales: The End, material from Free Comic Book Day 2019 (Spider-Man/Venom) #1, Incoming! #1, Amazing Spider-Man (vol. 6) #49 and Miles Morales: Spider-Man Annual #1	1,160	22 Aug 2023	Ernanda Souza cover: 978-1302950781
3	Miles Morales: Spider-Man by Saladin Ahmed Omnibus	2018–2022	Miles Morales: Spider-Man (2018) #1–42, Absolute Carnage: Miles Morales #1–3, Amazing Spider-Man (vol. 5) #81 and Miles Morales: The End, material from Free Comic Book Day 2019 (Spider-Man/Venom) #1, Incoming! #1, Amazing Spider-Man (vol. 6) #49 and Miles Morales: Spider-Man Annual #1	1,160	22 Aug 2023	Taurin Clarke DM cover: 978-1302950798

==== Ultimate Collections ====
#	Title	Years covered	Issues collected	Pages	Publication date	ISBN
1	Miles Morales: Ultimate Spider-Man Ultimate Collection Book 1	2011–2012	Ultimate Fallout #4; Ultimate Comics: Spider-Man #1–12; Spider-Men #1–5	400	28 Jul 2015	978-0785197782
2	Miles Morales: Ultimate Spider-Man Ultimate Collection Book 2	2012–2013	Ultimate Comics: Spider-Man #13–28, 16.1	384	22 Oct 2015	978-0785197799
3	Miles Morales: Ultimate Spider-Man Ultimate Collection Book 3	2013–2015	Cataclysm: Ultimate Comics Spider-Man #1–3; Ultimate Spider-Man #200; Miles Morales: The Ultimate Spider-Man #1–12	360	8 Dec 2015	978-0785197805

==== Modern Era Epic Collections ====
#	Title	Years covered	Issues collected	Pages	Publication date	ISBN
1	Hero In Training	2011–2012	Ultimate Comics Spider-Man (2011) #1-12; Spider-Men (2012) #1-5; material from Ultimate Fallout (2011) #4	400	11 Mar 2025	978-1302961053
2	Spider-Man No More	2012–2013	Ultimate Comics Spider-Man (2011) #13-28, 16.1	384	26 Aug 2025	978-1302961060
3	Revivals And Revelations	2013-2015	Cataclysm: Ultimate Spider-Man (2013) #1-3; Ultimate Spider-Man #200; Miles Morales: Ultimate Spider-Man #1-12	368	27 Jan 2026	978-1302961077
4	Sitting In A Tree	2015-2016	Spider-Man (vol. 2) #1-14; Spider-Gwen (vol. 2) #16-18	392	25 Aug 2026	978-1302970024
5	Sinister Six Reborn	2016-2017	Spider-Man (vol. 2) #15-21, #234-240; Spider-Men II #1-5; Generations: Miles Morales Spider-Man & Peter Parker Spider-Man #1	464	27 Apr 2027	978-1302972080

==== “New reader” trade paperbacks ====
#	Title	Years covered	Issues collected	Pages	Publication date	ISBN
1	Miles Morales: Spider-Man	2011–2012	Ultimate Comics: Spider-Man #1–11	240	14 Jul 2019	978-1302918071
2	Miles Morales: With Great Power	2012–2013	Ultimate Comics Spider-Man #11–22, 16.1	296	11 Sep 2019	978-1302919771
3	Miles Morales: Great Responsibility	2013–2014	Ultimate Comics Spider-Man #23–28; Cataclysm: Ultimate Spider-Man #1–3; Ultimate Spider-Man #200	240	25 Feb 2020	978-1302921149
4	Miles Morales: Ultimate End	2014–2015	Miles Morales: Ultimate Spider-Man #1–12	248	6 Jul 2021	978-1302929831
5	Miles Morales: Marvel Universe	2016	Spider-Man (vol. 2) #1–11	248	15 Jun 2022	978-1302945060
6	Miles Morales: Avenging Avenger	2017	Spider-Man (vol. 2) #12–19; Spider-Gwen (vol. 2) #16–18	248	1 Feb 2023	978-1302949679

==== Ultimate Comics: Spider-Man (2011–2013) ====
#	Title	Material collected	Format	Pages	Released	ISBN
1	Who is Miles Morales?	Ultimate Comics: Fallout #4, Ultimate Comics: Spider-Man #1–5	HC	144	29 Feb 2012	978-0785157120
1	Who is Miles Morales?	Ultimate Comics: Fallout #4, Ultimate Comics: Spider-Man #1–5	TPB	136	14 Aug 2012	978-0785157137
2	Scorpion	Ultimate Comics: Spider-Man #6–10	HC	120	27 Jun 2012	978-0785157144
2	Scorpion	Ultimate Comics: Spider-Man #6–10	TPB	112	19 Dec 2012	978-0785157151
3	Divided We Fall, United We Stand	Ultimate Comics: Spider-Man #11–18	HC	184	12 Dec 2012	978-0785161752
3	Divided We Fall, United We Stand	Ultimate Comics: Spider-Man #11–18	TPB	184	21 May 2013	978-0785161769
4	Venom War	Ultimate Comics: Spider-Man #16.1, 19–22	HC	144	17 Jul 2013	978-0785165033
4	Venom War	Ultimate Comics: Spider-Man #16.1, 19–22	TPB	144	30 Apr 2014	978-0785165040
5	Spider-Man No More	Ultimate Comics: Spider-Man #23–28	HC	136	14 Feb 2014	978-0785168027
5	Spider-Man No More	Ultimate Comics: Spider-Man #23–28	TPB	136	30 Sep 2014	978-0785167068

==== Miles Morales: The Ultimate Spider-Man (2014–2015) ====
#	Title	Material collected	Format	Pages	Released	ISBN
1	Revival	Miles Morales: Ultimate Spider-Man #1–5, Ultimate Spider-Man #200	TPB	144	4 Nov 2014	978-0785154174
2	Revelations	Miles Morales: Ultimate Spider-Man #6–12	TPB	160	9 Jun 2015	978-0785154181

==== Spider-Man (vol. 2) (2016–2017) ====
Miles Morales' story was relaunched with a new number one in 2016, and the character established in Marvel's main 616 universe. Brian Michael Bendis continued as writer, with Sara Pichelli providing the art.

#	Title	Material collected	Format	Pages	Released	ISBN
1	Spider-Man: Miles Morales Vol. 1	Spider-Man (vol. 2) #1–5	TPB	120	7 Sep 2016	978-1846537165
2	Spider-Man: Miles Morales Vol. 2	Spider-Man (vol. 2) #6–11	TPB	136	28 Mar 2017	978-0785199625
	Spider-Man/Spider-Gwen: Sitting in a Tree	Spider-Man (vol. 2) #12–14; Spider-Gwen (vol. 2) #16–18	TPB	136	17 May 2017	978-1302907624
3	Spider-Man: Miles Morales Vol. 3	Spider-Man (vol. 2) #15–21	TPB	160	7 Nov 2017	978-1302905972
4	Spider-Man: Miles Morales Vol. 4	Spider-Man (vol. 2) #234–240	TPB	160	3 Jul 2018	978-1302905989

==== Miles Morales: Spider-Man (2018–2022) ====
Saladin Ahmed started writing the series from 2018.

#	Title	Material collected	Format	Pages	Released	ISBN
1	Straight Out Of Brooklyn	Miles Morales: Spider-Man #1–6	TPB	136	16 Jul 2019	978-1302914783
2	Bring On The Bad Guys	Miles Morales: Spider-Man #7–10; material from Free Comic Book Day 2019 (Spider-Man/Venom)	TPB	112	31 Dec 2020	978-1302914790
3	Family Business	Miles Morales: Spider-Man #11–15	TPB	112	21 Jul 2020	978-1302920166
4	Ultimatum	Miles Morales: Spider-Man #16–21	TPB	136	23 Feb 2021	978-1302920173
5	The Clone Saga	Miles Morales: Spider-Man #22–28	TPB	168	14 Sep 2021	978-1302926014
6	All Eyes On Me	Miles Morales: Spider-Man #29–32	TPB	112	18 Jan 2022	978-1302926021
7	Beyond	Miles Morales: Spider-Man #33–36; material from Annual #1	TPB	120	21 Jun 2022	978-1302932657
8	Empire Of The Spider	Miles Morales: Spider-Man #37–42	TPB	144	27 Dec 2022	978-1302933128

==== Miles Morales: Spider-Man (2022-2026) ====
Cody Ziglar was the new writer from December 2022.

#	Title	Material collected	Format	Pages	Released	ISBN
1	Trial By Spider	Miles Morales: Spider-Man #1–5	TPB	178	1 Aug 2023	978-1302948528
	Carnage Reigns	Carnage Reigns Alpha; Miles Morales: Spider-Man #6–7, Carnage #13–14, Red Goblin #5; Carnage Reigns Omega	TPB	200	26 Sep 2023	978-1302954222
2	Bad Blood	Miles Morales: Spider-Man #8–12	TPB	112	27 Feb 2024	978-1302948535
3	Gang War	Miles Morales: Spider-Man #13–16; Giant Size Spider-Man (2024)	TPB	112	13 Aug 2024	978-1302954697
4	Retribution	Miles Morales: Spider-Man #17–20; Web of Spider-Man (vol. 3) #1 (Miles Morales: Spider-Man story)	TPB	144	29 Oct 2024	978-1302954772
5	Blood Hunt	Miles Morales: Spider-Man #21–24, Annual (2024)	TPB	144	11 Feb 2025	978-1302958459
6	Webs Of Wakanda	Miles Morales: Spider-Man #25–30	TPB	112	13 May 2025	978-1302960858
	Miles Morales: Spider-Man / Deadpool - Pools Of Blood	Deadpool (vol. 10) #11-12; Miles Morales: Spider-Man #30-31	TPB	112	4 Nov 2025	978-1302964924
7	God War	Miles Morales: Spider-Man #32-36	TPB	112	2 Dec 2025	978-1302960865
8	Revenge Of Rabble	Miles Morales: Spider-Man #37-42	TPB	144	16 Jun 2026	978-1302963330

==== Miles Morales: Spider-Man (2026-present) ====
Bryan Hill replaced Cody Ziglar in 2026.

#	Title	Material collected	Format	Pages	Released	ISBN
1	TBC	Miles Morales: Spider-Man (2026) #1-5	TPB	184	4 May 2027	978-1302968960

==== Miniseries and one-shots ====
#	Title	Material collected	Format	Pages	Released	ISBN
	Cataclysm: The Ultimates' Last Stand	Cataclysm: Ultimate Spider-Man #1–3; Cataclysm: The Ultimates' Last Stand #1–5; Cataclysm: Ultimate X-Men #1–3; Cataclysm: Ultimates #1–3; Hunger #1–4; Cataclysm #0.1; Survive #1	HC	440	18 Mar 2014	978-0785189190
	Cataclysm: The Ultimates' Last Stand	Cataclysm: Ultimate Spider-Man #1–3; Cataclysm: The Ultimates' Last Stand #1–5; Cataclysm: Ultimate X-Men #1–3; Cataclysm: Ultimates #1–3; Hunger #1–4; Cataclysm #0.1; Survive #1	TPB	440	17 Feb 2015	978-0785189206
	Spider-Men	Spider-Men #1–5	HC	120	28 Nov 2012	978-0785165330
	Spider-Men	Spider-Men #1–5	TPB	120	17 Feb 2015	978-1846535208
	Spider-Men II	Spider-Men II #1–5	TPB	116	21 Mar 2018	978-1846538704
	Spider-Men: Worlds Collide	Spider-Men #1–5, Spider-Men II #1–5	TPB	240	30 Nov 2021	978-1302931971
	Absolute Carnage: Miles Morales	Absolute Carnage: Miles Morales #1–3; Absolute Carnage: Weapon Plus #1	TPB	112	28 Jan 2020	978-1302920142
	Spider-Verse: Spider-Zero	Spider-Verse (vol. 3) #1–6	TPB	136	28 Jul 2020	978-1302920265
	The End	Miles Morales: The End #1; Captain America: The End #1; Captain Marvel: The End #1; Deadpool: The End #1; Doctor Strange: The End #1; Venom: The End #1	TPB	200	25 Aug 2020	978-1302924997
	Infinite Destinies	Miles Morales: Spider-Man Annual #1; Iron Man Annual (vol. 3) #1; Captain America Annual (vol. 3) #1; Thor Annual (vol. 5) #1; Black Cat Annual (vol. 2) #1; Avengers Annual (vol. 5) #1; Guardians of the Galaxy Annual (vol. 4) #1; Amazing Spider-Man Annual (vol. 4) #2	TPB	264	16 Nov 2021	978-1302931506
	What If...? Miles Morales	What If...? Miles Morales #1–5	TPB	128	13 Sep 2022	978-1302946036

=== Spider-Man 2099 ===
Spider-Man 2099 is a superhero created by Peter David and Rick Leonardi in 1992 for the Marvel 2099 line. The character is a futuristic re-imagining of the original Spider-Man, whose secret identity is Miguel O'Hara.

==== Volume 1 (1992-1996) ====
#	Title	Material collected	Format	Pages	Released	ISBN
1	Spider-Man 2099 Vol. 1	Spider-Man 2099 #1–10	TPB	240	6 May 2009	978-0785139645
2	Spider-Man 2099 Vol. 2	Spider-Man 2099 #11–14, Annual #1; material from 2099 Unlimited #1–3	TPB	240	8 Oct 2013	978-0785185376
3	Spider-Man 2099 Vol. 3	Spider-Man 2099 #15–22; Ravage 2099 #15; X-Men 2099 #5; Doom 2099 #14; Punisher 2099 #13	TPB	296	17 Feb 2015	978-0785193029
4	Spider-Man 2099 Vol. 4	Spider-Man 2099 #23–33; material from 2099 Unlimited #8	TPB	286	2 May 2017	978-1302904746
	Spider-Man 2099 vs. Venom 2099	Spider-Man 2099 #34–38; Spider-Man 2099 Special; Spider-Man 2099 Meets Spider-Man; material from 2099 Unlimited #9–10	TPB	280	30 Apr 2019	978-1302916213
Omnibus
1	Spider-Man 2099 Omnibus Vol. 1	Spider-Man 2099 #1–46, Annual #1, Special; Ravage 2099 #15; X-Men 2099 #5; Doom 2099 #14; Punisher 2099 #13; Spider-Man 2099 Meets Spider-Man	Omnibus	1,384	25 Oct 2022	Jim Fern cover: 978-1302947798
1	Spider-Man 2099 Omnibus Vol. 1	Spider-Man 2099 #1–46, Annual #1, Special; Ravage 2099 #15; X-Men 2099 #5; Doom 2099 #14; Punisher 2099 #13; Spider-Man 2099 Meets Spider-Man	Omnibus	1,384	25 Oct 2022	Rick Leonardi DM cover: 978-1302947804

==== Volume 2 (2014–2015) ====
#	Title	Material collected	Format	Pages	Released	ISBN
1	Spider-Man 2099 Vol. 1: Out of Time	Spider-Man 2099 (vol. 2) #1–5; material from Amazing Spider-Man (vol. 3) #1	TPB	120	17 Feb 2015	978-0785190790
	Spider-Verse	Amazing Spider-Man (vol. 3) #7–15, Superior Spider-Man #32–33, Free Comic Book Day: Guardians of the Galaxy #1 (five-page Spider-Man story), Spider-Verse (vol. 2) #1–2, Spider-Verse Team-Up #1–3, Scarlet Spiders #1–3, Spider-Woman (vol. 5) #1–4, Spider-Man 2099 (vol. 2) #6–8	OHC	648	12 May 2015	978-0785190356
	Spider-Verse	Amazing Spider-Man (vol. 3) #7–15, Superior Spider-Man #32–33, Free Comic Book Day: Guardians of the Galaxy #1 (five-page Spider-Man story), Spider-Verse (vol. 2) #1–2, Spider-Verse Team-Up #1–3, Scarlet Spiders #1–3, Spider-Woman (vol. 5) #1–4, Spider-Man 2099 (vol. 2) #6–8	TPB	648	10 Mar 2016	978-0785190363
2	Spider-Man 2099 Vol. 2: Spider-Verse	Spider-Man 2099 (vol. 2) #6–12	TPB	160	28 Jul 2015	978-0785190806
	Spider-Man 2099 Omnibus	Spider-Man 2099 (vol. 2) #1–12	TPB Omnibus	264	1 Sep 2022	978-1804910399

==== Volume 3 (2015–2017) ====
Despite a new volume number, the trade paperback numbering continues from before.

#	Title	Material collected	Format	Pages	Released	ISBN
3	Spider-Man 2099 Vol. 3: Smack to the Future	Spider-Man 2099 (vol. 3) #1–5, material from Amazing Spider-Man (vol. 4) #1	TPB	120	10 May 2016	978-0785199632
4	Spider-Man 2099 Vol. 4: Gods and Women	Spider-Man 2099 (vol. 3) #6–10	TPB	112	9 Aug 2016	978-0785199649
5	Spider-Man 2099 Vol. 5: Civil War II	Spider-Man 2099 (vol. 3) #11–16	TPB	136	31 Jan 2017	978-1302902810
6	Spider-Man 2099 Vol. 6: Apocalypse Soon	Spider-Man 2099 (vol. 3) #17–21	TPB	112	12 Sep 2017	978-1302902827
7	Spider-Man 2099 Vol. 7: Back to the Future, Shock!	Spider-Man 2099 (vol. 3) #22–25, Spider-Man 2099 Meets Spider-Man	TPB	112	10 Oct 2017	978-1302905200
Omnibus
2	Spider-Man 2099 Omnibus Vol. 2	Spider-Man 2099 (vol. 2) #1-12; Spider-Man 2099 (vol. 3) #1-25; Captain Marvel (1999) #27-30; Superior Spider-Man #17-19; Secret Wars 2099 #1-5; material from 2099 Unlimited (1993) #1-3, 8-10; Amazing Spider-Man (vol. 3) #1; Amazing Spider-Man (vol. 4) #1	Omnibus	1,256	2 Apr 2024	Simon Bianchi cover: 978-1302953836
2	Spider-Man 2099 Omnibus Vol. 2	Spider-Man 2099 (vol. 2) #1-12; Spider-Man 2099 (vol. 3) #1-25; Captain Marvel (1999) #27-30; Superior Spider-Man #17-19; Secret Wars 2099 #1-5; material from 2099 Unlimited (1993) #1-3, 8-10; Amazing Spider-Man (vol. 3) #1; Amazing Spider-Man (vol. 4) #1	Omnibus	1,256	2 Apr 2024	Pasqual Ferry DM cover: 978-1302953843

==== Miniseries ====
#	Title	Material collected	Format	Pages	Released	ISBN
	Timestorm 2009/2099	Timestorm 2009/2099: Spider-Man, Timestorm 2009/2099 #1–4, Timestorm 2009/2099: X-Men	HC	144	18 Nov 2009	978-0785139225
	Amazing Spider-Man 2099 Companion	Spider-Man 2099 (vol. 4) #1, 2099 Alpha #1, Conan 2099 #1, Doom 2099 (vol. 2) #1, Fantastic Four 2099 (vol. 2) #1, Ghost Rider 2099 (vol. 2) #1, The Punisher 2099 (vol. 3) #1, Venom 2099 #1, 2099 Omega #1	TPB	296	4 Aug 2020	978-1302924928
	Spider-Man 2099: Exodus	Spider-Man 2099: Alpha #1, Spider-Man 2099: Omega #1, Spider-Man 2099: Exodus #1-5	TPB	180	3 Jan 2023	978-1804910825
	Spider-Man 2099: Dark Genesis	Spider-Man 2099: Dark Genesis #1–5	TPB	112	5 Sep 2023	978-1302952235
	Miguel O'Hara - Spider-Man: 2099	Miguel O'Hara - Spider-Man: 2099 #1–5	TPB	120	23 Jul 2023	978-1302958022
	Symbiote Spider-Man 2099	Symbiote Spider-Man 2099 #1–5	TPB	120	7 Jan 2025	978-1302949969

=== Spider-Man Loves Mary Jane ===
In this "romantic-comedy manga", a youthful Mary Jane navigates high school in a world dominated by Spider-Man and his supervillains. Sean McKeever wrote the first two Mary Jane miniseries, as well as all 20 issues of Spider-Man Loves Mary Jane.

#	Title	Material collected	Format	Pages	Released	ISBN
1	Circle of Friends	Mary Jane #1–4	Digest	96	17 Nov 2004	978-0785114673
2	Homecoming	Mary Jane: Homecoming #1–4	Digest	96	19 Oct 2005	978-0785117797
1	Super Crush	Spider-Man Loves Mary Jane #1–5	Digest	120	26 Jul 2006	978-0785119548
2	The New Girl	Spider-Man Loves Mary Jane #6–10	Digest	120	10 Jan 2007	978-0785122654
3	My Secret Life	Spider-Man Loves Mary Jane #11–15	Digest	120	6 Jun 2007	978-0785122661
4	Still Friends	Spider-Man Loves Mary Jane #16–20	Digest	120	17 Oct 2007	978-0785125648
	Sophomore Jinx	Spider-Man Loves Mary Jane Season 2 #1–5	HC	120	1 Apr 2009	Bookstore cover: 978-0785130048
	Sophomore Jinx	Spider-Man Loves Mary Jane Season 2 #1–5	HC	120	1 Apr 2009	Direct Market cover: 978-0785139607
1	The Real Thing	Mary Jane #1–4; Mary Jane: Homecoming #1-4; Spider-Man Loves Mary Jane #1–3	Digest	272	25 Jun 2019	978-1302918736
2	The Unexpected Thing	Spider-Man Loves Mary Jane #4–13	Digest	256	22 Oct 2019	978-1302919788
3	The Secret Thing	Spider-Man Loves Mary Jane #14–20; Spider-Man Loves Mary Jane Season 2 (2008) #1–5	Digest	288	13 Oct 2020	978-1302925376
Oversized Hardcovers
1	Spider-Man Loves Mary Jane Vol. 1	Mary Jane #1–4; Mary Jane: Homecoming #1–4; Spider-Man Loves Mary Jane (2005) #1–5	OHC	320	11 Apr 2007	978-0785126102
2	Spider-Man Loves Mary Jane Vol. 2	Spider-Man Loves Mary Jane (2005) #6–20	OHC	368	3 Sep 2008	978-0785130833

=== Spider-Man: Noir ===
The Noir version of Spider-Man exists on Earth-90214, with the character emerging from the United States' Great Depression 1930s era.

#	Title	Material collected	Format	Pages	Released	ISBN
Spider-Man: Noir	2008	Spider-Man Noir #1–4	HC	112	10 Jun 2009	978-0785139447
Spider-Man: Noir	2008	Spider-Man Noir #1–4	TPB	112	23 Sep 2009	978-0785129233
Spider-Man: Noir – The Complete Collection	2008	Spider-Man Noir #1–4; Spider-Man Noir: Eyes Without A Face #1–4; Edge of Spider-Verse; Spider-Geddon: Spider-Man Noir Video Comic; material from Spider-Verse Team-Up	TPB	264	28 May 2019	978-1302919580
Spider-Man: Noir – The Complete Collection	2008	Spider-Man Noir #1–4; Spider-Man Noir: Eyes Without A Face #1–4; Edge of Spider-Verse; Spider-Geddon: Spider-Man Noir Video Comic; material from Spider-Verse Team-Up	TPB	264	22 Jul 2025	978-1302962876
Spider-Man Noir: Eyes Without A Face	2010	Spider-Man Noir: Eyes Without A Face #1–4	HC	112	15 Jun 2010	978-0785144441
Spider-Man Noir: Eyes Without A Face	2010	Spider-Man Noir: Eyes Without A Face #1–4	TPB	112	15 Dec 2010	978-0785144502
Spider-Man Noir: Twilight In Babylon	2020	Spider-Man Noir (vol. 2) #1–5	TPB	112	12 Jan 2021	978-1302924379
Spider-Man: Noir - The Gwen Stacy Affair	2025	Spider-Man Noir [2025] #1–5	TPB	120	2 Jun 2026	978-1302967178

=== Spider-Man: Renew Your Vows ===
During the Secret Wars event, an alternate New York City included Peter Parker who was married to Mary-Jane, with a superpowered daughter, Annie. Under the monikers of Spider-Man, Spinneret and Spiderling, the trio fight crime together.

#	Title	Material collected	Format	Pages	Released	ISBN
	Amazing Spider-Man: Renew Your Vows	Amazing Spider-Man: Renew Your Vows (vol. 1) #1–5; Secret Wars: Secret Love #1	TPB	136	16 Dec 2015	978-0785198864
1	Brawl In The Family	Amazing Spider-Man: Renew Your Vows (vol. 2) #1–5	TPB	120	14 Jun 2017	978-1302905804
2	The Venom Experiment	Amazing Spider-Man: Renew Your Vows (vol. 2) #6–10	TPB	112	29 Nov 2017	978-1302905811
3	Eight Years Later	Amazing Spider-Man: Renew Your Vows (vol. 2) #13–18	TPB	136	30 May 2018	978-1302905828
4	Are You Okay, Annie?	Amazing Spider-Man: Renew Your Vows (vol. 2) #19–23	TPB	136	21 Nov 2018	978-1302910617

=== Ultimate Spider-Man (2000) ===
Launched in 2000, Ultimate Spider-Man offered a "new and modern version of Peter Parker, a young and inexperienced Spider-Man". "In the throes of bankruptcy, Marvel needed a hit, and "Ultimate Spider-Man" was just that hit."

In 2011, writer Brian Michael Bendis told Comic Book Resources: "The Ultimate Universe was originally supposed to be this ground-level look at Marvel characters. We did that."

#	Title	Material collected	Format	Pages	Released	ISBN
1	Power And Responsibility	Ultimate Spider-Man #1–7	HC	200	8 Apr 2009	978-0785139393
1	Power And Responsibility	Ultimate Spider-Man #1–7	TPB	184	2001	978-0785107866
2	Learning Curve	Ultimate Spider-Man #8–13	TPB	144	2002	978-0785111443
3	Double Trouble	Ultimate Spider-Man #14–21	TPB	176	2002	978-0785108795
4	Legacy	Ultimate Spider-Man #22–27	TPB	160	Dec 2002	978-0785109686
5	Public Scrutiny	Ultimate Spider-Man #28–32	TPB	128	Feb 2003	978-0785110873
6	Venom	Ultimate Spider-Man #33–39	HC	176	2 Jan 2008	978-0785128731
6	Venom	Ultimate Spider-Man #33–39	TPB	168	Aug 2003	978-0785110941
7	Irresponsible	Ultimate Spider-Man #40–45	TPB	144	Nov 2003	978-0785110927
8	Cats & Kings	Ultimate Spider-Man #46–53	TPB	184	May 2004	978-0785112501
9	Ultimate Six	Ultimate Spider-Man #46; Ultimate Six #1–7	TPB	208	Jun 2004	978-0785113126
10	Hollywood	Ultimate Spider-Man #54–59	TPB	144	Jul 2004	978-0785114024
11	Carnage	Ultimate Spider-Man #60–65	TPB	144	17 Nov 2004	978-0785114031
12	Superstars	Ultimate Spider-Man #66–71	TPB	144	6 Apr 2004	978-0785116295
13	Hobgoblin	Ultimate Spider-Man #72–78	TPB	168	10 Aug 2005	978-0785116479
14	Warriors	Ultimate Spider-Man #79–85	TPB	144	11 Jan 2006	978-0785116806
15	Silver Sable	Ultimate Spider-Man #86–90, Annual #1	TPB	160	24 May 2006	978-0785116813
16	Deadpool	Ultimate Spider-Man #91–96, Annual #2	TPB	184	13 Sep 2006	978-0785119272
17	Clone Saga	Ultimate Spider-Man #97–105	HC	288	18 Apr 2007	978-0785126775
17	Clone Saga	Ultimate Spider-Man #97–105	TPB	240	5 Sep 2007	978-0785119289
18	Ultimate Knights	Ultimate Spider-Man #106–111	TPB	144	12 Sep 2007	978-0785121367
19	Death Of A Goblin	Ultimate Spider-Man #112–117	TPB	144	20 Feb 2008	978-0785121374
20	And His Amazing Friends	Ultimate Spider-Man #118–122	TPB	120	3 Sep 2008	978-0785129615
21	War Of The Symbiotes	Ultimate Spider-Man #123–128	TPB	144	11 Feb 2009	978-0785129622
22	Ultimatum	Ultimate Spider-Man #129–133, Annual #3	HC	160	23 Sep 2009	978-0785141242
22	Ultimatum	Ultimate Spider-Man #129–133, Annual #3	TPB	160	27 Jan 2010	978-0785138457
	Ultimatum: Requiem	Ultimatum: Spider-Man – Requiem #1–2	HC	144	14 Oct 2009	978-0785139256
	Ultimatum: Requiem	Ultimatum: Spider-Man – Requiem #1–2	TPB	152	3 Feb 2010	978-0785139256
1	The World According To Peter Parker	Ultimate Spider-Man (vol. 2) #1–6	HC	144	7 Apr 2010	978-0785140115
1	The World According To Peter Parker	Ultimate Spider-Man (vol. 2) #1–6	TPB	144	21 Jul 2010	978-0785140993
2	Chameleons	Ultimate Spider-Man (vol. 2) #7–14	HC	192	29 Sep 2010	978-0785140122
2	Chameleons	Ultimate Spider-Man (vol. 2) #7–14	TPB	192	18 Mar 2011	978-0785141006
3	Death Of Spider-Man Prelude	Ultimate Spider-Man (vol. 2) #15, #150–155	HC	168	6 Jul 2011	978-0785146391
3	Death Of Spider-Man Prelude	Ultimate Spider-Man (vol. 2) #15, #150–155	TPB	168	4 Jan 2012	978-0785146407
4	Death Of Spider-Man	Ultimate Spider-Man #156–160	HC	128	2 Nov 2011	978-0785152743
4	Death Of Spider-Man	Ultimate Spider-Man #156–160	TPB	128	2 May 2012	978-0785152750
	Death Of Spider-Man Fallout	Ultimate Comics: Fallout #1–6	HC	136	7 Dec 2011	978-0785159124
	Death Of Spider-Man Fallout	Ultimate Comics: Fallout #1–6	TPB	136	6 Jun 2012	978-0785159131

Ultimate Collections
#	Title	Years covered	Issues collected	Pages	Released	ISBN
1	Volume 1	2000–2001	Ultimate Spider-Man #1–13	352	Apr 2007	978-0785124924
2	Volume 2	2001–2002	Ultimate Spider-Man #14–27	344	Apr 2009	978-0785128861
3	Volume 3	2002–2003	Ultimate Spider-Man #½, 28–39	296	Aug 2010	978-0785149194
4	Volume 4	2003–2004	Ultimate Spider-Man #40–45, 47–53	328	Aug 2013	978-0785184379
5	Volume 5	2003–2004	Ultimate Spider-Man #46, 54–59, Ultimate Six #1–7	352	Feb 2015	978-0785192893
6	Volume 6	2004–2005	Ultimate Spider-Man #60–71	296	Apr 2016	978-0785196327
7	Volume 7	2005–2006	Ultimate Spider-Man #72–85	344	Jun 2017	978-1302908744

Ultimate Epic Collections
#	Title	Years covered	Issues collected	Pages	Released	ISBN
1	Learning Curve	2000–2001	Ultimate Spider-Man #1–13	352	18 Mar 2025	978-1302963002
2	Hunted	2001-2002	Ultimate Spider-Man #14-27	344	17 Mar 2026	978-1302967949
3	Venom	2002-2003	Ultimate Spider-Man #28-39, ½	296	16 Mar 2027	978-1302970918

Oversized hardcovers
#	Years covered	Material collected	Format	Pages	Released	ISBN
1	2000–2001	Ultimate Spider-Man #1–13	OHC	354	20 Mar 2002	978-0785108986
2	2001–2002	Ultimate Spider-Man #14–27	OHC	336	10 Mar 2003	978-0785110613
3	2002–2003	Ultimate Spider-Man #28–39, ½	OHC	304	29 Sep 2003	978-0785111566
4	2003–2004	Ultimate Spider-Man #40–45, 47–53	OHC	336	1 Jul 2004	978-0785112495
5	2003–2004	Ultimate Spider-Man #46, 54–59; Ultimate Six #1–7	OHC	352	24 Nov 2004	978-0785114017
6	2004–2005	Ultimate Spider-Man #60–71	OHC	296	5 Oct 2005	978-0785118411
7	2005–2006	Ultimate Spider-Man #72–85	OHC	344	18 Oct 2006	978-0785121480
8	2006	Ultimate Spider-Man #86–96, Annual #1–2	OHC	344	11 Apr 2007	978-0785126041
9	2006–2007	Ultimate Spider-Man #97–111	OHC	400	27 Feb 2008	978-0785130819
10	2007–2008	Ultimate Spider-Man #112–122	OHC	272	4 Mar 2009	978-0785137764
11	2008–2009	Ultimate Spider-Man #123–133, Annual #3; Ultimatum: Spider-Man – Requiem #1–2	OHC	384	22 Jun 2010	978-0785146421
12	2009–2010	Ultimate Spider-Man (vol. 2) #1–14	OHC	352	16 May 2012	978-0785164623
Barnes & Noble Collection	2000–2003	Ultimate Spider-Man #1–39, ½	OHC	992	2004	978-0760761335

Omnibuses
#	Title	Years covered	Material collected	Pages	Released	ISBN
1	Ultimate Spider-Man Vol. 1	2000–2003	Ultimate Spider-Man #1–39, ½	1,000	2 Jun 2012	Joe Quesada cover: 978-0785164753
1	Ultimate Spider-Man Vol. 1	2000–2003	Ultimate Spider-Man #1–39, ½	1,000	2 Jun 2012	Mark Bagley DM cover: 978-0785164982
1	Ultimate Spider-Man Vol. 1	2000–2003	Ultimate Spider-Man #1–39, ½	1,000	4 Jan 2022	Joe Quesada cover: 978-1302931872
1	Ultimate Spider-Man Vol. 1	2000–2003	Ultimate Spider-Man #1–39, ½	1,000	4 Jan 2022	Joe Quesada web DM cover: 978-1302931889
1	Ultimate Spider-Man Vol. 1	2000–2003	Ultimate Spider-Man #1–39, ½	1,000	4 Jan 2022	Mark Bagley Venom DM cover: 978-1302931865
2	Ultimate Spider-Man Vol. 2	2003–2005	Ultimate Spider-Man #40–71, Ultimate Six #1–7	984	17 Jan 2023	Mark Bagley cover: 978-1302947484
2	Ultimate Spider-Man Vol. 2	2003–2005	Ultimate Spider-Man #40–71, Ultimate Six #1–7	984	17 Jan 2023	Mark Bagley Carnage DM cover: 978-1302947484
2	Ultimate Spider-Man Vol. 2	2003–2005	Ultimate Spider-Man #40–71, Ultimate Six #1–7	984	17 Jan 2023	John Cassaday Sinister Six DM cover: 978-1302947491
3	Ultimate Spider-Man Vol. 3	2005–2007	Ultimate Spider-Man #72–111, Annual #1–2	1,088	6 Dec 2023	Mark Bagley cover: 978-1302950194
3	Ultimate Spider-Man Vol. 3	2005–2007	Ultimate Spider-Man #72–111, Annual #1–2	1,088	6 Dec 2023	Mark Bagley Carnage DM cover: 978-1302950323
3	Ultimate Spider-Man Vol. 3	2005–2007	Ultimate Spider-Man #72–111, Annual #1–2	1,088	6 Dec 2023	Mark Bagley Moon Knight DM cover: 978-1302950200
4	Ultimate Spider-Man Vol. 4	2007–2010	Ultimate Spider-Man #112–133, Annual #3, Ultimatum: Spider-Man – Requiem #1–2, Ultimate Spider-Man (vol. 2) #1–15	1,008	27 Aug 2024	Stuart Immonen cover: 978-1302959555
4	Ultimate Spider-Man Vol. 4	2007–2010	Ultimate Spider-Man #112–133, Annual #3, Ultimatum: Spider-Man – Requiem #1–2, Ultimate Spider-Man (vol. 2) #1–15	1,008	27 Aug 2024	Stuart Immonen X-Men DM cover: 978-1302959562
5	Ultimate Spider-Man Vol. 5	2010–2011; 2001–2002	Ultimate Spider-Man (vol. 2) #150–160; Ultimate Comics Fallout #1; Ultimate Marvel Team-Up #1-16; Ultimate Spider-Man Super Special; material from Ultimate Comics Fallout #2, 4, 6	856	18 Nov 2025	David LaFuente cover: 978-1302965464
5	Ultimate Spider-Man Vol. 5	2010–2011; 2001–2002	Ultimate Spider-Man (vol. 2) #150–160; Ultimate Comics Fallout #1; Ultimate Marvel Team-Up #1-16; Ultimate Spider-Man Super Special; material from Ultimate Comics Fallout #2, 4, 6	856	18 Nov 2025	Mark Bagley DM cover: 978-1302965471
5 (Alt)	Ultimate Comics Spider-Man: Death Of Spider-Man	2010–2011	Ultimate Spider-Man (vol. 2) #15, 150–160; Ultimate Avengers vs. New Ultimates #1–6; Ultimate Comics Fallout #1–6	608	28 Nov 2012	Joe Quesada cover: 978-0785164647
5 (Alt)	Ultimate Comics Spider-Man: Death Of Spider-Man	2010–2011	Ultimate Spider-Man (vol. 2) #15, 150–160; Ultimate Avengers vs. New Ultimates #1–6; Ultimate Comics Fallout #1–6	608	27 Feb 2024	Joe Quesada cover: 978-1302957551
5 (Alt)	Ultimate Comics Spider-Man: Death Of Spider-Man	2010–2011	Ultimate Spider-Man (vol. 2) #15, 150–160; Ultimate Avengers vs. New Ultimates #1–6; Ultimate Comics Fallout #1–6	608	27 Feb 2024	Mark Bagley Sinister Six DM cover: 978-1302957568

=== Ultimate Spider-Man (2024) ===
Launching in January 2024 and written by Jonathan Hickman, "Ultimate Spider-Man introduces a Peter Parker unlike any seen before, being in his thirties with a wife and kids, and facing different concerns."

#	Title	Material collected	Format	Pages	Released	ISBN
1	Married With Children	Ultimate Spider-Man (2024) #1–6	TPB	168	10 Sep 2024	978-1302957292
2	The Paper	Ultimate Spider-Man (2024) #7–12	TPB	136	18 Mar 2025	978-1302958282
3	Family Business	Ultimate Spider-Man (2024) #13–18	TPB	136	23 Sep 2025	978-1302958299
4	One Last Day	Ultimate Spider-Man (2024) #19–24	TPB	136	24 Mar 2026	978-1302958305
	Ultimate Incursion: Spider-Man	Ultimate Incursion: Spider-Man (2025) #1–5; FCBD 2025: Ultimate Universe	TPB	128	17 Feb 2026	978-1302964818
1	Ultimate Spider-Man: Fix The World Year One	Ultimate Spider-Man (2024) #1–12	Compact	320	13 Apr 2027	978-1302971670

=== Alternate continuity miniseries ===
Title	Years covered	Material collected	Format	Pages	Released	ISBN
Spider-Man: Chapter One	1998-1999	Spider-Man: Chapter One #0–12	TPB	328	4 Jan 2012	978-0785158486
Legend Of The Spider-Clan	2002	Spider-Man: Legend of the Spider-Clan #1–5; Spider-Man Family Featuring Spider-Clan	TPB	168	3 Jun 2025	978-1302964641
Trouble	2002–2003	Trouble #1–5	HC	168	2011	978-0785150862
Spider-Man: India	2005	Spider-Man: India #1–4	TPB	108	1 Jun 2023	978-1804911334
Spider-Man and Power Pack: Big-City Super Heroes	2007	Spider-Man and Power Pack #1–4	Digest	96	2007	978-0785123576
Spider-Man: Reign	2007	Spider-Man: Reign #1–4	HC	160	18 Apr 2007	978-0785117179
Spider-Man: Reign	2007	Spider-Man: Reign #1–4	TPB	160	2 Apr 2008	978-0785126652
Spider-Man: Reign	2007	Spider-Man: Reign #1–4	TPB	160	4 Jun 2024	978-1302958152
Spider-Man Fairy Tales	2007	Spider-Man Fairy Tales #1–4	TPB	104	12 Dec 2007	978-0785127659
Edge of Spider-Verse	2015	Edge of Spider-Verse #1–5	TPB	112	12 Mar 2015	978-0785197287
Spider-Man: Life Story	2019	Spider-Man: Life Story #1–6, Annual (2021)	HC	240	5 Nov 2019	978-1302931919
Spider-Man: Life Story	2019	Spider-Man: Life Story #1–6, Annual (2021)	TPB	240	2 May 2023	978-1302950019
Spider-Man: Life Story	2019	Spider-Man: Life Story #1–6	TPB	208	22 Oct 2019	978-1302917333
Spider-Man & Venom: Double Trouble	2020	Spider-Man & Venom: Double Trouble #1–4	TPB	112	2 Jun 2020	978-1302920395
Spider-Verse: Spider-Zero	2020	Spider-Verse (vol. 3) #1–6	TPB	136	28 Jul 2020	978-1302920265
Edge of Spider-Verse	2022	Edge of Spider-Verse (vol. 2) #1–5	TPB	168	14 Feb 2023	978-1302947170
Spider-Punk: Battle of the Banned	2022	Spider-Punk #1–5	TPB	168	21 Mar 2023	978-1302934620
Peter Parker & Miles Morales Spider-Men: Double Trouble	2023	Peter Parker & Miles Morales Spider-Men: Double Trouble #1–4, Spider-Man & Venom: Double Trouble #1	TPB	112	23 May 2023	978-1302931476
Uncanny Spider-Man: Fall of X	2023	Uncanny Spider-Man #1–5	TPB	184	18 Jun 2024	978-1302952266
Spider-Punk: Arms Race	2024	Spider-Punk: Arms Race #1–4	TPB	112	3 Sep 2024	978-1302958084
Edge of Spider-Verse: Spider Society	2024	Edge of Spider-Verse (vol. 3) #1–4	TPB	120	14 Oct 2024	978-1302957506
Your Friendly Neighborhood Spider-Man	2024–2025	Your Friendly Neighborhood Spider-Man #1–5	TPB	112	26 Aug 2025	978-1302961466
Spider-Verse Vs. Venomverse	2025	Spider-Verse Vs. Venomverse #1–5; Web of Spider-Verse, Web of Venomverse	TPB	176	13 Jan 2026	978-1302961558
Spider-Man '94	2025	Spider-Man '94 #1-5	TPB	120	5 May 2026	978-1302962098
Omnibuses
Spider-Man by John Byrne Omnibus	1998-1999	Spider-Man: Chapter One #0–12, and other material	Omnibus	1,274	3 Sep 2019	978-1302919528
Spider-Man by Chip Zdarsky Omnibus	2017–2021	Spider-Man: Life Story #1–6, Annual (2021); Spider-Man: Spider's Shadow #1–5, and other material	Omnibus	928	12 Dec 2023	Adam Kubert cover: 978-1302952983
Spider-Man by Chip Zdarsky Omnibus	2017–2021	Spider-Man: Life Story #1–6, Annual (2021); Spider-Man: Spider's Shadow #1–5, and other material	Omnibus	928	12 Dec 2023	Paulo Siqueira DM cover: 978-1302952990
Spider-Man by Chip Zdarsky Omnibus	2017–2021	Spider-Man: Life Story #1–6, Annual (2021); Spider-Man: Spider's Shadow #1–5, and other material	Omnibus	928	12 Dec 2023	Chip Zdarsky DM cover: 978-1302955922

== See also ==
- List of Spider-Man storylines
- Daredevil collected editions
- Marvel Omnibus
- Marvel oversized hardcovers
- Marvel Gallery Editions
- Marvel Epic Collection
- Marvel Premier Collection
- Marvel Complete Collections
- Marvel Masterworks
- Essential Marvel
