= Marvel oversized hardcover =

Marvel comics reprint collection

The Marvel Comics oversized hardcover format launched in 2002, reproducing full-colour comics in books approximately 11in x 7.5in in size. This was roughly an inch taller and wider than the original comic book.

== Launch ==
The first two releases were Ultimate Spider-Man Vol. 1 and The Complete Frank Miller Spider-Man in late-March and early-April 2002, with then Marvel President, Bill Jemas, saying that the company had "never done hardcovers but every time we've done one, it's been spectacularly successful." Twelve oversized hardcovers were released in 2002.

A smaller 'premiere' hardcover size, plus the thicker 'omnibus' format, both launched in the mid-2000s - however the oversized hardcover continued to be Marvel's preferred choice of premium release for recent content. The much-heralded return of the Star Wars licence to Marvel in 2015 saw the publisher use the format to release three remasters of comics from the original trilogy.

== Format overlap and shift ==
The 376-page Superior Foes Of Spider-Man omnibus versus the 648-page Spider-Verse OHC

With the omnibus and oversized hardcover line running side-by-side while sharing the same print size, there was often confusion in regards to how Marvel classified books. In 2015, a Spider-Verse 'oversized hardcover' was released at 648 pages; yet, months later, a Superior Foes Of Spider-Man 'omnibus' came out, with only 376 pages. Both collected full runs of a Spider-Man miniseries that had been released within the prior two years. In February 2019, the Hulk: Dogs Of War 'oversized hardcover' was 832 pages; while, four months later, Hulk by Loeb and McGuinness was a 912-page 'omnibus'.

Meanwhile, the 2011 'oversized hardcover' of X-Men: Fall Of The Mutants was re-released with the exact same page count and cover in 2022, but using 'omnibus' branding; while 2025's X-Men: Fatal Attractions 'omnibus' has identical content to the 2012 'oversized hardcover'.

The shortest omnibus was 2007's Devil Dinosaur at 184 pages, while the largest oversized hardcover was 2013's Avengers vs. X-Men Companion at 1,112 pages.

By 2022, even though the overall comics market "was a success on the surface", the generally thinner oversized hardcover format was struggling. Costs had increased for both retailers and consumers, especially in regards to shipping. This led to a priority shift towards the softcover trade paperback format, and manga-style digests. This was borne out by Marvel's 2025 launch of the 9in x 6in Premier Collection, in response to DC's Compact Comics, which had been a big hit for retailers.

As a result, just 18 oversized hardcovers came out in 2022, with eight in 2023 - a far cry from the 49 of 2011 and 45 of 2010. Only four books were released in 2024, each rounding off a creator's run that had already started in the format. Those numbers compared to 2024's record 89 omnibuses and 87 Epic Collections, including reprints, signalling the priority change.

Only three oversized hardcovers are scheduled for 2025: Rob Liefeld's Deadpool Badbadder Blood one-shot; the fourth volume of X-Force by Benjamin Percy, and a Red Band edition of the Blood Hunt event.

== Marvel Universe OHCs ==
These books contain stories that take place in the primary Marvel Universe. This fictional continuity is often referred to as Earth-616, with a legacy that stretches back to 1939.

=== Alias ===
Title	Years covered	Material collected	Pages	Released	ISBN
Alias	2001	Alias #1-9	208	18 Sep 2002	Michael Gaydos cover: 978-0785108726

=== Avengers ===
#	Title	Years covered	Material collected	Pages	Released	ISBN
	Avengers: Kree-Skrull War	1971-1972	Avengers #89–97	240	2 May 2012	Neal Adams cover: 978-0785164791
1	Avengers Assemble Vol. 1	1998	Avengers (vol. 3) #1–11; Annual 1998	384	27 Apr 2005	George Perez cover: 978-0785115731
2	Avengers Assemble Vol. 2	1998-1999	Avengers (vol. 3) #12–22, #0; Annual 1999	336	23 Mar 2005	George Perez cover: 978-0785117735
3	Avengers Assemble Vol. 3	1999-2000	Avengers (vol. 3) #23–34, 1, ½; Thunderbolts #42-44	432	12 Jul 2006	George Perez cover: 978-0785121305
4	Avengers Assemble Vol. 4	2000-2001	Avengers (vol. 3) #35–40; Maximum Security #1–3; Maximum Security: Dangerous Planet; Avengers: The Ultron Imperative; Avengers Annual 2000	416	17 Jan 2007	Alan Davis cover: 978-0785123477
5	Avengers Assemble Vol. 5	2001-2002	Avengers (vol. 3) #41–56; Avengers Annual 2001	432	24 Oct 2007	Andy Kubert cover: 978-0785123484
	Avengers Forever	1998-1999	Avengers Forever #1–12	328	19 Aug 2009	Carlos Pacheco cover: 978-0785137962
	Avengers Disassembled	2004	Avengers #500–503; Avengers Finale	184	20 Dec 2006	David Finch cover: 978-0785122944
	Avengers Disassembled: Iron Man, Captain America & Thor	2004	Captain America (1998) #29–32; Captain America & The Falcon (2004) #5–7; Thor (1998) #80–85; Iron Man (1998) #84–89	456	18 Mar 2009	Steve Epting cover: 978-0785138846
Jump To: Secret War
1	New Avengers Vol. 1	2004-2005	New Avengers #1–10; New Avengers: Most Wanted Files; New Avengers, Guest Starring The Fantastic Four	352	21 Nov 2007	David Finch cover: 978-0785124641
1	New Avengers Vol. 1	2004-2005	New Avengers #1–10; New Avengers: Most Wanted Files; New Avengers, Guest Starring The Fantastic Four	352	21 Nov 2007	Bookshop variant cover: 978-0785129554
2	New Avengers Vol. 2	2005-2006	New Avengers #11–20; New Avengers Annual (2005); Giant-Size Spider-Woman	296	2 Apr 2008	Steve McNiven cover: 978-0785130857
2	New Avengers Vol. 2	2005-2006	New Avengers #11–20; New Avengers Annual (2005); Giant-Size Spider-Woman	296	2 Apr 2008	David Finch DM cover: 978-0785131359
Jump To: Civil War
3	New Avengers Vol. 3	2006-2007	New Avengers #21–31; New Avengers: Illuminati; Civil War: The Confession; Civil War: The Initiative	360	28 Jan 2009	Bookshop cover: 978-0785137634
3	New Avengers Vol. 3	2006-2007	New Avengers #21–31; New Avengers: Illuminati; Civil War: The Confession; Civil War: The Initiative	360	28 Jan 2009	Leinil Francis Yu DM cover: Unknown ISBN
4	New Avengers Vol. 4	2007-2008	New Avengers #32–37; New Avengers Annual #2; New Avengers: Illuminati #1–5	320	28 Apr 2010	Jim Cheung cover: 978-0785142621
5	New Avengers Vol. 5	2008	New Avengers #38–47	256	9 Jun 2010	Aleksi Briclot cover: 978-0785145790
Jump To: Secret Invasion
6	New Avengers Vol. 6	2009	New Avengers #48–54; Secret Invasion: Dark Reign; FCBD 2009: Avengers	256	1 Jun 2011	Billy Tan cover: 978-0785156482
7	New Avengers Vol. 7	2009-2010	New Avengers #55–64; New Avengers Annual #3; Dark Reign: The List - Avengers; New Avengers Finale	368	7 Sep 2011	Bryan Hitch cover: 978-0785156765
Jump To: Siege
1	Mighty Avengers Vol. 1: Assemble	2007-2008	Mighty Avengers #1-11	304	25 Feb 2009	Frank Cho cover: 978-0785137580
1	Mighty Avengers Vol. 1: Assemble	2007-2008	Mighty Avengers #1-11	304	25 Feb 2009	Mark Bagley cover: 978-0785139317
2	Mighty Avengers Vol. 2: Secret Invasion	2008-2009	Mighty Avengers #12-20	240	10 Mar 2010	Marko Djurdjevic cover: 978-0785142614
3	Mighty Avengers Vol. 3: Dark Reign	2009-2010	Mighty Avengers #21–36; material from Secret Invasion: Requiem	424	3 Aug 2011	Khoi Pham cover: 978-0785156697
Jump To: Avengers/X-Men Utopia
	Dark Avengers	2009-2010	Dark Avengers #1–6, 9–16; Annual	400	6 Jul 2011	Mike Deodato cover: 978-0785156505
	Avengers By Brian Michael Bendis: The Heroic Age	2010	Avengers (vol. 4) #1–6; Avengers Prime #1–5; New Avengers (vol. 2) #1–6	448	14 Mar 2012	Movie cover: 978-0785161981
	Avengers By Brian Michael Bendis: The Heroic Age	2010	Avengers (vol. 4) #1–6; Avengers Prime #1–5; New Avengers (vol. 2) #1–6	448	14 Mar 2012	John Romita Jr. cover: 978-0785164654
	Avengers Assemble by Brian Michael Bendis	2012	Avengers Assemble (vol. 2) #1–8	184	16 Jan 2013	Movie cover: 978-0785165576
	Avengers Assemble by Brian Michael Bendis	2012	Avengers Assemble (vol. 2) #1–8	184	16 Jan 2013	Mark Bagley cover: 978-0785163275
Jump To: Avengers vs. X-Men
1	Avengers by Jonathan Hickman Vol. 1	2012-2013	Avengers (vol. 5) #1–13	328	8 Apr 2015	Dustin Weaver cover: 978-0785191094
2	Avengers by Jonathan Hickman Vol. 2	2013-2014	Avengers (vol. 5) #14–23	272	2 Sep 2015	Leinil Francis Yu cover: 978-0785197089
3	Avengers by Jonathan Hickman Vol. 3	2014	Avengers (vol. 5) #24–34	288	3 Feb 2016	Mike Deodato cover: 978-0785198062
Jump To: Original Sin
1	New Avengers by Jonathan Hickman Vol. 1	2013	New Avengers (vol. 3) #1–12	304	8 Apr 2015	Jock cover: 978-0785193968
2	New Avengers by Jonathan Hickman Vol. 2	2014	New Avengers (vol. 3) #13–23	280	4 Nov 2015	Dale Keown cover: 978-0785197096
Jump To: Avengers & X-Men: AXIS
	Avengers: Time Runs Out	2014-2015	Avengers (vol. 5) #35–44; New Avengers (vol. 3) #24–33	520	6 Jul 2016	Jim Cheung & Justin Ponsor cover: 978-0785198093
Jump To: Secret Wars (2015)
Jump To: Civil War II
	All-New All-Different Avengers	2016	All-New, All-Different Avengers #1–12; material from Avengers #0; FCBD 2015: Avengers; FCBD 2016: Civil War II	424	2 Aug 2017	Mahmud Asrar cover: 978-1302904098
Jump To: Secret Empire
	Avengers: No Surrender	2017-2018	Avengers #675–690	352	27 Jun 2018	Mark Brooks cover: 978-1302911454
1	Avengers by Jason Aaron Vol. 1	2018-2019	Avengers (vol. 8) #1–12; material from FCBD 2018: Avengers/Captain America	328	17 Mar 2021	Sara Pichelli cover: 978-1302928186
2	Avengers by Jason Aaron Vol. 2	2019-2020	Avengers (vol. 8) #13–21; material from FCBD 2019: Avengers/Savage Avengers	224	13 Apr 2022	Stefano Caselli cover: 978-1302931797
3	Avengers by Jason Aaron Vol. 3	2019-2020	Avengers (vol. 8) #22–30	208	19 Oct 2022	Ed McGuinness cover: 978-1302945152
4	Avengers by Jason Aaron Vol. 4	2020-2021	Avengers (vol. 8) #31-45	352	26 Jul 2023	Ed McGuinness cover: 978-1302950132
5	Avengers by Jason Aaron Vol. 5	2021-2022	Avengers (vol. 8) #46-62, Avengers 1,000,000 BC, material from FCBD 2021: Avengers/Hulk	496	21 Aug 2024	Ed McGuinness cover: 978-1302956868
Miniseries
1	Avengers: Earth's Mightiest Heroes	2005	Avengers: Earth's Mightiest Heroes #1-8	192	11 May 2005	978-0785114383
2	Avengers: Earth's Mightiest Heroes II	2007	Avengers: Earth's Mightiest Heroes (vol. 2) #1-8	192	22 Aug 2005	978-0785118510
	Avengers: The Origin	2010	Avengers: The Origin #1–5; Avengers #1	144	24 Nov 2010	Phil Noto cover: 978-0785143567
	Avengers: Mythos	2011	Avengers Origins: Ant-Man & the Wasp; Avengers Origins: Luke Cage, and more: Avengers Origins: The Scarlet Witch & Quicksilver; Avengers Origins: Vision; Avengers Origins: Thor; Mythos: Captain America; Mythos: Hulk	208	4 Apr 2011	Marko Djurdjevic cover: 978-0785153504
	Avengers: X-Sanction	2011-2012	Avengers: X-Sanction #1-4	112	2 May 2012	Ed McGuinness cover: 978-0785158622
	Avengers: Endless Wartime	2013	Original Graphic Novel by Warren Ellis and Mike McKone	120	2 Oct 2013	Marko Djurdjevic cover: 978-0785184676
	Avengers: Rage Of Ultron	2015	Original Graphic Novel by Rick Remender, Pepe Larraz and Jerome Opena	112	1 Apr 2015	Jerome Opena cover: 978-0785190400
	Avengers: Standoff!	2016	Avengers Standoff: Welcome to Pleasant Hill, and more: Avengers Standoff: Assault on Pleasant Hill Alpha/Omega; Agents Of S.H.I.E.L.D. #3–4; Uncanny Avengers #7–8; All-New, All-Different Avengers #7–8; New Avengers #8–10; Captain America: Sam Wilson #7–8; Illuminati #6; Howling Commandos Of S.H.I.E.L.D. #6	416	29 Jun 2016	Jesus Saiz cover: 978-1302901479
Jump To: The Ultimates

=== Black Panther ===
#	Title	Years covered	Material collected	Pages	Released	ISBN
1	Black Panther Vol. 1: A Nation Under Our Feet	2016-2017	Black Panther (2016) #1–12	296	2 Aug 2017	Brian Stelfreeze cover: 978-1302904159
2	Black Panther Vol. 2: Avengers Of New World	2017-2018	Black Panther (2016) #13-18, #166-172	264	14 Nov 2018	Brian Stelfreeze cover: 978-1302908959
3	Black Panther Vol. 3: Intergalactic Empire 1	2018-2019	Black Panther (2018) #1-12	280	4 Nov 2020	Inhyuk Lee cover: 978-1302925314
4	Black Panther Vol. 4: Intergalactic Empire 2	2019-2021	Black Panther (2018) #13-25	328	13 Apr 2022	Daniel Acuna cover: 978-1302925420

=== Cable ===
#	Title	Years covered	Material collected	Pages	Released	ISBN
	Cable: Soldier X	2001-2003	Cable (1993) #97–107; Soldier X #1–12	584	24 Oct 2018	Howard Porter cover: 978-1302913984
1	Cable by Duggan & Noto	2020	Cable (2020) #1–4, 7–12	288	13 Apr 2022	Phil Noto cover: 978-1302933968

=== Captain America ===
#	Title	Years covered	Material collected	Pages	Released	ISBN
	Captain America: Sentinel Of Liberty	1998-1999	Captain America: Sentinel Of Liberty #1–12; Captain America: Sentinel Of Liberty #1 Rough Cut	360	30 Mar 2011	Ron Garney cover: 978-0785149637
	Captain America: The New Deal	2002	Captain America (vol. 4) #1-6	176	10 Feb 2003	John Cassaday cover: 978-0785109785
	Captain America: Red, White And Blue	2002	Original Graphic Novel	192	Sep 2002	Brian Stelfreeze cover: 978-0785110330
	Captain America: Winter Soldier	2005-2006	Captain America (vol. 5) #1–9, 11–14	312	26 Feb 2014	Movie cover: 978-0785187943
	Captain America: Winter Soldier	2005-2006	Captain America (vol. 5) #1–9, 11–14	312	26 Feb 2014	Steve Epting DM cover: 978-0785187950
Jump To: Civil War
	Captain America Fallen Son: The Death Of Captain America	2007	Fallen Son: Wolverine; Fallen Son: Avengers; Fallen Son: Captain America; Fallen Son: Spider-Man; Fallen Son: Iron Man; Captain America Comics #1; material from Marvel Spotlight: Captain America Remembered	224	24 Jun 2009	Ed McGuinness cover: 978-0785141280
Jump To: Secret Empire
1	Captain America by Ta-Nehisi Coates Vol. 1	2018-2019	Captain America (vol. 9) #1–12	296	25 Mar 2020	Alex Ross cover: 978-1302923228
2	Captain America by Ta-Nehisi Coates Vol. 2	2019-2020	Captain America (vol. 9) #13–25	400	13 Apr 2020	Alex Ross cover: 978-1302925437
Miniseries
	Captain America: White	2008	Captain America: White #0–5	160	17 Feb 2016	Tim Sale cover: 978-0785194194
	Captain America: Theater Of War	2009	Captain America: Theater of War - America the Beautiful; Brother in Arms; To Soldier On; Ghosts of My Country	152	24 Feb 2010	Steve Epting cover: 978-0785139904
	Captain America: America First!	2009-2010	Captain America: Theater of War - America First!; Operation Zero Point; Prisoners Of Duty	128	9 Jun 2010	Howawrd Chaykin cover: 978-0785139065
	Captain America: Forever Allies	2010	Captain America: Forever Allies #1–4; Young Allies Comics 70th Anniversary Special; Young Allies #1 Rough Cut	186	18 May 2011	Lee Weeks cover: 978-0785153245

=== Captain Britain ===
Title	Years covered	Material collected	Pages	Released	ISBN
Captain Britain Vol. 1: Birth Of Legend	1976-1977	Material from Captain Britain #1–39; Super Spider-Man and Captain Britain #231–232	376	1 Jun 2011	Herb Trimpe cover: 978-0785157281
Captain Britain Vol. 2: Siege Of Camelot	1977-1978	Super Spider-Man and Captain Britain #233–247; Marvel Team-Up (1972) #65–66; material from Hulk Comic #1, 3–46; Incredible Hulk Weekly #47–55, 57–63	376	28 Sep 2011	Herb Trimpe cover: 978-0785157533

=== Carnage ===
Title	Years covered	Material collected	Pages	Released	ISBN
Carnage Family Feud	2010	Carnage (2010) #1–5	168	24 Aug 2011	Clayton Crain cover: 978-0785151128
Carnage U.S.A.	2012	Carnage U.S.A. (2012) #1–5	112	13 Jun 2012	Clayton Crain cover: 978-0785160731

=== Daredevil ===
#	Title	Years covered	Material collected	Pages	Released	ISBN
1	Daredevil Vol. 1	1998-2001	Daredevil (vol. 2) #1–15, #½	336	8 Apr 2003	978-0785110156
1	Daredevil Vol. 1	1998-2001	Daredevil (vol. 2) #1–15, #½	336	13 Sep 2006	978-0785124016
2	Daredevil Vol. 2	2001-2002	Daredevil (vol. 2) #26-37	288	4 Dec 2002	978-0785109266
3	Daredevil Vol. 3	2002-2003	Daredevil (vol. 2) #38-50	320	1 Mar 2004	978-0785111061
4	Daredevil Vol. 4	2004	Daredevil (vol. 2) #56-65	280	31 Aug 2005	978-0785113423
5	Daredevil Vol. 5	2004-2005	Daredevil (vol. 2) #66-75	256	28 Jun 2006	978-0785121107
6	Daredevil Vol. 6	2001, 2005–2006	Daredevil (vol. 2) #16-19, #76-81	304	11 Oct 2006	978-0785121114
1	Daredevil by Mark Waid, Vol. 1	2011-2012	Daredevil (vol. 3) #1–10, 10.1, Amazing Spider–Man #677	288	26 Feb 2013	978-0785168065
2	Daredevil by Mark Waid, Vol. 2	2012-2013	Daredevil (vol. 3) #11–21, Avenging Spider–Man #6, Punisher #10	296	25 Feb 2014	978-0785184799
3	Daredevil by Mark Waid, Vol. 3	2013-2014	Daredevil (vol. 3) #22–36, Indestructible Hulk #9–10	368	15 Jul 2014	978-0785190233
4	Daredevil by Mark Waid & Chris Samnee Vol. 4	2014	Daredevil (vol. 4) #1–10, 0.1, 1.50	312	16 Feb 2016	978-0785195344
5	Daredevil by Mark Waid & Chris Samnee Vol. 5	2015	Daredevil (vol. 4) #11–18, 15.1	216	17 May 2016	978-1302900601
1	Daredevil by Chip Zdarsky Vol. 1: To Heaven Through Hell	2019	Daredevil (vol. 6) #1–10	232	17 Mar 2021	978-1302928247
2	Daredevil by Chip Zdarsky Vol. 2: To Heaven Through Hell	2019-2020	Daredevil (vol. 6) #11–20	224	23 Mar 2022	978-1302931995
3	Daredevil by Chip Zdarsky Vol. 3: To Heaven Through Hell	2020-2021	Daredevil (vol. 6) #21–30, Daredevil Annual (2020)	264	2 Nov 2022	978-1302945114
4	Daredevil by Chip Zdarsky Vol. 4: To Heaven Through Hell	2021	Daredevil (vol. 6) #31–36, Daredevil: Woman Without Fear #1–3	264	19 Jul 2023	978-1302950057
Miniseries
	Daredevil/Elektra: Love And War	1986-1987	Marvel Graphic Novel: Daredevil: Love And War, Elektra: Assassin #1-8	328	6 Nov 2002	978-0785110323
	Daredevil: Yellow	2001-2002	Daredevil: Yellow #1-6	160	18 Sep 2002	978-0785108405
	Daredevil: Father	2004-2007	Daredevil: Father #1-6	200	20 Dec 2006	978-0785115441
	Daredevil: End Of Days	2008	Daredevil: End Of Days #1-8	232	3 Jul 2018	978-0785124207

=== Deadpool ===
#	Title	Years covered	Material collected	Pages	Released	ISBN
	Deadpool	2008-2009	Deadpool (2008) #1–12; Thunderbolts #130–131	352	22 Jun 2011	Ed McGuinness cover: 978-0785156024
	Deadpool: Merc With A Mouth	2008-2009	Deadpool: Merc With A Mouth #1–13	328	15 Sep 2010	Ed McGuinness cover: 978-0785145349
1	Deadpool Team-Up Vol. 1: Good Buddies	2010	Deadpool Team-Up (2010) #899–894; Marvel Spotlight: Deadpool	176	7 Jul 2010	Humberto Ramos cover: 978-0785145288
2	Deadpool Team-Up Vol. 2: Special Relationship	2010	Deadpool Team-Up (2010) #893–889; Deadpool Corps: Rank And File	192	8 Dec 2010	Humberto Ramos cover: 978-0785147114
3	Deadpool Team-Up Vol. 3: BFFS	2011	Deadpool Team-Up (2010) #888–883; Wolverine/Deadpool: The Decoy	168	18 May 2011	Humberto Ramos cover: 978-0785151395
	Deadpool MAX	2010-2011	Deadpool MAX (2010) #1–12; Deadpool MAX 2 (2011) #1–6; Deadpool MAX X-Mas Special	440	14 Nov 2012	Shawn Crystal cover: 978-0785157076
	Deadpool: Dead	2011-2012	Deadpool (2008) #50–63	320	12 Dec 2012	Dave Johnson cover: 978-0785162421
1	Deadpool by Posehn & Duggan Vol. 1	2013	Deadpool (2013) #1–12	280	5 Feb 2014	Geof Darrow cover: 978-0785154464
2	Deadpool by Posehn & Duggan Vol. 2	2013-2014	Deadpool (2013) #13–25	296	10 Jun 2015	Declan Shalvey cover: 978-0785197928
3	Deadpool by Posehn & Duggan Vol. 3	2014	Deadpool (2013) #26–34; Death of Wolverine: Deadpool & Captain America	312	7 Oct 2015	Mark Brooks cover: 978-0785198253
4	Deadpool by Posehn & Duggan Vol. 4	2014-2015	Deadpool (2013) #35–44	312	2 Dec 2015	Scott Koblish cover: 978-0785198260
1	Deadpool: World's Greatest Vol. 1	2016	Deadpool (2016) #1–7; Deadpool #3.1: Tres Punto Uno	264	4 Jan 2017	Mike Hawthorne cover: 978-1302904319
2	Deadpool: World's Greatest Vol. 2	2016	Deadpool (2016) #8–13; Deadpool: Last Days Of Magic	232	4 Oct 2017	Mike Allred cover: 978-1302908416
3	Deadpool: World's Greatest Vol. 3	2016-2017	Deadpool (2016) #14–20, 22–25; material from #21	272	3 Jan 2018	Tradd Moore cover: 978-1302908942
4	Deadpool: World's Greatest Vol. 4	2017	Deadpool (2016) #26–29; material from #21; Spider-Man/Deadpool #15–16; Deadpool & the Mercs For Money #10	248	6 Jun 2018	David Lopez cover: 978-1302912406
5	Deadpool: World's Greatest Vol. 5	2017	Deadpool (2016) #30–36, secret cover variants	248	29 Aug 2018	David Lopez cover: 978-1302913304
	Despicable Deadpool	2017-2018	Despicable Deadpool #287–300, secret cover variants	384	24 Apr 2019	David Lopez cover: 978-1302917159
Miniseries
	Deadpool: Suicide Kings	2008	Deadpool: Suicide Kings #1–5; Deadpool: Games Of Death	152	30 Sep 2009	Greg Land cover: 978-0785141723
	Deadpool: Wade Wilson's War	2010	Deadpool: Wade Wilson's War #1–4	112	24 Nov 2010	Jason Pearson cover: 978-0785145851
	Deadpool: Dracula's Gauntlet	2014	Deadpool: Dracula's Gauntlet #1–7	200	15 Oct 2014	Frank Cho cover: 978-0785184577
	Spider-Man/Deadpool by Kelly and McGuinness	2016-2017	Spider-Man/Deadpool #1–5, 8–10, 13–14, 17–18	264	7 Mar 2018	Ed McGuinness cover: 978-1302903725
	Deadpool: Bad Blood	2017	Original Graphic Novel by Rob Liefeld, Chris Sims and Chad Bowers	112	17 May 2017	Rob Liefeld cover: 978-1302909369
	Deadpool: Bad/Badder Blood	2025	Original Graphic Novel by Rob Liefeld, Chris Sims and Chad Bowers	264	25 Mar 2025	Rob Liefeld cover: 978-1302961190

=== Doctor Strange ===
#	Title	Years covered	Material collected	Pages	Released	ISBN
	Doctor Strange: The Oath (Local Comic Shop Day Exclusive)	2006	Doctor Strange: The Oath #1-5; material from Strange Tales (vol. 1) #110-111, #114-115	184	9 Nov 2016	Marcos Martin cover: 978-1302905057
1	Doctor Strange Vol. 1	2015-2016	Doctor Strange (2015) #1–10; Doctor Strange: Last Days Of Magic	280	6 Dec 2017	Chris Bachalo cover: 978-1302904326
2	Doctor Strange Vol. 2	2016-2017	Doctor Strange (2015) #11–20; Annual #1	272	14 Nov 2018	Kevin Nowlan cover: 978-1302908973
	Doctor Strange by Donny Cates	2018	Doctor Strange (2015) #381–390; Doctor Strange: Damnation #1–4	360	17 Apr 2019	Michael Del Mundo cover: 978-1302915292
	Strange Academy: First Class	2020	Strange Academy #1–6	320	26 Oct 2022	Humberto Ramos cover: 978-1302945756

=== Elektra ===
Title	Years covered	Material collected	Pages	Released	ISBN
Elektra Lives Again	1990	Original Graphic Novel by Frank Miller	80	25 Sep 2002	Frank Miller cover: 978-0785108900
Elektra & Wolverine: The Redeemer	2002	Elektra & Wolverine: The Redeemer #1–3	208	10 May 2002	Yoshitaka Amano cover: 978-0785109112

=== Eternals ===
Title	Years covered	Material collected	Pages	Released	ISBN
Eternals by Neil Gaiman	2006-2007	Eternals (vol. 3) #1–7	256	9 May 2007	Bookshop cover: 978-0785125419
Eternals by Neil Gaiman	2006-2007	Eternals (vol. 3) #1–7	256	9 May 2007	John Romita Jr. DM cover: 978-0785121763
Eternals by Gaiman & Romita Jr.	2006-2007	Eternals (vol. 3) #1–7	256	30 Dec 2020	John Romita Jr. cover: 978-1302925185

=== Excalibur ===
#	Title	Years covered	Material collected	Pages	Released	ISBN
1	Excalibur by Tini Howard Vol. 1	2019-2020	Excalibur (vol. 4) #1–12	336	4 Aug 2021	Mahmud Asrar cover: 978-1302929701
2	Excalibur by Tini Howard Vol. 2	2020-2021	Excalibur (vol. 4) #16–26	296	12 Oct 2022	Mahmud Asrar cover: 978-1302945183

=== Fantastic Four ===
#	Title	Years covered	Material collected	Pages	Released	ISBN
	Maximum Fantastic Four	1961	Fantastic Four (1961) #1 [One Page is One Panel]	224	16 Nov 2005	978-0785117926
	Best Of The Fantastic Four	1961-2002	Fantastic Four (1961) #1, 39–40, 51, 116, 176, 236, 267, 347–349; Fantastic Four (1998) #56, 60; Marvel Fanfare #15	360	11 May 2005	978-0785117827
	Fantastic Four: World's Greatest Comics Magazine	2001	Fantastic Four: World's Greatest Comics Magazine #1–12	360	7 Sep 2011	Erik Larsen cover: 978-0785156079
1	Fantastic Four Vol. 1	2002-2003	Fantastic Four (1998) #60–70; Fantastic Four #500–502	368	Aug 2004	Mike Wieringo cover: 978-0785114864
2	Fantastic Four Vol. 2	2003-2004	Fantastic Four #503–513	264	2 Mar 2005	Mike Wieringo cover: 978-0785117759
3	Fantastic Four Vol. 3	2004-2005	Fantastic Four #514–524	256	23 Nov 2005	Mike Wieringo cover: 978-0785120117
Jump To: Secret Wars (2015)
	Fantastic Four: Fate Of The Four	2017-2018	Marvel Two-In-One (2017) #1–12; Marvel Two-In-One Annual (2018)	296	8 Dec 2021	Paul Renaud cover: 978-1302931278
1	Fantastic Four by Dan Slott Vol. 1	2018-2019	Fantastic Four (vol. 6) #1–11; Fantastic Four Wedding Special; Fantastic Four (vol. 1) #8	368	10 Mar 2021	Inhyuk Lee cover: 978-1302928278
2	Fantastic Four by Dan Slott Vol. 2	2019-2020	Fantastic Four (vol. 6) #12 (A story), #14–20; Fantastic Four: 4 Yancy Street; Fantastic Four: Negative Zone	288	16 Feb 2022	Nick Bradshaw cover: 978-1302931827
3	Fantastic Four by Dan Slott Vol. 3	2020-2021	Fantastic Four (vol. 6) #21–30; Empyre: Fantastic Four; Empyre Fallout: Fantastic Four	304	1 Feb 2023	Mark Brooks cover: 978-1302945343
4	Fantastic Four by Dan Slott Vol. 4	2021-2022	Fantastic Four (vol. 6) #31-39; Fantastic Four: Road Trip; Fantastic Four: Grimm Noir	352	13 Dec 2023	Valerio Schiti cover: 978-1302950309
5	Fantastic Four: Reckoning War	2022-2023	Fantastic Four: Reckoning War Alpha; Fantastic Four (vol. 6) #40-46, Reckoning War: Trial Of The Watcher	248	10 Dec 2024	CAFU cover: 978-1302956240
Jump To: Ultimate Fantastic Four

=== Guardians Of The Galaxy ===
#	Title	Years covered	Material collected	Pages	Released	ISBN
Jump To: War Of Kings
1	Guardians Of The Galaxy Vol. 1	2013-2014	Guardians Of The Galaxy (2013) #0.1, #1–10; Guardians Of The Galaxy: Tomorrow's Avengers #1	312	6 May 2015	Movie cover: 978-0785194002
1	Guardians Of The Galaxy Vol. 1	2013-2014	Guardians Of The Galaxy (2013) #0.1, #1–10; Guardians Of The Galaxy: Tomorrow's Avengers #1	312	6 May 2015	Steve McNiven Rocket DM cover: 978-0785197751
2	Guardians Of The Galaxy Vol. 2	2014	Guardians Of The Galaxy (2013) #11–17; All-New X-Men #22–24; FCBD (Guardians Of The Galaxy) 2014	312	6 Jan 2016	Sara Pichelli cover: 978-0785198246
3	Guardians Of The Galaxy Vol. 3	2014-2015	Guardians Of The Galaxy (2013) #18–27; Annual #2	272	7 Sep 2016	Alex Ross cover: 978-1302900083
	Guardians Of The Galaxy/X-Men: The Black Vortex	2014	The Black Vortex: Alpha; The Black Vortex: Omega; Guardians Of The Galaxy (2013) #24–25; Legendary Star-Lord #9–11; All-New X-Men #38–39; Guardians Team-Up #3; Nova #28; Cyclops #12; Captain Marvel #14	312	1 Jul 2015	Ed McGuinness cover: 978-0785197706
4	Guardians Of The Galaxy Vol. 4	2015-2016	Guardians Of The Galaxy (2015) #1–10	240	13 Dec 2016	Arthur Adams cover: 978-1302904371
5	Guardians Of The Galaxy Vol. 5	2016-2017	Guardians Of The Galaxy (2015) #11–19; FCBD 2016 (Civil War II)	272	15 Aug 2018	Arthur Adams cover: 978-1302908966
	Guardians Of The Galaxy by Donny Cates	2019	Guardians Of The Galaxy (2019) #1–12; Annual #1	328	6 Jan 2021	Patrick Zircher cover: 978-1302926731

=== Hawkeye ===
#	Title	Years covered	Material collected	Pages	Released	ISBN
1	Hawkeye Vol. 1	2012-2013	Hawkeye (2012) #1–11; Young Avengers Presents #6	272	6 Nov 2013	David Aja cover: 978-0785184874
2	Hawkeye Vol. 2	2013-2014	Hawkeye (2012) #12–22; Annual #1	280	6 Nov 2013	David Aja cover: 978-0785154617
3	Hawkeye Vol. 3	2015	All-New Hawkeye #1–5; All-New Hawkeye (vol. 2) #1–6	248	5 Oct 2016	Ramon K. Perez cover: 978-1302902193

=== Hellions ===
Title	Years covered	Material collected	Pages	Released	ISBN
Hellions by Zeb Wells	2020-2021	Hellions #1–18	512	26 Oct 2022	Stephen Segovia cover: 978-1302933722

=== Hulk ===
#	Title	Years covered	Material collected	Pages	Released	ISBN
	Incredible Hulk: Dogs Of War	2000-2001	Incredible Hulk (2000) #12–33; Annual 2000–2001, Hulk (1999) #½; Sentry/Hulk; Hulk Smash #1–2; Startling Stories: Banner #1–4	832	13 Feb 2019	John Romita Jr. cover: 978-1302915940
1	Incredible Hulk Vol. 1	2001-2002	Incredible Hulk (2000) #34–43; Startling Stories: Banner #1–4	352	13 Nov 2002	John Romita Jr. cover: 978-0785110224
2	Incredible Hulk Vol. 2	2002-2003	Incredible Hulk (2000) #44–54	296	1 Dec 2003	Kaare Andrews cover: 978-0785111429
	Planet Hulk	2006	Incredible Hulk (2000) #92–105; Giant-Size Hulk; material from Amazing Fantasy (2004) #15	392	13 Jun 2007	Marc Silvestri cover: 978-0785122456
	Giant-Size Hulk	2006	Giant-Size Hulk; Giant-Size Incredible Hulk; Hulk: Raging Thunder; Hulk vs. Hercules: When Titans Collide	112	31 Dec 2008	Gary Frank cover: 978-0785136699
	World War Hulk	2007	Hulk: World War Hulk #1–5; World War Hulk: Aftersmash; Marvel Spotlight: World War Hulk, Planet Hulk Saga	304	1 May 2009	John Romita Jr. cover: 978-0785126706
	Hercules: Smash Of The Titans	2007-2008	Incredible Hulk (2000) #106–112; Incredible Hercules #113–115; Hulk vs. Hercules: When Titans Collide	248	15 Jul 2009	Gary Frank cover: 978-0785139683
	Hercules: Sacred Invasion	2008	Incredible Hercules #116–125	264	24 Feb 2010	John Romita Jr. cover: 978-0785142560
	Hulk: Green Hulk/Red Hulk	2008	Hulk (2008) #1–9; King-Size Hulk, material from Wolverine #50	304	11 Nov 2009	Ed McGuinness cover: 978-0785142560
	Hulk: No More	2008-2009	Hulk (2008) #10–18; Incredible Hulk #600	336	11 Jun 2011	Alex Ross cover: 978-0785153191
	Incredible Hulks: Fall Of The Hulks	2009-2010	Fall Of The Hulks: Alpha, Incredible Hulk #601–608; Dark Reign: The List - Hulk; Fall Of The Hulks: Red Hulk #1–4; M.O.D.O.K.: Reign Delay; Fall Of The Hulks: M.O.D.O.K.; material from Incredible Hulk #600	512	1 Feb 2012	John Romita Jr. cover: 978-0785162117
	World War Hulks	2010	Hulk (2008) #19–24; World War Hulks: Gamma	256	4 Jan 2012	Ed McGuinness cover: 978-0785160397
	Incredible Hulks: World War Hulks	2010	World War Hulks; Fall of the Hulks: Savage She-Hulks #1–3; Hulked-Out Heroes #1–2; World War Hulks: Spider-Man vs. Thor #1–2; World War Hulks: Captain America vs. Wolverine #1–2; Incredible Hulk #312, #609–611	448	21 Mar 2012	John Romita Jr. cover: 978-0785162155
1	Incredible Hulk by Jason Aaron Vol. 1	2011	Incredible Hulk (2011) #1–7; material from Fear Itself #7	176	20 Jun 2012	Marc Silvestri cover: 978-0785133285
2	Incredible Hulk by Jason Aaron Vol. 2	2011-2012	Incredible Hulk (2011) #7.1, #8–15	200	19 Dec 2012	Michael Komarck cover: 978-0785161127
1	Immortal Hulk Vol. 1	2018-2019	Immortal Hulk #1–10; material from Avengers #684	264	2 Oct 2012	Alex Ross cover: 978-1302919658
2	Immortal Hulk Vol. 2	2019	Immortal Hulk #11–20	232	8 Jul 2020	Alex Ross cover: 978-1302923471
3	Immortal Hulk Vol. 3	2019-2020	Immortal Hulk #21–30	256	28 Apr 2021	Alex Ross cover: 978-1302928308
4	Immortal Hulk Vol. 4	2020	Immortal Hulk #31–40	248	24 Nov 2021	Alex Ross cover: 978-1302931285
5	Immortal Hulk Vol. 5	2021	Immortal Hulk #41–50	304	7 Dec 2022	Alex Ross cover: 978-1302945268
Miniseries
	Hulk: Gray	2003	Hulk: Gray #1–6	160	24 Jun 2004	Tim Sale cover: 978-0785113140

=== Hulk (Skaar) ===
Title	Years covered	Material collected	Pages	Released	ISBN
Skaar: Son Of Hulk	2008	Skaar: Son Of Hulk #1–6; Skaar: Son Of Hulk Presents Savage World Of Sakaar; material from Hulk Family: Green Genes	200	8 Apr 2009	Ron Garney cover: 978-0785136675
Skaar: Planet Skaar	2008-2009	Skaar: Son Of Hulk #7–12; Planet Skaar Prologue	176	16 Sep 2009	Ed McGuinness cover: 978-0785139867
Hulk: Son Of Hulk: Dark Son Rising	2009-2010	Son Of Hulk #13–17	120	27 Jan 2010	David Palumbo cover: 978-0785145448

=== Inhumans ===
#	Title	Years covered	Material collected	Pages	Released	ISBN
	Inhumans by Paul Jenkins & Jae Lee	1998-1999	Inhumans (1998) #1–12	304	11 Sep 2013	Jae Lee cover: 978-0785184744
Jump To: Inhumanity
	Inhuman	2014-2015	Inhuman #1–14, Annual #1	352	2 Mar 2016	Ryan Stegman cover: 978-0785195573
1	Uncanny Inhumans Vol. 1	2015-2016	Uncanny Inhumans #0–10; material from FCBD 2015: Avengers	280	1 Mar 2017	Nick Bradshaw cover: 978-1302903831
2	Uncanny Inhumans Vol. 2	2016-2017	Uncanny Inhumans #11–20; Annual #1	264	14 Nov 2017	Ryan Stegman cover: 978-1302908454
	Inhumans vs. X-Men	2017	Inhumans vs. X-Men #0–6	208	5 Jul 2017	Leinil Francis Yu cover: 978-1302906535
	Black Bolt	2017-2018	Black Bolt (2017) #1–12	288	1 Jan 2020	Christian Ward cover: 978-1302921408

=== Invaders ===
Title	Years covered	Material collected	Pages	Released	ISBN
Avengers/Invaders	2008-2009	Avengers/Invaders #1–12; Avengers/Invaders Sketchbook	352	30 Sep 2009	Alex Ross cover 978-0785129424
Invaders Now!	2010	Invaders Now! #1–5	120	13 Apr 2011	Alex Ross cover 978-0785139126
Always An Invader	2018-2019	Invaders (2019) #1–12, Namor: The Best Defense	304	6 Jan 2021	Alex Ross cover 978-1302927356
Always An Invader	2018-2019	Invaders (2019) #1–12, Namor: The Best Defense	304	6 Jan 2021	Skottie Young DM cover: 978-1302927745

=== Iron Man ===
#	Title	Years covered	Material collected	Pages	Released	ISBN
	Iron Man: Extremis	2005	Iron Man (2005) #1–6	184	31 Mar 2010	Adi Granov cover 978-0785142591
1	Invincible Iron Man Vol. 1	2008-2009	Invincible Iron Man (2008) #1–19	344	3 Mar 2010	Salvador Larroca cover 978-0785142959
2	Invincible Iron Man Vol. 2	2009-2010	Invincible Iron Man (2008) #20–33	408	4 Jan 2012	Salvador Larroca cover 978-0785145530
	Iron Man: Fatal Frontier	2013-2014	Iron Man: Fatal Frontier Infinite Comic #1–13	240	7 May 2014	Paul Renaud cover 978-0785184560
	Invincible Iron Man by Brian Michael Bendis	2015-2016	Invincible Iron Man (2015) #1–14	328	7 Feb 2018	David Marquez cover 978-1302904487
Miniseries
	Iron Age	2011	The Iron Age #1–3; Iron Age: Alpha; Iron Age: Omega	192	26 Oct 2011	Ariel Olivetti cover: 978-0785152699

=== Loki ===
Title	Years covered	Material collected	Pages	Released	ISBN
Loki	2004	Loki (2004) #1–4	104	26 Jan 2005	Esad Ribic cover 978-0785116523
Thor & Loki: Blood Brothers	2004	Loki (2004) #1–4; Thor (vol. 3) #12; material from Journey Into Mystery #85, 112	152	16 Feb 2011	Esad Ribic cover 978-0785149682

=== Luke Cage ===
Title	Years covered	Material collected	Pages	Released	ISBN
Cage	2002	Cage (vol. 2) #1–6	128	16 Dec 2002	Richard Corben cover 978-0785109662

=== Marauders ===
#	Title	Years covered	Material collected	Pages	Released	ISBN
1	Marauders by Gerry Duggan Vol. 1	2019-2020	Marauders (2019) #1–12	336	1 Sep 2021	Russell Dauterman cover 978-1302929756
2	Marauders by Gerry Duggan Vol. 2	2020-2021	Marauders (2019) #16–20, 22–27; King In Black: Marauders	384	1 Feb 2023	Russell Dauterman cover 978-1302945213

=== Marvels ===
Title	Years covered	Material collected	Pages	Released	ISBN
Marvels: 10th Anniversary Edition	1994	Marvels #0–4	400	31 Mar 2004	Alex Ross cover 978-0785113881
Marvels Project: Birth Of The Superheroes	2009-2010	Marvels Project #1–8	208	28 Jul 2010	Steve McNiven cover: 978-0785146308
Marvels Project: Birth Of The Superheroes	2009-2010	Marvels Project #1–8	208	28 Jul 2010	Steve Epting Torch DM cover: 978-0785149880
Marvels: 25th Anniversary Edition	1994, 2019	Marvels #0–4; Marvels Epilogue; Marvels 25th tribute variants; material from Marvels Annotated #1–4	504	18 Mar 2020	Alex Ross cover 978-1302919870
Marvels Snapshots	2020	Sub-Mariner: Marvels Snapshots; Fantastic Four: Marvels Snapshots, and more: Captain America: Marvels Snapshots; X-Men: Marvels Snapshots; Avengers: Marvels Snapshots; Spider-Man: Marvels Snapshots; Civil War: Marvels Snapshots; Captain Marvel: Marvels Snapshots	264	2 Jun 2021	Alex Ross cover 978-1302924966

=== Ms Marvel (Kamala Khan) ===
#	Title	Years covered	Material collected	Pages	Released	ISBN
1	Ms. Marvel Vol. 1	2014-2015	Ms. Marvel (vol. 3) #1–11; material from All-New Marvel NOW! Point One	256	19 Aug 2015	Sara Pichelli cover 978-0785198284
2	Ms. Marvel Vol. 2	2015	Ms. Marvel (vol. 3) #12–19; S.H.I.E.L.D. #2; material from Amazing Spider-Man (vol. 4) #7–8	232	6 Apr 2016	Kris Anka cover 978-0785198369
3	Ms. Marvel Vol. 3	2016	Ms. Marvel (vol. 4) #1–12	280	14 Jun 2017	Cliff Chiang cover 978-1302903619
4	Ms. Marvel Vol. 4	2016-2017	Ms. Marvel (vol. 4) #13–24	272	13 Jun 2018	Valerio Schiti cover 978-1302909130
5	Ms. Marvel Vol. 5	2018-2019	Ms. Marvel (vol. 4) #25–38	320	14 Aug 2019	Sara Pichelli cover 978-1302917357

=== Moon Knight ===
Title	Years covered	Material collected	Pages	Released	ISBN
Moon Knight by Brian Michael Bendis & Alex Maleev	2011-2012	Moon Knight (vol. 6) #1–12	288	7 Mar 2018	Alex Maleev cover 978-1302909994
Moon Knight by Jeff Lemire & Greg Smallwood	2016-2017	Moon Knight (vol. 8) #1–14	320	5 Sep 2018	Greg Smallwood cover 978-1302912857

=== Punisher ===
#	Title	Years covered	Material collected	Pages	Released	ISBN
1	Punisher Vol. 1	2000-2001	The Punisher (vol. 5) #1-12; Punisher Kills The Marvel Universe	352	21 Aug 2002	Tim Bradstreet cover: 978-0785109822
2	Punisher Vol. 2	2001-2002	Punisher (vol. 6) #1-7, 13–18	320	22 Jun 2003	Tim Bradstreet cover: 978-0785111702
3	Punisher Vol. 3	2002-2003	Punisher (vol. 6) #19–27	232	21 Jan 2004	Steve Dillon cover: 978-0785113171
1	Punisher MAX 1	2004-2005	The Punisher (vol. 7) #1-12	304	14 Sep 2005	Tim Bradstreet cover: 978-0785118404
2	Punisher MAX 2	2005	The Punisher (vol. 7) #13-24	296	8 Feb 2006	Tim Bradstreet cover: 978-0785120223
3	Punisher MAX 3	2006	The Punisher (vol. 7) #25–36	296	30 May 2007	Tim Bradstreet cover: 978-0785119814
4	Punisher MAX 4	2006-2007	The Punisher (vol. 7) #37–49	312	27 Feb 2008	Tim Bradstreet cover: 978-0785114178
5	Punisher MAX 5	2007-2008	The Punisher (vol. 7) #50–60	280	3 Jun 2009	Tim Bradstreet cover: 978-0785137825
6	Punisher MAX 6	2008-2010	The Punisher (vol. 7) #61–65; Frank Castle: The Punisher #66–74; Punisher MAX: Force Of Nature; Punisher MAX: Little Black Book	424	8 Jun 2011	Dave Johnson cover: 978-0785156567
	Punisher: Franken-Castle	2009-2010	Dark Reign: The List - Punisher; Punisher (2009) #11–16; Franken-Castle #17–21; Dark Wolverine #88–89	344	17 Nov 2010	Tony Moore cover: 978-0785147541
Miniseries
	Punisher: Born	2003	Punisher: Born #1–4	112	4 Feb 2004	Wiesław Wałkuski cover: 978-0785112310
	Punisher: From First To Last	2006	Punisher: The Tyger; Punisher: The Cell; Punisher: The End	152	4 Feb 2004	Tim Bradstreet cover: 978-0785122760
	Marvel Universe vs. The Punisher	2010	Marvel Universe Vs. The Punisher #1–4	112	22 Dec 2010	Goran Parlov cover: 978-0785143550

=== Runaways ===
#	Title	Years covered	Material collected	Pages	Released	ISBN
1	Runaways Vol. 1	2003-2004	Runaways (2003) #1-18	448	10 Aug 2005	Adrian Alphona cover: 978-0785118763
2	Runaways Vol. 2	2005-2006	Runaways (2005) #1-12; FCBD 2006: X-Men/Runaways	320	6 Dec 2006	Adrian Alphona cover: 978-0785123583
3	Runaways Vol. 3	2006-2007	Runaways (2005) #13-24	296	16 May 2007	Humberto Ramos cover: 978-0785125396

=== S.H.I.E.L.D. ===
Title	Years covered	Material collected	Pages	Released	ISBN
S.H.I.E.L.D.: Architects Of Forever	2010	S.H.I.E.L.D. (2010) #1–6; material from S.H.I.E.L.D. #1 Director's Cut	176	20 Apr 2011	Gerald Parel cover: 978-0785148944
S.H.I.E.L.D.: The Human Machine	2011	S.H.I.E.L.D. (2011) #1–4; S.H.I.E.L.D. by Hickman & Weaver #5–6; S.H.I.E.L.D. Infinity	192	25 Jul 2018	Gerald Parel cover: 978-0785152491

=== Spider-Gwen ===
#	Title	Years covered	Material collected	Pages	Released	ISBN
1	Spider-Gwen Vol. 1	2015-2016	Edge of Spider-Verse #2; All-New Spider-Gwen (vol. 1) #1–5; All-New Spider-Gwen (vol. 2) #1–6	176	1 Feb 2017	Robbi Rodriguez cover: 978-1302903718
2	Spider-Gwen Vol. 2	2016-2017	All-New Spider-Gwen (vol. 2) #7–15; Annual #1; All-New Wolverine Annual #1	264	3 Jan 2018	Robbi Rodriguez cover: 978-1302909000
3	Spider-Gwen Vol. 3	2017-2018	All-New Spider-Gwen (vol. 2) #16–23; Spider-Man (vol. 4) #12–14	248	3 Oct 2018	Robbi Rodriguez cover: 978-1302913694

=== Spider-Man ===
#	Title	Years covered	Material collected	Pages	Released	ISBN
	Complete Frank Miller Spider-Man	1978-1980	Spectacular Spider-Man (vol. 1) #27-28, Amazing Spider-Man Annual #14-15, Marvel Team-Up Annual #4, Marvel Team-Up #100	216	10 Apr 2002	978-0785108993
1	Best of Spider-Man Vol. 1	2001	Amazing Spider-Man (vol. 2) #30–36, Spider-Man's Tangled Web #4–6, Peter Parker: Spider-Man #36, Ultimate Marvel Team-Up #6–8	336	18 Sep 2002	J. Scott Campbell cover: 978-0785109006
2	Best of Spider-Man Vol. 2	2002	Amazing Spider-Man (vol. 2) #37–45, Spider-Man's Tangled Web #10–11, Peter Parker: Spider-Man #44–47	368	Jun 2003	Jason Pearson cover: 978-0785111009
3	Best of Spider-Man Vol. 3	2002-2003	Amazing Spider-Man (vol. 2) #46–58, 500	368	Jun 2004	J. Scott Campbell cover: 978-0785113393
4	Best of Spider-Man Vol. 4	2003-2004	Amazing Spider-Man #501–514	336	Jul 2005	Mike Deodato cover: 978-0785118275
5	Best of Spider-Man Vol. 5	2005	Amazing Spider-Man #515–524	240	Jul 2006	Mike Deodato cover: 978-0785121282
	Spider-Man: The Other	2005-2006	Amazing Spider-Man #525–528; Friendly Neighborhood Spider-Man #1–4; Marvel Knights Spider-Man #19–22	288	25 Oct 2006	Joe Quesada cover: 978-0785121886
Jump To: Civil War
	Civil War: Spider-Man	2006-2007	Friendly Neighborhood Spider-Man #11–16, Amazing Spider-Man #529–538, Sensational Spider-Man #28–34	544	1 Dec 2010	Ron Garney cover: 978-0785148821
	Spider-Man: Back In Black	2007	Amazing Spider-Man #539–543; Friendly Neighborhood Spider-Man #17–23, Annual #1	336	10 Oct 2007	Angel Medina cover: 978-0785129042
	Spider-Island	2011	Amazing Spider-Man #666–673; Venom (2011) #6–8; Spider-Island: Deadly Foes; material from Spider-Island Spotlight; Amazing Spider-Man #659–660, 662–665	392	11 Jan 2012	Humberto Ramos cover: 978-0785151043
	Spider-Island Companion	2011	Spider-Island: I Love New York City, and more: Spider-Island: The Amazing Spider-Girl #1–3; Spider-Island: Cloak & Dagger #1–3; Spider-Island: Deadly Hands Of Kung Fu #1–3; Herc #7–8; Spider-Island: Avengers; Spider-Island: Spider-Woman; Black Panther: The Most Dangerous Man Alive #524; Spider-Island: Heroes For Hire	424	15 Feb 2012	Humberto Ramos cover: 978-0785162285
	Spider-Man: Ends Of The Earth	2012	Amazing Spider-Man #682–687; Amazing Spider-Man: Ends Of The Earth; Avenging Spider-Man #8	192	18 Jul 2012	Stefano Caselli cover: 978-0785160052
1	Superior Spider-Man: Vol. 1	2012-2013	The Amazing Spider-Man #698–700, The Superior Spider-Man #1–5	248	11 Sep 2013	Humberto Ramos cover: 978-0785185215
1	Superior Spider-Man: Vol. 1	2012-2013	The Amazing Spider-Man #698–700, The Superior Spider-Man #1–5	248	11 Sep 2013	Steve Ditko DM cover: 978-0785185222
2	Superior Spider-Man: Vol. 2	2013	The Superior Spider-Man #6–16	248	24 Apr 2014	Giuseppe Camuncoli cover: 978-0785154488
3	Superior Spider-Man: Vol. 3	2013-2014	The Superior Spider-Man #17–31, Annual #1-2	432	18 Mar 2015	Giuseppe Camuncoli cover: 978-0785193951
1	Amazing Spider-Man Vol. 1	2014	Amazing Spider-Man (vol. 3) #1–6, #1.1–1.5, Annual (2014)	272	1 Jan 2016	Alex Ross cover: 978-0785195351
2	Amazing Spider-Man Vol. 2	2014-2015	Amazing Spider-Man (vol. 3) #7–18; Superior Spider-Man #32–33; material from FCBD 2014: Guardians of the Galaxy	352	19 Apr 2016	Giuseppe Camuncoli cover: 978-0785195375
	Spider-Verse	2014-2015	Amazing Spider-Man (vol. 3) #7–15; Superior Spider-Man #32–33, and more: Material from FCBD 2014: Guardians Of The Galaxy, Spider-Verse #1–2; Spider-Verse Team-Up #1–3; Scarlet Spiders #1–3; Spider-Woman (2014) #1–4; Spider-Man 2099 #6–8	648	29 Apr 2015	Olivier Coipel cover: 978-0785190356
1	Amazing Spider-Man Worldwide HC. 1	2015-2016	Amazing Spider-Man (vol. 4) #1–11	280	4 Jan 2017	Alex Ross cover: 978-1302904067
2	Amazing Spider-Man Worldwide HC. 2	2016	Amazing Spider-Man (vol. 4) #12–19; material from FCBD 2015: Amazing Spider-Man and FCBD 2016 (Captain America)	232	6 Sep 2017	Alex Ross cover: 978-1302908423
	Amazing Spider-Man: The Clone Conspiracy	2016-2017	Amazing Spider-Man (vol. 4) #19–24; The Clone Conspiracy #1–5; The Clone Conspiracy: Omega – Silk #14–17; Prowler #1–5; material from FCBD 2016 (Captain America)	512	12 Apr 2017	Gabriele Dell'Otto cover: 978-1302903268
3	Amazing Spider-Man Worldwide HC. 3	2016-2017	Amazing Spider-Man (vol. 4) #20–28, Annual #1	304	1 Jan 2018	Alex Ross cover: 978-1302908911
	Red Goblin	2018	Amazing Spider-Man #794–801, Annual #42	264	19 Sep 2018	Alex Ross cover: 978-1302913540
	Marvel Knights Spider-Man	2004	Marvel Knights Spider-Man #1–12	304	2 Nov 2005	Frank Cho cover: 978-0785118428
	Peter Parker, Spider-Man – Back In Black	2007	Sensational Spider-Man (vol. 2) #35–40, Annual #1; Spider-Man Family #1–2; Marvel Spotlight: Spider-Man; Spider-Man: Back in Black Handbook	336	28 Nov 2007	Angel Medina cover: 978-0785129202
Miniseries
	Amazing Spider-Man 500 Covers	1962-2003	500 covers from Amazing Spider-Man	560	2 Jun 2004	Alex Ross cover: 978-0785114215
1	Spider-Man: The Newspaper Strips Vol. 1	1977-1979	Stan Lee & John Romita Sr. daily and Sunday strips	352	28 Oct 2009	John Romita Sr. cover: 978-0785137931
2	Spider-Man: The Newspaper Strips Vol. 2	1979-1981	Stan Lee & John Romita Sr. daily and Sunday strips	320	3 Aug 2011	John Romita Sr. cover: 978-0785149422
	Spider-Man: The Graphic Novels	1986-1992	Marvel Graphic Novel #22: Amazing Spider-Man: Hooky; #46: Parallel Lives; #63: Spirits Of The Earth; '#72: Fear Itself	280	13 Jun 2012	Charles Vess cover: 978-0785160656
	Spider-Man: Kraven's Last Hunt Deluxe Edition	1987	Amazing Spider-Man #15, 293–294, and more: Web of Spider-Man #31–32; Spectacular Spider-Man #131–132; Marvel Team-Up #128; Amazing Spider-Man: Soul Of The Hunter OGN; What If? (1989) #17; material from Sensational Spider-Man Annual '96; Amazing Spider-Man (vol. 2) #634–637; What The--?! #3	400	8 Aug 2018	Mike Zeck cover: 978-1302911843
	Spider-Man: Blue	2002	Spider-Man: Blue #1–6	160	19 May 2003	Tim Sale cover: 978-0785110620
	Marvel Adventures Spider-Man Vol. 1	2005	Marvel Adventures Spider-Man #1–8	192	Oct 2006	978-0785124320
	Spider-Man / Human Torch	2005	Spider-Man / Human Torch #1–5	128	19 Aug 2009	Paul Smith cover: 978-0785140047
	Spider-Man: The Real Clone Saga	2009	Spider-Man: The Clone Saga (2009) #1–6	144	26 May 2010	Pasqual Ferry cover: 978-0785144243
	Spider-Man/Fantastic Four	2010	Spider-Man/Fantastic Four #1–4; Spectacular Spider-Man #42; Fantastic Four #218	136	9 Feb 2011	Mario Alberti cover: 978-0785146049
	Spider-Man And Wolverine by Wells and Madureira	2011	Avenging Spider-Man #1–3; Savage Wolverine #6–8	160	27 Nov 2013	Joe Madureira cover: 978-0785185079
	Spider-Men	2012	Spider-Men #1–5	128	14 Nov 2012	Jim Cheung cover: 978-0785165330
	Amazing Spider-Man: Family Business	2013	Original Graphic Novel by Mark Waid, James Robinson and Gabrielle Dell'Otto	112	2 Apr 2014	Gabrielle Dell'Otto cover: 978-0785184409
	Amazing Spider-Man: Who Am I?	2014	Amazing Spider-Man: Who Am I? Infinite Comic #1–12	152	18 Feb 2015	Juan Bobillo cover: 978-0785184584
	Amazing Spider-Man: Full Circle	2019	Amazing Spider-Man: Full Circle one-shot	128	15 Jul 2020	Rod Reis cover: 978-1302921385
	Spider-Man/Deadpool by Kelly and McGuinness	2016-2017	Spider-Man/Deadpool #1–5, 8–10, 13–14, 17–18	264	7 Mar 2018	Ed McGuinness cover: 978-1302903725
	Spider-Man: Life Story	2019	Spider-Man: Life Story #1–6, Annual (2021)	240	5 Nov 2019	Chip Zdarsky cover: 978-1302931919
Jump to: Spider-Man Loves Mary-Jane
Jump to: Ultimate Spider-Man

=== Squirrel Girl ===
#	Title	Years covered	Material collected	Pages	Released	ISBN
1	Unbeatable Squirrel Girl Vol. 1	2015	All-New Unbeatable Squirrel Girl (vol. 1) #1–8; material from Marvel Super-Heroes (1990) #8; GLX-Mas Special; Thing (2006) #8; Age Of Heroes #3	248	2 Nov 2016	Erica Henderson cover: 978-1302902247
2	Unbeatable Squirrel Girl Vol. 2	2015-2016	All-New Unbeatable Squirrel Girl (vol. 2) #1–11; All-New Howard The Duck (vol. 2) #6	296	3 May 2017	Erica Henderson cover: 978-1302903732
3	Unbeatable Squirrel Girl Vol. 3	2016-2017	All-New Unbeatable Squirrel Girl (vol. 2) #12–21	256	7 Mar 2018	Erica Henderson cover: 978-1302908447
4	Unbeatable Squirrel Girl Vol. 4	2017-2018	All-New Unbeatable Squirrel Girl (vol. 2) #22–31; material from A Year Of Marvels: The Unbeatable; Not Brand Echh #14	272	23 Jan 2019	Erica Henderson cover: 978-1302915445

=== Thanos ===
#	Title	Years covered	Material collected	Pages	Released	ISBN
	The Thanos Imperative	2010-2011	The Thanos Imperative: Ignition; The Thanos Imperative #1–6; The Thanos Imperative: Devastation; Thanos Sourcebook	248	2 Mar 2011	Aleksi Briclot cover: 978-0785151838
	Thanos Rising	2013	Thanos Rising #1–5	136	2 Jul 2014	Simone Bianchi cover: 978-0785190479
	Thanos: A God Up There Listening	2014	Thanos: A God Up There Listening Infinite Comic #1–6; Thanos Annual #1	120	3 Dec 2014	Dale Keown cover: 978-0785191582
	Thanos by Donny Cates	2017-2018	Thanos (vol. 2) #13–18; Annual #1; Cosmic Ghost Rider #1–5; Thanos Legacy	312	17 Jul 2019	Geoff Shaw cover: 978-1302918033
Original Graphic Novels
1	Thanos: The Infinity Revelation	2014	Original Graphic Novel by Jim Starlin	112	6 Aug 2014	Jim Starlin cover: 978-0785184706
2	Thanos: The Infinity Relativity	2015	Original Graphic Novel by Jim Starlin	112	3 Jun 2015	Jim Starlin cover: 978-0785193036
3	Thanos: The Infinity Finale	2016	Original Graphic Novel by Jim Starlin	112	6 Apr 2016	Jim Starlin cover: 978-0785193050
1	Thanos: The Infinity Siblings	2018	Original Graphic Novel by Jim Starlin and Alan Davis	112	4 Apr 2018	Jim Starlin cover: 978-1302908188
2	Thanos: The Infinity Conflict	2018	Original Graphic Novel by Jim Starlin and Alan Davis	112	14 Nov 2018	Alan Davis cover: 978-1302908140
3	Thanos: The Infinity Ending	2019	Original Graphic Novel by Jim Starlin and Alan Davis	112	2 Oct 2019	Alan Davis cover: 978-1302908164

=== Thor ===
#	Title	Years covered	Material collected	Pages	Released	ISBN
	Tales Of Asgard	2009	Thor: Tales of Asgard by Stan Lee and Jack Kirby #1–6	312	24 Mar 2010	Jack Kirby cover: 978-0785143086
	Tales Of Asgard	2009	Thor: Tales of Asgard by Stan Lee and Jack Kirby #1–6	312	24 Mar 2010	Olivier Coipel DM cover: 978-0785139218
	Astonishing Thor	2011	Astonishing Thor #1–5	120	14 Sep 2011	Mike Choi cover: 978-0785148760
1	Thor: God Of Thunder Vol. 1	2012-2013	Thor: God of Thunder #1–11	272	5 Nov 2014	Esad Ribic cover: 978-0785191131
2	Thor: God Of Thunder Vol. 2	2013-2014	Thor: God of Thunder #12–25	320	1 Jul 2014	Esad Ribic cover: 978-0785198000
1	Thor by Aaron & Dauterman Vol. 1	2014-2015	Thor (vol. 4) #1–8; Annual #1	232	7 Sep 2016	Russell Dauterman cover: 978-1302900670
2	Thor by Aaron & Dauterman Vol. 2	2015-2016	Mighty Thor (vol. 3) #1–12	288	13 Dec 2017	Russell Dauterman cover: 978-1302903800
3	Thor by Aaron & Dauterman Vol. 3	2016-2018	Mighty Thor (vol. 3) #13–23; 700–706; Generations: The Unworthy Thor & The Mighty Thor; Mighty Thor: At The Gates of Valhalla	528	15 May 2019	Russell Dauterman cover: 978-1302917388
4	Thor by Jason Aaron Vol. 4	2018-2019	Thor (vol. 5) #1–11	272	5 Aug 2020	Esad Ribic cover: 978-1302923853
5	Thor by Jason Aaron Vol. 5	2019-2020	Thor (vol. 5) #12–16; King Thor #1–4	232	13 Apr 2022	Michael Del Mundo cover: 978-1302931582
Miniseries
	Thor: Godstorm	2001	Thor: Godstorm #1–3; material from Thor #408–409	128	23 Feb 2011	Steve Rude cover: 978-0785149767
	Thor: Blood Oath	2005	Thor: Blood Oath #1–6	144	22 Mar 2006	Scott Kolins cover: 978-0785122746
	Thor: Ages Of Thunder	2008	Thor: Ages Of Thunder; Thor: Reign Of Blood; Thor: Man Of War; Thor God-Sized Special	160	29 Apr 2009	Marko Djurdjevic cover: 978-0785135678
	Warriors Three: Dog Day Afternoon	2010	Warriors Three #1–4; material from Tales To Astonish #101, Incredible Hulk #102	128	13 Apr 2011	Salva Espin cover: 978-0785153214
	Thor: For Asgard	2010	Thor: For Asgard #1–6	144	4 May 2011	Simone Bianchi cover: 978-0785144458
	Thor: Heaven And Earth	2011	Thor: Heaven And Earth #1–4	112	23 Nov 2011	Ariel Olivetti cover: 978-0785148326

=== Venom ===
#	Title	Years covered	Material collected	Pages	Released	ISBN
	Venom: Circle Of Four	2011	Venom (vol. 2) #10–14, 13.1–13.4	286	23 May 2012	Stefano Caselli cover: 978-0785164500
1	Venom by Donny Cates Vol. 1	2018-2019	Venom (vol. 4 #1–12	280	6 Nov 2019	Ryan Stegman cover: 978-1302919672
2	Venom by Donny Cates Vol. 2	2019-2020	Venom (vol. 4) #16–25	280	3 Feb 2021	Ryan Stegman cover: 978-1302923884
3	Venom by Donny Cates Vol. 3	2020-2021	Venom (vol. 4) #26–35; Spider-Man/Venom FCBD 2020	320	23 Mar 2022	Iban Coello cover: 978-1302931926

=== Wolverine ===
#	Title	Years covered	Material collected	Pages	Released	ISBN
	Wolverine by Claremont and Miller	1982	Wolverine (1982) #1–4; Uncanny X-Men #172–173	144	5 Jun 2013	Frank Miller cover: 978-0785183839
	Best Of Wolverine	1982	Wolverine (1982) #1–4, Incredible Hulk #181, Captain America Annual #8, Uncanny X-Men #205; material from Marvel Comics Presents #72–84	320	13 Oct 2004	Frank Miller cover: 978-0785113706
	Wolverine: Enemy Of The State	2004-2005	Wolverine (2003) #20–32	352	11 Oct 2006	John Romita Jr. cover: 978-0785122067
	Wolverine: Sabretooth	2007	Wolverine (2003) #50–55; Wolverine (1988) #310–313	264	5 Jun 2013	Simone Bianchi cover: 978-0785183853
	Old Man Logan	2008	Wolverine (2003) #66–72, Wolverine: Old Man Logan Giant-Size	224	28 Oct 2009	Steve McNiven cover: 978-0785131595
	Old Man Logan	2008	Wolverine (2003) #66–72, Wolverine: Old Man Logan Giant-Size	224	1 Feb 2017	Steve McNiven cover: 978-1302904630
1	Wolverine by Benjamin Percy Vol. 1	2020-2021	Wolverine (2020) #1–5, 8–12	336	13 Apr 2022	Adam Kubert cover: 978-1302933760
2	Wolverine by Benjamin Percy Vol. 2	2021-2022	Wolverine (2020) #14–25	344	22 Mar 2023	Adam Kubert cover: 978-1302949785
3	Wolverine by Benjamin Percy Vol. 3	2022-2024	Wolverine (2020) #26-32, #33 (a story), #34-35, #37-40	392	26 Jun 2024	Leinil Francis Yu cover: 978-1302955861
Miniseries
1	Wolverine Origin Vol. 1	2001	Origin #1–6	200	5 Jun 2013	Joe Quesada cover: 978-0785183846
2	Wolverine Origin Vol. 2	2013	Origin II #1–5	128	23 Jul 2014	Adam Kubert cover: 978-0785184812
	Origin: The Complete Collection	2001, 2013	Origin #1–6; Origin II #1–5	328	18 Jan 2017	Adam Kubert cover: 978-1302904715
1	Wolverine & Black Cat: Claws Vol. 1	2006	Claws #1–3	104	24 Jan 2007	Joseph Michael Linsner cover: 978-0785118503
2	Wolverine & Black Cat: Claws Vol. 2	2011	Claws 2 #1–3, Killraven (2001) #1	112	24 Jan 2007	Joseph Michael Linsner cover: 978-0785153009
	Marvel Universe vs. Wolverine	2011	Marvel Universe Vs. Wolverine #1–4	112	16 Nov 2011	Michael William Kaluta cover: 978-0785156925
	Spider-Man And Wolverine by Wells and Madureira	2011	Avenging Spider-Man #1–3; Savage Wolverine #6–8	160	27 Nov 2013	Joe Madureira cover: 978-0785185079
	Wolverine: Japan's Most Wanted	2013	Wolverine: Japan's Most Wanted Infinite Comic #1–13	158	19 Mar 2014	Ed McGuinness cover: 978-0785184591
	Death Of Wolverine	2014	Death Of Wolverine #1–4	144	7 Jan 2015	Steve McNiven cover: 978-0785193517
	Hunt For Wolverine	2018	Hunt For Wolverine; Hunt For Wolverine: Weapon Lost #1–4; Hunt For Wolverine: Adamantium Agenda; Hunt For Wolverine: Claws Of A Killer #1–4, Hunt For Wolverine: Mystery In Madripoor #1–4, Hunt For Wolverine: Dead Ends	400	24 Oct 2018	Steve McNiven cover: 978-1302913014
	X Lives & Deaths Of Wolverine	2022	X Lives Of Wolverine #1–5; X Deaths Of Wolverine #1–5	304	20 Jul 2022	Adam Kubert cover: 978-1302931223
	X Lives & Deaths Of Wolverine	2022	X Lives Of Wolverine #1–5; X Deaths Of Wolverine #1–5	304	20 Jul 2022	Mark Brooks DM cover: 978-1302947071

=== X-Force ===
#	Title	Years covered	Material collected	Pages	Released	ISBN
	X-Force: Famous, Mutant & Mortal	2001-2002	X-Force #116–129	352	29 Jan 2003	Mike Allred cover: 978-0785110231
1	X-Force Vol. 1	2008-2009	X-Force (vol. 3) #1–11	264	2 Jun 2010	Clayton Crain cover: 978-0785143239
2	X-Force Vol. 2	2008-2010	X-Force (vol. 3) #12–13, 17–20, Annual #1; X-Force: Sex & Violence #1–3	248	4 Jan 2012	Clayton Crain cover: 978-0785149590
	X-Force/Cable: Messiah War	2009	X-Force (vol. 3) #14–16, X-Men: The Times And Life Of Lucas Bishop #1–3, Cable (2008) #11–15, X-Force/Cable: Messiah War, X-Men: Future History - The Messiah War Sourcebook	360	26 Aug 2009	Ariel Olivetti cover: 978-0785131571
	X-Necrosha	2008-2009	X-Force (vol. 3) #21–25, New Mutants (2009) #6–8, X-Men: Legacy #231–233, Necrosha, Necrosha: The Gathering; material from X-Force (vol. 2) #11, X-Force Annual 2008	424	30 Jun 2010	Adi Granov cover: 978-0785146742
	X-Force: Sex & Violence	2010	X-Force: Sex & Violence #1–3, New X-Men Annual 2001	120	8 Dec 2010	Gabriele Dell'Otto cover: 978-0785149972
1	X-Force by Benjamin Percy Vol. 1	2019-2020	X-Force (vol. 6) #1–12	336	8 Jun 2022	Russell Dauterman cover: 978-1302945077
2	X-Force by Benjamin Percy Vol. 2	2020-2022	X-Force (vol. 6) #15–26, Wolverine (2020) #13	352	31 May 2023	Joshua Cassara cover: 978-1302950026
3	X-Force by Benjamin Percy Vol. 3	2022-2023	X-Force (vol. 6) #27-38	352	26 Jun 2024	Joshua Cassara cover: 978-1302955892
4	X-Force by Benjamin Percy Vol. 4	2023-2024	X-Force (vol. 6) #39-50	336	18 Jun 2025	Joshua Cassara cover: 978-1302961428

=== X-Men ===
#	Title	Years covered	Material collected	Pages	Released	ISBN
	Giant-Size X-Men 40th Anniversary	1975	Giant-Size X-Men #1, 3–4; Classic X-Men #1; X-Men Origins: Colossus; X-Men Origins: Wolverine; X-Men: Deadly Genesis #1–6; What If? (1989) #9, 23; material from X-Men: Gold	440	27 May 2015	Alex Ross cover: 978-0785197775
	X-Men: Dark Phoenix Saga	1979-1980	X-Men #129–138, Phoenix: The Untold Story, What If? (1977) #27; material from Classic X-Men #43, Bizarre Adventures #27	352	28 Jul 2010	John Byrne cover: 978-0785149132
	X-Men: Days Of Future Past	1980	X-Men #141; Uncanny X-Men #142; X-Men Annual #14, Excalibur #52, 66–67; Wolverine: Days Of Future Past #1–3; material from Fantastic Four Annual #23, New Mutants Annual #6, X-Factor Annual #5, Hulk: Broken Worlds #2	392	5 Mar 2014	Terry Austin cover: 978-0785184423
	X-Men: Asgardian Wars	1985-1986	X-Men/Alpha Flight #1–2, New Mutants Special Edition, X-Men Annual #9	232	20 Jan 2010	Arthur Adams cover: 978-0785141488
	X-Men: Mutant Massacre	1986-1987	Uncanny X-Men #210–214, New Mutants #46, X-Factor #9–11, Thor #373–374, Power Pack #27, Daredevil #238	320	6 Jan 2010	John Romita Jr. cover: 978-0785138051
	X-Men: Fall Of The Mutants	1987-1988	Uncanny X-Men #220–227, New Mutants #55–61, X-Factor #18–26, Captain America #339, Daredevil #252, Fantastic Four #312, Incredible Hulk #340, Power Pack #35	824	4 May 2011	Alan Davis cover: 978-0785153122
Jump To: Inferno
	X-Men: X-Tinction Agenda	1988	Uncanny X-Men #235–238, 270–272; New Mutants #95–97, X-Factor #60–62	328	10 Aug 2011	Jim Lee cover: 978-0785155317
	X-Men: Mutant Genesis 2.0	1991-1992	X-Men (1991) #1–7	200	9 May 2012	Jim Lee cover: 978-0785163589
	X-Men: Bishop's Crossing	1991-1992	Uncanny X-Men #281–293, X-Men (1991) #12–13; material from X-Men (1991) #10–11	392	3 Oct 2012	Whilce Portacio cover: 978-0785153498
	X-Men: X-Cutioner's Song	1992-1993	Uncanny X-Men #294–297, X-Factor #84–86, X-Men #14–16, X-Force #16–18, Stryfe's Strike File	368	5 Oct 2011	Andy Kubert cover: 978-0785156109
	X-Men: Shattershot	1993	X-Men (1991) #17–24, X-Men Annual (1992) #1–2, Uncanny X-Men Annual (1992), X-Men: Survival Guide To The Mansion; material from X-Factor Annual #7, X-Force Annual (1992)	616	11 Dec 2019	Jim Lee cover: 978-1302920685
	X-Men: Fatal Attractions	1993	Uncanny X-Men #298–305, 315, Annual #17; X-Factor #87–92; X-Men Unlimited #1–2; X-Force #25; X-Men #25; Wolverine #75; Excalibur #71	816	18 Apr 2012	John Romita Jr. cover: 978-0785162452
	X-Men: The Wedding Of Cyclops And Phoenix	1994	Uncanny X-Men #307–310; X-Men (1991) #26–35; Avengers #368–369; Avengers West Coast #101; Cable #6–8, X-Men Unlimited (1993) #3; Uncanny X-Men Annual #18; X-Men: The Wedding Album; What If? (1989) #60; Adventures of Cyclops & Phoenix #1–4; material from Marvel Valentine Special	832	5 Sep 2018	Andy Kubert cover: 978-1302913229
	X-Men: Phalanx Covenant	1993-1994	Uncanny X-Men #306, 311–314, 316–317; X-Men (1991) #36–37; X-Factor #106; X-Force #38; Wolverine #85; Cable #16; Excalibur #78–82	552	5 Feb 2014	Andy Kubert cover: 978-0785185499
	X-Men: Legionquest	1994-1995	Uncanny X-Men #318–321; X-Men (1991) #38–41; X-Factor #107–109, Cable #20; X-Men Unlimited #4–7; X-Men Annual #3	592	11 Apr 2018	Andy Kubert cover: 978-1302910389
	X-Men: Operation Zero Tolerance	1997	Uncanny X-Men #346; Generation X #26–31; X-Force #67–70; X-Men (1991) #65–70; Wolverine #115–118; Cable #45–47; X-Man #30	640	1 Aug 2012	Leinil Francis Yu cover: 978-0785162407
	X-Men: Eve Of Destruction	2000	Magneto: Dark Seduction #1–4; Uncanny X-Men #390–393, Annual 2000; X-Men (1991) #110–113; X-Men Forever (2001) #1–6; X-Men: Declassified; X-Men Unlimited (1993) #30–33; X-Men: The Search For Cyclops #1–4	808	26 Jun 2019	Ian Churchill cover: 978-1302918255
1	New X-Men Vol. 1	2001-2002	New X-Men (2001) #114–126, New X-Men Annual 2001	384	23 Oct 2002	Frank Quitely cover: 978-0785109648
2	New X-Men Vol. 2	2002-2003	New X-Men (2001) #127–141	368	29 Sep 2003	Frank Quitely cover: 978-0785111184
3	New X-Men Vol. 3	2003-2004	New X-Men (2001) #142–154	336	11 Aug 2004	Phil Jimenez cover: 978-0785112006
1	Astonishing X-Men Vol. 1	2004-2006	Astonishing X-Men (vol. 3) #1–12; Giant-Size Astonishing X-Men #1	320	26 Apr 2008	John Cassaday cover: 978-0785117339
1	Astonishing X-Men Vol. 1	2004-2006	Astonishing X-Men (vol. 3) #1–12; Giant-Size Astonishing X-Men #1	320	26 Apr 2008	Book Market cover: 978-0785123019
2	Astonishing X-Men Vol. 2	2006-2008	Astonishing X-Men (vol. 3) #13–24; Giant-Size Astonishing X-Men #1	344	3 Dec 2008	Book Market cover: 978-0785122531
2	Astonishing X-Men Vol. 2	2006-2008	Astonishing X-Men (vol. 3) #13–24; Giant-Size Astonishing X-Men #1	344	3 Dec 2008	John Cassaday DM cover: 978-0785135616
Jump To: House Of M
Jump To: Civil War
	X-Men: Rise & Fall of the Shi'Ar Empire	2006-2007	Uncanny X-Men #475–486	272	25 Jul 2007	Billy Tan cover: 978-0785125150
	X-Men: Supernovas	2006-2007	X-Men (1991) #188–199; X-Men Annual #1	336	8 Aug 2007	Ben Steeves cover: 978-0785125143
	Endangered Species	2007	X-Men: Endangered Species; material from Uncanny X-Men #488–491, X-Men (1991) #200–204, New X-Men (2004) #40–42, X-Factor (2006) #21–24	192	30 Jan 2008	Marc Silvestri cover: 978-0785130123
	Messiah Complex	2007	X-Men: Messiah Complex; Uncanny X-Men #492–494; X-Men #205–207; New X-Men #44–46; X-Factor #25–27	352	30 Apr 2008	Marc Silvestri cover: 978-0785128991
	Uncanny X-Men: Manifest Destiny	2008	Uncanny X-Men #500–503; FCBD 2008 X-Men; X-Men: Manifest Destiny: Dazzler; Karma; Mercury/X-23; Colossus; Emma Frost; Graymalkin, Juggernaut	200	8 Apr 2009	Alex Ross cover: 978-0785138181
	X-Men: Manifest Destiny	2008	Wolverine: Manifest Destiny #1–4, X-Men: Manifest Destiny: Iceman; Nightcrawler, Boom-Boom & Avalanche	192	13 May 2009	Michael Turner cover: 978-0785138181
	X-Men: Worlds Apart	2008-2009	X-Men: Worlds Apart #1–4, Black Panther (1998) #26; material from Marvel Team-Up #100	152	27 May 2009	J. Scott Campbell cover: 978-0785140306
	X-Infernus	2008–2009	X-Infernus #1–4, X-Infernus Saga; material from New X-Men #7, X-Men: Divided We Stand #2, X-Men Unlimited #14	152	17 Jun 2010	David Finch cover: 978-0785139478
Jump To: Avengers/X-Men Utopia
	Nation X	2009–2010	Uncanny X-Men #515–522, Dark Reign: The List - X-Men; Nation X #1–4	344	19 May 2010	Alan Davis cover: 978-0785138730
	X-Men: Second Coming	2010	Second Coming #1–2; Second Coming: Prepare; Uncanny X-Men #523–525; New Mutants (2009) #12–14; X-Men Legacy #235–237; X-Force (2008) #26–28	344	29 Sep 2010	David Finch cover: 978-0785150077
	X-Men: Second Coming: Revelations	2010	Cable: Hope; X-Men: Blind Science; X-Men: Hellbound #1–3; X-Factor #204–206	200	13 Oct 2010	David Finch cover: 978-0785150077
	Age Of X	2011	X-Men Legacy #245–247, Age Of X Alpha, New Mutants (2009) #22–24, Age of X Universe #1–2, Age of X Historical Logs	256	22 Jun 2011	Leinil Francis Yu cover: 978-0785152897
	X-Men: Schism	2011	X-Men: Schism #1–5, Generation Hope #10–11, X-Men: Regenesis	224	28 Dec 2011	Alan Davis cover: 978-0785156680
	Astonishing X-Men: Northstar	2012	Astonishing X-Men (2004) #48–51, Alpha Flight #106; material from Nation X #2	136	22 Aug 2012	Dustin Weaver cover: 978-0785161790
	Astonishing X-Men: Northstar	2012	Astonishing X-Men (2004) #48–51, Alpha Flight #106; material from Nation X #2	136	22 Aug 2012	Marko Djurdjevic DM cover: 978-0785166429
Jump To: Avengers vs. X-Men
1	All-New X-Men Vol. 1	2013	All-New X-Men (vol. 1) #1–10	272	1 Oct 2014	Stuart Immonen cover: 978-0785191155
2	All-New X-Men Vol. 2	2013-2014	All-New X-Men (vol. 1) #11–15, 18–21; X-Men: Gold	272	2 Sep 2015	Stuart Immonen cover: 978-0785198222
3	All-New X-Men Vol. 3	2014	All-New X-Men (vol. 1) #22–30, 18–21; Guardians Of The Galaxy (2013) #11–13	288	2 Dec 2015	Stuart Immonen cover: 978-0785198239
4	All-New X-Men Vol. 4	2014-2015	All-New X-Men (vol. 1) #31–41	288	4 May 2016	Stuart Immonen cover: 978-0785199892
	Guardians Of The Galaxy/X-Men: The Black Vortex	2014	The Black Vortex: Alpha; The Black Vortex: Omega; Guardians Of The Galaxy (2013) #24–25; Legendary Star-Lord #9–11; All-New X-Men #38–39; Guardians Team-Up #3; Nova #28; Cyclops #12; Captain Marvel #14	312	1 Jul 2015	Ed McGuinness cover: 978-0785197706
Jump To: Avengers & X-Men AXIS
1	Uncanny X-Men Vol. 1	2013-2014	Uncanny X-Men (vol. 3) #1–11, 14, 15.INH, 16–18	360	2 Feb 2016	Chris Bachalo cover: 978-0785195320
	X-Men: Battle Of The Atom	2013	All-New X-Men (vol. 1) #16–17, Uncanny X-Men (vol. 3) #12–13, X-Men: Battle Of The Atom #1–2, X-Men (vol. 4) #5–6, Wolverine & the X-Men #36–37	248	8 Jan 2014	Arthur Adams cover: 978-0785189060
2	Uncanny X-Men Vol. 2	2014-2015	Uncanny X-Men (vol. 3) #19–35, 600, Annual #1, All-New X-Men Annual #1	496	6 Dec 2016	Chris Bachalo cover: 978-1302901714
Jump To: Original Sin
	X-Men: No More Humans	2014	Original Graphic Novel by Mike Carey and Salvador Larroca	128	7 May 2014	Salvador Larroca cover: 978-0785154020
	X-Men: Apocalypse Wars	2016	All-New X-Men (vol. 2) #9–11, Extraordinary X-Men #8–12, Uncanny X-Men (vol. 4) #6–10	328	28 Sep 2016	Paco Medina cover: 978-1302902452
	Uncanny X-Men Disassembled	2018	Uncanny X-Men (vol. 5) #1–10	272	3 Feb 2021	Leinil Francis Yu cover: 978-1302915018
	House Of X/Powers Of X	2019	House Of X #1–6; Powers Of X #1–6	448	11 Dec 2019	Pepe Larraz cover: 978-1302915704
	House Of X/Powers Of X	2019	House Of X #1–6; Powers Of X #1–6	448	18 Nov 2025	Pepe Larraz cover: 978-1302966973
	House Of X/Powers Of X	2019	House Of X #1–6; Powers Of X #1–6	448	18 Nov 2025	Mark Brooks DM cover: 978-1302966980
	X Of Swords	2020-2021	X of Swords: Creation; X of Swords: Stasis; X of Swords: Destruction; X-Men (2019) #12–15; Excalibur (2019) #13–15; Marauders (2019) #13-15, X-Force (2019) #13-14; New Mutants (2019) #13; Wolverine (2020) #6-7; Cable (2020) #5-6; Hellions (2020) #5-6; X-Factor (2020) #4	720	3 Mar 2021	Pepe Larraz cover: 978-1302927172
	X Of Swords	2020-2021	X of Swords: Creation; X of Swords: Stasis; X of Swords: Destruction; X-Men (2019) #12–15; Excalibur (2019) #13–15; Marauders (2019) #13-15, X-Force (2019) #13-14; New Mutants (2019) #13; Wolverine (2020) #6-7; Cable (2020) #5-6; Hellions (2020) #5-6; X-Factor (2020) #4	720	3 Mar 2021	Mark Brooks DM cover: 978-1302928872
	X Of Swords	2020-2021	X of Swords: Creation; X of Swords: Stasis; X of Swords: Destruction; X-Men (2019) #12–15; Excalibur (2019) #13–15; Marauders (2019) #13-15, X-Force (2019) #13-14; New Mutants (2019) #13; Wolverine (2020) #6-7; Cable (2020) #5-6; Hellions (2020) #5-6; X-Factor (2020) #4	720	2 Feb 2027	Pepe Larraz cover: 978-1302970888
	X-Men: Hellfire Gala: Red Carpet Edition	2021	X-Men (2019) #21; X-Force (2019) #20; New Mutants (2019) #19; X-Factor (2020) #10, Planet-Size X-Men (2021) #1, and more: Marauders (2019) #21; Excalibur (2019) #21; Hellions (2020) #12; S.W.O.R.D. (2020) #6; Way of X #3; X-Corp #2; Wolverine (2020) #13	400	14 Dec 2021	Pepe Larraz cover: 978-0785109822
	X-Men: Hellfire Gala: Red Carpet Edition	2021	X-Men (2019) #21; X-Force (2019) #20; New Mutants (2019) #19; X-Factor (2020) #10, Planet-Size X-Men (2021) #1, and more: Marauders (2019) #21; Excalibur (2019) #21; Hellions (2020) #12; S.W.O.R.D. (2020) #6; Way of X #3; X-Corp #2; Wolverine (2020) #13	400	14 Dec 2021	Russell Dauterman DM cover: 978-1302931568
	Inferno by Jonathan Hickman	2021	Inferno (2021) #1–4	224	26 Apr 2022	Jerome Opena cover: 978-0785109822
	Inferno by Jonathan Hickman	2021	Inferno (2021) #1–4	224	26 Apr 2022	Mark Brooks DM cover: 978-1302946302
Miniseries
	X4	2004-2005	X-Men/Fantastic Four (2005) #1–5	120	22 Jun 2005	Pat Lee cover: 978-0785115205
	X-Men: First Class - Tomorrow's Brightest	2006	X-Men: First Class #1–8	184	20 Jun 2007	Marko Djurdjevic cover: 978-0785124269
	Inhumans vs. X-Men	2017	Inhumans vs. X-Men #0–6	208	5 Jul 2017	Leinil Francis Yu cover: 978-1302906535
1	X-Men Origins	2008-2009	X-Men Origins: Beast; X-Men Origins: Colossus; X-Men Origins: Gambit; X-Men Origins: Jean Grey; X-Men Origins: Sabretooth; X-Men Origins: Wolverine	144	23 Sep 2009	Mark Texeira cover: 978-0785134510
2	X-Men Origins II	2009-2010	X-Men Origins: Cyclops; X-Men Origins: Deadpool; X-Men Origins: Emma Frost; X-Men Origins: Iceman; X-Men Origins: Nightcrawler; material from Giant-Size X-Men #1; X-Men #131	176	16 Mar 2011	Benjamin Zhang Bin cover: 978-0785151586
	X-Men/Spider-Man	2009	X-Men/Spider-Man #1-4; X-Men #35	128	24 Jun 2009	Mario Alberti cover: 978-0785139539
	X-Men/Steve Rogers: Escape From The Negative Zone	2011	Uncanny X-Men Annual #3, Steve Rogers: Super-Soldier Annual, Namor: The First Mutant Annual	112	20 Jul 2011	Nick Bradshaw cover: 978-0785155607
	Sins Of Sinister	2023	Sins Of Sinister; Immoral X-Men #1-3; Storm & The Brotherhood Of Mutants #1-3, Nightcrawlers #1-3, Sins Of Sinister Dominion	344	20 Sep 2023	Leinil Francis Yu cover: 978-1302950828

=== Young Avengers ===
Title	Years covered	Material collected	Pages	Released	ISBN
Young Avengers	2005-2006	Young Avengers (2005) #1–12, Young Avengers Special	336	30 Jan 2008	Jim Cheung cover: 978-0785130338
Avengers: The Children's Crusade	2010	Avengers: The Children's Crusade #1–9; Avengers: The Children's Crusade - Young Avengers; material from Uncanny X-Men #526	248	14 Mar 2012	Jim Cheung cover: 978-0785136385

=== Anthologies ===
These books feature comics previously published within the Earth-616 universe, but grouped outside of a single character, or team.

#	Title	Years covered	Material collected	Pages	Released	ISBN
	Marvel Legacy	2017	Marvel Legacy one-shot; Marvel Legacy primer pages; FOOM Magazine	512	21 Feb 2018	Joe Quesada cover: 978-1302911010
	The A-Z of Marvel Monsters	1959-1960	Tales To Astonish #15–16, 22; Tales Of Suspense #13, 18, 23; Journey Into Mystery #57, 62; Kirby Monster Variant Cover collection	128	19 Jul 2017	Mike Del Mundo cover: 978-1302908638
	Marvel Monsters	1960s	Material from Tales To Astonish #1, 10; Journey Into Mystery #62; Strange Tales #89; Marvel Monsters: From The Monster Files Of Ulysses Bloodstone And The Monster Hunters	200	8 Feb 2006	Eric Powell cover: 978-0785121411
	Legion Of Monsters	1970s	Material from Marvel Premiere #28; Marvel Spotlight #26; Marvel Two-in-One #18; Dead Of Night #11	280	24 Oct 2007	Greg Land cover: 978-0785127543
	Marvel Visionaries: Chris Claremont	1970s-1980s	Avengers Annual #10; Daredevil #102; Excalibur #16; Iron Fist #14; New Mutants #21; X-Men (1963) #137; Uncanny X-Men #153, 205, 268; Uncanny X-Men Annual #12; Wolverine #3; material from Classic X-Men #12; Marvel Preview #11; X-Men Unlimited #36	376	24 Aug 2005	John Byrne cover: 978-0785118879
1	Marvel Visionaries: Jack Kirby Vol. 1	1940s-1960s	Avengers #4; Captain America #200; Eternals #7; Fantastic Four #48–51; Incredible Hulk #3; Sgt. Fury #6; Thor #134–136; What If? #11; Yellow Claw #3; material from Amazing Adventures (1961) #1; Amazing Adventures (1970) #1–2; Amazing Spider-Man #8; Captain America Comics #1; Fantastic Four Annual #5; Rawhide Kid #17; Red Raven Comics #1; Strange Tales #94	336	27 Oct 2004	Jack Kirby cover: 978-0785115748
2	Marvel Visionaries: Jack Kirby Vol. 2	1940s-1960s	Devil Dinosaur #1; Fantastic Four #57–60; Sgt. Fury #13; Thor #154–157; X-Men #9; Yellow Claw #4; material from Captain America Comics #1; Love Romances #103; Marvel Mystery Comics #23; Not Brand Echh #1; Strange Tales #89, 114; Tales of Suspense #59; Two-Gun Kid #60	344	22 Mar 2006	Jack Kirby cover: 978-0785120940
	Marvel Visionaries: John Buscema	1960s-1970s	Avengers #41–42, 75–76, 277; Fantastic Four #111–112; Marvel Spotlight #30; Silver Surfer #4; Thor #200; Wolverine (1988) #10; material from Dracula Lives #3; My Love #2; Strange Tales #22, 150; Tales to Astonish #85–87	368	17 Jan 2007	John Buscema cover: 978-0785121619
	Marvel Visionaries: John Romita Jr.	1980s-2000s	Amazing Spider-Man #229–230; Annual #11; Amazing Spider-Man (vol. 2) #36; Daredevil #253; Daredevil: The Man Without Fear #1–2; Incredible Hulk (2000) #25, 34; Iron Man #128, 256; Punisher War Zone #1; Star Brand #1; Uncanny X-Men #183, 309	360	26 Oct 2005	John Romita Jr. cover: 978-0785119647
	Marvel Visionaries: John Romita Sr.	1950s-1960s	Amazing Spider-Man #39–40, 42, 50, 108–109, 365; Captain America And The Falcon #138; Daredevil #16–17; Fantastic Four #105–106; Untold Tales of Spider-Man #-1; material from Menace #11; Strange Tales #4; Tales of Suspense #77; Tales to Astonish #77; Vampire Tales #2; Young Men #24	336	3 Aug 2005	John Romita Sr. cover: 978-0785117803
	Marvel Visionaries: Roy Thomas	1960s	Avengers #35, 57–58, 100; Captain Marvel #19; Doctor Strange: Sorcerer Supreme #9; Fantastic Four #119, 176; Giant-Size Invaders #1; Incredible Hulk #147; Sub-Mariner #8, 14; X-Men #64; material from Amazing Adventures #8; Chamber of Darkness #8; Dracula Lives #1; Modeling With Millie #44; Not Brand Echh #12; Tales of Suspense #73	352	1 Feb 2006	Roy Thomas cover: 978-0785120889
	Marvel Visionaries: Stan Lee	1940s-1960s	Amazing Spider-Man #33, 96–98; Annual #1; Captain America #110; Daredevil #7, 47; Fantastic Four #11; Annual #3; Marvel Premiere #3; Silver Surfer #5; Spectacular Spider-Man Super Special (1995) #1; Thor #179–181; material from Captain America Comics #3, 16	336	2 Feb 2005	John Romita Sr. cover: 978-0785116936
	Marvel Visionaries: Steve Ditko	1950s-1960s	Amazing Spider-Man #1, 31–33; Annual #1; Daredevil #162; Incredible Hulk #6; Incredible Hulk #249; Speedball #1; material from Amazing Adult Fantasy #7, 10, 12, 13; Marvel Super-Heroes #8; Strange Tales #97, 110, 115, 126–127, 146; Tales of Suspense #48; Tales to Astonish #26, 42	344	20 Apr 2005	Steve Ditko cover: 978-0785117834
	The World Outside Your Window		Amazing Spider-Man #97; Howard The Duck (1976) #8; Iron Man #128; New Mutants #45; Alpha Flight #106; Uncanny X-Men (1981) #303; Incredible Hulk #420; Amazing Spider-Man (vol. 2) #36; Captain America (2002) #1; Astonishing X-Men (2004) #51; Ms. Marvel (2015) #13; Champions (2016) #24; Material From Captain America Comics #2; Amazing Spider-Man (vol. 2) #583	320	26 Jun 2019	Stephane Roux cover: 978-1302918729
	Yellow, Blue & Gray by Jeph Loeb and Tim Sale	2001-2004	Daredevil: Yellow #1–6; Spider-Man: Blue #1–6; Hulk: Gray #1–6	540	19 Aug 2014	Tim Sale cover: 978-0785188315

=== Miniseries ===
These books feature characters or teams that rarely have an ongoing series; or other content from the primary Earth-616 universe that doesn't neatly fit into another category.

#	Title	Years covered	Material collected	Pages	Released	ISBN
	Annihilation Classic	1959-1997	Bug #1; Nova #1; Quasar #1; Rocket Raccoon #1–4; Marvel Spotlight #6 (Captain Universe); Marvel Premiere #1 (Warlock); material from Logan's Run #6 (Thanos); Tales To Astonish #13 (Groot)	240	8 Oct 2008	Derec Aucoin cover: 978-0785133889
	Annihilators	2011	Annihilators #1-4	184	31 Aug 2011	Alex Garner cover: 978-0785160403
	Annihilators	2011	Annihilators #1-4	184	31 Aug 2011	Skottie Young DM cover: 978-0785160663
	Beyond!	2006	Beyond! #1–6	144	28 Feb 2007	978-0785126249
	Dark Reign: The List	2009	Dark Reign: The List - Daredevil; Avengers; X-Men; Hulk; Secret Warriors; Wolverine; Punisher; Amazing Spider-Man	232	20 Jan 2010	Brandon Peterson cover: 978-0785142362
	Doomwar	2010	Doomwar #1–6	144	27 Oct 2010	John Romita Jr. cover: 978-0785147145
	Fury MAX: My War Gone By	2012	Fury MAX #1–13	312	6 Aug 2014	Dave Johnson cover: 978-0785190387
	Generations	2017	Generations: Banner Hulk & Totally Awesome Hulk; Generations: Captain Marvel & Captain Mar-Vell: Generations: Captain Marvel & Ms. Marvel; Generations: Hawkeye & Hawkeye; Generations: Iron Man & Ironheart; Generations: Miles Morales Spider-Man & Peter Parker Spider-Man; Generations: Phoenix & Jean Grey; Generations: Sam Wilson Captain America & Steve Rogers Captain America; Generations: Unworthy Thor & Mighty Thor; Generations: Wolverine & All-New Wolverine	328	22 Nov 2017	Alex Ross cover: 978-1302908478
	Giant-Size Little Marvel: AvX	2015	Giant-Size Little Marvel: AVX #1–4; A-Babies vs. X-Babies	120	3 Feb 2016	Skottie Young cover: 978-0785198703
	Girl Comics	2010	Girl Comics #1-3	120	22 Sep 2010	Amanda Conner & Laura Martin cover: 978-0785147923
	Heralds	2010	Heralds #1-5	120	29 Sep 2010	Jelena Kevic Djurdjevic cover: 978-0785143253
1	Lockjaw And The Pet Avengers	2009	Lockjaw and the Pet Avengers #1–4; Tails of the Pet Avengers; Marvel Pets Handbook	176	21 Oct 2009	Karl Kerschl cover: 978-0785142713
2	Lockjaw And The Pet Avengers Unleashed	2010	Lockjaw and the Pet Avengers Unleashed #1–4; Tails of the Pet Avengers: The Dogs of Summer	120	15 Sep 2010	Chris Sotomayor cover: 978-0785143048
	Marvel Comics: #1000	2019	Marvel Comics #1000–1001	144	28 Aug 2019	Alex Ross cover: 978-1302921378
	Mystic Arcana	2007	Mystic Arcana: Magik; Mystic Arcana: Scarlet Witch; Mystic Arcana: Black Knight; Mystic Arcana: Sister Grimm; The Official Tarot of the Marvel Universe	264	12 Dec 2012	Marko Djurdjevic cover: 978-0785127192
	Mythos	2008	Mythos: Captain America; Mythos: X-Men; Mythos: Ghost Rider; Mythos: Hulk; Mythos: Spider-Man; Mythos: Fantastic Four	152	12 Nov 2008	Paolo Rivera cover: 978-0785115977
	Power Pack: The Kids Are All Right	2005-2006	Power Pack #1–4; Avengers And Power Pack Assemble! #1–4; X-Men And Power Pack #1–4	280	9 Jul 2008	Gurihiru cover 978-0785129158
	Shattered Heroes	2012	Fear Itself #7.1; Captain America, Fear Itself (2012) #7.2; Thor, Fear Itself (2012) #7.3; Iron Man, Point One	128	28 Mar 2012	978-0785163459
	Stan Lee Meets The Marvel Universe	2006-2007	Stan Lee Meets: Dr. Strange; Stan Lee Meets: Spider-Man; Stan Lee Meets: Silver Surfer; Stan Lee Meets: Thing; Stan Lee Meets: Dr. Doom	240	14 Mar 2007	978-0785122722
1	Strange Tales Vol. 1	2009	Strange Tales (vol. 5) #1–3; The Megalomaniacal Spider-Man; material from All Select Comics 70th Anniversary Special	200	3 Mar 2010	Chip Kidd cover: 978-0785146261
2	Strange Tales Vol. 2	2010	Strange Tales II #1–3	152	30 Mar 2011	Rafael Gramp cover: 978-0785148227
	Timestorm 2009-2099	2009	Timestorm 2009–2099 #1–4; Timestorm 2009–2099: X-Men; Timestorm 2009–2099: Spider-Man	144	4 Nov 2009	Paul Renaud cover: 978-0785139225
	The Twelve	2008-2009	The Twelve #1–12; The Twelve: Spearhead	328	24 Apr 2013	Kaare Andrews cover: 978-0785127154
	Vengeance	2010-2011	Vengeance #1-6	144	15 Feb 2012	Gabriele Dell'Otto cover: 978-0785157632
	Vision	2015-2016	Vision (vol. 2) #1–12; material from Vision Director's Cut #1-6	488	10 Jan 2018	Mike Del Mundo cover: 978-1302908539
	NYX/X-23: Innocence Lost	2003-2005	NYX #1–7, X-23 #1–6	352	2 Nov 2018	Billy Tan cover: 978-0785118251

== Event OHCs ==
Marvel's first major line-wide event was Marvel Super Heroes Secret Wars in 1984. The event "capitalized on the success of previous crossovers to make an epic storyline involving most of the Marvel Universe". By the mid-2000s, large comics events had become an annual tradition for Marvel, with Avengers Disassembled (2004), House of M (2005), Civil War (2006–2007), and Secret Invasion (2008) providing enormous sales success. After initial trade paperback reprints, these all had premium oversized hardcover releases.

=== Age Of Ultron ===
Title	Years covered	Material collected	Pages	Released	ISBN
Age Of Ultron	2013	Age of Ultron #1-10, 10AI; Avengers Assemble #14AU–15AU; Fantastic Four (2012) #5AU; Fearless Defenders #4AU; Superior Spider-Man #6AU; Ultron #1AU; Uncanny Avengers #8AU; Wolverine & the X-Men #27AU	288	17 Sep 2013	Bryan Hitch cover: 978-0785155652

=== Annihilation ===
#	Title	Years covered	Material collected	Pages	Released	ISBN
1	Annihilation Vol. 1	2005-2006	Drax The Destroyer #1–4; Annihilation Prologue; Nova #1–6	244	21 Feb 2007	Gabriele Dell'Otto cover: 978-0785125112
2	Annihilation Vol. 2	2005-2006	Silver Surfer #1–4; Super-Skrull #1–4; Ronan The Accuser #1–4	312	18 Apr 2007	Gabriele Dell'Otto cover: 978-0785125129
3	Annihilation Vol. 3	2006	Annihilation #1–6; Annihilation: Heralds Of Galactus #1–2; Annihilation: The Nova Corps Files Handbook	304	27 Jun 2007	Gabriele Dell'Otto cover: 978-0785125136
1	Annihilation Conquest Vol. 1	2007	Annihilation: Conquest Prologue; Quasar #1–4; Starlord #1–4; Annihilation Saga	272	23 Jan 2008	Aleksi Briclot cover: 978-0785127826
2	Annihilation Conquest Vol. 2	2007	Wraith #1–4; Nova (vol. 4) #4–7; Annihilation: Conquest #1–6	344	9 Jul 2008	Aleksi Briclot cover: 978-0785127161
	Nova: Annihilation	2007-2008	Nova (vol. 4) #1–12; Annual #1	328	10 Dec 2008	Adi Granov cover: 978-0785136545

=== Avengers & X-Men: AXIS ===
Title	Years covered	Material collected	Pages	Released	ISBN
Avengers & X-Men: Axis	2014	Avengers & X-Men: Axis #1–9	264	25 Feb 2015	Jim Cheung cover: 978-0785190950

=== Avengers vs. X-Men ===
Title	Years covered	Material collected	Pages	Released	ISBN
Avengers vs. X-Men	2012	Avengers Vs. X-Men #0–12; AVX: VS. #1–6; Avengers Vs. X-Men: Infinite #1, 6, 10	568	21 Nov 2012	Jim Cheung cover: 978-0785163176
Avengers vs. X-Men	2012	Avengers Vs. X-Men #0–12; AVX: VS. #1–6; Avengers Vs. X-Men: Infinite #1, 6, 10	568	21 Nov 2012	Nick Bradshaw DM cover: 978-0785165859
Avengers vs. X-Men Companion	2012	Avengers (2010) #25–30, New Avengers (2010) #24–30, and more: Avengers Academy #29–33, Secret Avengers (2010) #26–28, X-Men Legacy (2008) #266–270, Wolverine & the X-Men #9–16, #18; AVX: Consequences #1–5, Uncanny X-Men (2012) #11–20; A-Babies Vs. X-Babies #1	1,112	21 May 2013	978-0785168515

=== Avengers/X-Men Utopia ===
Title	Years covered	Material collected	Pages	Released	ISBN
Avengers/X-Men: Utopia	2009	Dark Avengers/Uncanny X-Men: Utopia; Dark Avengers/Uncanny X-Men: Exodus, and more: Uncanny X-Men #513–514; Dark Avengers #7–8; Dark X-Men: The Beginning #1–3; X-Men Legacy #226–227; Dark X-Men: The Confession; material from Dark Reign: The Cabal	336	11 Nov 2009	Marc Silvestri cover: 978-0785142331

=== Blood Hunt ===
Title	Years covered	Material collected	Pages	Released	ISBN
Blood Hunt Red Band Edition	2024	Blood Hunt: Red Band #1-5; FCBD 2024: Blood Hunt/X-Men	160	5 Aug 2025	Pepe Larraz cover: 978-1302958534

=== Civil War ===
Title	Years covered	Material collected	Pages	Released	ISBN
Civil War	2006-2007	Civil War #1–7; Marvel Spotlight: Civil War; Daily Bugle Civil War Newspaper Special; Civil War Script Book	512	12 Nov 2008	Steve McNiven cover: 978-0785121787
Civil War	2006-2007	Civil War #1–7; Marvel Spotlight: Civil War; Daily Bugle Civil War Newspaper Special; Civil War Script Book	512	12 Nov 2008	Michael Turner DM cover: 978-0785134831
Civil War	2006-2007	Civil War #1–7; Marvel Spotlight: Civil War; Daily Bugle Civil War Newspaper Special; Civil War Script Book	512	6 Apr 2016	Steve McNiven cover: 978-0785194484
Civil War	2006-2007	Civil War #1–7; Marvel Spotlight: Civil War; Daily Bugle Civil War Newspaper Special; Civil War Script Book	512	6 Apr 2016	Movie DM cover: 978-1302900199
Civil War: Avengers	2006-2007	New Avengers: Illuminati; New Avengers #21–25; Ms. Marvel #6–8; Iron Man/Captain America: Casualties of War; Iron Man #13–14; Winter Soldier: Winter Kills; Captain America #22–25; Civil War: The Confession; Civil War: The Initiative; Civil War Fallen Son Daily Bugle Special	552	12 Sep 2010	Adi Granov cover: 978-0785148807
Civil War: Fantastic Four	2006-2007	Fantastic Four #536–543; Black Panther #18–25; She-Hulk #8; Civil War: Young Avengers/Runaways #1–4	536	6 Oct 2010	Adi Granov cover: 978-0785148814
Civil War: Front Line	2006-2007	Civil War: Front Line #1–11; Civil War: Choosing Sides; Civil War: The Return	440	27 Oct 2010	John Watson cover: 978-0785149491
Civil War: Spider-Man	2006-2007	Amazing Spider-Man #529–538; Sensational Spider-Man #28–34; Friendly Neighborhood Spider-Man #11–16	544	1 Dec 2010	Ron Garney cover: 978-0785148821
Civil War: Underside	2006-2007	Thunderbolts #103–105; Moon Knight #7–12; Heroes For Hire #1–3; Civil War: War Crimes; Punisher War Journal #1–3; Ghost Rider #8–11	512	29 Dec 2010	David Finch cover: 978-0785148838
Civil War: X-Men	2006-2007	Wolverine #42–48; X-Factor #8–9; Cable & Deadpool #30–32; Civil War: X-Men #1–4; Blade #5; Civil War Files; Civil War: Battle Damage Report	520	2 Feb 2011	Humberto Ramos cover: 978-0785148845

=== Civil War II ===
Title	Years covered	Material collected	Pages	Released	ISBN
Civil War II	2016	Civil War II #0–8; material from FCBD 2016: Civil War II	296	1 Feb 2017	Marko Djurdjevic cover: 978-1302901561

=== House Of M ===
Title	Years covered	Material collected	Pages	Released	ISBN
House Of M	2005	House of M #1–8; The Pulse: House of M Special; Secrets Of The House of M	312	16 Jan 2008	Esad Ribic cover: 978-0785124665
House Of M: Spider-Man, Fantastic Four & X-Men	2005	Spider-Man: House of M #1–5; New Thunderbolts #11; Fantastic Four: House of M #1–3; Black Panther (2005) #7; Uncanny X-Men #462–465	344	9 Dec 2009	Joe Quesada cover: 978-0785138815
House Of M: Wolverine, Iron Man & Hulk	2005	Wolverine (2003) #33–35; Iron Man: House of M #1–3; Incredible Hulk (2000) #83–87; Captain America (2005) #10; The Pulse #10; Cable & Deadpool #17; material from Hulk: Broken Worlds #1	352	27 Jan 2010	978-0785138822
House Of M: No More Mutants	2005	Mutopia X #1–5; New X-Men (2004) #16–19; Exiles #69–71; House of M: The Day After #1; material from Giant-Size Ms. Marvel #1	352	28 Apr 2010	Olivier Coipel cover: 978-0785138839

=== Inferno (1988) ===
Title	Years covered	Material collected	Pages	Released	ISBN
X-Men: Inferno Prologue	1988	Uncanny X-Men #228–238, Annual #12; X-Factor #27–32, Annual #3; New Mutants #62–70, Annual #4; material from Marvel Age Annual #4, Marvel Fanfare #40	824	3 Dec 2014	Marc Silvestri cover: 978-0785192732
X-Men: Inferno	1988-1989	Uncanny X-Men #239–243; New Mutants #71–73; X-Factor #33–40; X-Terminators #1–4; X-Factor Annual #4	592	3 Jun 2009	Marc Silvestri cover: 978-0785137771
X-Men: Inferno Crossovers	1988-1989	Power Pack #40, 42–44; Avengers #298–300, Fantastic Four #322–324, Amazing Spider-Man #311–313, Spectacular Spider-Man #146–148, Web Of Spider-Man #47–48, Daredevil #262–263, Excalibur #6–7, Cloak & Dagger #4	608	25 Aug 2010	Todd McFarlane cover: 978-0785146711

=== Infinity (2013) ===
Title	Years covered	Material collected	Pages	Released	ISBN
Infinity	2013	Infinity (2013) #1–6; New Avengers #7–12; Avengers (vol. 5) (2012) #12–23; Infinity Infinite Comic #1–2	632	5 Feb 2014	Adam Kubert cover: 978-0785184225
Infinity Companion	2013	Infinity: The Hunt #1–4; Infinity: Heist #1–4, and more: Avengers Assemble #18–20; Captain Marvel (2012) #15–16; Fearless Defenders #10; Guardians Of The Galaxy #8–9; Mighty Avengers (2013) #1–3; Nova (2013) #8–9; Secret Avengers (2013) #10–11; Superior Spider-Man Team-Up #3–4; Thunderbolts (2013) #14–18; Wolverine & the X-Men Annual (2011)	688	9 Apr 2014	Marko Djurdjevic cover: 978-0785188865

=== Infinity Wars ===
Title	Years covered	Material collected	Pages	Released	ISBN
Infinity Wars by Gerry Duggan: The Complete Collection	2018	Infinity Wars #1–6; Infinity Countdown #1–5, and more: Infinity Countdown Prime; Infinity Countdown: Adam Warlock; FCBD 2018: Amazing Spider-Man/Guardians of the Galaxy; Infinity Wars Prime; Infinity Wars: Fallen Guardian; Infinity Wars: Infinity; Thanos Legacy	592	18 Sep 2019	Mike Deodato cover: 978-1302914967

=== Inhumanity ===
Title	Years covered	Material collected	Pages	Released	ISBN
Inhumanity	2014	Inhumanity #1–2; Avengers Assemble #21–23; Uncanny X-Men #15; Indestructible Hulk #17–19; New Avengers #13; Iron Man #20; Inhumanity: The Awakening #1–#2, Avengers A.I. #7, Mighty Avengers #4–5, Inhumanity: Superior Spider-Man #1	448	4 Jun 2014	Olivier Coipel cover: 978-0785190332

=== Onslaught ===
Title	Years covered	Material collected	Pages	Released	ISBN
Onslaught Reborn	2007	Onslaught Reborn #1–5	136	27 Feb 2008	Rob Liefeld cover: 978-0785136545
Onslaught Unleashed	2011	Onslaught Unleashed #1–4	112	20 Jul 2011	Humberto Ramos cover: 978-0785157762

=== Original Sin ===
Title	Years covered	Material collected	Pages	Released	ISBN
Original Sin	2014	Original Sin #0–8; Original Sins #1–5; material from Point One #1	392	29 Oct 2014	Julian Totino Tedesco cover: 978-0785190691
Original Sin Companion	2014	Original Sin #3.1–3.4; Original Sin #5.1–5.5, and more: Avengers (vol. 5) #29–34; Deadpool #29–34; Mighty Avengers (vol. 2) #10–12; All-New Invaders #6–7; Nova #18–20; Fantastic Four #6–8; Daredevil #6–7; Amazing Spider-Man #4–5; Uncanny X-Men (vol. 3) #23–25; Guardians of the Galaxy Annual #1; Original Sin: Secret Avengers Infinite Comic #1–2	968	21 Jan 2015	Arthur Adams cover: 978-0785192121

=== Secret Empire ===
Title	Years covered	Material collected	Pages	Released	ISBN
Secret Empire	2016	Secret Empire #0–10; Secret Empire Omega; FCBD (Secret Empire)	432	25 Oct 2017	Mark Brooks cover: 978-0785194521

=== Secret Invasion ===
Title	Years covered	Material collected	Pages	Released	ISBN
Secret Invasion	2008	Secret Invasion #1–8	288	25 Aug 2010	Leinil Yu cover: 978-0785149170

=== Secret War ===
The Secret War hardcover was reprinted in 2025. It contains four extra issues from The Pulse and has the Marvel Omnibus branding.

Title	Years covered	Material collected	Pages	Released	ISBN
Secret War	2004-2005	Secret War #1–5; From The Files Of Nick Fury	256	1 Mar 2006	Leinil Yu cover: 978-0785118374

=== Secret Wars (2015) ===
Title	Years covered	Material collected	Pages	Released	ISBN
Secret Wars	2015	Secret Wars (2015) #0–8	312	16 Mar 2016	Alex Ross cover: 978-0785198840
Secret Wars: Last Days Of The Marvel Universe	2015	Captain America and the Mighty Avengers #8–9; Loki: Agent of Asgard #14–17; Magneto (2014) #18–21; Black Widow (2014) #19–20; Ms. Marvel (2014) #16–19; Punisher (2014) #19–20; Silver Surfer (2014) #13–15; Ant-Man: Last Days; All-New Silk (vol. 1) #7; Spider-Woman (2014) #10	528	1 Jun 2016	Esad Ribic cover: 978-1302901240

=== Siege ===
Title	Years covered	Material collected	Pages	Released	ISBN
Siege	2010	Siege #1–4; New Avengers #61–64; Dark Avengers #13–16; Siege: The Cabal; Siege Prologue; material from Siege: Director's Cut #1	440	21 Dec 2011	Olivier Coipel cover: 978-0785163169

=== War Of Kings ===
#	Title	Years covered	Material collected	Pages	Released	ISBN
1	War Of Kings	2009	War Of Kings #1–6; War Of Kings: Ascension #1–4; War Of Kings: Darkhawk #1–2; War Of Kings: Warriors; War Of Kings: Who Will Rule; War Of Kings: Savage World Of Sakaar; Marvel Spotlight: War Of Kings	432	18 Nov 2009	Brandon Peterson cover: 978-0785142935
2	Realm Of Kings	2009-2010	Realm Of Kings: Inhumans #1–5; Realm Of Kings: Son Of Hulk #1–4, Realm Of Kings: Imperial Guard #1–5	368	21 Jul 2010	Clint Langley cover: 978-0785148098

== Alternate universe OHCs ==
As part of the Marvel multiverse, other fictional continuities exist. Books in this section still contain Marvel characters; however, they are alternate versions who don't, or rarely, interact with characters from the mainstream Earth-616 section.

=== 1602 Universe (Earth-311) ===
Written by Neil Gaiman, with art from Andy Kubert, Marvel's 1602 universe reimagines the superheroes as if they existed in the Elizabethan era.

Title	Years collected	Material collected	Pages	Released	ISBN
Marvel 1602	2003	Marvel 1602 #1–8	248	6 Oct 2004	978-0785110705
Marvel 1602 10th Anniversary	2003	Marvel 1602 #1–8	264	27 Aug 2013	978-0785153689

=== Earth X (Earth-9997) ===
The Earth X universe was created by Dave Kreuger and Alex Ross, and "showed a possible near future for the Marvel Universe". The project came from "an article for Wizard Magazine and their reaction to the amazing work Alex had done in reimagining and designing the DCU for Kingdom Come." The Earth X universe is designated as Earth-9997.

A year before Marvel officially launched the oversized hardcover format, June 2001 saw Earth X released as a limited 'clamshell' edition. This featured the "hardcover book, sculpted translucent, outer-skin box, 36" x 24" poster and two compact disc containing a wealth of digital audio/visual material". It was limited to 6,000 copies and slightly wider than what became 'oversized'.

Title	Years collected	Material collected	Pages	Released	ISBN
Earth X	1999	Earth X #0–12, ½	592	31 Aug 2005	Alex Ross cover: 978-0785118756

=== Marvel Zombies (Earth-2149) ===
The first appearance of Marvel Zombies was in Ultimate Fantastic Four #21, written by Mark Millar. He said: "I had this idea on the plane from Scotland about a superhero arriving from another dimension with a zombie plague and biting the Avengers when they showed up to contain the problem. Everyone hated it. It was so universally loathed and everyone thought I was kidding when I suggested it."

Despite that, after the first appearance, the concept grew to launch its own series, with Marvel Zombies and Marvel Zombies 2 written by The Walking Dead creator, Robert Kirkman. The initial Zombies universe is designated Earth-2149.

#	Title	Years covered	Material collected	Pages	Released	ISBN
1	Marvel Zombies	2006	Marvel Zombies #1–5	136	19 Dec 2007	Arthur Suydam Secret Wars #1 cover: 978-0785122777
1	Marvel Zombies	2006	Marvel Zombies #1–5	136	8 Nov 2006	Arthur Suydam Amazing Spider-Man #316 cover: 978-0785126089
1	Marvel Zombies	2006	Marvel Zombies #1–5	136	24 Jan 2007	Arthur Suydam Fantastic Four #49 cover: 978-0785127734
1	Marvel Zombies	2006	Marvel Zombies #1–5	136	9 May 2007	Arthur Suydam Avengers #1 cover: 978-0785128229
1	Marvel Zombies	2006	Marvel Zombies #1–5	136	18 Jul 2007	Arthur Suydam Mary Jane #2 cover: 978-0785128946
1	Marvel Zombies	2006	Marvel Zombies #1–5	136	19 Dec 2007	Arthur Suydam Iron Man #128 cover: 978-0785131922
2	Marvel Zombies 2	2007	Marvel Zombies 2 #1–5	120	11 Jun 2008	Arthur Suydam Civil War #1 cover: 978-0785125457
	Marvel Zombies/Army Of Darkness	2007	Marvel Zombies/Army Of Darkness #1–5	128	21 Sep 2007	Arthur Suydam Uncanny X-Men 268 cover: 978-0785127437
	Marvel Zombies/Army Of Darkness	2007	Marvel Zombies/Army Of Darkness #1–5	128	30 Jan 2008	Arthur Suydam Captain America DM cover: 978-0785132233
3	Marvel Zombies 3	2008	Marvel Zombies 3 #1–4	112	8 Apr 2008	Arthur Suydam Machine Man #1 cover: 978-0785136354
	Marvel Zombies: Dead Days	2008	Marvel Zombies: Dead Days #1; Ultimate Fantastic Four #21–23, 30–32; Black Panther #28–30	272	9 Apr 2008	Arthur Suydam X-Men #1 cover: 978-0785132325
4	Marvel Zombies 4	2009	Marvel Zombies 4 #1–4	112	14 Oct 2009	Arthur Suydam Marvel Premiere #28 cover: 978-0785139171
	Marvel Zombies Return	2009	Marvel Zombies Return #1–5	160	23 Dec 2009	Arthur Suydam Hulk cover: 978-0785142775
5	Marvel Zombies 5	2010	Marvel Zombies 5 #1–5	120	20 Oct 2010	Arthur Suydam Howard The Duck cover: 978-0785147435
	Marvel Zombies Supreme	2011	Marvel Zombies Supreme #1–5	120	14 Sep 2011	Michael Komarck cover: 978-0785151678
	Marvel Zombies Christmas Carol	2011	Marvel Zombies Christmas Carol #1–5	136	14 Sep 2011	William Kaluta cover: 978-0785157724
	Marvel Zombies Christmas Carol	2011	Marvel Zombies Christmas Carol #1–5	136	14 Sep 2011	Janet Lee DM cover: 978-0785162254
	Marvel Zombies Destroy	2012	Marvel Zombies Destroy #1–5	112	26 Sep 2012	Michael Del Mundo cover: 978-0785163848
	Marvel Zombies: The Covers	2006-2007	Covers from the Marvel Zombies books	104	24 Oct 2007	Arthur Suydam cover: 978-0785129080

=== Marvel Apes (Earth-8101) ===
The idea for Marvel Apes originated at the 2007 New York Comic Convention. Series artist Ramon Bachs said: "...it all came from a joke at a convention between (Marvel Editor-in-chief) Joe Quesada and a fan, talking about Marvel Zombies. Something like, "What's next? Marvel Apes!".

The series was green-lit and launched in 2008, with Karl Kesel writing, and Bachs on pencils. Kesel said the series involved "...a monkeyverse where everyone's some sort of ape or monkey. Most of the major Marvel characters have counterparts."

Title	Years collected	Material collected	Pages	Released	ISBN
Marvel Apes	2008	Marvel Apes #0–4; Amazing Spider-Man #110–111	176	15 Apr 2009	John Watson Wolverine cover: 978-0785139140

=== Ronin Universe (Earth-11542) ===
Writer Peter Milligan used the 5 Ronin series to re-imagine Marvel heroes as samurais in ancient Japan. The hardcover includes all five issues, featuring Hulk, Wolverine, Psyclocke, Punisher, and Deadpool.

Title	Years collected	Material collected	Pages	Released	ISBN
5 Ronin	2011	5 Ronin (2011) #1–5	120	25 May 2011	John Cassady Wolverine cover: 978-0785156321
5 Ronin	2011	5 Ronin (2011) #1–5	120	25 May 2011	David Aja Ronin cover: 978-0785157717

=== Spider-Man Loves Mary-Jane (Earth-602636) ===
Sean McKeever's "shojo romance manga" interpretation launched in 2004, with the Mary Jane series. The all-ages title focused more on the relationship between a teenage Peter Parker and Mary Jane Watson than Spider-Man's superhero antics. It was first collected in a series of digests, before being reprinted as a pair of oversized hardcovers.

- See more: Spider-Man Loves Mary Jane collected editions

#	Title	Years covered	Material collected	Pages	Released	ISBN
1	Spider-Man Loves Mary Jane Vol. 1	2004-2006	Mary Jane #1–4, Mary Jane: Homecoming #1–4, Spider-Man Loves Mary Jane (2005) #1–5	320	11 Apr 2007	Takeshi Miyazawa cover: 978-0785126102
2	Spider-Man Loves Mary Jane Vol. 2	2006-2007	Spider-Man Loves Mary Jane (2005) #6–20	368	3 Sep 2008	Takeshi Miyazawa cover: 978-0785130833

=== Squadron Supreme (Earth-31916) ===
Marvel's Squadron Supreme was created by Roy Thomas in 1971 as the company's version of DC's Justice League. The series was reinvented by J. Michael Straczynski as Supreme Power in 2003, part of the company's MAX imprint.

The adult-orientated comics allowed for a much darker interpretation of the characters where: "All the heroes' actions bring to mind the question of how far superheroes should go. The result was a book that took a somewhat overlooked classic and kicked its themes into overdrive."

#	Title	Years covered	Material collected	Pages	Released	ISBN
1	Supreme Power Vol. 1	2003-2004	Supreme Power #1–12; Avengers (vol. 1) #85–86	352	13 Apr 2005	Gary Frank cover: 978-0785113690
2	Supreme Power Vol. 2	2004-2006	Supreme Power #13–18; Supreme Power: Hyperion #1–6	264	13 Dec 2006	Gary Frank cover: 978-0785121336

=== Ultimate Universe (Earth-1610) ===
Ultimate Marvel launched in 2000 as a response to "so much backstory that the stories (in the main books) were almost incomprehensible."

Bill Jemas, President of Marvel Enterprises from 2000 to 2004, wrote: "Joe Quesada and I started the Ultimate books because we wanted Marvel to get back in touch with kids. We wanted Marvel's great teen heroes - Spidey and the X-Men - to star in comics for 2001 kids." The first Ultimate universe is designated as Earth-1610.

Title	Years collected	Material collected	Pages	Released	ISBN
Ultimate Galactus Trilogy	2004-2006	Ultimate Nightmare #1–5; Ultimate Secret #1–4; Ultimate Extinction #1–5	344	30 May 2007	Brandon Peterson cover: 978-0785121398
Ultimate Power	2006-2007	Ultimate Power #1–9	232	5 Mar 2008	Greg Land cover: 978-0785123668
Ultimatum Companion	2008	Ultimate Fantastic Four #58–60; Ultimate Spider-Man #129–133; Ultimate X-Men #98–100, and more: Ultimatum Fantastic Four: Requiem; Ultimatum Spider-Man: Requiem #1–2; Ultimatum X-Men: Requiem; March on Ultimatum Saga; Marvel Spotlight: Ultimatum	488	15 Jun 2011	David Finch cover: 978-0785155072
Ultimate Comics Doomsday	2010-2011	Ultimate Comics Enemy #1–4; Ultimate Comics Mystery #1–4; Ultimate Comics Doom #1–4	288	18 May 2011	Ed McGuinness cover: 978-0785147763
Ultimate Comics Divided We Fall, United We Stand	2011-2012	Ultimate Comics X-Men #13–18; Ultimate Comics Ultimates #13–18; Ultimate Comics Spider-Man (vol. 2) #13–18	376	30 Jan 2013	Michael Komarck cover: 978-0785167815
Cataclysm: The Ultimates' Last Stand	2013	Cataclysm: The Ultimates' Last Stand #1–5, and more: Hunger #1–4; Cataclysm #0.1; Cataclysm: Ultimate Spider-Man #1–3; Cataclysm: Ultimate X-Men #1–3; Cataclysm: Ultimates #1–3, Ultimate Prologue	440	28 May 2014	Mark Bagley cover: 978-0785189190

==== The Ultimates ====
#	Title	Years collected	Material collected	Pages	Released	ISBN
1	The Ultimates Vol. 1	2002-2004	The Ultimates (vol. 1) #1-13	376	27 Oct 2004	Bryan Hitch cover: 978-0785110828
2	The Ultimates Vol. 2	2005-2007	The Ultimates (vol. 2) #1-13, Ultimates Annual	464	26 Dec 2007	Bryan Hitch cover: 978-0785121381
	Ultimatum	2008	The Ultimates (vol. 3) #1-5, Ultimatum #1-5	272	10 Nov 2010	Joe Madureira cover: 978-0785134343
	Ultimatum	2008	The Ultimates (vol. 3) #1-5, Ultimatum #1-5	272	10 Nov 2010	Michael Turner DM cover: 978-0785149873

==== Ultimate Fantastic Four ====
#	Title	Years collected	Material collected	Pages	Released	ISBN
1	Ultimate Fantastic Four Vol. 1	2004	Ultimate Fantastic Four #1–12	320	8 Jun 2005	978-0785114581
2	Ultimate Fantastic Four Vol. 2	2005	Ultimate Fantastic Four #13–20, Ultimate Fantastic Four Annual #1	240	19 Jul 2006	978-0785120582
3	Ultimate Fantastic Four Vol. 3	2005-2006	Ultimate Fantastic Four #21–32	296	20 Jun 2007	978-0785126034
4	Ultimate Fantastic Four Vol. 4	2006-2007	Ultimate Fantastic Four #33–41,Ultimate Fantastic Four Annual #2, Ultimate X-Men/Ultimate Fantastic Four, Ultimate Fantastic Four/Ultimate X-Men	320	14 Nov 2007	978-0785128724
5	Ultimate Fantastic Four Vol. 5	2007-2008	Ultimate Fantastic Four #42–53	288	3 Sep 2008	978-0785130826
6	Ultimate Fantastic Four Vol. 6	2008	Ultimate Fantastic Four #54–57, Official Handbook of the Ultimate Marvel Universe #1–2, Ultimate Secrets	256	12 Aug 2009	978-0785137818

==== Ultimate Marvel Team-Up ====
Title	Years collected	Material collected	Pages	Released	ISBN
Ultimate Marvel Team-Up	2001-2002	Ultimate Marvel Team-Up #1-16, Ultimate Spider-Man Special	432	21 Aug 2002	978-0785108702

==== Ultimate Spider-Man (2000) ====
#	Title	Years collected	Material collected	Pages	Released	ISBN
1	Ultimate Spider-Man Vol. 1	2000-2001	Ultimate Spider-Man #1–13	354	20 Mar 2002	978-0785108986
2	Ultimate Spider-Man Vol. 2	2001-2002	Ultimate Spider-Man #14–27	336	10 Mar 2003	978-0785110613
3	Ultimate Spider-Man Vol. 3	2002-2003	Ultimate Spider-Man #28–39, ½	304	29 Sep 2003	978-0785111566
4	Ultimate Spider-Man Vol. 4	2003-2004	Ultimate Spider-Man #40–45, 47–53	336	1 Jul 2004	978-0785112495
5	Ultimate Spider-Man Vol. 5	2003-2004	Ultimate Spider-Man #46, 54–59; Ultimate Six #1–7	352	24 Nov 2004	978-0785114017
6	Ultimate Spider-Man Vol. 6	2004-2005	Ultimate Spider-Man #60–71	296	5 Oct 2005	978-0785118411
7	Ultimate Spider-Man Vol. 7	2005-2006	Ultimate Spider-Man #72–85	344	18 Oct 2006	978-0785121480
8	Ultimate Spider-Man Vol. 8	2006	Ultimate Spider-Man #86–96, Annual #1–2	344	11 Apr 2007	978-0785126041
9	Ultimate Spider-Man Vol. 9	2006-2007	Ultimate Spider-Man #97–111	400	27 Feb 2008	978-0785130819
10	Ultimate Spider-Man Vol. 10	2007-2008	Ultimate Spider-Man #112–122	272	4 Mar 2009	978-0785137764
11	Ultimate Spider-Man Vol. 11	2008-2009	Ultimate Spider-Man #123–133, Annual #3; Ultimatum: Spider-Man – Requiem #1–2	384	22 Jun 2010	978-0785146421
12	Ultimate Spider-Man Vol. 12	2009-2010	Ultimate Spider-Man (vol. 2) #1–14	352	16 May 2012	978-0785164623

==== Ultimate X-Men ====
#	Title	Years collected	Material collected	Pages	Released	ISBN
1	Ultimate X-Men Vol. 1	2001-2002	Ultimate X-Men #1–12, Giant-Size X-Men #1	352	7 Aug 2002	978-0785110088
2	Ultimate X-Men Vol. 2	2002-2003	Ultimate X-Men #13–25	336	24 Mar 2003	978-0785111306
3	Ultimate X-Men Vol. 3	2003	Ultimate X-Men #26–33; Ultimate War #1–4	312	10 Dec 2003	978-0785111313
4	Ultimate X-Men Vol. 4	2003-2004	Ultimate X-Men #34–45	304	23 Feb 2005	978-0785112518
5	Ultimate X-Men Vol. 5	2004-2005	Ultimate X-Men #46–57	296	4 Jan 2006	978-0785121039
6	Ultimate X-Men Vol. 6	2005-2006	Ultimate X-Men #58–65, ½; Ultimate X-Men Annual #1	256	30 Aug 2006	978-0785121046
7	Ultimate X-Men Vol. 7	2006	Ultimate X-Men #66–74; Ultimate X-Men Annual #2	256	8 Aug 2007	978-0785126058
8	Ultimate X-Men Vol. 8	2006-2008	Ultimate X-Men #75–88	352	25 Jun 2008	978-0785130802
9	Ultimate X-Men Vol. 9	2008	Ultimate X-Men #89–97	232	26 Aug 2009	978-0785137795

== Licensed OHCs ==
As well as publishing omnibuses featuring the company's own characters, Marvel also releases books from other franchises. Some of these – like Star Wars – are owned by Marvel's parent company, Disney; others are licensed for certain periods of time, which includes creator-owned content.

=== Anita Blake (Laurell K. Hamilton) ===
Title	Material collected	Pages	Released	ISBN
Anita Blake, Vampire Hunter: Guilty Pleasures	Anita Blake, Vampire Hunter: Guilty Pleasures #1–12	320	14 Oct 2009	Brett Booth cover: 978-0785140214

=== Conan ===
Title	Material collected	Pages	Released	ISBN
Conan The Barbarian by Aaron & Asrar	Conan The Barbarian (2019) #1–12	296	3 Feb 2021	Esad Ribic cover: 978-1302926526

=== Criminal, Incognito (Ed Brubaker) ===
After Ed Brubaker launched Sleeper for DC comics alongside Sean Phillips in 2003, the duo moved to Marvel. Criminal #1 debuted in 2006, as part of the company's Icon imprint. Between that and Incognito, the pair released more than three-dozen creator-owned comics, reprinted in a trio of deluxe oversized hardcovers. They switched to Image Comics in 2014.

#	Title	Material collected	Pages	Released	ISBN
1	Criminal: The Deluxe Edition Vol. 1	Criminal (2006) #1–10; Criminal (2008) #1–3	432	4 Nov 2009	Sean Phillips cover: 978-0785142294
2	Criminal: The Deluxe Edition Vol. 2	Criminal (2008) #4-7; Criminal: The Sinners #1-5; Criminal: The Last Of The Innocent #1-4	432	3 Oct 2012	Sean Phillips cover: 978-0785165842
	Incognito: The Classified Edition	Incognito #1-6; Incognito: Bad Influences #1-5	368	5 Sep 2012	Sean Phillips cover: 978-0785165743

=== Disney ===
#	Title	Material collected	Pages	Released	ISBN
	Big Thunder Mountain Railroad	Big Thunder Mountain Railroad #1–5	128	14 Oct 2015	Pasqual Ferry cover: 978-0785197010
	Disney Kingdoms: Seekers Of The Weird	Disney Kingdoms: Seekers Of The Weird #1–5	136	23 Jul 2014	Michael Del Mundo cover: 978-0785154525
	Enchanted Tiki Room	Enchanted Tiki Room #1–5	128	12 Apr 2017	Brian Kesinger cover: 978-1302902797
1	Figment	Figment #1–5	136	6 May 2015	John Tyler Christopher cover: 978-0785190998
2	Figment 2: Legacy Of Imagination	Figment 2 #1–5	136	30 Mar 2016	John Tyler Christopher cover: 978-0785198475
	The Haunted Mansion	The Haunted Mansion #1–5	128	21 Sep 2016	E.M. Gist cover: 978-1302900762

=== Empire Of The Dead (George Romero) ===
Title	Material collected	Pages	Released	ISBN
George Romero's Empire Of The Dead	George Romero's Empire Of The Dead Act One #1–5; Act Two #1–5; Act Three #1–5	336	28 Sep 2016	Alexander Lozano cover: 978-0785185185

=== Kabuki (David Mack) ===
Title	Material collected	Pages	Released	ISBN
Kabuki	Kabuki: Circle Of Blood #1-6	272	3 Nov 2010	David Mack cover: 978-0785150022
Kabuki	Kabuki: Circle Of Blood #1-6	272	3 Nov 2010	David Mack DM cover: 978-0785150039
Kabuki: Reflections	Kabuki: Reflections #1-6	320	28 Apr 2010	David Mack cover: 978-0785143284
Kabuki: The Alchemy	Kabuki (2004) #1–9	320	4 Mar 2009	David Mack cover: 978-0785133117

=== Kick Ass (Mark Millar) ===
Title	Material collected	Pages	Released	ISBN
Kick Ass	Kick-Ass #1–8	216	1 May 2013	John Romita Jr. cover: 978-0785184010

=== Max Ride (James Patterson) ===
#	Title	Material collected	Pages	Released	ISBN
1	Max Ride: First Flight	Max Ride: First Flight #1–5	144	7 Oct 2015	Stephanie Hans cover: 978-0785197423
2	Max Ride: Ultimate Flight	Max Ride: Ultimate Flight #1–5	136	7 Jun 2016	Yasmine Putri cover: 978-0785195856
3	Max Ride: Final Flight	Max Ride: Final Flight #1–5	136	8 Mar 2017	David Nakayama cover: 978-0785195856

=== Oz ===
#	Title	Material collected	Pages	Released	ISBN
1	The Wonderful Wizard Of Oz	The Wonderful Wizard Of Oz #1–8	192	2 Sep 2009	Skottie Young cover: 978-0785129219
1	The Wonderful Wizard Of Oz	incl Wonderful Wizard Of Oz Sketchbook	224	2 Apr 2014	Skottie Young cover: 978-0785154471
2	The Marvelous Land Of Oz	The Marvelous Land Of Oz #1–8	192	15 Sep 2010	Skottie Young cover: 978-0785140283
3	Ozma Of Oz	Ozma Of Oz #1–8	192	7 Sep 2011	Skottie Young cover: 978-0785142478
4	Dorothy & The Wizard In Oz	Dorothy & The Wizard In Oz #1–8	186	12 Sep 2012	Skottie Young cover: 978-0785155546
5	Road To Oz	Road To Oz #1–6	136	10 Apr 2013	Skottie Young cover: 978-0785164043
6	The Emerald City Of Oz	The Emerald City Of Oz #1–5	136	5 Mar 2014	Skottie Young cover: 978-0785183884

=== Powers (Brian Michael Bendis) ===
The Powers series was published by Image Comics between 2000 and 2004, before moving to Marvel's Icon label in 2004.

Seven 'definitive' oversized hardcovers were published between then and 2017, before writer Brian Michael Bendis signed a deal to republish the books with Dark Horse Comics in 2021.

#	Title	Material collected	Pages	Released	ISBN
1	Powers: The Definitive Hardcover Collection Vol. 1	Powers (2000) #1–11	464	25 Jan 2006	Michael Avon Oeming cover: 978-0785118053
2	Powers: The Definitive Hardcover Collection Vol. 2	Powers (2000) #12–24; Powers Annual #1	480	21 Jan 2009	Michael Avon Oeming cover: 978-0785124405
3	Powers: The Definitive Hardcover Collection Vol. 3	Powers (2000) #25-37	496	25 Nov 2009	Michael Avon Oeming cover: 978-0785133094
4	Powers: The Definitive Hardcover Collection Vol. 4	Powers (2004) #1-18	600	15 Dec 2010	Michael Avon Oeming cover: 978-0785153160
5	Powers: The Definitive Hardcover Collection Vol. 5	Powers (2004) #19-30, Powers Annual 2008	464	12 Sep 2012	Michael Avon Oeming cover: 978-0785166122
6	Powers: The Definitive Hardcover Collection Vol. 6	Powers (2009) #1-11	424	2 Jul 2014	Michael Avon Oeming cover: 978-0785191490
7	Powers: The Definitive Hardcover Collection Vol. 7	Powers: The Bureau #1–12	368	21 Jun 2017	Michael Avon Oeming cover: 978-1302907402

=== Star Wars ===
Following the October 2012 acquisition of Lucasfilm by Disney, it was announced that the Star Wars comics license would return to Marvel Comics in 2015.

The company used the oversized hardcover format to re-release remastered comic book versions of the original Star Wars trilogy. It also launched a new canon continuity, with Star Wars (2015) #1. This issue "exceeded one million copies sold on the direct market ... the top-selling single issue of the past 20 years." The first 12 issues of the book was collected in an oversized hardcover a little over a year after launch.

#	Title	Years covered	Material collected	Pages	Released	ISBN
Movie adaptations
IV	Star Wars Episode IV: A New Hope	1977	Star Wars (1977) #1–6	128	6 May 2015	Adi Granov cover: 978-0785193487
IV	Star Wars Special Edition: A New Hope	1977	Star Wars: A New Hope Special Edition #1–4	112	5 Apr 2017	Dave Dorman cover: 978-1302903763
V	Star Wars Episode V: The Empire Strikes Back	1980	Star Wars (1977) #39–44	144	12 Aug 2015	Adi Granov cover: 978-0785193678
VI	Star Wars Episode VI: Return Of The Jedi	1983	Star Wars: Return Of The Jedi #1–4	112	11 Nov 2015	Adi Granov cover: 978-0785193692
I	Star Wars: Episode I - The Phantom Menace	1999	Star Wars: The Phantom Menace #1–4	120	25 May 2016	Mike Mayhew cover: 978-1302900748
II	Star Wars: Episode II - Attack Of The Clones	2002	Star Wars: Attack Of The Clones #1–4	152	7 Sep 2016	Mike Mayhew cover: 978-1302900755
III	Star Wars: Episode III - Revenge Of The Sith	2005	Star Wars: Revenge Of The Sith #1–4	112	30 Nov 2016	Mike Mayhew cover: 978-1302901066
VII	Star Wars: The Force Awakens Adaptation	2015	Star Wars: The Force Awakens Adaptation #1–6	144	7 Dec 2016	Phil Noto cover: 978-1302901783
	Star Wars: Rogue One Adaptation	2016-2017	Star Wars: Rogue One Adaptation #1–6; Star Wars: Rogue One - Cassian & K-2SO Special	176	11 Jul 2018	Phil Noto cover: 978-0785194569
Ongoing continuity
1	Star Wars Vol. 1	2015-2016	Star Wars (2015) #1–12	296	7 Sep 2016	John Cassaday cover: 978-1302900984
1	Star Wars Vol. 1	2015-2016	Star Wars (2015) #1–12	296	7 Sep 2016	Stuart Immonen DM cover: 978-1302901981
2	Star Wars Vol. 2	2016-2017	Star Wars (2015) #15–25, Annual #1	288	7 Jun 2017	David Aja cover: 978-1302903749
2	Star Wars Vol. 2	2016-2017	Star Wars (2015) #15–25, Annual #1	288	7 Jun 2017	Terry Dodson DM cover: 978-1302907211
3	Star Wars Vol. 3	2017-2018	Star Wars (2015) #26–30, 33–37; Annual #2–3	256	4 Jul 2018	Mike Mayhew cover: 978-1302909031
	Journey To Star Wars: The Force Awakens - Shattered Empire	2015	Journey to Star Wars: The Force Awakens - Shattered Empire #1–4; Princess Leia #1; Star Wars (1977) #1	144	31 Aug 2016	Marco Checchetto cover: 978-1302902100
	Star Wars: Heroes For A New Hope	2015-2016	Princess Leia #1–5; Lando #1–5; Chewbacca #1–5	344	2 Nov 2016	978-1302902230
1	Star Wars: Darth Vader Vol. 1	2015-2016	Darth Vader (2015) #1–12	296	6 Jul 2016	Adi Granov cover: 978-1302901950
1	Star Wars: Darth Vader Vol. 1	2015-2016	Darth Vader (2015) #1–12	296	6 Jul 2016	Alex Ross DM cover: 978-1302902094
2	Star Wars: Darth Vader Vol. 2	2016-2017	Darth Vader (2015) #13–25; Annual #1; Star Wars (2015) #13–14; Star Wars: Vader Down	440	8 Feb 2017	Kaare Andrews cover: 978-1302902209
1	Star Wars: Darth Vader – Dark Lord Of The Sith Vol. 1	2017-2018	Darth Vader (2017) #1–12	280	24 Oct 2018	Jim Cheung cover: 978-1302913601
2	Star Wars: Darth Vader – Dark Lord Of The Sith Vol. 2	2018-2019	Darth Vader (2017) #13–25; Annual #2	336	12 Aug 2020	Mike Deodato cover: 978-1302925451
	Star Wars: Han Solo	2016	Han Solo #1–5; Star Wars (2015) #8–12	232	2 May 2018	Stephanie Hans cover: 978-1302912109
	Journey To Star Wars: The Last Jedi – Captain Phasma	2017	Journey To Star Wars: The Last Jedi - Captain Phasma #1–4	112	18 Jul 2018	Paul Renaud cover: 978-0785194552
	Star Wars: Doctor Aphra	2016-2017	Doctor Aphra #1–8; Star Wars: The Screaming Citadel; Star Wars (2015) #31–32	272	19 Sep 2018	Kamome Shirahama cover: 978-1302913212
1	Star Wars: Age Of Republic	2019	Star Wars: Age Of Republic - Anakin Skywalker; Count Dooku; Darth Maul; General Grievous; Jango Fett; Obi-Wan Kenobi; Padme Amidala; Qui-Gon Jinn; Star Wars: Age Of Republic Special	224	5 Feb 2020	Leinil Francis Yu cover: 978-1302917098
2	Star Wars: Age Of Rebellion	2019	Star Wars: Age Of Rebellion - Boba Fett; Darth Vader; Han Solo; Jabba The Hutt; Lando Calrissian; Luke Skywalker; Princess Leia; Grand Moff Tarkin; Star Wars: Age Of Rebellion Special	240	17 Jun 2020	Gerald Parel cover: 978-1302917074
3	Star Wars: Age Of Resistance	2019	Star Wars: Age Of Resistance - Captain Phasma; Finn; General Hux; Kylo Ren; Poe Dameron; Rey; Rose Tico; Supreme Leader Snoke; Star Wars: Age Of Resistance Special	232	9 Sep 2020	Patrick Zircher cover: 978-1302917111
Covers collections
	Star Wars: The Marvel Covers		Classic and new Star Wars Marvel covers	224	7 Oct 2015	Alex Ross cover: 978-0785198383
	Star Wars: The Marvel Covers		Classic and new Star Wars Marvel covers	224	7 Oct 2015	Joe Quesada DM cover: 978-0785198970
	Star Wars: A New Hope 40th Anniversary	1977	Marvel's 40th anniversary cover art, retelling the story of A New Hope	152	4 Apr 2018	Greg Land cover: 978-1302911287

== Miscellaneous OHCs ==
#	Title	Material collected	Pages	Released	ISBN
	Jack Kirby's Galactic Bounty Hunters Vol. 1	Jack Kirby's Galactic Bounty Hunters #1–6	256	12 Dec 2007	978-0785126287
1	Marvel Hip-Hop Covers Vol. 1	70 comic-book covers inspired by some of the most iconic albums in music history	152	21 Sep 2016	978-1302902339
2	Marvel Hip-Hop Covers Vol. 2	More comic-book covers inspired by iconic album art	168	6 Sep 2017	978-1302908430
	The Marvel Legacy Of Jack Kirby	Essays, commentary and reviews, focusing on the times of Kirby, with a special focus on November 1961	240	7 Oct 2015	978-0785197935
	Marvel Westerns	Marvel Westerns: The Two-Gun Kid; Marvel Westerns: Western Legends, and more: Marvel Westerns: Kid Colt and the Arizona Girl; Marvel Westerns: Strange Westerns Starring the Black Rider; Marvel Westerns: Outlaw Files; Rawhide Kid (1955) #17	248	15 Nov 2006	Eric Powell & Marshall Rogers cover: 978-0785122807
	Timely 70th Anniversary Collection	All Select Comics 70th Anniversary Special; All Winners Comics 70th Anniversary Special, and more: USA Comics 70th Anniversary Special; Marvel Mystery Comics 70th Anniversary Special; Captain America Comics 70th Anniversary Special; Mystic Comics 70th Anniversary Special; Young Allies Comics 70th Anniversary Special; Miss America Comics 70th Anniversary Special; Sub-Mariner Comics 70th Anniversary Special; Human Torch Comics 70th Anniversary Special; Daring Mystery Comics 70th Anniversary Special	280	6 Jan 2010	Daniel Acuna cover: 978-0785138990

== See also ==
- Marvel omnibus
- Marvel Gallery Editions
- Marvel Epic Collections
- Marvel Premier Collection
- Marvel Premiere Classic
- Marvel Complete Collections
- Spider-Man collected editions
- Daredevil collected editions
- Marvel Masterworks
- DC Omnibuses
- DC Finest trade paperbacks
- DC Compact Comics
