= Marvel Premier Collection =

Line of full-color paperback comic books

Marvel Premier Collection is a line of full-color compact paperbacks, produced by Marvel Comics. They collecting various popular comic book series or storylines meant to be an easy introduction for readers to the Marvel Universe. The line was announced at the 2024 New York Comic Con, with the first collections released in February 2025. There have been fourteen collections released, with at least five more planned.

== Description ==
With a digest print run of 6 in × 9 in (150 mm × 230 mm), compared to a traditional 6 5/8 in × 10 1/4 in (170 mm × 260 mm) collected comic, the line was a response to 2024's DC Compact Comics launch. The DC version was "a hit with retailers and readers. Marvel Premier will have a higher price point at $14.99 but hopes to have a similar impact with readers." Marvel Comics announced the line at the 2024 New York Comic Con with four initial titles, with plans for X-Men comics to be included in the line after its initial wave.

Dan Buckley, President of Marvel Comics, said the collection "will be our go-to publishing line for any and all fans looking for a way into — or further into — the Marvel Universe. These titles will not be the only place to start of course, but they will be one of the best."

One of the first two releases was Daredevil: Born Again on February 4, 2025, to coincide with the release of the Marvel Cinematic Universe (MCU) television series, Daredevil: Born Again, exactly one month later. The book contained a new introduction from writer Frank Miller and foreword by actor Charlie Cox, who plays Matt Murdock / Daredevil in the MCU.

Comics analyst David Harper described the launch by saying: "The good thing is they're doing it, which is really the big win of it all."

== List of volumes ==
Title	Issues collected	Years covered	Main writer	Artist	Foreword	Pages	Released	ISBN
Black Panther: A Nation Under Our Feet	Black Panther (vol. 5) #1–12	2016–2017	Ta-Nehisi Coates	Brian Stelfreeze	Killer Mike	320	February 4, 2025	978-1302964856
Daredevil: Born Again	Daredevil (vol. 1) #226–233	1986	Frank Miller	David Mazzucchelli	Charlie Cox	280	February 4, 2025	978-1302965983
Captain America: The Winter Soldier	Captain America (vol. 5) #1–9, 11–14	2005–2006	Ed Brubaker	Steve Epting	Sebastian Stan	312	April 1, 2025	978-1302964863
Fantastic Four: Solve Everything	Material from: Fantastic Four (vol. 1) #570–588 (Note: Does not collect all of the listed issues. Between 0 and 20 pages are missing from each issue.)	2009–2011	Jonathan Hickman	Dale Eaglesham	Matt Shakman	392	June 3, 2025	978-1302964870
Civil War	Civil War #1–7	2006–2007	Mark Millar	Steve McNiven	Nate Moore	264	August 5, 2025	978-1302965549
Wolverine: Old Man Logan	Wolverine (vol. 3) #66–72; Wolverine: Old Man Logan Giant-Size (2009)	2008–2009	Mark Millar	Steve McNiven	Steve McNiven	256	October 21, 2025	978-1302965587
Hawkeye: My Life As A Weapon	Hawkeye (vol. 4) #1–11; Young Avengers Presents #6	2012–2013, 2008	Matt Fraction	David Aja	Matt Fraction	280	November 25, 2025	978-1302965556
Punisher: Welcome Back, Frank	The Punisher (vol. 5) #1–12	2000-2001	Garth Ennis	Steve Dillon, Jimmy Palmiotti	Jon Bernthal	288	March 10, 2026	978-1302969325
Planet Hulk	The Incredible Hulk (vol. 2) #92–105; material from Giant-Size Hulk #1	2006–2007	Greg Pak	Carlo Pagulayan, Aaron Lopresti, Gary Frank	Greg Pak	352	May 12, 2026	978-1302969097
The Visions	Vision (2015) #1–12	2015–2016	Tom King	Gabriel Hernandez Walta	Mike del Mundo	296	June 2, 2026	978-1302965570
Spider-Men: Worlds Collide	Spider-Men #1–5; Spider-Men II #1–5	2012, 2017	Brian Michael Bendis	Sara Pichelli	Phil Lord and Christopher Miller	256	July 7, 2026	978-1302965563
Avengers: Time Runs Out	Material from Avengers (2012) #35-44; New Avengers (2013) #24-33	2014-2015	Jonathan Hickman	Stefano Caselli, Mike Deodato Jr., Mike Mayhew, Valerio Schiti, Kev Walker, Szymon Kudranski, Dalibor Talajić & More	Joe and Anthony Russo	344	August 18, 2026	978-1302966690
Secret Wars	Secret Wars (2015) #1-9, Free Comic Book Day 2015 (Secret Wars) #0 (A story)	2015-2016	Jonathan Hickman	Esad Ribic	Kevin Feige	320	August 18, 2026	978-1302970291
All-New X-Men: Yesterday's X-Men	All-New X-Men (2012) #1-10	2012-2013	Brian Michael Bendis	Stuart Immonen, David Marquez	Brian Michael Bendis	256	October 6, 2026	978-1302970567
Captain America: The Death of Captain America	Captain America (Vol. 5) #22-30, Winter Soldier: Winter Kills #1 (2006)	2007-2008	Ed Brubaker	Steve Epting, Mike Perkins	TBA	272	November 3, 2026	978-1302970574
Iron Man: Extremis	Iron Man (2004) #1-6, Iron Man (2012) #1-5	2005-2012	Warren Ellis, Kieron Gillen	Adi Granov, Greg Land	TBA	304	January 12, 2027	978-1302972523
Spider-Man: Kraven's Last Hunt	Web of Spider-Man (1985) #31-32; Amazing Spider-Man (1963) #293-294; Peter Parker, The Spectacular Spider-Man (1976) #131-132; Amazing Spider-Man: Soul of the Hunter (1992) #1; Material from Sensational Spider-Man Annual '96	1987 - 1996	J.M. DeMatteis	Mike Zeck, Shawn McManus	J.M. DeMatteis	256	February 9, 2027	978-1302972530
Thor: Gorr the God Butcher	Thor: God of Thunder (2013) #1-11	2012 - 2013	Jason Aaron	Esad Ribic, Butch Guice	TBA	280	March 9, 2027	978-1302972547
X-Men: E Is For Extinction	New X-Men (2001) #114-126	2001-2002	Grant Morrison	Frank Quitely, Ethan Van Sciver, Igor Kordey & Tom Derenick	TBA	336	April 13, 2027	978-1302972554

== Sales ==
Following its release at the start of February, Daredevil: Born Again entered ICv2's monthly direct market graphic novel chart at number two, outsold only by the first volume of Marvel's relaunched series, The Ultimates. The direct market chart covers sales in specialist retailers, such as comic shops.

The book also debuted at number two in the Bookscan chart, which covers sales in traditional bookstores.

By April, Daredevil: Born Again had reached number one in Bookscan's chart, with Captain America: The Winter Soldier at three.

== See also ==
- DC Compact Comics
- Marvel Epic Collection
- Marvel Omnibus
- Marvel oversized hardcovers
- Marvel Gallery Editions
- Marvel Complete Collections
- Marvel Masterworks
- Daredevil collected editions
- Spider-Man collected editions
- DC Omnibus
- DC Finest trade paperbacks
