= Marvel Premiere Classic =

Series of Comic Collections

Marvel Premiere Classic was a series of hardcover comic book collected editions, that reproduced Marvel Comics storylines.

Marvel's Associate Editor of Special Projects Mark Beazley, promised: "definitive collection(s) of the stories along with as much behind the scenes extras as we can possibly dig up". Between 2006 and August 2013, 107 volumes were released, with a goal to "compile selected storylines from ... five decades of Marvel history".

Each book featured a standard cover and a numbered "limited-print, numbered variant" for the comic book direct market. These variants were only available in comic shops, or via specialist retailers. They sported a matching trade dress design, and a number on the back to indicate how many copies were printed.

The first release, Kraven's Last Hunt, debuted in the August 2006 graphic novel chart at No.18, with approximately 3,500 copies sold.

Volume 94, Deathlok: The Living Nightmare Of Michael Collins, had the smallest print run, with only 315 copies produced.

The Avengers has the most releases, with 17, then X-Men with 15. Spider-Man was the most-collected non-team book, with 10.

DC Comics' had an equivalent line, the DC Comics Classics Library, which launched in 2009. Only nine hardbacks were released, before cancellation a year later

Marvel's own series was cancelled in August 2012 with the 106th volume. One final book - X-Factor: Phalanx Covenant - was solicited in February 2013 for an August release.

The 10.5 x 7.25in (26.67 x 18.42cm) Premiere Hardcover format size was gradually phased out entirely by Marvel, with a great number of books liquidated across the summer of 2012.

In September 2013, Marvel launched the Epic Collection line, with a collected edition paperback released once or twice a month.

The company's next attempt to collect storylines, on a regular basis, in hardcover, was the Gallery Editions format, which launched in 2019.

== Releases ==
Direct market spine color indicated in DM copies column
#	Character	Title	Material from	Material collected	Released	DM copies printed	ISBN
1	Spider-Man	Kraven's Last Hunt	1987	Web of Spider-Man #31–32, Amazing Spider-Man #293–294, Peter Parker, the Spectacular Spider-Man #131–132	Aug 2006	2,000	HC: 978-0785123309
1	Spider-Man	Kraven's Last Hunt	1987	Web of Spider-Man #31–32, Amazing Spider-Man #293–294, Peter Parker, the Spectacular Spider-Man #131–132	Aug 2006	2,000	DM: 978-0785124009
2	Wolverine	Wolverine Origin	2001–2002	Wolverine: Origin #1–6	Oct 2006	2,300	HC: 978-0785123286
2	Wolverine	Wolverine Origin	2001–2002	Wolverine: Origin #1–6	Oct 2006	2,300	DM: 978-0785124382
3	Wolverine	Wolverine	1982	Wolverine #1–4, Uncanny X-Men #172–173	Dec 2006	2,000	HC: 978-0785123293
3	Wolverine	Wolverine	1982	Wolverine #1–4, Uncanny X-Men #172–173	Dec 2006	2,000	DM: 978-0785125723
4	Spider-Man	Death Of The Stacys	1970–1971, 1973	Amazing Spider-Man #88–92, 121–122	Feb 2007	1,600	HC: 978-0785125044
4	Spider-Man	Death Of The Stacys	1970–1971, 1973	Amazing Spider-Man #88–92, 121–122	Feb 2007	1,600	DM: 978-0785125051
5	Wolverine	Weapon X	1991	Marvel Comics Presents #72–84	Mar 2007	2,000	HC: 978-0785123279
5	Wolverine	Weapon X	1991	Marvel Comics Presents #72–84	Mar 2007	2,000	DM: 978-0785126676
6	The Avengers	Defenders War	1973	Avengers #115–118, Defenders #8–11	Sep 2007	1,500	HC: 978-0785127598
6	The Avengers	Defenders War	1973	Avengers #115–118, Defenders #8–11	Sep 2007	1,500	DM: 978-0785127604
7	X-Men	X-Men: God Loves, Man Kills	1982	Marvel Graphic Novel No. 5 - X-Men: God Loves, Man Kills	Nov 2007	1,917	HC: 978-0785127611
7	X-Men	X-Men: God Loves, Man Kills	1982	Marvel Graphic Novel No. 5 - X-Men: God Loves, Man Kills	Nov 2007	1,917	DM: 978-0785128038
8	The Hulk	The End	1992–1993, 2002	Incredible Hulk: Future Imperfect #1–2, Hulk: The End	Feb 2008	1,917	HC: 978-0785130260
8	The Hulk	The End	1992–1993, 2002	Incredible Hulk: Future Imperfect #1–2, Hulk: The End	Feb 2008	1,917	DM: 978-0785130307
9	Iron Man	Demon In A Bottle	1979	Iron Man #120–128	Mar 2008	1,400	HC: 978-0785130956
9	Iron Man	Demon In A Bottle	1979	Iron Man #120–128	Mar 2008	1,400	DM: 978-0785130963
10	Iron Man	Doomquest	1981, 1989	Iron Man #149–150 and 249–250	Mar 2008	1,000	HC: 978-0785128342
10	Iron Man	Doomquest	1981, 1989	Iron Man #149–150 and 249–250	Mar 2008	1,000	DM: 978-0785128359
11	The Punisher	Circle Of Blood	1986	Punisher #1–5	Apr 2008	1,525	HC: 978-0785123316
11	The Punisher	Circle Of Blood	1986	Punisher #1–5	Apr 2008	1,525	DM: 978-0785126683
12	X-Men	Kitty Pryde and Wolverine	1984–1985	Kitty Pryde And Wolverine #1–6	Jul 2008	1,300	HC: 978-0785130895
12	X-Men	Kitty Pryde and Wolverine	1984–1985	Kitty Pryde And Wolverine #1–6	Jul 2008	1,300	DM: 978-0785130901
13	The Marvel Universe	Marvels	1994	Marvels #0–4	Jun 2008	1,790	HC: 978-0785127840
13	The Marvel Universe	Marvels	1994	Marvels #0–4	Jun 2008	1,790	DM: 978-0785127857
14	X-Men	Longshot	1985–1986	Longshot #1–6	Oct 2008	1,515	HC: 978-0785130918
14	X-Men	Longshot	1985–1986	Longshot #1–6	Oct 2008	1,515	DM: 978-0785130925
15	The Hulk	Heart Of The Atom	1971–1972, 1971–1972, 1976–1977, 1980	Incredible Hulk (vol. 2) #140, 148, 156, 202–203, 205–207, 246–248; What If #23	Oct 2008	1,088	HC: 978-0785130871
15	The Hulk	Heart Of The Atom	1971–1972, 1971–1972, 1976–1977, 1980	Incredible Hulk (vol. 2) #140, 148, 156, 202–203, 205–207, 246–248; What If #23	Oct 2008	1,088	DM: 978-0785130888
16	X-Men	Magik: Storm and Illyana	1983–1984	Magik #1–4	Nov 2008	1,000	HC: 978-0785130932
16	X-Men	Magik: Storm and Illyana	1983–1984	Magik #1–4	Nov 2008	1,000	DM: 978-0785130949
17	The Avengers	First To Last	1995, 2007–2008	The Last Avengers Story #1–2 and, Avengers Classic #1–12	Dec 2008	1,100	HC: 978-0785136521
17	The Avengers	First To Last	1995, 2007–2008	The Last Avengers Story #1–2 and, Avengers Classic #1–12	Dec 2008	1,100	DM: 978-0785136606
18	Daredevil	Daredevil: The Man Without Fear	1993	Daredevil: The Man Without Fear #1–5	Dec 2008	2,092	HC: 978-0785134787
18	Daredevil	Daredevil: The Man Without Fear	1993	Daredevil: The Man Without Fear #1–5	Dec 2008	2,092	DM: 978-0785136569
19	Daredevil	Born Again	1986–1987	Daredevil #226–233	Jan 2009	1,229	HC: 978-0785134800
19	Daredevil	Born Again	1986–1987	Daredevil #226–233	Jan 2009	1,229	DM: 978-0785136552
20	Wolverine	Not Dead Yet	1997–1998	Wolverine (vol. 2) #119–122	Apr 2009	995	HC: 978-0785137665
20	Wolverine	Not Dead Yet	1997–1998	Wolverine (vol. 2) #119–122	Apr 2009	995	DM: 978-0785137672
21	X-Men	Proteus	1979, 1989	X-Men #125–128, Classic X-Men #32–33 and 36	Apr 2009	894	HC: 978-0785137689
21	X-Men	Proteus	1979, 1989	X-Men #125–128, Classic X-Men #32–33 and 36	Apr 2009	894	DM: 978-0785137696
22	The Avengers	Hawkeye	1964, 1976, 1979–1980, 1983	Hawkeye #1–4, Tales of Suspense #57, Marvel Super Action #1, Avengers #189, Marvel Team-Up #95	Mar 2009	800	HC: 978-0785139379
22	The Avengers	Hawkeye	1964, 1976, 1979–1980, 1983	Hawkeye #1–4, Tales of Suspense #57, Marvel Super Action #1, Avengers #189, Marvel Team-Up #95	Mar 2009	800	DM: 978-0785159407
23	Cloak And Dagger	Child Of Darkness, Child Of Light	1983–1984	Cloak and Dagger #1–4	May 2009	984	HC: 978-0785137832
23	Cloak And Dagger	Child Of Darkness, Child Of Light	1983–1984	Cloak and Dagger #1–4	May 2009	984	DM: 978-0785137849
24	Guardians Of The Galaxy	Earth Shall Overcome	1969, 1974–1975	Marvel Super-Heroes #18, Marvel Two-in-One #4–5, Giant-Size Defenders #5, Defenders #26–29	Apr 2009	1,056	HC: 978-0785137863
24	Guardians Of The Galaxy	Earth Shall Overcome	1969, 1974–1975	Marvel Super-Heroes #18, Marvel Two-in-One #4–5, Giant-Size Defenders #5, Defenders #26–29	Apr 2009	1,056	DM: 978-0785137870
25	X-Men	Phoenix Rising	1986–1987, 1990	Avengers #263, Fantastic Four #286, X-Factor #1, Classic X-Men #8, 43	Jun 2009	800	HC: 978-0785139485
25	X-Men	Phoenix Rising	1986–1987, 1990	Avengers #263, Fantastic Four #286, X-Factor #1, Classic X-Men #8, 43	Jun 2009	800	DM: 978-0785139492
26	Guardians Of The Galaxy	The Power Of Starhawk	1976–1977	Marvel Presents #3–12	Jul 2009	1,070	HC: 978-0785137887
26	Guardians Of The Galaxy	The Power Of Starhawk	1976–1977	Marvel Presents #3–12	Jul 2009	1,070	DM: 978-0785137894
27	Spider-Man	Torment	1990	Spider-Man #1–5, material from Marvel Age #90	Jul 2009	1,255	HC: 978-0785137917
27	Spider-Man	Torment	1990	Spider-Man #1–5, material from Marvel Age #90	Jul 2009	1,255	DM: 978-0785137924
28	Black Widow	The Sting Of The Widow	1964, 1970–1971	Tales of Suspense #52, Amazing Spider-Man #86, Amazing Adventures (vol. 2) #1–8, Daredevil #81	Aug 2009	800	HC: 978-0785137948
28	Black Widow	The Sting Of The Widow	1964, 1970–1971	Tales of Suspense #52, Amazing Spider-Man #86, Amazing Adventures (vol. 2) #1–8, Daredevil #81	Aug 2009	800	DM: 978-0785137955
29	Thor	Balder The Brave	1985–1986	Balder The Brave #1–4, Thor #360–362	Aug 2009	900	HC: 978-0785138853
29	Thor	Balder The Brave	1985–1986	Balder The Brave #1–4, Thor #360–362	Aug 2009	900	DM: 978-0785138860
30	Hercules	Hercules: Prince Of Power	1982, 1984	Hercules: Prince Of Power #1–4, Hercules: Prince Of Power (vol. 2) #1–4	Sep 2009	607	HC: 978-0785139553
30	Hercules	Hercules: Prince Of Power	1982, 1984	Hercules: Prince Of Power #1–4, Hercules: Prince Of Power (vol. 2) #1–4	Sep 2009	607	DM: 978-0785139560
31	Spider-Man	Sinister Six	1964, 1990	Amazing Spider-Man Annual #1, Amazing Spider-Man #334–339	Sep 2009	950	HC: 978-0785137979
31	Spider-Man	Sinister Six	1964, 1990	Amazing Spider-Man Annual #1, Amazing Spider-Man #334–339	Sep 2009	950	DM: 978-0785137986
32	Mephisto	Mephisto vs. the Fantastic Four, X-Factor, X-Men, and the Avengers	1987	Mephisto vs. the Fantastic Four #1, Mephisto vs. X-Factor #2, Mephisto vs. X-Men #3, Mephisto vs. the Avengers #4	Oct 2009	689	HC: 978-0785138044
32	Mephisto	Mephisto vs. the Fantastic Four, X-Factor, X-Men, and the Avengers	1987	Mephisto vs. the Fantastic Four #1, Mephisto vs. X-Factor #2, Mephisto vs. X-Men #3, Mephisto vs. the Avengers #4	Oct 2009	689	DM: 978-0785137788
33	X-Men	Wolverine/Gambit	1995	Wolverine/Gambit: Victims #1–4	Nov 2009	943	HC: 978-0785138020
33	X-Men	Wolverine/Gambit	1995	Wolverine/Gambit: Victims #1–4	Nov 2009	943	DM: 978-0785138037
34	Hercules	Full Circle	1983, 1987–1988, 1990	Marvel Tales #197, Marvel Graphic Novel No. 37 - Hercules: Prince of Power - Full Circle, Marvel Comics Presents #39–41, Marvel Age #4 and 65	Nov 2009	981	HC: 978-0785139577
34	Hercules	Full Circle	1983, 1987–1988, 1990	Marvel Tales #197, Marvel Graphic Novel No. 37 - Hercules: Prince of Power - Full Circle, Marvel Comics Presents #39–41, Marvel Age #4 and 65	Nov 2009	981	DM: 978-0785139584
35	X-Men	X-Men vs. Avengers	1965, 1987	Uncanny X-Men #9, X-Men vs. Avengers #1–4	Jan 2010	804	HC: 978-0785138099
35	X-Men	X-Men vs. Avengers	1965, 1987	Uncanny X-Men #9, X-Men vs. Avengers #1–4	Jan 2010	804	DM: 978-0785138105
36	X-Men	X-Men vs. Fantastic Four	1965, 1987	Fantastic Four #28, Fantastic Four vs. X-Men #1–4	Jan 2010	796	HC: 978-0785138075
36	X-Men	X-Men vs. Fantastic Four	1965, 1987	Fantastic Four #28, Fantastic Four vs. X-Men #1–4	Jan 2010	796	DM: 978-0785138082
37	The Thing	Project Pegasus	1978–1979	Marvel Two-in-One #42–43, 53–58	Jan 2010	945	HC: 978-0785138112
37	The Thing	Project Pegasus	1978–1979	Marvel Two-in-One #42–43, 53–58	Jan 2010	945	DM: 978-0785138129
38	The Avengers	The Korvac Saga	1977–1978	Avengers #167–177, Thor Annual #6	Feb 2010	749	HC: 978-0785144717
38	The Avengers	The Korvac Saga	1977–1978	Avengers #167–177, Thor Annual #6	Feb 2010	749	DM: 978-0785144700
39	Fantastic Four	In Search Of Galactus	1979–1980	Fantastic Four #204–214	Feb 2010	792	HC: 978-0785137344
39	Fantastic Four	In Search Of Galactus	1979–1980	Fantastic Four #204–214	Feb 2010	792	DM: 978-0785141778
40	Black Widow	Web Of Intrigue	1981, 1983–1984, 1990	Marvel Fanfare #10–13, material from Bizarre Adventures #25; Marvel Graphic Novel No. 61 - The Black Widow: The Coldest War	Mar 2010	700	HC: 978-0785144748
40	Black Widow	Web Of Intrigue	1981, 1983–1984, 1990	Marvel Fanfare #10–13, material from Bizarre Adventures #25; Marvel Graphic Novel No. 61 - The Black Widow: The Coldest War	Mar 2010	700	DM: 978-0785144755
41	Iron Man	Iron Monger	1985	Iron Man #193–200	Mar 2010	700	HC: 978-0785142607
41	Iron Man	Iron Monger	1985	Iron Man #193–200	Mar 2010	700	DM: 978-0785142881
42	Iron Man	Deadly Solutions	1998	Iron Man (vol. 3) #1–7	Apr 2010	775	HC: 978-0785142584
42	Iron Man	Deadly Solutions	1998	Iron Man (vol. 3) #1–7	Apr 2010	775	DM: 978-0785142898
43	Captain Marvel	The Death Of Captain Marvel	1974, 1979, 1982	Captain Marvel #34, Marvel Spotlight #1–2, Marvel Graphic Novel No. 1 - The Death of Captain Marvel	May 2010	844	HC: 978-0785146278
43	Captain Marvel	The Death Of Captain Marvel	1974, 1979, 1982	Captain Marvel #34, Marvel Spotlight #1–2, Marvel Graphic Novel No. 1 - The Death of Captain Marvel	May 2010	844	DM: 978-0785146285
44	The Avengers	West Coast Avengers Assemble	1984, 1993	West Coast Avengers #1–4, Avengers #250, Iron Man Annual #7, material from Avengers West Coast #100 and Avengers #239, 243–244, 246	May 2010	781	HC: 978-0785143215
44	The Avengers	West Coast Avengers Assemble	1984, 1993	West Coast Avengers #1–4, Avengers #250, Iron Man Annual #7, material from Avengers West Coast #100 and Avengers #239, 243–244, 246	May 2010	781	DM: 978-0785143222
45	The Avengers	The Contest	1982, 1987	Marvel Super Hero Contest of Champions #1–3, West Coast Avengers Annual #2, Avengers Annual #16	Jun 2010	833	HC: 978-0785145066
45	The Avengers	The Contest	1982, 1987	Marvel Super Hero Contest of Champions #1–3, West Coast Avengers Annual #2, Avengers Annual #16	Jun 2010	833	DM: 978-0785145073
46	The Marvel Universe	Infinity Gauntlet	1991	Infinity Gauntlet #1–6	Jul 2010	1,376	HC: 978-0785145493
46	The Marvel Universe	Infinity Gauntlet	1991	Infinity Gauntlet #1–6	Jul 2010	1,376	DM: 978-0785145509
47	Silver Surfer	Rebirth of Thanos	1990	Silver Surfer (vol. 3) #34–38, The Thanos Quest #1–2, material from Logan's Run #6	Jul 2010	901	HC: 978-0785144786
47	Silver Surfer	Rebirth of Thanos	1990	Silver Surfer (vol. 3) #34–38, The Thanos Quest #1–2, material from Logan's Run #6	Jul 2010	901	DM: 978-0785144793
48	X-Men	Mutant Genesis	1991–1992	X-Men (vol. 2) #1–7	Jul 2010	954	HC: 978-0785146728
48	X-Men	Mutant Genesis	1991–1992	X-Men (vol. 2) #1–7	Jul 2010	954	DM: 978-0785146735
49	Thor	The Warriors Three	1976, 1987–1988	Marvel Spotlight #30; Marvel Fanfare #30, 34–37	Aug 2010	725	HC: 978-0785144809
49	Thor	The Warriors Three	1976, 1987–1988	Marvel Spotlight #30; Marvel Fanfare #30, 34–37	Aug 2010	725	DM: 978-0785144816
50	Moon Knight	Countdown To Dark	1979–1980	The Hulk! magazine #13–15, 17–18, 20–21; Marvel Preview #21	Aug 2010	892	HC: 978-0785148692
50	Moon Knight	Countdown To Dark	1979–1980	The Hulk! magazine #13–15, 17–18, 20–21; Marvel Preview #21	Aug 2010	892	DM: 978-0785148708
51	The Avengers	Under Siege	1986–1987	Avengers #270–277	Nov 2010	716	HC: 978-0785143826
51	The Avengers	Under Siege	1986–1987	Avengers #270–277	Nov 2010	716	DM:
52	The Marvel Universe	Marvel Universe: The End	2003	Marvel: The End #1–6	Nov 2010	804	HC: 978-0785145714
52	The Marvel Universe	Marvel Universe: The End	2003	Marvel: The End #1–6	Nov 2010	804	DM: 978-0785145721
53	Fantastic Four	Resurrection Of Galactus	2001–2002	Fantastic Four (vol. 4) #46–50, Fantastic Four Annual 2001	Dec 2010	723	HC: 978-0785144762
53	Fantastic Four	Resurrection Of Galactus	2001–2002	Fantastic Four (vol. 4) #46–50, Fantastic Four Annual 2001	Dec 2010	723	DM: 978-0785144779
54	Thor	If Asgard Should Perish	1975–1976	Thor #242–253	Dec 2010	793	HC: 978-0785149774
54	Thor	If Asgard Should Perish	1975–1976	Thor #242–253	Dec 2010	793	DM: 978-0785149927
55	X-Force	Cable & The New Mutants	1989–1990	New Mutants #86–94, New Mutants Annual #5	Jan 2011	961	HC: 978-0785149705
55	X-Force	Cable & The New Mutants	1989–1990	New Mutants #86–94, New Mutants Annual #5	Jan 2011	961	DM: 978-0785150084
56	The Avengers	The Coming Of The Beast	1975–1976	Avengers #137–140, 145–146	Jan 2011	660	HC: 978-0785144687
56	The Avengers	The Coming Of The Beast	1975–1976	Avengers #137–140, 145–146	Jan 2011	660	DM: 978-0785144694
57	Captain America	War & Remembrance	1980–1981	Captain America #247–255	Jan 2011	700	HC: 978-0785149668
57	Captain America	War & Remembrance	1980–1981	Captain America #247–255	Jan 2011	700	DM: 978-0785149910
58	Thor	Worldengine	1995	Thor #491–494, Journey into Mystery #103	Jan 2011	695	HC: 978-0785149828
58	Thor	Worldengine	1995	Thor #491–494, Journey into Mystery #103	Jan 2011	695	DM: 978-0785149941
59	X-Force	A Force To Be Reckoned With	1991	New Mutants #98–100, X-Force #1–4, Spider-Man #16	Jan 2011	594	HC: 978-0785149842
59	X-Force	A Force To Be Reckoned With	1991	New Mutants #98–100, X-Force #1–4, Spider-Man #16	Jan 2011	594	DM: 978-0785150749
60	Thor	The Quest For Odin	1977	Thor #255–266	Feb 2011	675	HC: 978-0785149811
60	Thor	The Quest For Odin	1977	Thor #255–266	Feb 2011	675	DM: 978-0785149934
61	X-Force	Under The Gun	1991–1992	X-Force #5–15, X-Force Annual #1	Mar 2011	505	HC: 978-0785149859
61	X-Force	Under The Gun	1991–1992	X-Force #5–15, X-Force Annual #1	Mar 2011	505	DM: 978-0785150756
62	Captain America	Operation: Rebirth	1995–1996	Captain America #444–448, 450–454	Apr 2011	590	HC: 978-0785150800
62	Captain America	Operation: Rebirth	1995–1996	Captain America #444–448, 450–454	Apr 2011	590	DM: 978-0785150817
63	Thor	The Warriors Three Unleashed	1966, 1989–1990, 1992–1993, 1997	Thor #400, 410, 415–416; Thor Annual #2, 17; Marvel Comics Presents #66; Marvel Super-Heroes #15; Journey into Mystery #-1	Apr 2011	645	HC: 978-0785150763
63	Thor	The Warriors Three Unleashed	1966, 1989–1990, 1992–1993, 1997	Thor #400, 410, 415–416; Thor Annual #2, 17; Marvel Comics Presents #66; Marvel Super-Heroes #15; Journey into Mystery #-1	Apr 2011	645	DM: 978-0785150770
64	The Avengers	West Coast Avengers: Family Ties	1985–1986	West Coast Avengers #1–9, The Vision and the Scarlet Witch #1–2	May 2011	510	HC: 978-0785155003
64	The Avengers	West Coast Avengers: Family Ties	1985–1986	West Coast Avengers #1–9, The Vision and the Scarlet Witch #1–2	May 2011	510	DM: 978-0785155010
65	Captain America	To Serve And Protect	1998	Captain America (vol. 3) #1–7	May 2011	535	HC: 978-0785150824
65	Captain America	To Serve And Protect	1998	Captain America (vol. 3) #1–7	May 2011	535	DM: 978-0785150831
66	X-Men	Alpha Flight	1978–1980, 1985–1986, 1998	X-Men/Alpha Flight #1–2, X-Men/Alpha Flight (vol. 2) #1–2, X-Men #109, 120–121, 139–140	May 2011	534	HC: 978-0785155133
66	X-Men	Alpha Flight	1978–1980, 1985–1986, 1998	X-Men/Alpha Flight #1–2, X-Men/Alpha Flight (vol. 2) #1–2, X-Men #109, 120–121, 139–140	May 2011	534	DM: 978-0785155140
67	Captain America	American Nightmare	1998–1999	Captain America (vol. 3) #8–13, Captain America/Citizen V Annual 1998	Jun 2011	335	HC: 978-0785150848
67	Captain America	American Nightmare	1998–1999	Captain America (vol. 3) #8–13, Captain America/Citizen V Annual 1998	Jun 2011	335	DM: 978-0785150855
68	Dr Strange	Into The Dark Dimension	1984–1985	Doctor Strange (vol. 2) #68–74	Jun 2011	471	HC: 978-0785155058
68	Dr Strange	Into The Dark Dimension	1984–1985	Doctor Strange (vol. 2) #68–74	Jun 2011	471	DM: 978-0785155065
69	The Thing	Liberty Legion	1976	Invaders #5–6, Marvel Premiere #29–30, Fantastic Four Annual #11, Marvel Two-in-One Annual #1, Marvel Two-in-One #20	Jul 2011	650	HC: 978-0785155157
69	The Thing	Liberty Legion	1976	Invaders #5–6, Marvel Premiere #29–30, Fantastic Four Annual #11, Marvel Two-in-One Annual #1, Marvel Two-in-One #20	Jul 2011	650	DM: 978-0785155164
70	Spider-Man	The Death Of Jean DeWolff	1985-1986, 1988	Peter Parker, the Spectacular Spider-Man #107–110, Spectacular Spider-Man #134–136	Aug 2011	711	HC: 978-0785157212
70	Spider-Man	The Death Of Jean DeWolff	1985-1986, 1988	Peter Parker, the Spectacular Spider-Man #107–110, Spectacular Spider-Man #134–136	Aug 2011	711	DM: 978-0785157229
71	X-Men	Lifedeath	1969, 1984–1987	X-Men #53 and Uncanny X-Men #186, 198, 205 and 214	Jul 2011	711	HC: 978-0785155249
71	X-Men	Lifedeath	1969, 1984–1987	X-Men #53 and Uncanny X-Men #186, 198, 205 and 214	Jul 2011	711	DM: 978-0785155256
72	Rocket Raccoon	Guardian Of The Keystone Quadrant	1976, 1982, 1985	Marvel Preview #7, Incredible Hulk (vol. 2) #271, Rocket Raccoon #1–4	Aug 2011	575	HC: 978-0785155270
72	Rocket Raccoon	Guardian Of The Keystone Quadrant	1976, 1982, 1985	Marvel Preview #7, Incredible Hulk (vol. 2) #271, Rocket Raccoon #1–4	Aug 2011	575	DM: 978-0785155287
73	X-Men	Fallen Angels	1987	X-Men: Fallen Angels #1–8	Aug 2011	775	HC: 978-0785155294
73	X-Men	Fallen Angels	1987	X-Men: Fallen Angels #1–8	Aug 2011	775	DM: 978-0785155300
74	The Avengers	Assault On Olympus	1987	Avengers #278–285	Sep 2011	500	HC: 978-0785155331
74	The Avengers	Assault On Olympus	1987	Avengers #278–285	Sep 2011	500	DM: 978-0785155348
75	Fantastic Four	The Overthrow Of Doom	1978	Fantastic Four #192–200	Sep 2011	550	HC: 978-0785156055
75	Fantastic Four	The Overthrow Of Doom	1978	Fantastic Four #192–200	Sep 2011	550	DM: 978-0785156062
76	Captain America	Red Glare	1999	Captain America (vol. 3) #14–19, Captain America Spotlight	Oct 2011	570	HC: 978-0785158943
76	Captain America	Red Glare	1999	Captain America (vol. 3) #14–19, Captain America Spotlight	Oct 2011	570	DM: 978-0785158950
77	Fantastic Four	Fantastic Four 1234	2001–2002	Fantastic Four 1234 #1–4, material from Marvel Knights Double-Shot #2	Oct 2011	590	HC: 978-0785158967
77	Fantastic Four	Fantastic Four 1234	2001–2002	Fantastic Four 1234 #1–4, material from Marvel Knights Double-Shot #2	Oct 2011	590	DM: 978-0785158974
78	Black Widow	The Itsy-Bitsy Spider	1999, 2001	Black Widow #1–3, Black Widow (vol. 2) #1–3	Nov 2011	600	HC: 978-0785158271
78	Black Widow	The Itsy-Bitsy Spider	1999, 2001	Black Widow #1–3, Black Widow (vol. 2) #1–3	Nov 2011	600	DM: 978-0785158288
79	X-Force	Assault On Graymalkin	1993	New Warriors #31, X-Force #19–25	Nov 2011	600	HC: 978-0785158998
79	X-Force	Assault On Graymalkin	1993	New Warriors #31, X-Force #19–25	Nov 2011	600	DM: 978-0785160267
80	The Avengers	West Coast Avengers: Sins Of The Past	1986–1987	West Coast Avengers #10–16, West Coast Avengers Annual #1, Avengers Annual #15	Dec 2011	560	HC: 978-0785159001
80	The Avengers	West Coast Avengers: Sins Of The Past	1986–1987	West Coast Avengers #10–16, West Coast Avengers Annual #1, Avengers Annual #15	Dec 2011	560	DM: 978-0785160274
81	S.H.I.E.L.D.	Nick Fury vs. S.H.I.E.L.D.	1988	Nick Fury vs. S.H.I.E.L.D. #1–6	Dec 2011	530	HC: 978-0785185000
81	S.H.I.E.L.D.	Nick Fury vs. S.H.I.E.L.D.	1988	Nick Fury vs. S.H.I.E.L.D. #1–6	Dec 2011	530	DM: 978-0785162445
82	The Avengers/X-Men	Avengers/X-Men: Bloodties	1993, 1996	Avengers #368–369, X-Men (vol. 2) #26, Avengers West Coast #101, Uncanny X-Men #307, Black Knight: Exodus	Jan 2012	445	HC: 978-0785161271
82	The Avengers/X-Men	Avengers/X-Men: Bloodties	1993, 1996	Avengers #368–369, X-Men (vol. 2) #26, Avengers West Coast #101, Uncanny X-Men #307, Black Knight: Exodus	Jan 2012	445	DM: 978-0785161288
83	Spider-Man	Masques	1991	Spider-Man #6–7, 13–14, 16; X-Force #4	Jan 2012	600	HC: 978-0785159438
83	Spider-Man	Masques	1991	Spider-Man #6–7, 13–14, 16; X-Force #4	Jan 2012	600	DM: 978-0785159445
84	The Avengers	Hawkeye: Earth's Mightiest Marksman	1994, 1998	Hawkeye (vol. 2) #1–4, Hawkeye: Earth's Mightiest Marksman, material from Marvel Comics Presents #159–161	Feb 2012	380	HC: 978-0785159391
84	The Avengers	Hawkeye: Earth's Mightiest Marksman	1994, 1998	Hawkeye (vol. 2) #1–4, Hawkeye: Earth's Mightiest Marksman, material from Marvel Comics Presents #159–161	Feb 2012	380	DM: 978-0785159407
85	Elektra	Elektra: Assassin	1986–1987	Elektra: Assassin #1–8	Mar 2012	720	HC: 978-0785163541
85	Elektra	Elektra: Assassin	1986–1987	Elektra: Assassin #1–8	Mar 2012	720	DM: 978-0785163558
86	The Avengers	West Coast Avengers: Lost In Space-Time	1963, 1982, 1987	Fantastic Four #19, Doctor Strange (vol. 2) #53, West Coast Avengers #17-24	Mar 2012	372	HC: 978-0785162216
86	The Avengers	West Coast Avengers: Lost In Space-Time	1963, 1982, 1987	Fantastic Four #19, Doctor Strange (vol. 2) #53, West Coast Avengers #17-24	Mar 2012	372	DM: 978-0785162223
87	The Avengers	The Serpent Crown	1975–1976	Avengers #141–144, 147–149	Apr 2012	410	HC: 978-0785157519
87	The Avengers	The Serpent Crown	1975–1976	Avengers #141–144, 147–149	Apr 2012	410	DM: 978-0785157526
88	X-Force	Toy Soldiers	1993–1994	X-Force #26–31, X-Force Annual #2, Nomad #20	Apr 2012	440	HC: 978-0785162193
88	X-Force	Toy Soldiers	1993–1994	X-Force #26–31, X-Force Annual #2, Nomad #20	Apr 2012	440	DM: 9780785162209
89	The Avengers	The Private War Of Dr. Doom	1976–1977	Avengers #150–156, Avengers Annual #6, Super-Villain Team-Up #9	May 2012	490	HC: 978-0785162353
89	The Avengers	The Private War Of Dr. Doom	1976–1977	Avengers #150–156, Avengers Annual #6, Super-Villain Team-Up #9	May 2012	490	DM: 978-0785162360
90	The Hulk	Return Of The Monster	2001–2002	Incredible Hulk (vol. 2) #34–39, Startling Stories: Banner #1–4	May 2012	410	HC: 978-0785153467
90	The Hulk	Return Of The Monster	2001–2002	Incredible Hulk (vol. 2) #34–39, Startling Stories: Banner #1–4	May 2012	410	DM: 978-0785153474
91	Silver Surfer	Parable	1988–1990	Silver Surfer #1-2 (Epic Comics miniseries), Silver Surfer: The Enslavers	May 2012	640	HC: 978-0785162094
91	Silver Surfer	Parable	1988–1990	Silver Surfer #1-2 (Epic Comics miniseries), Silver Surfer: The Enslavers	May 2012	640	DM: 978-0785162100
92	The Thing	The Serpent Crown Affair	1980	Marvel Two-in-One #64–67, Marvel Team-Up Annual #5	May 2012	395	HC: 978-0785157618
92	The Thing	The Serpent Crown Affair	1980	Marvel Two-in-One #64–67, Marvel Team-Up Annual #5	May 2012	395	DM: 978-0785157625
93	Cloak And Dagger	Crime And Punishment	1982-1984	Peter Parker, the Spectacular Spider-Man #64, 69–70, 81–82 and 94–96, Marvel Team-Up Annual #6, Marvel Fanfare #19	Jun 2012	360	HC: 978-0785161295
93	Cloak And Dagger	Crime And Punishment	1982-1984	Peter Parker, the Spectacular Spider-Man #64, 69–70, 81–82 and 94–96, Marvel Team-Up Annual #6, Marvel Fanfare #19	Jun 2012	360	DM: 978-0785161301
94	Deathlok	The Living Nightmare Of Michael Collins	1990	Deathlok #1–4	Jun 2012	315	HC: 978-0785159889
94	Deathlok	The Living Nightmare Of Michael Collins	1990	Deathlok #1–4	Jun 2012	315	DM: 978-0785159896
95	Spider-Man	Perceptions	1990	Spider-Man #8–12	Jun 2012	420	HC: 978-0785160526
95	Spider-Man	Perceptions	1990	Spider-Man #8–12	Jun 2012	420	DM: 978-0785160533
96	The Avengers	West Coast Avengers: Zodiac Attack	1987	West Coast Avengers #25–30, West Coast Avengers Annual #2, Avengers Annual #16	Jul 2012	375	HC: 978-0785162537
96	The Avengers	West Coast Avengers: Zodiac Attack	1987	West Coast Avengers #25–30, West Coast Avengers Annual #2, Avengers Annual #16	Jul 2012	375	DM: 978-0785162544
97	Spider-Man	Return Of The Burglar	1979	Amazing Spider-Man #193–200	Jul 2012	425	HC: 978-0785162650
97	Spider-Man	Return Of The Burglar	1979	Amazing Spider-Man #193–200	Jul 2012	425	DM 978-0785162667
98	X-Men	Beauty And The Beast	1982	Marvel Graphic Novel No. 12 - Dazzler: The Movie, Beauty And The Beast #1–4, material from Marvel Heartbreakers #1	Jul 2012	350	HC: 978-0785162735
98	X-Men	Beauty And The Beast	1982	Marvel Graphic Novel No. 12 - Dazzler: The Movie, Beauty And The Beast #1–4, material from Marvel Heartbreakers #1	Jul 2012	350	DM: 978-0785162742
99	Iron Man	Revenge Of The Mandarin	1998-1999	Iron Man (vol. 3) #8–14, Iron Man/Captain America Annual 1998, Fantastic Four (vol. 3) #15	Aug 2012	325	HC: 978-0785162605
99	Iron Man	Revenge Of The Mandarin	1998-1999	Iron Man (vol. 3) #8–14, Iron Man/Captain America Annual 1998, Fantastic Four (vol. 3) #15	Aug 2012	325	DM: 978-0785162612
100	X-Force	Child's Play	1994	X-Force #32–37, X-Force Annual #3, New Warriors #44–46	Aug 2012	594	HC: 978-0785162698
100	X-Force	Child's Play	1994	X-Force #32–37, X-Force Annual #3, New Warriors #44–46	Aug 2012	594	DM: 978 0785162704
101	X-Men	Iceman	1981, 1984-195	Iceman #1–4, material from Bizarre Adventures #27	Aug 2012	350	HC: 978-0785162759
101	X-Men	Iceman	1981, 1984-195	Iceman #1–4, material from Bizarre Adventures #27	Aug 2012	350	DM: 978-0785162766
102	The Hulk	Boiling Point	2002-2003	Incredible Hulk (vol. 2) #40–49	Sep 2012	340	HC: 978-0785162575
102	The Hulk	Boiling Point	2002-2003	Incredible Hulk (vol. 2) #40–49	Sep 2012	340	DM: 978-0785162582
103	Spider-Man	Revenge Of The Sinister Six	1991-1992	Spider-Man #15 and 18–23	Sep 2012	400	HC: 978-0785160564
103	Spider-Man	Revenge Of The Sinister Six	1991-1992	Spider-Man #15 and 18–23	Sep 2012	400	DM: 978-0785160571
104	The Avengers	The Bride Of Ultron	1977	Avengers #157–166	Oct 2012	510	HC: 978-0785162513
104	The Avengers	The Bride Of Ultron	1977	Avengers #157–166	Oct 2012	510	DM: 978-0785162520
105	Spider-Man	Nothing Can Stop The Juggernaut	1982	Amazing Spider-Man #224–230	Oct 2012	500	HC: 978-0785162636
105	Spider-Man	Nothing Can Stop The Juggernaut	1982	Amazing Spider-Man #224–230	Oct 2012	500	DM: 978-0785162636
Book 106, Hulk: Abominable, was mistakenly released with number 103 on the spine
106	The Hulk	Abominable	2003	Incredible Hulk (vol. 2) #50–59	Nov 2012	360	HC: 978-0785162551
106	The Hulk	Abominable	2003	Incredible Hulk (vol. 2) #50–59	Nov 2012	360	DM: 978-0785162568
107	X-Force	Phalanx Covenant	1994	X-Force #38–43, X-Factor #106, Excalibur #82	Aug 2013	400	HC: 978-0785162711
107	X-Force	Phalanx Covenant	1994	X-Force #38–43, X-Factor #106, Excalibur #82	Aug 2013	400	DM: 978-0785162728

== See also ==
- Marvel Epic Collection
- Marvel Omnibus
- Marvel oversized hardcovers
- Marvel Gallery Editions
- Marvel Complete Collections
- Marvel Masterworks
- Essential Marvel
- Daredevil collected editions
- Spider-Man collected editions
- DC Finest trade paperbacks
- DC Compact Comics
