= DC Comics Classics Library =

The DC Comics Classics Library was a line of hardcover comic book collections, collecting older DC Comics storylines in a standardized reprint format along a similar direction as Marvel Comics' Marvel Premiere Classic hardcover comic book collection line, which started in 2006. Nine volumes were released between 2009 and 2010 (a 10th volume was announced, but never published), after which the line was cancelled.

== Collections ==
#	Volume characters	Volume title	Creators	Material collected	Publication date	ISBN
1	Superman	Superman: Kryptonite Nevermore	Dennis O'Neil, Curt Swan	Superman #233-238 and 240-242	2009/01/28	978-1401220853
2	The Legion of Super-Heroes	The Legion of Super-Heroes: The Life and Death of Ferro Lad	Jim Shooter, Curt Swan, et al.	Adventure Comics #346-347, 352-353 and 357	2009/02/18	978-1401221935
3	Batman	The Batman Annuals Volume 1	Bill Finger, Edmond Hamilton, Dick Sprang, et al.	Batman Annual #1-3	2009/04/22	978-1401221928
4	The Swamp Thing	Roots of the Swamp Thing	Len Wein, Bernie Wrightson, Nestor Redondo	The House of Secrets #92 and Swamp Thing #1-13	2009/05/27	978-1401222369
5	The Flash	The Flash of Two Worlds	Gardner Fox, Carmine Infantino, John Broome	The Flash (vol. 2) #123, 129, 137, 151, 170 and 173	2009/07/29	978-1401222987
6	The Justice League of America	Justice League of America by George Pérez Volume 1	Gerry Conway, George Pérez	Justice League of America #184-186 and 192-194	2009/08/26	978-1401223212
7	Batman	Batman: A Death in the Family	Jim Starlin, Marv Wolfman, George Pérez, et al.	Batman #426-429 and 440-442 and The New Teen Titans (vol. 2) #60-61	2009/09/23	978-1401225162
8	The Justice League of America	Justice League of America by George Pérez Volume 2	Gerry Conway, George Pérez, et al.	Justice League of America #195-197 and 200	2010/04/13	978-1401224509
9	Batman	The Batman Annuals Volume 2	Bill Finger	Batman Annual #4-7	2010/08/10	978-1401227913
10	Shazam!	Shazam! The Monster Society of Evil	Otto Binder, C. C. Beck	Captain Marvel stories from Captain Marvel Adventures #22-46	publication cancelled	n/a

== Reprints ==
In 2011, trade paperbacks were released for both the Roots of the Swamp Thing volume (with the same cover design as the hardcover version) and the Batman: A Death in the Family volume (with a new cover design that was different from the hardcover version) with both of them no longer bearing the DC Comics Classics Library name.

== See also ==
- Marvel Premiere Classic
- List of comic books on CD/DVD
