= Daredevil collected editions =

List of Daredevil comics collated into collected editions

A selection of Daredevil collected editions

The Marvel Comics character Daredevil (the mantle assumed by Matt Murdock and Elektra Natchios) first appeared in 1964 in Daredevil #1, written by Stan Lee and drawn by Bill Everett.

The character's various appearances have been collated into hundreds of trade paperback, hardcover and omnibus collections.

== Collected editions by era ==
Marvel's first attempt at chronologically collecting the core title was in 1991, with the Marvel Masterworks premium hardcover line. The series reprinted 10-12 comics per book.

The next try was the Essential Marvel line, which reproduced comics in black and white. These books were released from 1996 to 2013, before being replaced by the full-color Epic Collections.

Other than those, many other issues have been republished in collected form.

=== Volume 1 (1964-1998) ===
The first volume of Daredevil is defined by the 30 issues worked on by Frank Miller. "It's not an exaggeration to say that Miller created a whole new mythos for Daredevil," writes Comic Book Resources. "Miller's run resulted in an unofficial edict for Daredevil writers that "Matt Murdock must suffer.""

After Miller, Ann Nocenti became the first woman to write the character, inventing the villain, Typhoid Mary, and redefining the role of Murdock's love interest, Karen Page. Described as "Daredevil's Most Underrated Writer", Nocenti "reimagined Karen Page as a three-dimensional character who was just as heroic, if not more, than Daredevil himself". This was in contrast to Miller's depiction that made "Karen undesirable and a damsel in distress, incapable of helping herself or anyone else around her."

As well as the below, the full run of Volume One was reproduced through Marvel's Epic Collection.

#	Title	Material collected	Format	Pages	Released	ISBN
Trade Paperbacks
	Daredevil vs. Bullseye	Daredevil #131–132, 146, 169, 181, 191	TPB	144	Oct 2004	978-0785115625
1	Daredevil Visionaries: Frank Miller Vol. 1	Daredevil #158–161, 163–167	TPB	176	18 Dec 2000	978-0785107576
2	Daredevil Visionaries: Frank Miller Vol. 2	Daredevil #168–182	TPB	368	May 2001	978-0785107712
3	Daredevil Visionaries: Frank Miller Vol. 3	Daredevil #183–191; Bizarre Adventures #28; What If? #28, 35	TPB	272	Nov 2001	978-0785108023
	Daredevil: Marked For Death	Daredevil #159–161, 163–164	TPB	96	Mar 1990	978-0871356345
	Daredevil: Gang War	Daredevil #169–172, 180	TPB	114	Dec 1992	978-0871358806
	Daredevil/Punisher: Child's Play	Daredevil #182–184	TPB	unknown	Feb 1988	978-0871353511
	Daredevil: Love's Labor Lost	Daredevil #215–217, 219–222, 225–226	TPB	208	7 Oct 2002	978-0785110293
	Daredevil: Born Again	Daredevil #226–233	TPB	248	Jan 2010	978-0785134817
2	Daredevil Legends: Born Again	Daredevil #227–233	TPB	176	26 Nov 2001	978-0871352972
4	Daredevil Legends: Typhoid Mary	Daredevil #254–257, 259–263	TPB	224	Jun 2003	978-0785110415
	Daredevil: Lone Stranger	Daredevil #265–273	TPB	216	10 Mar 2010	978-0785144526
	Daredevil: The Fall Of The Kingpin	Daredevil #297–300	TPB	96	Mar 1993	978-0871359650
	Daredevil: Fall From Grace	Daredevil #319–325 (with added pages)	TPB	206	Sep 1994	978-0785100249
Marvel Premiere Classic Hardcover
19	Born Again	Daredevil #226-233	HC	248	Jan 2009	Bookstore cover: 978-0785134800
19	Born Again	Daredevil #226-233	HC	248	Jan 2009	Direct Market cover: 978-0785136552
Gallery Hardcover
	Born Again	Daredevil #226-233	Gallery HC	248	21 Aug 2023	978-1302953041
Premier Collection
	Born Again	Daredevil #226-233	Digest	280	4 Feb 2025	978-1302965983
Omnibuses
1	Daredevil Omnibus Vol. 1	Daredevil #1–41, Annual (1967); Fantastic Four #73; Not Brand Echh #4	Omnibus	1,088	14 Feb 2017	Alex Ross cover: 978-1302904272
1	Daredevil Omnibus Vol. 1	Daredevil #1–41, Annual (1967); Fantastic Four #73; Not Brand Echh #4	Omnibus	1,088	14 Feb 2017	Jack Kirby DM cover: 978-1302905187
2	Daredevil Omnibus Vol. 2	Daredevil #42–74, Iron Man #35, material from #36	Omnibus	800	30 May 2023	Gene Colan cover: 978-1302948696
2	Daredevil Omnibus Vol. 2	Daredevil #42–74, Iron Man #35, material from #36	Omnibus	800	30 May 2023	Gene Colan Unmasked DM cover: 978-1302948702
3	Daredevil Omnibus Vol. 3	Daredevil #75–119, Avengers #111, Marvel Two In One #3, material from Amazing Adventures #1-8	Omnibus	1,160	9 April 2024	Rich Buckler cover: 978-1302955182
3	Daredevil Omnibus Vol. 3	Daredevil #75–119, Avengers #111, Marvel Two In One #3, material from Amazing Adventures #1-8	Omnibus	1,160	9 April 2024	John Romita Sr. DM cover: 978-1302955199
4	Daredevil Omnibus Vol. 4	Daredevil ##120-158, Annual #4; Ghost Rider #20; Marvel Premiere (1972) #39-40, #43; material from What If...? #8	Omnibus	976	22 Sep 2026	Gil Kane cover: 978-1302968489
4	Daredevil Omnibus Vol. 4	Daredevil ##120-158, Annual #4; Ghost Rider #20; Marvel Premiere (1972) #39-40, #43; material from What If...? #8	Omnibus	976	22 Sep 2026	Gene Colan DM cover: 978-1302968496
	Women Of Marvel Omnibus	Daredevil #108–112, and other material	Omnibus	1,160	19 Jan 2011	Olivier Coipel cover: 978-0785143260
	Women Of Marvel Omnibus	Daredevil #108–112, and other material	Omnibus	1,160	19 Jan 2011	Ramona Fradon DM cover: 978-0785149996
	Daredevil by Frank Miller and Klaus Janson	Daredevil #158–161, 163–191; What If? #28	Omnibus	840	7 Mar 2007	Frank Miller red & black cover: 978-0785126690
	Daredevil by Frank Miller and Klaus Janson	Daredevil #158–161, 163–191; What If? #28	Omnibus	840	7 Mar 2007	Daredevil #181 cover: 978-0785123439
	Daredevil by Frank Miller and Klaus Janson	Daredevil #158–161, 163–191; What If? #28	Omnibus	840	6 Nov 2013	Frank Miller red & black cover: 978-0785185680
	Daredevil by Frank Miller and Klaus Janson	Daredevil #158–161, 163–191; What If? #28	Omnibus	840	2 Mar 2016	Frank Miller red & black cover: 978-0785195368
	Daredevil by Frank Miller and Klaus Janson	Daredevil #158–161, 163–191; What If? #28	Omnibus	840	31 Jan 2023	Frank Miller poster cover: 978-1302945534
	Daredevil by Frank Miller and Klaus Janson	Daredevil #158–161, 163–191; What If? #28	Omnibus	840	31 Jan 2023	Daredevil #181 cover: 978-1302945541
	Daredevil by Frank Miller Companion	Daredevil #219, 226–233; Daredevil: The Man Without Fear #1–5; Daredevil: Love And War, Peter Parker, the Spectacular Spider–Man #27–28	Omnibus	608	28 Dec 2007	David Mazzucchelli Apocalypse cover: 978-0785123507
	Daredevil by Frank Miller Companion	Daredevil #219, 226–233; Daredevil: The Man Without Fear #1–5; Daredevil: Love And War, Peter Parker, the Spectacular Spider–Man #27–28	Omnibus	608	28 Dec 2007	Frank Miller red & black DM cover: 978-0785126768
	Daredevil by Frank Miller Companion	Daredevil #219, 226–233; Daredevil: The Man Without Fear #1–5; Daredevil: Love And War, Peter Parker, the Spectacular Spider–Man #27–28	Omnibus	608	6 Apr 2016	Frank Miller red & black cover: 978-0785195382
	Daredevil by Frank Miller Companion	Daredevil #219, 226–233; Daredevil: The Man Without Fear #1–5; Daredevil: Love And War, Peter Parker, the Spectacular Spider–Man #27–28	Omnibus	608	14 May 2024	Frank Miller red & black cover: 978-1302957650
	Daredevil by Frank Miller Companion	Daredevil #219, 226–233; Daredevil: The Man Without Fear #1–5; Daredevil: Love And War, Peter Parker, the Spectacular Spider–Man #27–28	Omnibus	608	14 May 2024	David Mazzucchelli Apocalypse DM cover: 978-1302957667
1	Daredevil by Nocenti & Romita Jr Vol.1	Daredevil #234-266, Punisher (1987) #10	Omnibus	856	25 Feb 2025	John Romita Jr cover: 978-1302963729
1	Daredevil by Nocenti & Romita Jr Vol.1	Daredevil #234-266, Punisher (1987) #10	Omnibus	856	25 Feb 2025	Keith Pollard DM cover: 978-1302963736
2	Daredevil by Nocenti & Romita Jr. Vol. 2	Daredevil #267-291, Annual #5-6; Spectacular Spider-Man #213-214; material from Marvel Comics Presents #109-116, 123-130, 150-151; Marvel Holiday Special #2	Omnibus	992	28 Jul 2026	John Romita Jr cover: 978-1302968830
2	Daredevil by Nocenti & Romita Jr. Vol. 2	Daredevil #267-291, Annual #5-6; Spectacular Spider-Man #213-214; material from Marvel Comics Presents #109-116, 123-130, 150-151; Marvel Holiday Special #2	Omnibus	992	28 Jul 2026	Mark Bagley DM cover: 978-1302968847

=== Volume 2 (1998-2009, Marvel Knights Era) ===
In 1998, Daredevil was cancelled and relaunched, with a new #1. Filmmaker Kevin Smith served as writer and Joe Quesada as artist. This relaunch "set the tone for the entire Marvel Knights line, directly inspired subsequent depictions of the character in film and television and set the template for how to relaunch a Marvel character."

The rest of the volume was dominated by Brian Michael Bendis' 55 issues, then 33 from Ed Brubaker. Bendis said: "I plan for the biggest, most elaborate feast I can do and dive in and hope for the best. Also it's Daredevil. I've been thinking about it like since I could read and Daredevil's one of those books that a lot of my heroes didn't just work on, but they did their masterpiece on."

As well as the below, the full run of Volume Two was reproduced through Marvel's Modern Era Epic Collection.

#	Title	Material collected	Legacy	Format	Pages	Released	ISBN
Trade Paperbacks
1	Guardian Devil	Daredevil (vol. 2) #1–8	#381-388	HC	232	24 Sep 2008	978-0785134381
1	Guardian Devil	Daredevil (vol. 2) #1–8	#381-388	TPB	192	Sep 1999	978-0785107378
1	Guardian Devil	Daredevil (vol. 2) #1–8	#381-388	TPB	192	3 Sep 2024	978-1804911686
2	Parts Of A Hole	Daredevil (vol. 2) #9–15	#389-395	HC	176	7 Apr 2010	978-0785142874
2	Parts Of A Hole	Daredevil (vol. 2) #9–15	#389-395	TPB	176	4 Mar 2002	978-0785108085
3	Wake Up	Daredevil (vol. 2) #16–19	#396-399	TPB	96	Jul 2002	978-0785109488
Issues #20-25 were not reprinted during the initial run
4	Underboss	Daredevil (vol. 2) #26–31	#406-411	TPB	144	16 Sep 2002	978-0785110248
5	Out	Daredevil (vol. 2) #32–40	#412-420	TPB	208	Feb 2003	978-0785110743
6	Lowlife	Daredevil (vol. 2) #41–45	#421-425	TPB	120	Jul 2003	978-0785111054
7	Hardcore	Daredevil (vol. 2) #46–50	#426-430	TPB	120	Nov 2003	978-0785111689
8	Echo – Vision Quest	Daredevil (vol. 2) #51–55	#431-435	TPB	120	Mar 2004	978-0785112327
9	The King Of Hell's Kitchen	Daredevil (vol. 2) #56–60	#436-440	TPB	120	Aug 2004	978-0785113379
10	The Widow	Daredevil (vol. 2) #61–65; Daredevil (vol. 1) #81	#441-445	TPB	160	Dec 2004	978-0785113942
11	Golden Age	Daredevil (vol. 2) #66–70	#446-450	TPB	120	May 2005	978-0785113959
12	Decalogue	Daredevil (vol. 2) #71–75	#451-455	TPB	136	Nov 2005	978-0785116448
13	The Murdock Papers	Daredevil (vol. 2) #76–81	#456-461	TPB	152	29 Mar 2006	978-0785118107
Ed Brubaker takes over as main writer
1	The Devil Inside And Out Vol. 1	Daredevil (vol. 2) #82–87	#462-467	TPB	144	8 Nov 2006	978-0785119883
2	The Devil Inside And Out Vol. 2	Daredevil (vol. 2) #88–93	#468-473	TPB	144	2 May 2007	978-0785122418
3	Daredevil: Hell To Pay Vol. 1	Daredevil (vol. 2) #94–99	#474-479	TPB	144	10 Oct 2007	978-0785124849
4	Daredevil: Hell To Pay Vol. 2	Daredevil (vol. 2) #100–105	#480-485	TPB	160	7 May 2008	978-0785128151
5	Daredevil: Cruel And Unusual	Daredevil (vol. 2) #106–110	#486-490	TPB	120	22 Oct 2008	978-0785128892
6	Daredevil: Lady Bullseye	Daredevil (vol. 2) #111–115	#491-495	TPB	120	8 Apr 2009	978-0785131816
7	Return Of The King	Daredevil (vol. 2) #116–119; Daredevil #500	#496-500	TPB	144	28 Oct 2009	978-0785133407
Andy Diggle takes over as main writer
1	The Devil's Hand	Daredevil #501–507; Daredevil: Dark Reign – The List	#501-507	TPB	192	25 Aug 2010	978-0785141136
2	Shadowland	Daredevil #508–512; Shadowland: After The Fall	#508-512	TPB	96	24 Aug 2011	978-0785149903
Marvel Knights Collections
1	Marvel Knights Daredevil by Smith & Quesada: Guardian Devil	Daredevil (vol. 2) #1–8, #½	#381-388	TPB	232	11 Sep 2018	978-1302913885
2	Marvel Knights Daredevil by Mack & Quesada: Parts Of A Hole	Daredevil (vol. 2) #9–15	#389-395	TPB	176	31 Dec 2018	978-1302914738
3	Marvel Knights Daredevil by Bendis, Jenkins, Gale, & Mack: Unusual Suspects	Daredevil (vol. 2) #20–25, 51–55, Daredevil: Ninja #1–3, Daredevil/Spider–Man #1–4, Spider–Man/Daredevil #1	#400-405, #431-435	TPB	472	3 Jan 2019	978-1302914721
4	Marvel Knights Daredevil by Bendis & Maleev: Underboss	Daredevil (vol. 2) #26–31	#406-411	TPB	152	17 Oct 2018	978-1302914035
Ultimate Collections
1	Daredevil by Brian Michael Bendis & Alex Maleev Ultimate Collection Book 1	Daredevil (vol. 2) #16–19, 26–40	#396-399, #406-420	TPB	488	30 Jun 2010	978-0785143888
2	Daredevil by Brian Michael Bendis & Alex Maleev Ultimate Collection Book 2	Daredevil (vol. 2) #41–50, 56–65	#421-430, #436-445	TPB	512	14 Sep 2010	978-0785149507
3	Daredevil by Brian Michael Bendis & Alex Maleev Ultimate Collection Book 3	Daredevil (vol. 2) #66–81, What If... Karen Page Had Lived?, Ultimate Marvel Team–Up #6–8	#446-461	TPB	512	8 Dec 2010	978-0785149514
1	Daredevil By Ed Brubaker & Michael Lark Ultimate Collection Book 1	Daredevil (vol. 2) #82–93	#462-473	TPB	304	24 Jan 2012	978-0785163343
2	Daredevil By Ed Brubaker & Michael Lark Ultimate Collection Book 2	Daredevil (vol. 2) #94–105	#474-485	TPB	304	13 Jun 2012	978-0785163350
3	Daredevil By Ed Brubaker & Michael Lark Ultimate Collection Book 3	Daredevil (vol. 2) #106–119, 500	#486-500	TPB	384	10 Oct 2012	978-0785163367
Gallery Hardcover
	Guardian Devil	Daredevil (vol. 2) #1-8, #½	#381-388	Gallery HC	296	5 Sep 2023	978-1302950170
Oversized Hardcovers
1	Daredevil Vol. 1	Daredevil (vol. 2) #1–15, #½	#381-395	OHC	336	8 Apr 2003	978-0785110156
1	Daredevil Vol. 1	Daredevil (vol. 2) #1–15, #½	#381-395	OHC	336	13 Sep 2006	978-0785124016
2	Daredevil Vol. 2	Daredevil (vol. 2) #26-37	#406-417	OHC	288	1 Dec 2002	978-0785109266
3	Daredevil Vol. 3	Daredevil (vol. 2) #38-50	#418-430	OHC	320	1 Mar 2004	978-0785111061
4	Daredevil Vol. 4	Daredevil (vol. 2) #56-65	#436-445	OHC	280	31 Aug 2005	978-0785113423
5	Daredevil Vol. 5	Daredevil (vol. 2) #66-75	#446-455	OHC	256	28 Jun 2006	978-0785121107
6	Daredevil Vol. 6	Daredevil (vol. 2) #16-19, #76-81	#396-399, #456-461	OHC	304	11 Oct 2006	978-0785121114
Omnibuses
	Marvel Knights by Joe Quesada	Daredevil (vol. 2) #1–15, #½, Daredevil: Father #1–6, Marvel Authentix: Daredevil #1, material from Marvel Knights Double–Shot #1	#381-395	Omnibus	720	6 Nov 2018	978-1302914066
1	Daredevil by Brian Michael Bendis & Alex Maleev, Vol. 1	Daredevil (vol. 2) #16–19, 26–50, 56–60	#396-440	Omnibus	848	27 Aug 2008	978-0785131120
1	Daredevil by Brian Michael Bendis & Alex Maleev, Vol. 1	Daredevil (vol. 2) #16–19, 26–50, 56–60	#396-440	Omnibus	848	8 Jan 2020	978-1302921668
1	Daredevil by Brian Michael Bendis & Alex Maleev, Vol. 1	Daredevil (vol. 2) #16–19, 26–50, 56–60	#396-440	Omnibus	848	6 Aug 2024	Alex Maleev cover: 978-1302957636
1	Daredevil by Brian Michael Bendis & Alex Maleev, Vol. 1	Daredevil (vol. 2) #16–19, 26–50, 56–60	#396-440	Omnibus	848	6 Aug 2024	David Mack DM cover: 978-1302957643
2	Daredevil by Brian Michael Bendis & Alex Maleev, Vol. 2	Daredevil (vol. 2) #61–81; What If... Karen Page Had Lived?; Ultimate Marvel Team–Up #6–8	#441-461	Omnibus	656	23 Dec 2009	978-0785138136
2	Daredevil by Brian Michael Bendis & Alex Maleev, Vol. 2	Daredevil (vol. 2) #61–81; What If... Karen Page Had Lived?; Ultimate Marvel Team–Up #6–8	#441-461	Omnibus	656	12 Feb 2020	978-1302921675
2	Daredevil by Brian Michael Bendis & Alex Maleev, Vol. 2	Daredevil (vol. 2) #61–81; What If... Karen Page Had Lived?; Ultimate Marvel Team–Up #6–8	#441-461	Omnibus	656	21 Jan 2025	Alex Maleev cover: 978-1302959166
2	Daredevil by Brian Michael Bendis & Alex Maleev, Vol. 2	Daredevil (vol. 2) #61–81; What If... Karen Page Had Lived?; Ultimate Marvel Team–Up #6–8	#441-461	Omnibus	656	21 Jan 2025	Joe Quesada DM cover: 978-1302959173
1	Daredevil by Ed Brubaker & Michael Lark Vol. 1	Daredevil (vol. 2) #82–105	#462-485	Omnibus	608	3 Jun 2009	978-0785137856
1	Daredevil by Ed Brubaker & Michael Lark Vol. 1	Daredevil (vol. 2) #82–105	#462-485	Omnibus	608	5 Apr 2017	978-1302905088
1	Daredevil by Ed Brubaker & Michael Lark Vol. 1	Daredevil (vol. 2) #82–105	#462-485	Omnibus	608	7 Jun 2022	Marko Djurdjevic cover: 978-1302945510
1	Daredevil by Ed Brubaker & Michael Lark Vol. 1	Daredevil (vol. 2) #82–105	#462-485	Omnibus	608	7 Jun 2022	David Finch DM cover: 978-1302945527
2	Daredevil by Ed Brubaker & Michael Lark Vol. 2	Daredevil (vol. 2) #106–119, Annual #1; Daredevil #500; Blood of the Tarantula	#486-500	Omnibus	472	3 Jun 2010	978-0785145202
2	Daredevil by Ed Brubaker & Michael Lark Vol. 2	Daredevil (vol. 2) #106–119, Annual #1; Daredevil #500; Blood of the Tarantula	#486-500	Omnibus	472	3 May 2017	978-1302908591
2	Daredevil by Ed Brubaker & Michael Lark Vol. 2	Daredevil (vol. 2) #106–119, Annual #1; Daredevil #500; Blood of the Tarantula	#486-500	Omnibus	472	24 Mar 2024	Marko Djurdjevic cover: 978-1302957575
2	Daredevil by Ed Brubaker & Michael Lark Vol. 2	Daredevil (vol. 2) #106–119, Annual #1; Daredevil #500; Blood of the Tarantula	#486-500	Omnibus	472	24 Mar 2024	Joe Quesada DM cover: 978-1302957582
	Daredevil: Shadowland Omnibus	Daredevil (vol. 2) #501–512; Dark Reign: The List – Daredevil #1, Shadowland #1–5; Shadowland: Elektra, Bullseye, Ghost Rider, Spider–Man, After the Fall; Shadowland: Moon Knight #1–3; Shadowland: Blood on the Streets #1–4; Shadowland: Daughters of the Shadow #1–3; Shadowland: Power Man #1–4; Thunderbolts (1997) #148–149; Daredevil: Reborn #1–4	#501-512	Omnibus	1,112	7 Feb 2018	John Cassaday cover: 978-1302910372
	Daredevil: Shadowland Omnibus	Daredevil (vol. 2) #501–512; Dark Reign: The List – Daredevil #1, Shadowland #1–5; Shadowland: Elektra, Bullseye, Ghost Rider, Spider–Man, After the Fall; Shadowland: Moon Knight #1–3; Shadowland: Blood on the Streets #1–4; Shadowland: Daughters of the Shadow #1–3; Shadowland: Power Man #1–4; Thunderbolts (1997) #148–149; Daredevil: Reborn #1–4	#501-512	Omnibus	1,112	7 Feb 2018	Billy Tan DM cover: 978-1302911140
	Daredevil: Shadowland Omnibus	Daredevil (vol. 2) #501–512; Dark Reign: The List – Daredevil #1, Shadowland #1–5; Shadowland: Elektra, Bullseye, Ghost Rider, Spider–Man, After the Fall; Shadowland: Moon Knight #1–3; Shadowland: Blood on the Streets #1–4; Shadowland: Daughters of the Shadow #1–3; Shadowland: Power Man #1–4; Thunderbolts (1997) #148–149; Daredevil: Reborn #1–4	#501-512	Omnibus	1,112	24 Jul 2024	John Cassaday cover: 978-1302957780
	Daredevil: Shadowland Omnibus	Daredevil (vol. 2) #501–512; Dark Reign: The List – Daredevil #1, Shadowland #1–5; Shadowland: Elektra, Bullseye, Ghost Rider, Spider–Man, After the Fall; Shadowland: Moon Knight #1–3; Shadowland: Blood on the Streets #1–4; Shadowland: Daughters of the Shadow #1–3; Shadowland: Power Man #1–4; Thunderbolts (1997) #148–149; Daredevil: Reborn #1–4	#501-512	Omnibus	1,112	24 Jul 2024	Billy Tan DM cover: 978-1302957797

=== Volumes 3 & 4 (2011-2014, Mark Waid Era) ===
Mark Waid became the writer of Daredevil in 2011. The third and fourth volumes largely tell a continuing story, despite the #1.

On the transition, Waid said: "We were willing to take chances as storytellers and that (Marvel) would back us. We were making such a huge paradigm shift for the character and his world and his entire method of operation. We'd actually been given the chance to renumber last year, around the time of issue 22-23, but we said "no" then because it truly would have been an artificial break. This time, it makes sense.

#	Title	Material collected	Legacy	Format	Pages	Released	ISBN
Volume 3
Trade Paperbacks
1	Daredevil by Mark Waid Vol. 1	Daredevil (vol. 3) #1–6	#513-518	HC	152	8 Feb 2012	978-0785152378
1	Daredevil by Mark Waid Vol. 1	Daredevil (vol. 3) #1–6	#513-518	TPB	152	8 Aug 2012	978-0785152385
2	Daredevil by Mark Waid Vol. 2	Daredevil (vol. 3) #7–10, 10. 1, Amazing Spider–Man #677	#519-522	HC	136	27 Jun 2012	978-0785152408
2	Daredevil by Mark Waid Vol. 2	Daredevil (vol. 3) #7–10, 10. 1, Amazing Spider–Man #677	#519-522	TPB	136	26 Dec 2012	978-0785152392
3	Daredevil by Mark Waid Vol. 3	Daredevil (vol. 3) #11–15, Avenging Spider–Man #6, Punisher #10	#523-527	HC	160	3 Oct 2012	978-0785161004
3	Daredevil by Mark Waid Vol. 3	Daredevil (vol. 3) #11–15, Avenging Spider–Man #6, Punisher #10	#523-527	TPB	160	2 Apr 2013	978-0785161011
4	Daredevil by Mark Waid Vol. 4	Daredevil (vol. 3) #16–21	#528-533	HC	136	12 Mar 2013	978-0785161028
4	Daredevil by Mark Waid Vol. 4	Daredevil (vol. 3) #16–21	#528-533	TPB	136	10 Sep 2013	978-0785161035
5	Daredevil by Mark Waid Vol. 5	Daredevil (vol. 3) #22–27	#534-539	HC	144	20 Aug 2013	978-0785161042
5	Daredevil by Mark Waid Vol. 5	Daredevil (vol. 3) #22–27	#534-539	TPB	144	22 Apr 2014	978-0785161059
6	Daredevil by Mark Waid Vol. 6	Daredevil (vol. 3) #28–30, Indestructible Hulk #9–10	#540-542	HC	112	24 Dec 2013	978-0785184805
6	Daredevil by Mark Waid Vol. 6	Daredevil (vol. 3) #28–30, Indestructible Hulk #9–10	#540-542	TPB	112	2 Sep 2014	978-0785166795
7	Daredevil by Mark Waid Vol. 7	Daredevil (vol. 3) #31–36	#543-548	HC	136	29 Apr 2014	978-0785154426
7	Daredevil by Mark Waid Vol. 7	Daredevil (vol. 3) #31–36	#543-548	TPB	136	6 Jan 2015	978-0785189619
Oversized Hardcovers
1	Daredevil by Mark Waid, Vol. 1	Daredevil (vol. 3) #1–10, 10.1, Amazing Spider–Man #677	#513-522	OHC	288	26 Feb 2013	978-0785168065
2	Daredevil by Mark Waid, Vol. 2	Daredevil (vol. 3) #11–21, Avenging Spider–Man #6, Punisher #10	#523-533	OHC	296	25 Feb 2014	978-0785184799
3	Daredevil by Mark Waid, Vol. 3	Daredevil (vol. 3) #22–36, Indestructible Hulk #9–10	#534-548	OHC	368	15 Jul 2014	978-0785190233
Volume 4
Trade Paperbacks
1	Daredevil Vol. 1: Devil At Bay	Daredevil (vol. 4) #1–5, 0.5	#549-553	TPB	128	28 Oct 2014	978-0785154112
2	Daredevil Vol. 2: West–Case Scenario	Daredevil (vol. 4) #6–10, 1.50	#554-558	TPB	152	3 Mar 2015	978-0785154129
3	Daredevil Vol. 3: The Daredevil You Know	Daredevil (vol. 4) #11–15	#559-563	TPB	112	4 Aug 2015	978-0785192282
4	Daredevil Vol. 4: The Autobiography of Matt Murdock	Daredevil (vol. 4) #15.1, 16–18	#564-566	TPB	104	8 Dec 2015	978-0785198024
Oversized Hardcovers
4	Daredevil by Mark Waid & Chris Samnee Vol. 4	Daredevil (vol. 4) #1–10, 0.1, 1.50	#549-558	OHC	312	16 Feb 2016	978-0785195344
5	Daredevil by Mark Waid & Chris Samnee Vol. 5	Daredevil (vol. 4) #11–18, 15.1	#559-566	OHC	216	17 May 2016	978-1302900601
Omnibuses
1	Daredevil by Mark Waid Omnibus Vol. 1	Daredevil (vol. 3) #1–27, 10.1; Amazing Spider–Man #677; Avenging Spider–Man #6; The Punisher (2011) #10	#513-539	Omnibus	728	1 Mar 2017	978-1302904265
1	Daredevil by Mark Waid Omnibus Vol. 1	Daredevil (vol. 3) #1–27, 10.1; Amazing Spider–Man #677; Avenging Spider–Man #6; The Punisher (2011) #10	#513-539	Omnibus	728	7 Nov 2023	Paolo Rivera cover: 978-1302952778
1	Daredevil by Mark Waid Omnibus Vol. 1	Daredevil (vol. 3) #1–27, 10.1; Amazing Spider–Man #677; Avenging Spider–Man #6; The Punisher (2011) #10	#513-539	Omnibus	728	7 Nov 2023	Neal Adams DM cover: 978-1302952785
2	Daredevil by Mark Waid & Chris Samnee Omnibus Vol. 2	Daredevil (vol. 3) #28–36; Indestructible Hulk #9–10; Daredevil (vol. 4) #1–18, #1.50, #0.1, #15.1	#540-566	Omnibus	768	7 Mar 2018	978-1302908980
2	Daredevil by Mark Waid & Chris Samnee Omnibus Vol. 2	Daredevil (vol. 3) #28–36; Indestructible Hulk #9–10; Daredevil (vol. 4) #1–18, #1.50, #0.1, #15.1	#540-566	Omnibus	768	3 Jan 2024	Chris Samnee cover: 978-1302952808
2	Daredevil by Mark Waid & Chris Samnee Omnibus Vol. 2	Daredevil (vol. 3) #28–36; Indestructible Hulk #9–10; Daredevil (vol. 4) #1–18, #1.50, #0.1, #15.1	#540-566	Omnibus	768	3 Jan 2024	Frank Cho DM cover: 978-1302952815

=== Volume 5 (2015-2018, Charles Soule Era) ===
After Mark Waid's run on the title, Charles Soule took Daredevil past issue #600. His arc saw both Daredevil and his arch-nemesis, Kingpin, become Mayor of New York. On this, Soule said: "I love the 'city under siege' sub-genre, where people trapped in some untenable situation have to find a way to survive and escape. It's a little tricky to pull something like that off in Marvel's New York City, but I like how it came together here."

#	Title	Material collected	Legacy	Format	Pages	Released	ISBN
Trade Paperbacks: Back In Black Era
1	Chinatown	Daredevil (vol. 5) #1–5, All–New All–Different Marvel Point One #1 ("Blindspot")	#567-571	TPB	120	21 May 2016	978-0785196440
2	Supersonic	Daredevil (vol. 5) #6–9, Annual (2016)	#572-575	TPB	120	27 Sep 2016	978-0785196457
3	Dark Art	Daredevil (vol. 5) #10–14	#576-580	TPB	112	9 Mar 2017	978-1302902971
4	Identity	Daredevil (vol. 5) #15–20	#581-586	TPB	136	1 Aug 2017	978-1302905620
5	Supreme	Daredevil (vol. 5) #21–28	#587-594	TPB	112	31 Oct 2017	978-1302905637
6	Mayor Fisk	Daredevil (vol. 5) #595–600	#595-600	TPB	136	7 Aug 2018	978-1302910624
6	Mayor Fisk	Daredevil (vol. 5) #595–600	#595-600	TPB	136	4 Feb 2025	978-1302964788
7	Mayor Murdock	Daredevil (vol. 5) #601–605	#601–605	TPB	112	31 Dec 2018	978-1302910631
8	Death Of Daredevil	Daredevil (vol. 5) #606–612, Annual (2018)	#606–612	TPB	168	5 Feb 2019	978-1302914523
Reprints
1	Back In Black	Daredevil (vol. 5) #1–9; All–New All–Different Marvel Point One #1 ("Blindspot"); Annual 2016; Daredevil/Punisher (2016) #1-4	#567–575	TPB	368	10 Feb 2026	978-1302968342
2	The Dark Art	Daredevil (vol. 5) #10–28	#576–594	TPB	424	10 Feb 2026	978-1302968359
3	The Death Of Daredevil	Daredevil #595–612	#595–612	TPB	440	10 Feb 2026	978-1302968366
Omnibus
	Daredevil by Charles Soule Omnibus	Daredevil (vol. 5) #1–28 and #595–612; Daredevil Annual (2016); Daredevil/Punisher: Seventh Circle #1–4 and material from All–New, All–Different Point One #1	#567–612	Omnibus	1,126	4 Jan 2022	Phil Noto cover: 978-1302929657
	Daredevil by Charles Soule Omnibus	Daredevil (vol. 5) #1–28 and #595–612; Daredevil Annual (2016); Daredevil/Punisher: Seventh Circle #1–4 and material from All–New, All–Different Point One #1	#567–612	Omnibus	1,126	4 Jan 2022	David Lopez DM cover: 978-1302929664
	Daredevil by Charles Soule Omnibus	Daredevil (vol. 5) #1–28 and #595–612; Daredevil Annual (2016); Daredevil/Punisher: Seventh Circle #1–4 and material from All–New, All–Different Point One #1	#567–612	Omnibus	1,126	2 Mar 2027	Phil Noto cover: 978-1302971939
	Daredevil by Charles Soule Omnibus	Daredevil (vol. 5) #1–28 and #595–612; Daredevil Annual (2016); Daredevil/Punisher: Seventh Circle #1–4 and material from All–New, All–Different Point One #1	#567–612	Omnibus	1,126	2 Mar 2027	David Lopez DM cover: 978-1302971922

=== Volume 6 & 7 (2019-2023, Chip Zdarsky Era) ===
Canadian writer Chip Zdarsky replaced Soule in 2019. On his approach to the book, he said: "Things can't be business as usual no matter how badly Matt wants them to be. This series is going to be about big questions and finding answers in strange places. (Matt) is trying to prove himself. That he can do the job."

#	Title	Material collected	Legacy	Format	Pages	Released	ISBN
Volume 6
Trade Paperbacks
1	Know Fear	Daredevil (vol. 6) #1–5	#613-617	TPB	136	30 Jul 2019	978-1302914981
2	No Devils, Only God	Daredevil (vol. 6) #6–10	#618-622	TPB	136	3 Dec 2019	978-1302914998
3	Through Hell	Daredevil (vol. 6) #11–15	#623-627	TPB	112	16 Jun 2020	978-1302920180
4	End Of Hell	Daredevil (vol. 6) #16–20	#628-632	TPB	112	29 Sep 2020	978-1302925802
5	Truth/Dare	Daredevil (vol. 6) #21–25, Daredevil Annual (2020)	#633-637	TPB	144	16 Feb 2021	978-1302925819
6	Doing Time	Daredevil (vol. 6) #26–30	#638-642	TPB	112	21 Sep 2021	978-1302926090
7	Lockdown	Daredevil (vol. 6) #31–36	#643-648	TPB	144	11 Jan 2022	978-1302926106
Oversized Hardcovers
1	Daredevil by Chip Zdarsky Vol. 1: To Heaven Through Hell	Daredevil (vol. 6) #1–10	#613-622	OHC	232	17 Mar 2021	978-1302928247
2	Daredevil by Chip Zdarsky Vol. 2: To Heaven Through Hell	Daredevil (vol. 6) #11–20	#623-632	OHC	224	23 Mar 2022	978-1302931995
3	Daredevil by Chip Zdarsky Vol. 3: To Heaven Through Hell	Daredevil (vol. 6) #21–30, Daredevil Annual (2020)	#633-642	OHC	264	2 Nov 2022	978-1302945114
4	Daredevil by Chip Zdarsky Vol. 4: To Heaven Through Hell	Daredevil (vol. 6) #31–36, Daredevil: Woman Without Fear #1–3	#643-648	OHC	264	19 Jul 2023	978-1302950057
Volume 7
Trade Paperbacks
1	Daredevil & Elektra by Chip Zdarsky Vol. 1: The Red Fist Saga Part One	Daredevil (vol. 7) #1–5	#649-653	TPB	144	15 Feb 2023	978-1302926113
2	Daredevil & Elektra by Chip Zdarsky Vol. 2: The Red Fist Saga Part Two	Daredevil (vol. 7) #6–10	#654-658	TPB	112	25 Jul 2023	978-1302932510
3	Daredevil & Elektra by Chip Zdarsky Vol. 3: The Red Fist Saga Part Three	Daredevil (vol. 7) #11–14	#659-662	TPB	112	15 Nov 2023	978-1302947712
Omnibuses
1	Daredevil by Chip Zdarsky Omnibus Vol.1	Daredevil (vol. 6) #1–30; Daredevil Annual (2020)	#613-642	Omnibus	696	23 Jul 2024	Julian Tedesco cover: 978-1302956219
1	Daredevil by Chip Zdarsky Omnibus Vol.1	Daredevil (vol. 6) #1–30; Daredevil Annual (2020)	#613-642	Omnibus	696	23 Jul 2024	Marco Checchetto DM cover: 978-1302956226
2	Daredevil by Chip Zdarsky Omnibus Vol.2	Daredevil (vol. 6) #31–36; Daredevil: Woman Without Fear #1-3; Devil's Reign #1-6; Devil's Reign Omega (2022); Daredevil (vol. 7) #1-14	#643-662	Omnibus	768	31 Dec 2024	Rafael De Latorre cover: 978-1302956264
2	Daredevil by Chip Zdarsky Omnibus Vol.2	Daredevil (vol. 6) #31–36; Daredevil: Woman Without Fear #1-3; Devil's Reign #1-6; Devil's Reign Omega (2022); Daredevil (vol. 7) #1-14	#643-662	Omnibus	768	31 Dec 2024	Marco Checchetto DM cover: 978-1302956271

=== Volume 8 (2023-2025, Saladin Ahmed Era) ===
American poet, Saladin Ahmed, had been working on Marvel's Miles Morales series when he swapped to work on Daredevil, from September 2023. "I felt like I had a new, unique take on Matt and on Hell's Kitchen," he said. "That's at the center of this… him and his world." Ahmed's Daredevil ran for two years, ending in September 2025.

#	Title	Material collected	Legacy	Format	Pages	Released	ISBN
Trade Paperbacks
1	Hell Breaks Loose	Daredevil (vol. 8) #1–5	#663-667	TPB	136	16 Apr 2024	978-1302947729
2	Hell To Pay	Daredevil (vol. 8) #6–10	#668-672	TPB	184	10 Sep 2024	978-1302951238
3	Living Hell	Daredevil (vol. 8) #11–15	#673-677	TPB	112	11 Feb 2025	978-1302954826
4	Last Rites	Daredevil (vol. 8) #16–19; Laura Kinney: Wolverine (2024) #2-3	#678-681	TPB	136	19 Aug 2025	978-1302961473
5	Rites Of Reconciliation	Daredevil (vol. 8) #20–25	#682-687	TPB	136	6 Jan 2026	978-1302961480

=== Volume 9 (2026-present, Stephanie Phillips Era) ===
#	Title	Material collected	Legacy	Format	Pages	Released	ISBN
Trade Paperbacks
1	Tomorrow's Devil	Daredevil (vol. 9) #1–5	#688-692	TPB	128	22 Dec 2026	978-1302965624

== Collected editions by type ==
=== Daredevil Omnibuses ===
#	Title	Years covered	Material collected	Legacy	Pages	Released	ISBN
1	Daredevil Omnibus Vol. 1	1964-1968	Daredevil #1–41, Annual #1 (1967); Fantastic Four (vol. 1) #73; Not Brand Echh #4	#1-41	1,088	14 Feb 2017	Alex Ross cover: 978-1302904272
1	Daredevil Omnibus Vol. 1	1964-1968	Daredevil #1–41, Annual #1 (1967); Fantastic Four (vol. 1) #73; Not Brand Echh #4	#1-41	1,088	14 Feb 2017	Jack Kirby DM cover: 978-1302905187
2	Daredevil Omnibus Vol. 2	1968-1971	Daredevil #42–74; Iron Man #35, material from #36	#42-74	800	30 May 2023	Gene Colan cover: 978-1302948696
2	Daredevil Omnibus Vol. 2	1968-1971	Daredevil #42–74; Iron Man #35, material from #36	#42-74	800	30 May 2023	Gene Colan Unmasked DM cover: 978-1302948702
3	Daredevil Omnibus Vol. 3	1971-1974	Daredevil #75–119; Avengers #111; Marvel Two In One #3; material from Amazing Adventures #1-8	#75-119	1,160	9 Apr 2024	Rich Buckler cover: 978-1302955182
3	Daredevil Omnibus Vol. 3	1971-1974	Daredevil #75–119; Avengers #111; Marvel Two In One #3; material from Amazing Adventures #1-8	#75-119	1,160	9 Apr 2024	John Romita Sr. DM cover: 978-1302955199
4	Daredevil Omnibus Vol. 4	1975-1979	Daredevil ##120-158, Annual #4; Ghost Rider #20; Marvel Premiere (1972) #39-40, #43; material from What If...? #8	#120-158	976	22 Sep 2026	Gil Kane cover: 978-1302968489
4	Daredevil Omnibus Vol. 4	1975-1979	Daredevil ##120-158, Annual #4; Ghost Rider #20; Marvel Premiere (1972) #39-40, #43; material from What If...? #8	#120-158	976	22 Sep 2026	Gene Colan DM cover: 978-1302968496
	Daredevil by Frank Miller & Klaus Janson	1979-1983	Daredevil #158–161, 163–191; What If? #28	#158-191	840	7 Mar 2007	Frank Miller red & black cover: 978-0785126690
	Daredevil by Frank Miller & Klaus Janson	1979-1983	Daredevil #158–161, 163–191; What If? #28	#158-191	840	7 Mar 2007	Daredevil #181 cover: 978-0785123439
	Daredevil by Frank Miller & Klaus Janson	1979-1983	Daredevil #158–161, 163–191; What If? #28	#158-191	840	6 Nov 2013	Frank Miller red & black cover: 978-0785185680
	Daredevil by Frank Miller & Klaus Janson	1979-1983	Daredevil #158–161, 163–191; What If? #28	#158-191	840	2 Mar 2016	Frank Miller red & black cover: 978-0785195368
	Daredevil by Frank Miller & Klaus Janson	1979-1983	Daredevil #158–161, 163–191; What If? #28	#158-191	840	31 Jan 2023	Frank Miller poster cover: 978-1302945534
	Daredevil by Frank Miller & Klaus Janson	1979-1983	Daredevil #158–161, 163–191; What If? #28	#158-191	840	31 Jan 2023	Daredevil #181 cover: 978-1302945541
	Daredevil by Frank Miller Companion	1985-1986	Peter Parker, the Spectacular Spider–Man #27–28; Daredevil #219, 226–233; Daredevil: The Man Without Fear #1–5; Daredevil: Love And War	#219, #226-233	608	28 Dec 2007	David Mazzucchelli Apocalypse cover: 978-0785123507
	Daredevil by Frank Miller Companion	1985-1986	Peter Parker, the Spectacular Spider–Man #27–28; Daredevil #219, 226–233; Daredevil: The Man Without Fear #1–5; Daredevil: Love And War	#219, #226-233	608	28 Dec 2007	Frank Miller red & black DM cover: 978-0785126768
	Daredevil by Frank Miller Companion	1985-1986	Peter Parker, the Spectacular Spider–Man #27–28; Daredevil #219, 226–233; Daredevil: The Man Without Fear #1–5; Daredevil: Love And War	#219, #226-233	608	6 Apr 2016	Frank Miller red & black cover: 978-0785195382
	Daredevil by Frank Miller Companion	1985-1986	Peter Parker, the Spectacular Spider–Man #27–28; Daredevil #219, 226–233; Daredevil: The Man Without Fear #1–5; Daredevil: Love And War	#219, #226-233	608	14 May 2024	Frank Miller red & black cover: 978-1302957650
	Daredevil by Frank Miller Companion	1985-1986	Peter Parker, the Spectacular Spider–Man #27–28; Daredevil #219, 226–233; Daredevil: The Man Without Fear #1–5; Daredevil: Love And War	#219, #226-233	608	14 May 2024	David Mazzucchelli Apocalypse DM cover: 978-1302957667
1	Daredevil by Nocenti & Romita Jr. Vol. 1	1986-1989	Daredevil #234–266; Punisher (1987) #10	#234-266	856	25 Feb 2025	John Romita Jr cover: 978-1302963729
1	Daredevil by Nocenti & Romita Jr. Vol. 1	1986-1989	Daredevil #234–266; Punisher (1987) #10	#234-266	856	25 Feb 2025	Keith Pollard DM cover: 978-1302963736
2	Daredevil by Nocenti & Romita Jr. Vol. 2	1989-1991	Daredevil #267-291, Annual #5-6; Spectacular Spider-Man #213-214; material from Marvel Comics Presents #109-116, 123-130, 150-151; Marvel Holiday Special #2	#267-291	992	28 Jul 2026	John Romita Jr cover: 978-1302968830
2	Daredevil by Nocenti & Romita Jr. Vol. 2	1989-1991	Daredevil #267-291, Annual #5-6; Spectacular Spider-Man #213-214; material from Marvel Comics Presents #109-116, 123-130, 150-151; Marvel Holiday Special #2	#267-291	992	28 Jul 2026	Mark Bagley DM cover: 978-1302968847
	Marvel Knights by Joe Quesada	1998-2006	Daredevil (vol. 2) #1–15, #½; Daredevil: Father #1–6; Marvel Authentix: Daredevil #1; material from Marvel Knights Double–Shot #1	#381-395	730	6 Nov 2018	978-1302914066
1	Daredevil by Brian Michael Bendis & Alex Maleev Vol. 1	2001-2004	Daredevil (vol. 2) #16–19, 26–50, 56–60	#396-440	848	27 Aug 2008	978-0785131120
1	Daredevil by Brian Michael Bendis & Alex Maleev Vol. 1	2001-2004	Daredevil (vol. 2) #16–19, 26–50, 56–60	#396-440	848	8 Jan 2020	978-1302921668
1	Daredevil by Brian Michael Bendis & Alex Maleev Vol. 1	2001-2004	Daredevil (vol. 2) #16–19, 26–50, 56–60	#396-440	848	6 Aug 2024	Alex Maleev cover: 978-1302957636
1	Daredevil by Brian Michael Bendis & Alex Maleev Vol. 1	2001-2004	Daredevil (vol. 2) #16–19, 26–50, 56–60	#396-440	848	6 Aug 2024	David Mack DM cover: 978-1302957643
2	Daredevil by Brian Michael Bendis & Alex Maleev Vol. 2	2004-2006	Daredevil (vol. 2) #61–81; What If...Karen Page Had Lived; Ultimate Marvel Team–Up #6–8	#441-461	656	23 Dec 2009	978-0785138136
2	Daredevil by Brian Michael Bendis & Alex Maleev Vol. 2	2004-2006	Daredevil (vol. 2) #61–81; What If...Karen Page Had Lived; Ultimate Marvel Team–Up #6–8	#441-461	656	12 Feb 2020	978-1302921675
2	Daredevil by Brian Michael Bendis & Alex Maleev Vol. 2	2004-2006	Daredevil (vol. 2) #61–81; What If...Karen Page Had Lived; Ultimate Marvel Team–Up #6–8	#441-461	656	21 Jan 2025	Alex Maleev cover: 978-1302959166
2	Daredevil by Brian Michael Bendis & Alex Maleev Vol. 2	2004-2006	Daredevil (vol. 2) #61–81; What If...Karen Page Had Lived; Ultimate Marvel Team–Up #6–8	#441-461	656	21 Jan 2025	Joe Quesada DM cover: 978-1302959173
1	Daredevil by Ed Brubaker & Michael Lark Vol. 1	2006-2008	Daredevil (vol. 2) #82–105	#462-485	608	3 Jun 2009	978-0785137856
1	Daredevil by Ed Brubaker & Michael Lark Vol. 1	2006-2008	Daredevil (vol. 2) #82–105	#462-485	608	5 Apr 2017	978-1302905088
1	Daredevil by Ed Brubaker & Michael Lark Vol. 1	2006-2008	Daredevil (vol. 2) #82–105	#462-485	608	7 Jun 2022	Marko Djurdjevic cover: 978-1302945510
1	Daredevil by Ed Brubaker & Michael Lark Vol. 1	2006-2008	Daredevil (vol. 2) #82–105	#462-485	608	7 Jun 2022	David Finch DM cover: 978-1302945527
2	Daredevil by Ed Brubaker & Michael Lark Vol. 2	2008-2009	Daredevil (vol. 2) #106–119, Annual #1; Daredevil #500; Blood Of The Tarantula	#486-500	472	3 Jun 2010	978-0785145202
2	Daredevil by Ed Brubaker & Michael Lark Vol. 2	2008-2009	Daredevil (vol. 2) #106–119, Annual #1; Daredevil #500; Blood Of The Tarantula	#486-500	472	3 May 2017	978-1302908591
2	Daredevil by Ed Brubaker & Michael Lark Vol. 2	2008-2009	Daredevil (vol. 2) #106–119, Annual #1; Daredevil #500; Blood Of The Tarantula	#486-500	472	24 Mar 2024	Marko Djurdjevic cover: 978-1302957575
2	Daredevil by Ed Brubaker & Michael Lark Vol. 2	2008-2009	Daredevil (vol. 2) #106–119, Annual #1; Daredevil #500; Blood Of The Tarantula	#486-500	472	24 Mar 2024	Joe Quesada DM cover: 978-1302957582
	Daredevil: Shadowland Omnibus	2009-2011	Daredevil (vol. 2) #501–512; Dark Reign: The List – Daredevil #1; Shadowland #1–5; Shadowland: Elektra, Bullseye, Ghost Rider, Spider–Man, After the Fall; Shadowland: Moon Knight #1–3; Shadowland: Blood On The Streets #1–4; Shadowland: Daughters Of The Shadow #1–3; Shadowland: Power Man #1–4; Thunderbolts (1997) #148–149; Daredevil: Reborn #1–4	#501-512	1,112	7 Feb 2018	John Cassaday cover: 978-1302910372
	Daredevil: Shadowland Omnibus	2009-2011	Daredevil (vol. 2) #501–512; Dark Reign: The List – Daredevil #1; Shadowland #1–5; Shadowland: Elektra, Bullseye, Ghost Rider, Spider–Man, After the Fall; Shadowland: Moon Knight #1–3; Shadowland: Blood On The Streets #1–4; Shadowland: Daughters Of The Shadow #1–3; Shadowland: Power Man #1–4; Thunderbolts (1997) #148–149; Daredevil: Reborn #1–4	#501-512	1,112	7 Feb 2018	Billy Tan DM cover: 978-1302911140
	Daredevil: Shadowland Omnibus	2009-2011	Daredevil (vol. 2) #501–512; Dark Reign: The List – Daredevil #1; Shadowland #1–5; Shadowland: Elektra, Bullseye, Ghost Rider, Spider–Man, After the Fall; Shadowland: Moon Knight #1–3; Shadowland: Blood On The Streets #1–4; Shadowland: Daughters Of The Shadow #1–3; Shadowland: Power Man #1–4; Thunderbolts (1997) #148–149; Daredevil: Reborn #1–4	#501-512	1,112	24 Jul 2024	John Cassaday cover: 978-1302957780
	Daredevil: Shadowland Omnibus	2009-2011	Daredevil (vol. 2) #501–512; Dark Reign: The List – Daredevil #1; Shadowland #1–5; Shadowland: Elektra, Bullseye, Ghost Rider, Spider–Man, After the Fall; Shadowland: Moon Knight #1–3; Shadowland: Blood On The Streets #1–4; Shadowland: Daughters Of The Shadow #1–3; Shadowland: Power Man #1–4; Thunderbolts (1997) #148–149; Daredevil: Reborn #1–4	#501-512	1,112	24 Jul 2024	Billy Tan DM cover: 978-1302957797
1	Daredevil by Mark Waid Omnibus Vol. 1	2011-2013	Daredevil (vol. 3) #1–27, 10.1; Amazing Spider–Man #677; Avenging Spider–Man #6; The Punisher (2011) #10	#513-539	728	1 Mar 2017	978-1302904265
1	Daredevil by Mark Waid Omnibus Vol. 1	2011-2013	Daredevil (vol. 3) #1–27, 10.1; Amazing Spider–Man #677; Avenging Spider–Man #6; The Punisher (2011) #10	#513-539	720	7 Nov 2023	Paolo Rivera cover: 978-1302952778
1	Daredevil by Mark Waid Omnibus Vol. 1	2011-2013	Daredevil (vol. 3) #1–27, 10.1; Amazing Spider–Man #677; Avenging Spider–Man #6; The Punisher (2011) #10	#513-539	720	7 Nov 2023	Neal Adams DM cover: 978-1302952785
2	Daredevil by Mark Waid & Chris Samnee Omnibus Vol. 2	2013-2015	Daredevil (vol. 3) #28–36; Indestructible Hulk #9–10; Daredevil (vol. 4) #1–18, #1.50, #0.1, #15.1	#540-566	768	7 Mar 2018	978-1302908980
2	Daredevil by Mark Waid & Chris Samnee Omnibus Vol. 2	2013-2015	Daredevil (vol. 3) #28–36; Indestructible Hulk #9–10; Daredevil (vol. 4) #1–18, #1.50, #0.1, #15.1	#540-566	768	3 Jan 2024	Chris Samnee cover: 978-1302952808
2	Daredevil by Mark Waid & Chris Samnee Omnibus Vol. 2	2013-2015	Daredevil (vol. 3) #28–36; Indestructible Hulk #9–10; Daredevil (vol. 4) #1–18, #1.50, #0.1, #15.1	#540-566	768	3 Jan 2024	Frank Cho DM cover: 978-1302952815
	Daredevil by Charles Soule Omnibus	2015-2019	Daredevil (vol. 5) #1–28 and #595–612; Daredevil Annual (2016); Daredevil/Punisher: Seventh Circle #1–4 and material from All–New, All–Different Point One #1	#567–612	1,126	4 Jan 2022	Phil Noto cover: 978-1302929657
	Daredevil by Charles Soule Omnibus	2015-2019	Daredevil (vol. 5) #1–28 and #595–612; Daredevil Annual (2016); Daredevil/Punisher: Seventh Circle #1–4 and material from All–New, All–Different Point One #1	#567–612	1,126	4 Jan 2022	David Lopez DM cover: 978-1302929664
	Daredevil by Charles Soule Omnibus	2015-2019	Daredevil (vol. 5) #1–28 and #595–612; Daredevil Annual (2016); Daredevil/Punisher: Seventh Circle #1–4 and material from All–New, All–Different Point One #1	#567–612	1,126	2 Mar 2027	Phil Noto cover: 978-1302971939
	Daredevil by Charles Soule Omnibus	2015-2019	Daredevil (vol. 5) #1–28 and #595–612; Daredevil Annual (2016); Daredevil/Punisher: Seventh Circle #1–4 and material from All–New, All–Different Point One #1	#567–612	1,126	2 Mar 2027	David Lopez DM cover: 978-1302971922
1	Daredevil by Chip Zdarsky Omnibus Vol. 1	2019-2021	Daredevil (vol. 6) #1–30, Annual (2020)	#613-642	696	23 Jul 2024	Julian Tedesco cover: 978-1302956219
1	Daredevil by Chip Zdarsky Omnibus Vol. 1	2019-2021	Daredevil (vol. 6) #1–30, Annual (2020)	#613-642	696	23 Jul 2024	Marco Checchetto DM cover: 978-1302956226
	Devil's Reign	2021-2022	Devil's Reign #1–6; Spider-Woman (2020) #18–19; Daredevil: Woman Without Fear #1–3; Devil's Reign: Superior Four #1–3; Devil's Reign: Villains for Hire #1–3; Devil's Reign: Winter Soldier; Devil's Reign: X-Men #1–3; Devil's Reign: Spider-Man; Moon Knight (2021) #8; Devil's Reign: Moon Knight; Devil's Reign: Omega		656	9 Jan 2024	Marco Checchetto cover: 978-1302952921
	Devil's Reign	2021-2022	Devil's Reign #1–6; Spider-Woman (2020) #18–19; Daredevil: Woman Without Fear #1–3; Devil's Reign: Superior Four #1–3; Devil's Reign: Villains for Hire #1–3; Devil's Reign: Winter Soldier; Devil's Reign: X-Men #1–3; Devil's Reign: Spider-Man; Moon Knight (2021) #8; Devil's Reign: Moon Knight; Devil's Reign: Omega		656	9 Jan 2024	In-Hyuk Lee DM cover: 978-1302952938
2	Daredevil by Chip Zdarsky Omnibus Vol. 2	2021-2023	Daredevil (vol. 6) #31–36; Daredevil: Woman Without Fear (2022) #1–3; Devil's Reign (2021) #1–6; Devil's Reign Omega (2022); Daredevil (vol. 7) #1–14	#643-662	768	31 Dec 2024	Rafael De Latorre cover: 978-1302956264
2	Daredevil by Chip Zdarsky Omnibus Vol. 2	2021-2023	Daredevil (vol. 6) #31–36; Daredevil: Woman Without Fear (2022) #1–3; Devil's Reign (2021) #1–6; Devil's Reign Omega (2022); Daredevil (vol. 7) #1–14	#643-662	768	31 Dec 2024	Marco Checchetto DM cover: 978-1302956271

=== Daredevil oversized hardcovers ===
#	Title	Years covered	Material collected	Pages	Released	ISBN
1	Daredevil Vol. 1	1998-2001	Daredevil (vol. 2) #1–15, #½	336	8 Apr 2003	978-0785110156
1	Daredevil Vol. 1	1998-2001	Daredevil (vol. 2) #1–15, #½	336	13 Sep 2006	978-0785124016
2	Daredevil Vol. 2	2001-2002	Daredevil (vol. 2) #26-37	288	4 Dec 2002	978-0785109266
3	Daredevil Vol. 3	2002-2003	Daredevil (vol. 2) #38-50	320	1 Mar 2004	978-0785111061
4	Daredevil Vol. 4	2004	Daredevil (vol. 2) #56-65	280	31 Aug 2005	978-0785113423
5	Daredevil Vol. 5	2004-2005	Daredevil (vol. 2) #66-75	256	28 Jun 2006	978-0785121107
6	Daredevil Vol. 6	2001, 2005–2006	Daredevil (vol. 2) #16-19, #76-81	304	11 Oct 2006	978-0785121114
1	Daredevil by Mark Waid, Vol. 1	2011-2012	Daredevil (vol. 3) #1–10, 10.1, Amazing Spider–Man #677	288	26 Feb 2013	978-0785168065
2	Daredevil by Mark Waid, Vol. 2	2012-2013	Daredevil (vol. 3) #11–21, Avenging Spider–Man #6, Punisher #10	296	25 Feb 2014	978-0785184799
3	Daredevil by Mark Waid, Vol. 3	2013-2014	Daredevil (vol. 3) #22–36, Indestructible Hulk #9–10	368	15 Jul 2014	978-0785190233
4	Daredevil by Mark Waid & Chris Samnee Vol. 4	2014	Daredevil (vol. 4) #1–10, 0.1, 1.50	312	16 Feb 2016	978-0785195344
5	Daredevil by Mark Waid & Chris Samnee Vol. 5	2015	Daredevil (vol. 4) #11–18, 15.1	216	17 May 2016	978-1302900601
1	Daredevil by Chip Zdarsky Vol. 1: To Heaven Through Hell	2019	Daredevil (vol. 6) #1–10	232	17 Mar 2021	978-1302928247
2	Daredevil by Chip Zdarsky Vol. 2: To Heaven Through Hell	2019-2020	Daredevil (vol. 6) #11–20	224	23 Mar 2022	978-1302931995
3	Daredevil by Chip Zdarsky Vol. 3: To Heaven Through Hell	2020-2021	Daredevil (vol. 6) #21–30, Daredevil Annual (2020)	264	2 Nov 2022	978-1302945114
4	Daredevil by Chip Zdarsky Vol. 4: To Heaven Through Hell	2021	Daredevil (vol. 6) #31–36, Daredevil: Woman Without Fear #1–3	264	19 Jul 2023	978-1302950057
Miniseries
	Daredevil/Elektra: Love And War	1986-1987	Marvel Graphic Novel: Daredevil: Love And War, Elektra: Assassin #1-8	328	6 Nov 2002	978-0785110323
	Daredevil: Yellow	2001-2002	Daredevil: Yellow #1-6	160	18 Sep 2002	978-0785108405
	Daredevil: Father	2004-2007	Daredevil: Father #1-6	200	20 Dec 2006	978-0785115441
	Daredevil: End Of Days	2008	Daredevil: End Of Days #1-8	232	3 Jul 2018	978-0785124207

=== Marvel Masterworks ===
Launched in 1987, Marvel Masterworks was Marvel Comics' first attempt at republishing a series in full colour, beginning with a character's first appearance.

#	Title	Years covered	Material collected	Pages	Released	ISBN
1	Marvel Masterworks: Daredevil Vol. 1	1964-65	Daredevil #1–11	256	Sep 1991	978-0785145639
1	Marvel Masterworks: Daredevil Vol. 1	1964-65	Daredevil #1–11	256	Dec 2003	978-0785112570
2	Marvel Masterworks: Daredevil Vol. 2	1966	Daredevil #12–21	224	Oct 2001	978-0785150503
2	Marvel Masterworks: Daredevil Vol. 2	1966	Daredevil #12–21	224	Feb 2004	978-0785112655
3	Marvel Masterworks: Daredevil Vol. 3	1966-67	Daredevil #22–32, Annual #1	304	16 Feb 2005	978-0785116967
4	Marvel Masterworks: Daredevil Vol. 4	1967-68	Daredevil #33–41; Fantastic Four #73	224	28 Feb 2007	978-0785120728
5	Marvel Masterworks: Daredevil Vol. 5	1968-69	Daredevil #42–53; Not Brand Echh #4	272	21 Jan 2009	978-0785130420
6	Marvel Masterworks: Daredevil Vol. 6	1969-70	Daredevil #54–63	224	10 Aug 2011	978-0785150206
7	Marvel Masterworks: Daredevil Vol. 7	1970-71	Daredevil #64–74; The Invincible Iron Man #35–36	264	18 Sep 2013	978-0785166443
8	Marvel Masterworks: Daredevil Vol. 8	1971-72	Daredevil #75–84; Amazing Adventures #1–8	312	14 May 2014	978-0785188414
9	Marvel Masterworks: Daredevil Vol. 9	1972	Daredevil #85–96	272	16 Sep 2015	978-0785191520
10	Marvel Masterworks: Daredevil Vol. 10	1973-74	Daredevil #97–107; Avengers #111	264	10 Feb 2016	978-0785199175
11	Marvel Masterworks: Daredevil Vol. 11	1974-75	Daredevil #108–119; Marvel Two–In–One #3	264	Mar 2017	978-1302903466
12	Marvel Masterworks: Daredevil Vol. 12	1975-76	Daredevil #120–132; material from FOOM #13	288	Jan 2018	978-1302909680
13	Marvel Masterworks: Daredevil Vol. 13	1976-77	Daredevil #133–143; Annual #4; Ghost Rider #20; Marvel Premiere #39–40; material from Ghost Rider #19	312	Mar 2019	978-1302916343
14	Marvel Masterworks: Daredevil Vol. 14	1977-79	Daredevil #144–158; Marvel Premiere #43	320	Jan 2020	978-1302921637
15	Marvel Masterworks: Daredevil Vol. 15	1979-81	Daredevil #159–172; material from Bizarre Adventures #25	368	Jun 2021	978-1302929275
16	Marvel Masterworks: Daredevil Vol. 16	1982-83	Daredevil #173–181; What If #28 and #35; Bizarre Adventures #28; Marvel Fanfare #1	344	Jun 2022	978-1302933166
17	Marvel Masterworks: Daredevil Vol. 17	1982-83	Daredevil #182–191; material from Elektra Saga #1–4 and Official Handbook of the Marvel Universe (1983)	368	Apr 2023	978-1302949259
18	Marvel Masterworks: Daredevil Vol. 18	1983-84	Daredevil #192–203, material from Marvel Fanfare #7, 10–13	392	Jan 2024	978-1302953164
19	Marvel Masterworks: Daredevil Vol. 19	1984-85	Daredevil #204-214	296	May 2025	978-1302962296

=== Mighty Marvel Masterworks ===
In 2021, Marvel launched a new version of Masterworks books as "more affordable versions of this once high-priced line". These were paperbacks, sized at 6-by-9in digest editions.

#	Title	Years covered	Material collected	Pages	Released	ISBN
1	While The City Sleeps...	1964-1965	Daredevil #1-11	248	Mar 2022	978-1302934408
2	Alone Against The Underworld	1966	Daredevil #12-21	216	Mar 2023	978-1302948917
3	Unmasked	1966-1967	Daredevil #22-31	224	Apr 2024	978-1302954284

=== Marvel Premiere Classics ===
Beginning in 2006, the Premiere Classic hardcover line "compiled selected storylines from ... five decades of Marvel history". It was cancelled in 2012 after 107 volumes.

#	Title	Material collected	Pages	Released	ISBN
18	The Man Without Fear	Daredevil: The Man Without Fear #1–5	224	Dec 2008	Bookstore cover: 978-0785134787
18	The Man Without Fear	Daredevil: The Man Without Fear #1–5	224	Dec 2008	Direct Market cover: 978-0785136569
19	Born Again	Daredevil #226-233	248	Jan 2009	Bookstore cover: 978-0785134800
19	Born Again	Daredevil #226-233	248	Jan 2009	Direct Market cover: 978-0785136552

=== Marvel Gallery Edition Hardcovers ===
Marvel's Gallery Editions are large-format hardcovers that "emphasise the size of the pages printed rather than the amount of comics within. (This means) 13in/33cm in height, and 9.3in/24cm in width".

Title	Issues collected	Pages	Released	ISBN
Born Again	Daredevil #226-233	248	21 Aug 2023	978-1302953041
Daredevil / Elektra: Love And War	Marvel Graphic Novel: Daredevil: Love And War, Elektra: Assassin #1-8	326	2 Sep 2020	978-1302923327
Guardian Devil	Daredevil (vol.2) #1-8, #½	296	5 Sep 2023	978-1302950170
Jeph Loeb & Tim Sale: Daredevil	Daredevil: Yellow #1–6	168	31 Oct 2023	978-1302952754
Jeph Loeb & Tim Sale: Daredevil	Daredevil: Yellow #1–6	168	31 Oct 2023	DM cover: 978-1302952761

=== Epic Collections ===
Marvel launched the Epic Collections line of collected comics in 2013. Marvel Senior Vice President of Sales David Gabriel said they were intended to be: "big, fat, color collections at the best price we can maintain."

Though the books are often published out of order, Gabriel added: "When all is said and done, the Epic volumes will fit seamlessly next to one another on readers' bookshelves, presenting a complete and unbroken run of each title!"

The first Daredevil Epic released was Volume 18: Fall From Grace.

#	Subtitle	Years covered	Issues collected	Writers	Artists	Pages	Released	ISBN
1	The Man Without Fear	1964-1966	Daredevil #1–21	Stan Lee	Wally Wood, John Romita Sr.	472	13 Jul 2016	978-0785195481
1	The Man Without Fear	1964-1966	Daredevil #1–21	Stan Lee	Wally Wood, John Romita Sr.	472	14 Feb 2023	978-1302950361
2	Mike Murdock Must Die!	1966-1968	Daredevil #22–41, Annual #1, Fantastic Four #73; material from Not Brand Echh #4	Stan Lee	Gene Colan	520	14 Feb 2018	978-1302910044
2	Mike Murdock Must Die!	1966-1968	Daredevil #22–41, Annual #1, Fantastic Four #73; material from Not Brand Echh #4	Stan Lee	Gene Colan	520	24 Oct 2023	978-1302950569
3	Brother, Take My Hand	1968-1970	Daredevil #42–63	Stan Lee, Roy Thomas	Gene Colan, Barry Windsor Smith	472	22 Feb 2017	978-1302904258
4	A Woman Called Widow	1970-1972	Daredevil #64–86, Iron Man #35; material from Iron Man #36	Roy Thomas, Gerry Conway	Gene Colan	512	6 Nov 2019	978-1302920340
4	A Woman Called Widow	1970-1972	Daredevil #64–86, Iron Man #35; material from Iron Man #36	Roy Thomas, Gerry Conway	Gene Colan	512	20 Feb 2024	978-1302957933
5	Going Out West	1972-1974	Daredevil #87-107, Avengers #111	Gerry Conway, Steve Gerber	Gene Colan, Don Heck	472	18 Jan 2022	978-1302933555
6	Watch Out For Bullseye	1974-1976	Daredevil #108-132, Marvel Two-in-One #3	Steve Gerber, Tony Isabella, Marv Wolfman	Bob Brown, Gene Colan	528	28 Mar 2023	978-1302948672
7	The Concrete Jungle	1976-1978	Daredevil #133-154, Annual 4; Ghost Rider #20; Marvel Premiere #39-40, 43; material from Ghost Rider #19	Marv Wolfman, Jim Shooter, Roger McKenzie	Bob Brown, Gil Kane, Carmine Infantino	528	2 Apr 2024	978-1302955175
8	To Dare The Devil	1978-1981	Daredevil #155-176; material from What If #28, Bizarre Adventures #28	Frank Miller, Roger McKenzie	Frank Miller, Frank Robbins	496	2 Sep 2025	978-1302960537
9	Resurrection	1981-1983	Daredevil #177-193; material from Marvel Fanfare #1; What If? (1977) #35	Frank Miller, Alan Brennert	Frank Miller, Klaus Janson	496	1 Dec 2026	978-1302967925
10	Redemption	1983-1984	Daredevil #194-215	Dennis O'Neil, Steven Grant	David Mazzucchelli, William Johnson	520	9 Mar 2027	978-1302971168
12	It Comes With The Claws	1986-1988	Daredevil #234-252	Ann Nocenti	Steve Ditko, Louis Williams, Rick Leonardi, John Romita Jr.	480	1 Nov 2022	978-1302945947
13	A Touch Of Typhoid	1988-1989	Daredevil #253–270; Punisher #10	Ann Nocenti	John Romita Jr.	472	20 Jan 2016	978-0785196884
13	A Touch Of Typhoid	1988-1989	Daredevil #253–270; Punisher #10	Ann Nocenti	John Romita Jr.	472	11 Jul 2023	978-1302950491
14	Heart Of Darkness	1989-1990	Daredevil #271–282, Annual #5–6; material from Punisher Annual #3, Incredible Hulk Annual #16 and Silver Surfer Annual #3	Gregory Wright, Ann Nocenti, Peter David	Mark Bagley, John Romita Jr. Angel Medina	488	20 Sep 2017	978-1302907914
14	Heart Of Darkness	1989-1990	Daredevil #271–282, Annual #5–6; material from Punisher Annual #3, Incredible Hulk Annual #16 and Silver Surfer Annual #3	Gregory Wright, Ann Nocenti, Peter David	Mark Bagley, John Romita Jr. Angel Medina	488	8 Feb 2022	978-1302933777
15	Last Rites	1990-1992	Daredevil #283-300, Annual #7	Gregory Wright, Ann Nocenti, Daniel Chichester	Lee Weeks, Kieron Dwyer, Ron Garney	504	1 Dec 2020	978-1302925635
15	Last Rites	1990-1992	Daredevil #283-300, Annual #7	Gregory Wright, Ann Nocenti, Daniel Chichester	Lee Weeks, Kieron Dwyer, Ron Garney	504	12 Dec 2023	978-1302950590
16	Dead Man's Hand	1992-1993	Daredevil #301-311, Annual #8, Nomad #4-6, Punisher War Journal #45-47; material from Marvel Holiday Special #2	Daniel Chichester, Fabian Nicieza	M.C. Wyman, Scott McDaniel, Pat Olliffe	472	30 Nov 2021	978-1302932381
17	Into The Fire	1993-1994	Daredevil #312-318, Annual #9, Daredevil/Black Widow: Abattoir, Daredevil: The Man Without Fear #1-5	Daniel Chichester, Frank Miller	Scott McDaniel, John Romita Jr.	528	8 Aug 2023	978-1302953720
18	Fall From Grace	1993-1994	Daredevil #319–332, Annual #10	Daniel Chichester, Gregory Wright	Scott McDaniel, Sergio Cariello, Kris Renkewitz	456	9 Apr 2014	978-0785185161
18	Fall From Grace	1993-1994	Daredevil #319–332, Annual #10	Daniel Chichester, Gregory Wright	Scott McDaniel, Sergio Cariello, Kris Renkewitz	456	4 Jun 2024	978-1302957872
19	Root Of Evil	1994-1995	Daredevil #333–344; Elektra: Root of Evil #1–4	Gregory Wright, Daniel Chichester	Tom Grindberg, Scott McDaniel, Alexander Jubran, Keith Pollard	440	25 Jul 2018	978-1302912581
19	Root Of Evil	1994-1995	Daredevil #333–344; Elektra: Root of Evil #1–4	Gregory Wright, Daniel Chichester	Tom Grindberg, Scott McDaniel, Alexander Jubran, Keith Pollard	440	13 Aug 2024	978-1302957919
20	Purgatory & Paradise	1995-1997	Daredevil #345–364	J.M. DeMatteis, Karl Kesel	Ron Wagner, Cary Nord, Shawn McManus, Gene Colan	488	5 Jun 2019	978-1302918798
21	Widow's Kiss	1997-1998	Daredevil #365–380, −1; Daredevil/Deadpool Annual '97	Joe Kelly, Scott Lobdell	Gene Colan, Ariel Olivetti, Cully Hamner, Tom Morgan	504	19 Aug 2015	978-0785192978

=== Modern Era Epic Collections ===
Daredevil's Modern Era begins among the earliest of Marvel superheroes. The first issue collected will be Daredevil (vol. 2) #1, from 1998. In comparison, for books like Spider-Man (2001) and Avengers (2004), the collections begin later.

#	Subtitle	Years covered	Issues collected	Legacy	Writers	Artists	Pages	Released	ISBN
Jump to: Daredevil Epic Collection
1	Guardian Devil	1998-2000	Daredevil (vol. 2) #0-15, ½	#381-395	Kevin Smith, David Mack	Joe Quesada, Rob Haynes	440	23 Feb 2027	Daredevil (vol. 2) #1 cover: 978-1302972141
2	Underboss	2000-2002	Daredevil (vol. 2) #16-31; Daredevil: Ninja #1-3	#396-411	Brian Michael Bendis, Bob Gale	Rob Haynes, David Mack, Phil Winslade, Dave Ross, Alex Maleev	472	27 Feb 2024	Daredevil (vol. 2) #26 cover: 978-1302956332
3	Out	2002-2003	Daredevil (vol. 2) #32-50	#412-430	Brian Michael Bendis	Alex Maleev, Manuel Gutierrez, Terry Dodson	448	15 Oct 2024	Daredevil (vol. 2) #36 cover: 978-1302956370
4	King Of Hell's Kitchen	2003-2004	Daredevil (vol. 2) #51-65; What If... Karen Page Had Lived? (2004)	#431-445	Brian Michael Bendis, David Mack	Alex Maleev, Michael Golden, Greg Horn, Philip Russell, Phil Hester, Chris Bachalo, Michael Lark	408	11 Feb 2025	Daredevil (vol. 2) #65 cover: 978-1302956424
5	The Murdock Papers	2004-2006	Daredevil (vol. 2) #66-81	#446-461	Brian Michael Bendis	Alex Maleev	432	10 Feb 2026	Daredevil (vol. 2) #66 cover: 978-1302966966
6	The Devil In Cell-Block D	2006-2007	Daredevil (vol. 2) #82-94, Annual (2007)	#462-474	Ed Brubaker	Michael Lark, Ande Parks, David Aja, Lee Weeks, Leandro Fernández	376	1 Jul 2025	Daredevil (vol. 2) #86 cover: 978-1302964337

=== Marvel Premier Collection ===
In late 2024, Marvel Comics announced plans for the Premier Collection, a new line of paperback digests "featuring Marvel's most celebrated and prestigious storylines and creators from its entire comic book legacy". Similar in size and scope to DC Comics' Compact line, the books measure 6in x 9in.

Daredevil: Born Again was released in February 2025, with a new afterword by writer, Frank Miller; and an foreword from actor Charlie Cox, who plays Matt Murdock in the Daredevil television series.

Title	Material collected	Released	ISBN
Daredevil: Born Again	Daredevil (vol. 1) #226-233	4 Feb 2025	978-1302965983

=== Marvel Platinum ===
The Marvel Platinum series was produced by Panini UK, focusing on a different Marvel superhero each month. Its aim was to reproduce a series of 'definitive' stories, largely aimed at new readers.

Title	Material collected	Released	ISBN
Marvel Platinum: The Definitive Daredevil	Daredevil (vol. 1) #1, 47, 131–132, 170–171, 181; Daredevil (vol. 2) #5, 50; Daredevil (vol. 4) #22, 35; Daredevil (vol. 5) #1.5	8 Feb 2016	978-1846537042

=== Essential Marvel ===
Running from 1996, Essential Marvel reprinted issues in black-and-white paperback format. It was discontinued in 2013, and replaced by the Epic Collection.

#	Title	Material collected	Format	Pages	Released	ISBN
1	Essential Daredevil Vol. 1	Daredevil #1–25	B&W TPB	544	1 Oct 2002	978-0785118619
2	Essential Daredevil Vol. 2	Daredevil #26–48; Daredevil Special #1; Fantastic Four #73	B&W TPB	568	1 Jun 2004	978-0785114628
3	Essential Daredevil Vol. 3	Daredevil #49–74; Iron Man #35–36	B&W TPB	584	24 Aug 2005	978-0785117247
4	Essential Daredevil Vol. 4	Daredevil #75–101; Avengers #111	B&W TPB	600	12 Sep 2007	978-0785127628
5	Essential Daredevil Vol. 5	Daredevil #102–125; Marvel Two-in-One #3	B&W TPB	488	10 Feb 2010	978-0785144540
6	Essential Daredevil Vol. 6	Daredevil #126–146, Annual #4; Iron Man #88–89; Ghost Rider Vol. 2 #20	B&W TPB	480	26 Nov 2013	978-0785185086

== Limited Series ==
#	Title	Material collected	Format	Pages	Released	ISBN
Trade Paperbacks
	Daredevil: Ninja	Daredevil: Ninja #1–3	TPB	80	3 Sep 2001	978-0785107804
	Daredevil/Spider-Man: Unusual Suspects	Daredevil/Spider-Man #1-4	TPB	96	Sep 2001	978-1302907006
1	Daredevil Legends: Yellow	Daredevil: Yellow #1–6	TPB	144	21 Jan 2003	978-0785109693
	Daredevil: Yellow	Daredevil: Yellow #1–6	HC	168	17 Dec 2008	978-0785134442
	Jeph Loeb & Tim Sale: Daredevil	Daredevil: Yellow #1–6	TPB	168	4 Mar 2025	978-1302962012
3	Daredevil Legends: The Man Without Fear	Daredevil: The Man Without Fear #1–5	TPB	160	Oct 2001	978-0785100461
	Daredevil: The Man Without Fear	Daredevil: The Man Without Fear #1–5	TPB	224	16 Jun 2010	978-0785134794
	Daredevil: Redemption	Daredevil: Redemption #1–6	TPB	144	Oct 2005	978-0785115663
	Daredevil vs Punisher: Means And Ends	Daredevil vs Punisher #1–6	TPB	114	7 Jun 2006	978-1302901264
	Daredevil: Battlin' Jack Murdock	Daredevil: Battlin' Jack Murdock # 1–4	TPB	104	9 Jan 2008	978-0785125341
	Daredevil: Father	Daredevil: Father #1–6	TPB	200	15 Jul 2009	978-0785119258
	Daredevil: Reborn	Daredevil: Reborn #1–4	TPB	112	18 Jan 2012	978-0785151333
	Daredevil: Season One	Original Graphic Novel	HC	136	25 Apr 2012	978-0785156437
	Daredevil: Typhoid's Kiss	Typhoid 1–4, Marvel Comics Presents (1988) #150–151, Spectacular Spider–Man (vol. 1) #213–214; material from Marvel Comics Presents (1988) #109–116, 123–130; Girl Comics (2010) #3	TPB	416	11 Aug 2015	978-0785193265
	Daredevil: Dark Nights	Daredevil: Dark Nights #1–8	TPB	192	6 May 2014	978-0785167990
	Daredevil: End Of Days	Daredevil: End Of Days #1–8	TPB	216	18 Apr 2014	978-0785143376
	Daredevil/Punisher: Seventh Circle	Daredevil/Punisher: Seventh Circle #1–4	TPB	128	18 Oct 2016	978-1302902322
	Man Without Fear: The Death Of Daredevil	Man Without Fear #1–5	TPB	112	14 May 2019	978-1302917487
	War Of The Realms: Amazing Spider-Man/Daredevil	War Of The Realms: Amazing Spider-Man #1-3, War Scrolls #1-3 (Daredevil story)	TPB	128	24 Sep 2019	978-1302919283
	Devil's Reign	Devil's Reign #1–6	TPB	208	25 Aug 2022	978-1302932848
	Daredevil: Woman Without Fear	Daredevil: Woman Without Fear #1–3	TPB	120	26 Jul 2022	978-1302934934
	Daredevil & Echo	Daredevil & Echo #1-5	TPB	136	21 Nov 2023	978-1302952174
	Daredevil: Black Armor	Daredevil: Black Armor #1-4	TPB	112	7 May 2024	978-1302952273
	Daredevil: Gang War	Daredevil: Gang War #1-4	TPB	112	10 Sep 2024	978-1302957018
	Daredevil: Woman Without Fear - Bloody Reunion	Daredevil: Woman Without Fear (vol. 2) #1-5	TPB	120	18 Mar 2025	978-1302959180
	Daredevil: Unleash Hell (Red Band)	Daredevil: Unleash Hell (Red Band) #1-5	TPB	120	9 Sep 2025	978-1302964665
	Daredevil: Cold Day In Hell	Daredevil: Cold Day In Hell #1-3	HC	128	24 Feb 2026	978-1302968311
	Daredevil/Punisher: The Devil's Trigger	Daredevil/Punisher: The Devil's Trigger #1-5	TPB	120	25 Aug 2026	978-1302968656
Marvel Gallery Editions
	Jeph Loeb & Tim Sale: Daredevil Gallery Edition	Daredevil: Yellow #1–6	Gallery HC	168	31 Oct 2023	978-1302952754
	Jeph Loeb & Tim Sale: Daredevil Gallery Edition	Daredevil: Yellow #1–6	Gallery HC	168	31 Oct 2023	DM cover: 978-1302952761
Oversized Hardcovers
	Daredevil/Elektra: Love And War	Marvel Graphic Novel: Daredevil: Love And War, Elektra: Assassin #1-8	OHC	328	6 Nov 2002	978-0785110323
	Daredevil: Yellow	Daredevil: Yellow #1-6	OHC	160	18 Sep 2002	978-0785108405
	Daredevil: Father	Daredevil: Father #1-6	OHC	200	20 Dec 2006	978-0785115441
	Yellow, Blue & Gray by Jeph Loeb and Tim Sale	Daredevil: Yellow #1–6; Spider-Man: Blue #1–6; Hulk: Gray #1–6	OHC	540	19 Aug 2014	978-0785188315
	Daredevil: End Of Days	Daredevil: End Of Days #1-8	OHC	232	3 Jul 2018	978-0785124207
Omnibuses
	Yellow, Blue, Gray And White by Jeph Loeb and Tim Sale	Daredevil: Yellow #1–6; Spider-Man: Blue #1–6; Hulk: Gray #1–6; Captain America: White #0–5	Omnibus	664	4 Dec 2018	978-0785198376
	Daredevil: Shadowland	Dark Reign: The List – Daredevil, Daredevil: Reborn #1–4, and more	Omnibus	1,112	7 Feb 2018	John Cassaday cover: 978-1302910372
	Daredevil: Shadowland	Dark Reign: The List – Daredevil, Daredevil: Reborn #1–4, and more	Omnibus	1,112	7 Feb 2018	Billy Tan DM cover: 978-1302911140
	Daredevil: Shadowland	Dark Reign: The List – Daredevil, Daredevil: Reborn #1–4, and more	Omnibus	1,112	24 Jul 2024	John Cassaday cover: 978-1302957780
	Daredevil: Shadowland	Dark Reign: The List – Daredevil, Daredevil: Reborn #1–4, and more	Omnibus	1,112	24 Jul 2024	Billy Tan DM cover: 978-1302957797
	Devil's Reign	Devil's Reign #1-6, and other material	Omnibus	656	9 Jan 2024	Marco Checchetto cover: 978-1302952921
	Devil's Reign	Devil's Reign #1-6, and other material	Omnibus	656	9 Jan 2024	In-Hyuk Lee DM cover: 978-1302952938

== Other versions of Daredevil ==
Title	Material collected	Format	Pages	Released	ISBN
Ultimate Daredevil and Elektra	Ultimate Daredevil and Elektra #1–4	TPB	128	3 Feb 2003	978-0785110767
Marvel Knights 2099	Marvel Knights 2099: Daredevil #1, Marvel Knights 2099: Black Panther #1, Marvel Knights 2099: Inhumans #1, Marvel Knights 2099: Punisher #1, & Marvel Knights 2099: Mutant #1	TPB	120	19 Jan 2005	978-0785116134
Daredevil Noir	Daredevil: Noir #1–4	HC	112	2 Dec 2009	978-0785139416
Daredevil Noir	Daredevil: Noir #1–4	TPB	112	21 Apr 2010	978-0785121541

== See also ==
- Spider-Man Collected Editions
- Marvel Omnibus
- Marvel oversized hardcovers
- Marvel Gallery Editions
- Marvel Epic Collections
- Marvel Premier Collection
- Marvel Complete Collections
- Marvel Masterworks
- Essential Marvel
