= Marvel Gallery Editions =

Large-format Gallery Edition comic books

Marvel Gallery Editions are large-format premium hardcovers that "emphasise the size of the pages printed rather than the amount of comics within. (This means) 13in/33cm in height, and 9.3in/24cm in width". The unusual size makes it close to 3 inches (7.6 cm) taller and wider than a regular trade paperback.

The first Gallery Edition – Thor & Loki: Blood Brothers – was pitched as an "Oversized Hardcover", and released in August 2019 to tie into the Loki TV series.

The initial use of the term Gallery Edition came a month later, when X-Men by Roy Thomas & Neal Adams HC was retitled to X-Men by Roy Thomas & Neal Adams HC Gallery Edition. The book debuted at no.68 in the graphic novel chart (no.32 for dollar rank).

The series has reproduced all four of Jeph Loeb and Tim Sale's 'colors' books, which "explore important figures in the lives of Marvel's greatest heroes, including Captain America, the Hulk, and Daredevil". The first was Spider-Man: Blue in July 2023. Daredevil: Yellow followed in October 2023, Hulk: Gray in March 2024, and Captain America: White completed the set in July 2024.

For 2025, the company announced Marvel Masterpieces, a new version of the Gallery Edition. This format "will collect some of Marvel's most iconic and beloved stories ... in original format, serving as a time capsule that looks into the pop culture world of the 80s. The stories ... are presented as they were when initially released – complete with classic ads, fan letter, editorial and bullpen bulletin pages."

By the time of solicitation, the moniker had been switched to Marvel Archive Edition. The first release in the series will be Amazing Spider-Man: The Black Costume Year One on 22 July 2025, then Marvel Super Heroes Secret Wars in September.

== Avengers ==
Title	Years covered	Material collected	Pages	Released	ISBN
Avengers: Kree/Skrull War	1971-1972	Avengers #89-97	240	7 Feb 2023	978-1302949594

== Captain America ==
Title	Years covered	Material collected	Pages	Released	ISBN
Jeph Loeb & Tim Sale: Captain America	2008	Captain America: White #0-5	160	16 Jul 2024	978-1302953102
Jeph Loeb & Tim Sale: Captain America	2008	Captain America: White #0-5	160	16 Jul 2024	DM cover: 978-1302953119

== Captain Marvel ==
Title	Years covered	Material collected	Pages	Released	ISBN
The Death Of Captain Marvel	1982	Marvel Super Heroes #12-13, Captain Marvel #1, 34; Marvel Spotlight #1-2, Marvel Graphic Novel No. 1: The Death Of Captain Marvel	184	9 Nov 2021	978-1302931322

== Daredevil ==
Title	Years covered	Material collected	Pages	Released	ISBN
Born Again	1986	Daredevil #226-233	248	21 Aug 2023	978-1302953041
Daredevil / Elektra: Love And War	1982-1986	Marvel Graphic Novel: Daredevil: Love And War, Elektra: Assassin #1-8	326	2 Sep 2020	978-1302923327
Guardian Devil	1998-1999	Daredevil (vol.2) #1-8, #½	296	5 Sep 2023	978-1302950170
Jeph Loeb & Tim Sale: Daredevil	2001-2002	Daredevil: Yellow #1–6	168	31 Oct 2023	978-1302952754
Jeph Loeb & Tim Sale: Daredevil	2001-2002	Daredevil: Yellow #1–6	168	31 Oct 2023	DM cover: 978-1302952761

== Disney characters ==
Title	Years covered	Material collected	Pages	Released	ISBN
Uncle Scrooge And The Infinity Dime	2024	Uncle Scrooge And The Infinity Dime, plus bonus material	96	18 Mar 2025	Alex Ross cover: 978-1302963460
Uncle Scrooge And The Infinity Dime	2024	Uncle Scrooge And The Infinity Dime, plus bonus material	96	18 Mar 2025	J Scott Campbell DM cover: 978-1302964146

== Hulk ==
Title	Years covered	Material collected	Pages	Released	ISBN
Jeph Loeb & Tim Sale: Hulk	2003-2004	Hulk: Gray #1-6	168	26 Mar 2024	978-1302953072
Jeph Loeb & Tim Sale: Hulk	2003-2004	Hulk: Gray #1-6	168	26 Mar 2024	DM cover: 978-1302953089

== Marvel Events ==
Title	Years covered	Material collected	Pages	Released	ISBN
Contest Of Champions	1982	Marvel Super Hero Contest of Champions #1-3, West Coast Avengers Annual #2, Avengers Annual #16	168	19 Jul 2022	978-1302945039
Marvel Archive Edition: Secret Wars	1984-1985	Marvel Super Heroes Secret Wars #1-12 Facsimile Editions	512	16 Sep 2025	Mike Zeck Original First Issue cover: 978-1302965358
Marvel Archive Edition: Secret Wars	1984-1985	Marvel Super Heroes Secret Wars #1-12 Facsimile Editions	512	16 Sep 2025	Mike Zeck Original Collection cover: 978-1302965341
Marvel Archive Edition: Secret Wars	1984-1985	Marvel Super Heroes Secret Wars #1-12 Facsimile Editions	512	16 Sep 2025	Mike Zeck Hidden Gem cover: 978-1302965334

== Spider-Man ==
Title	Years covered	Material collected	Pages	Released	ISBN
Spider-Man: The Wedding Album	1987	Amazing Spider-Man (vol.1) #290-292, Amazing Spider-Man Annual #21, Spectacular Spider-Man Annual #7, What If? (1989) #20-21, Marvel Saga: The Official History Of The Marvel Universe #22 and material from Not Brand Echh #6	296	13 Dec 2022	John Romita Sr. cover: 978-1302946531
One More Day	2007	Amazing Spider-Man #544-545; Sensational Spider-Man #41; Friendly Neighborhood Spider-Man #24	136	18 Apr 2023	Joe Quesada cover: 978-1302949914
Marvel Archive Edition: The Black Costume – Year One	1984-1985	Amazing Spider-Man #252–263 Facsimile Editions	464	22 Jul 2025	Ron Frenz Original First cover: 978-1302965327
Marvel Archive Edition: The Black Costume – Year One	1984-1985	Amazing Spider-Man #252–263 Facsimile Editions	464	22 Jul 2025	Charles Vess Hidden Gem DM cover: 978-1302965303
Marvel Archive Edition: The Black Costume – Year One	1984-1985	Amazing Spider-Man #252–263 Facsimile Editions	464	22 Jul 2025	Ron Frenz Original Collection DM cover: 978-1302965310
Jeph Loeb & Tim Sale: Spider-Man	2002	Spider-Man: Blue (2002) #1-6	168	4 Jul 2023	Tim Sale Gwen Stacy cover: 978-1302951528
Jeph Loeb & Tim Sale: Spider-Man	2002	Spider-Man: Blue (2002) #1-6	168	4 Jul 2023	Tim Sale red-and-blue DM cover: 978-1302952396

== Thor ==
Title	Years covered	Material collected	Pages	Released	ISBN
Thor & Loki: Blood Brothers	2004-2008	Loki (2004) #1-4, Thor (2007) #12, material from Journey Into Mystery #85, #112	152	20 Aug 2019	978-1302918859

== X-23 ==
Title	Years covered	Material collected	Pages	Released	ISBN
NYX	2005-2009	NYX #1-7, NYX: No Way Home #1-6	392	24 Sep 2024	978-1302959067

== Venom ==
Title	Years covered	Material collected	Pages	Released	ISBN
Venom by Michelinie & McFarlane	1988-1989	Amazing Spider-Man #300, 315–317	128	4 May 2021	978-1302929534

== Warlock ==
Title	Years covered	Material collected	Pages	Released	ISBN
Warlock by Jim Starlin	1975-1976	Strange Tales #178-181, Warlock #9-15, Avengers Annual #7, Marvel Two-In-One Annual #2	360	22 Feb 2022	978-1302931780

== Wolverine ==
Title	Years covered	Material collected	Pages	Released	ISBN
Weapon X	1991	Marvel Comics Presents #72-84 and Wolverine #166, Uncanny X-Men #205	200	13 Apr 2022	978-1302933951
Wolverine/Gambit: Victims	1995	Wolverine/Gambit: Victims #1-4, material from Uncanny X-Men Annual #18	120	25 Mar 2025	978-1302962883
Wolverine/Gambit: Victims	1995	Wolverine/Gambit: Victims #1-4, material from Uncanny X-Men Annual #18	120	25 Mar 2025	Tim Sale DM cover: 978-1302962890

== X-Men ==
Title	Years covered	Material collected	Pages	Released	ISBN
X-Men by Roy Thomas & Neal Adams	1969-1970	X-Men #56-63, 65	208	24 Sep 2019	978-1302919368
God Loves, Man Kills: Extended Cut	1982	God Loves, Man Kills Extended Cut #1-2	112	15 Dec 2020	978-1302927318
Giant-Size X-Men: Tribute To Wein & Cockrum	1975	Giant-Size X-Men: Tribute To Wein & Cockrum, Giant-Size X-Men #1	200	28 Jul 2021	978-1302930332

== See also ==
- Marvel Omnibus
- Marvel oversized hardcovers
- Marvel Epic Collection
- Marvel Premier Collection
- Daredevil collected editions
- Spider-Man collected editions
- Marvel Complete Collections
- Marvel Masterworks
- Essential Marvel
