= David Marquez =

David Marquez may refer to:

- David Márquez (born 1977), Spanish racewalker
- David W. Márquez (born 1946), American politician
- David Marquez (comics), comic book artist

== See also ==
- David Marques (1932–2010), English rugby union player
- Marquez (disambiguation)
