= Marvel Omnibus =

Marvel Comics' hardcover reprint collection

A stack of Marvel omnibuses

Marvel Omnibus is a line of large format, high quality, full color, hardcover graphic novel omnibuses published by Marvel Comics. They often contain complete runs, either by collecting multiple consecutive issues, or by focusing on the works of a particular writer or artist.

The company's first experiment with a large hardcover was 2004's Ultimate Spider-Man Collection, which was exclusively published by Barnes & Noble. The 992-page book cost $49.99 and had the same contents as the first three oversized hardcovers from Brian Michael Bendis' Ultimate Spider-Man. This release did not use the 'omnibus' branding.

Marvel's first official omnibus came a year later, with Fantastic Four Vol. 1 in June 2005. With 848 pages, it collected the first 30 issues and an Annual of the comic. It cost $45 and debuted at no.58 in the graphic novel chart.

Senior vice president at Marvel, David Gabriel, told the New York Times the idea came from "trying to come up with a product tie-in for the Fantastic Four film to be released that summer — 'something to get the extreme collector excited'."

The book "sold out in a few weeks" and Kuo-Yu Liang, a vice president for Diamond Comic Distributors, said that trend for larger, more-expensive books: "reflects the demographics of the consumer, who is both older and more affluent."

After that success, four omnibuses followed in 2006: Alias (March), Uncanny X-Men Vol.1 (May), Eternals (July), and New X-Men (December). The line has seen enormous growth, with 12 omnibuses released in 2009; 19 in 2014; 33 in 2019; and 89 in 2024.

The creation of an omnibus allows Marvel to improve its overall process of releasing collected editions. Gabriel said: "[Material has] been allowed to go out of press, say Secret Wars, in order for us to create a special Omnibus Edition which also allows us to gather new extras, redo files that need fixing and get the best possible re-creation available for all the pages. This process in turn allows us to then put out a better version of the paperback and keep that one in stock."

== Format overlap ==
The omnibus launched three years after Marvel released its first oversized hardcover (or OHC). With the lines running side-by-side while sharing the same print size, there was often confusion in regards to how Marvel classified books. In 2015, a Spider-Verse 'oversized hardcover' was released at 648 pages; yet, months later, a Superior Foes of Spider-Man 'omnibus' came out, with only 376 pages. Both collected full runs of a Spider-Man miniseries that had been released within the prior two years. In February 2019, the Hulk: Dogs of War 'oversized hardcover' was 832 pages; while, four months later, Hulk by Loeb and McGuinness was a 912-page 'omnibus'.

The contents of an OHC and omnibus may be identical: The 2011 'oversized hardcover' of X-Men: Fall of the Mutants was re-released with the exact same page count and cover in 2022, while using 'omnibus' branding. Similarly, 2025's X-Men: Fatal Attractions 'omnibus' has the same content to the 2012 'oversized hardcover'.

The smallest omnibus was 2007's Devil Dinosaur at 184 pages, while the largest oversized hardcover was 2013's Avengers vs. X-Men Companion at 1,112 pages.

== Direct Market covers ==
The practice of having multiple covers for the same comic book has been a feature of the industry since the mid-1980s. This increased throughout the 1990s, with the five covers for 1991's X-Men #1 helping it to sell a record-breaking 8.1 million copies.

Marvel omnibuses have used variants since the first release of Fantastic Four Vol. 1 in 2005. The main 'bookshop' cover featured the original artwork from Fantastic Four #1, drawn by Jack Kirby; with a 'variant' version of the same image produced by Alex Ross. Variant covers are exclusive for the direct market, meaning they are only available from comic book shops, or specialist retailers.

The practice is polarising, being described as both "exciting options for readers who want a different flavor from what they're buying", but leading to comics companies avoiding "finding new readers... by selling more to existing ones".

The vast majority of Marvel omnibuses released between 2005 and September 2016 had a variant. The practice largely disappeared until early 2020, although, by 2021, every new Marvel omnibus again had more than one cover.

Marvel's Senior Vice President of Sales & Marketing, David Gabriel, said: "As long as no one is just taking advantage of customers and retailers, I think it [the production of variant covers] is going to continue to grow for a while."

== Marvel Universe omnibuses ==
These books contain stories that take place in the primary Marvel Universe. This fictional continuity is often referred to as Earth-616, with a legacy that stretches back to 1939.

=== Adam Warlock ===
Jim Starlin's interpretation of Adam Warlock was named by Publishers Weekly as one of Marvel's 10 hidden gems. The 1975 to 1977 portion of the Adam Warlock omnibus "is a heady, trippy sci-fi epic about what happens when a lab-created 'perfect man' discovers that the evil messiah of the cruel intergalactic church he's been battling is, in fact, his own future self." The omnibus also contains the introduction of infinity gems and Gamora.

#	Title	Years covered	Material collected	Pages	Released	ISBN
	Adam Warlock	1967-1980	Fantastic Four #66–67; Thor #165–166; Marvel Premiere #1–2; Warlock #1–15; Incredible Hulk #176–178, Annual #6; Strange Tales (1951) #178–181; Marvel Team-Up #55; Avengers Annual #7; Marvel Two-in-One #61–63, Annual #2	904	4 Apr 2023	Gil Kane cover: 978-1302949877
	Adam Warlock	1967-1980	Fantastic Four #66–67; Thor #165–166; Marvel Premiere #1–2; Warlock #1–15; Incredible Hulk #176–178, Annual #6; Strange Tales (1951) #178–181; Marvel Team-Up #55; Avengers Annual #7; Marvel Two-in-One #61–63, Annual #2	904	4 Apr 2023	Jim Starlin DM cover: 978-1302949884

=== Alpha Flight ===
The all-Canadian team of Alpha Flight was first introduced in Uncanny X-Men #120, by writer Chris Claremont and artist/co-plotter John Byrne. The debut led to the spin-off series, with Byrne writing and drawing the first 28 issues - all of which is collected in the Alpha Flight by John Byrne omnibus.

#	Title	Years covered	Material collected	Pages	Released	ISBN
	Alpha Flight by John Byrne	1977-1985	X-Men #109, 120–121, 139–140; Machine Man (1978) #18; Marvel Two-in-One #83-84; Incredible Hulk #272, 313, Annual #8; Alpha Flight #1–29; X-Men and Alpha Flight (1985) #1–2; X-Men/Alpha Flight (1998) #1–2; material from Marvel Team-Up Annual #7	1,248	14 Feb 2017	John Byrne cover: 978-1302904050
	Alpha Flight by John Byrne	1977-1985	X-Men #109, 120–121, 139–140; Machine Man (1978) #18; Marvel Two-in-One #83-84; Incredible Hulk #272, 313, Annual #8; Alpha Flight #1–29; X-Men and Alpha Flight (1985) #1–2; X-Men/Alpha Flight (1998) #1–2; material from Marvel Team-Up Annual #7	1,248	24 Oct 2023	John Byrne cover: 978-1302952716
	Alpha Flight by John Byrne	1977-1985	X-Men #109, 120–121, 139–140; Machine Man (1978) #18; Marvel Two-in-One #83-84; Incredible Hulk #272, 313, Annual #8; Alpha Flight #1–29; X-Men and Alpha Flight (1985) #1–2; X-Men/Alpha Flight (1998) #1–2; material from Marvel Team-Up Annual #7	1,248	24 Oct 2023	John Byrne original art DM cover: 978-1302952723
	Alpha Flight by Mantlo & Lee	1986-1989	Alpha Flight (1983) #30-70, Annual #1-2; Avengers #272; Marvel Fanfare (1982) #28	1,192	6 Jan 2026	Jim Lee cover: 978-1302965389
	Alpha Flight by Mantlo & Lee	1986-1989	Alpha Flight (1983) #30-70, Annual #1-2; Avengers #272; Marvel Fanfare (1982) #28	1,192	6 Jan 2026	Mike Mignola cover: 978-1302965396

=== Avengers ===
#	Title	Years covered	Material collected	Legacy	Pages	Released	ISBN
1	The Avengers Vol. 1	1963-1966	Avengers #1–30	#1-30	744	15 Feb 2012	John Romita Jr. cover: 978-0785158462
1	The Avengers Vol. 1	1963-1966	Avengers #1–30	#1-30	744	15 Feb 2012	Jack Kirby DM cover: 978-0785160151
1	The Avengers Vol. 1	1963-1966	Avengers #1–30	#1-30	776	19 Jul 2023	John Romita Jr. cover: 978-1302953546
1	The Avengers Vol. 1	1963-1966	Avengers #1–30	#1-30	776	19 Jul 2023	Jack Kirby DM cover: 978-1302953553
2	The Avengers Vol. 2	1966-1968	Avengers #31–58, Annual #1–2; X-Men #45; material from Not Brand Echh #5, 8	#31-58	832	18 Mar 2015	Alex Ross cover: 978-0785191766
2	The Avengers Vol. 2	1966-1968	Avengers #31–58, Annual #1–2; X-Men #45; material from Not Brand Echh #5, 8	#31-58	832	18 Mar 2015	John Buscema DM cover: 978-0785191773
2	The Avengers Vol. 2	1966-1968	Avengers #31–58, Annual #1–2; X-Men #45; material from Not Brand Echh #5, 8	#31-58	848	25 Jul 2023	Alex Ross cover: 978-1302953560
2	The Avengers Vol. 2	1966-1968	Avengers #31–58, Annual #1–2; X-Men #45; material from Not Brand Echh #5, 8	#31-58	848	25 Jul 2023	John Buscema DM cover: 978-1302953577
3	The Avengers Vol. 3	1968-1971	Avengers #59–88; The Incredible Hulk (vol. 2) #140; Marvel Super-Heroes #17	#59-88	760	21 Mar 2018	Alan Davis cover: 978-1302910204
3	The Avengers Vol. 3	1968-1971	Avengers #59–88; The Incredible Hulk (vol. 2) #140; Marvel Super-Heroes #17	#59-88	760	21 Mar 2018	John Buscema DM cover: 978-1302910211
3	The Avengers Vol. 3	1968-1971	Avengers #59–88; The Incredible Hulk (vol. 2) #140; Marvel Super-Heroes #17	#59-88	768	29 Aug 2023	Alan Davis cover: 978-1302953607
3	The Avengers Vol. 3	1968-1971	Avengers #59–88; The Incredible Hulk (vol. 2) #140; Marvel Super-Heroes #17	#59-88	768	29 Aug 2023	John Buscema DM cover: 978-1302953614
4	The Avengers Vol. 4	1971-1973	Avengers #89–119; Daredevil #99; Defenders #8–11	#89-119	856	20 Mar 2019	Arthur Adams cover: 978-1302915346
4	The Avengers Vol. 4	1971-1973	Avengers #89–119; Daredevil #99; Defenders #8–11	#89-119	856	20 Mar 2019	Neal Adams DM cover: 978-1302915353
4	The Avengers Vol. 4	1971-1973	Avengers #89–119; Daredevil #99; Defenders #8–11	#89-119	856	19 Sep 2023	Arthur Adams cover: 978-1302953621
4	The Avengers Vol. 4	1971-1973	Avengers #89–119; Daredevil #99; Defenders #8–11	#89-119	856	19 Sep 2023	Neal Adams DM cover: 978-1302953638
5	The Avengers Vol. 5	1973-1976	Avengers #120–149; Giant-Size Avengers #1–4; Captain Marvel #33; Fantastic Four #150; material from FOOM #6–7, 12	#120-149	856	26 Sep 2023	Gil Kane cover: 978-1302954116
5	The Avengers Vol. 5	1973-1976	Avengers #120–149; Giant-Size Avengers #1–4; Captain Marvel #33; Fantastic Four #150; material from FOOM #6–7, 12	#120-149	856	26 Sep 2023	Rich Buckler DM cover: 978-1302954123
6	The Avengers Vol. 6	1976-1979	Avengers #150–188, Annual #6-9; Super-Villain Team-Up #9; Marvel Two-In-One Annual #2; Marvel Premiere #35-37, 49; What If...? #3, 9; material from Marvel Tales #100; Marvel Treasury Edition #13	#150-188	1,176	24 Mar 2026	George Perez cover: 978-1302968267
6	The Avengers Vol. 6	1976-1979	Avengers #150–188, Annual #6-9; Super-Villain Team-Up #9; Marvel Two-In-One Annual #2; Marvel Premiere #35-37, 49; What If...? #3, 9; material from Marvel Tales #100; Marvel Treasury Edition #13	#150-188	1,176	24 Mar 2026	Jack Kirby DM cover: 978-1302968274
	Avengers: The Gathering	1991-1996	Avengers #343–344, 348–375, Annual #22; Avengers Strikefile; X-Men (1991) #26; Avengers West Coast #101; Uncanny X-Men #307; Black Knight: Exodus; Avengers Anniversary Magazine	#343-375	1,152	17 Mar 2021	Steve Epting Magdalene cover: 978-1302926496
	Avengers: The Gathering	1991-1996	Avengers #343–344, 348–375, Annual #22; Avengers Strikefile; X-Men (1991) #26; Avengers West Coast #101; Uncanny X-Men #307; Black Knight: Exodus; Avengers Anniversary Magazine	#343-375	1,152	17 Mar 2021	Steve Epting Captain America DM cover: 978-1302926502
	Avengers: The Crossing	1995-1996	Avengers #390–395; Avengers: The Crossing; Avengers: Timeslide; Iron Man #319–325; Force Works #16–22; War Machine #20–25; Age of Innocence: The Rebirth of Iron Man	#390-395	792	9 May 2012	Patrick Scherberger cover: 978-0785162032
	Avengers: The Crossing	1995-1996	Avengers #390–395; Avengers: The Crossing; Avengers: Timeslide; Iron Man #319–325; Force Works #16–22; War Machine #20–25; Age of Innocence: The Rebirth of Iron Man	#390-395	792	9 May 2012	Mike Deodato Jr. DM cover: 978-0785162049
1	Avengers by Kurt Busiek and George Pérez Vol. 1	1997-1999	Avengers (vol. 3) #1–23, 0, Rough Cut, Annual '99; Iron Man (vol. 3) #7; Captain America (vol. 3) #8; Quicksilver #10; Avengers/Squadron Supreme Annual 1998; Avengers Forever #1–12	#416-438	1,184	18 Mar 2015	George Pérez cover: 978-0785192886
1	Avengers by Kurt Busiek and George Pérez Vol. 1	1997-1999	Avengers (vol. 3) #1–23, 0, Rough Cut, Annual '99; Iron Man (vol. 3) #7; Captain America (vol. 3) #8; Quicksilver #10; Avengers/Squadron Supreme Annual 1998; Avengers Forever #1–12	#416-438	1,184	3 Jan 2023	George Pérez cover: 978-1302945459
1	Avengers by Kurt Busiek and George Pérez Vol. 1	1997-1999	Avengers (vol. 3) #1–23, 0, Rough Cut, Annual '99; Iron Man (vol. 3) #7; Captain America (vol. 3) #8; Quicksilver #10; Avengers/Squadron Supreme Annual 1998; Avengers Forever #1–12	#416-438	1,184	3 Jan 2023	George Pérez circle DM cover: 978-1302945466
2	Avengers by Kurt Busiek and George Pérez Vol. 2	1999-2002	Avengers (vol. 3) #24–56, 1½, Annual 2000, Annual 2001; Thunderbolts #42–44; Avengers: The Ultron Imperative; Maximum Security #1–3; Maximum Security: Dangerous Planet	#439-471	1,248	3 Nov 2015	George Perez cover: 978-0785198079
2	Avengers by Kurt Busiek and George Pérez Vol. 2	1999-2002	Avengers (vol. 3) #24–56, 1½, Annual 2000, Annual 2001; Thunderbolts #42–44; Avengers: The Ultron Imperative; Maximum Security #1–3; Maximum Security: Dangerous Planet	#439-471	1,248	10 Sep 2024	George Perez 25th Issue cover: 978-1302959012
2	Avengers by Kurt Busiek and George Pérez Vol. 2	1999-2002	Avengers (vol. 3) #24–56, 1½, Annual 2000, Annual 2001; Thunderbolts #42–44; Avengers: The Ultron Imperative; Maximum Security #1–3; Maximum Security: Dangerous Planet	#439-471	1,248	10 Sep 2024	Alan Davis Time Lost DM cover: 978-1302959029
2	Avengers by Kurt Busiek and George Pérez Vol. 2	1999-2002	Avengers (vol. 3) #24–56, 1½, Annual 2000, Annual 2001; Thunderbolts #42–44; Avengers: The Ultron Imperative; Maximum Security #1–3; Maximum Security: Dangerous Planet	#439-471	1,248	10 Sep 2024	Alan Davis DM cover: 978-1302959715
	Avengers by Johns & Coipel	2002-2004	Avengers (vol. 3) #57-84; Avengers Icons: The Vision #1-4; Thor (vol. 2) #58; Iron Man (vol. 3) #64; New Invaders 0	#472-499	824	23 Dec 2025	David Finch cover: 978-1302906887
	Avengers by Johns & Coipel	2002-2004	Avengers (vol. 3) #57-84; Avengers Icons: The Vision #1-4; Thor (vol. 2) #58; Iron Man (vol. 3) #64; New Invaders 0	#472-499	824	23 Dec 2025	Jim Cheung DM cover: 978-1302966447
1	New Avengers Vol. 1	2004-2007	Avengers #500–503; Avengers Finale; New Avengers #1–31, Annual #1; New Avengers and the Fantastic Four #1; Giant-Size Spider-Woman #1; New Avengers: Illuminati; Civil War: The Confession; Civil War: The Initiative; New Avengers: Most Wanted Files	#500-534	1,208	29 Sep 2012	David Finch cover: 978-0785164890
1	New Avengers Vol. 1	2004-2007	Avengers #500–503; Avengers Finale; New Avengers #1–31, Annual #1; New Avengers and the Fantastic Four #1; Giant-Size Spider-Woman #1; New Avengers: Illuminati; Civil War: The Confession; Civil War: The Initiative; New Avengers: Most Wanted Files	#500-534	1,208	29 Sep 2012	Joe Quesada DM cover: 978-0785165750
1	New Avengers Vol. 1	2004-2007	Avengers #500–503; Avengers Finale; New Avengers #1–31, Annual #1; New Avengers and the Fantastic Four #1; Giant-Size Spider-Woman #1; New Avengers: Illuminati; Civil War: The Confession; Civil War: The Initiative; New Avengers: Most Wanted Files	#500-534	1,208	7 Jan 2025	David Finch cover: 978-1302959142
1	New Avengers Vol. 1	2004-2007	Avengers #500–503; Avengers Finale; New Avengers #1–31, Annual #1; New Avengers and the Fantastic Four #1; Giant-Size Spider-Woman #1; New Avengers: Illuminati; Civil War: The Confession; Civil War: The Initiative; New Avengers: Most Wanted Files	#500-534	1,208	7 Jan 2025	Joe Quesada DM cover: 978-1302959159
2	New Avengers Vol. 2	2007-2010	New Avengers #32-64, Annual #2-3; New Avengers Illuminati #1-5; Secret Invasion: Dark Reign; FCBD 2009: Avengers; Dark Reign: The List; New Avengers: Finale; material from Amazing Spider-Man #601; Breaking Into Comics the Marvel Way	#535-567	1,224	4 Nov 2025	Billy Tan cover: 978-1302965853
2	New Avengers Vol. 2	2007-2010	New Avengers #32-64, Annual #2-3; New Avengers Illuminati #1-5; Secret Invasion: Dark Reign; FCBD 2009: Avengers; Dark Reign: The List; New Avengers: Finale; material from Amazing Spider-Man #601; Breaking Into Comics the Marvel Way	#535-567	1,224	4 Nov 2025	Jim Cheung DM cover: 978-1302965860
3	New Avengers Vol. 3	2010-2013	New Avengers (vol. 2) #1-34, #16.1; Avengers (vol. 4) #1–12 (B-stories)		1,016	17 Nov 2026	Stuart Immonen cover: 978-1302969752
3	New Avengers Vol. 3	2010-2013	New Avengers (vol. 2) #1-34, #16.1; Avengers (vol. 4) #1–12 (B-stories)		1,016	17 Nov 2026	David Yardin DM cover: 978-1302969745
Jump to: Avengers vs. X-Men
1	Avengers by Jonathan Hickman Vol. 1	2012-2013	Avengers (vol. 5) #1–23; New Avengers (vol. 3) #1–12; Infinity #1–6; Infinity: Against the Tide; Infinite Comic #1–2; material from Astonishing Tales (vol. 2) #1–6 and Shang-Chi: Master of Kung Fu (vol. 2) #1	#602-624	1,192	5 Jul 2017	Dustin Weaver cover: 978-1302907082
1	Avengers by Jonathan Hickman Vol. 1	2012-2013	Avengers (vol. 5) #1–23; New Avengers (vol. 3) #1–12; Infinity #1–6; Infinity: Against the Tide; Infinite Comic #1–2; material from Astonishing Tales (vol. 2) #1–6 and Shang-Chi: Master of Kung Fu (vol. 2) #1	#602-624	1,192	7 Feb 2023	Dustin Weaver cover: 978-1302945473
1	Avengers by Jonathan Hickman Vol. 1	2012-2013	Avengers (vol. 5) #1–23; New Avengers (vol. 3) #1–12; Infinity #1–6; Infinity: Against the Tide; Infinite Comic #1–2; material from Astonishing Tales (vol. 2) #1–6 and Shang-Chi: Master of Kung Fu (vol. 2) #1	#602-624	1,192	7 Feb 2023	Art Adams DM cover: 978-1302945480
2	Avengers by Jonathan Hickman Vol. 2	2013-2015	Avengers (vol. 5) #24–44; New Avengers (vol. 3) #13–33	#625-645	1,088	4 Jul 2018	Esad Ribić cover: 978-1302911812
2	Avengers by Jonathan Hickman Vol. 2	2013-2015	Avengers (vol. 5) #24–44; New Avengers (vol. 3) #13–33	#625-645	1,088	9 May 2023	Esad Ribić cover: 978-1302945497
2	Avengers by Jonathan Hickman Vol. 2	2013-2015	Avengers (vol. 5) #24–44; New Avengers (vol. 3) #13–33	#625-645	1,088	9 May 2023	Dale Keown DM cover: 978-1302945503
Jump to: Secret Wars (2015)
	Uncanny Avengers	2012-2014	Uncanny Avengers #1–25, 8AU, Annual #1		672	17 Feb 2015	978-0785193944
	Uncanny Avengers	2012-2014	Uncanny Avengers #1–25, 8AU, Annual #1		672	17 Feb 2015	DM cover: 978-0785197881
	Avengers: No Surrender/No Road Home	2018-2019	Avengers #675-679, 680 (A-story), 681–690; Quicksilver: No Surrender #1-5; Avengers No Road Home #1-10	#675-690	776	10 Mar 2026	Mark Brooks cover: 978-1302966539
	Avengers: No Surrender/No Road Home	2018-2019	Avengers #675-679, 680 (A-story), 681–690; Quicksilver: No Surrender #1-5; Avengers No Road Home #1-10	#675-690	776	10 Mar 2026	Yasmine Putri DM cover: 978-1302966546
1	Avengers by Jason Aaron Vol. 1	2018-2021	Avengers (2018) #1–45; FCBD 2018: Avengers/Captain America (Avengers story); FCBD 2019: Avengers/Savage Avengers (Avengers story)	#691-745	TBC	Mar 2027	Ed McGuinness cover: TBC
1	Avengers by Jason Aaron Vol. 1	2018-2021	Avengers (2018) #1–45; FCBD 2018: Avengers/Captain America (Avengers story); FCBD 2019: Avengers/Savage Avengers (Avengers story)	#691-745	TBC	Mar 2027	Sara Pichelli DM cover: TBC
	Avengers Forever by Jason Aaron	2021-2023	Avengers Forever (2021) #1–15; Avengers Forever Infinity Comic (2022) #1–4; Avengers Assemble Alpha; Avengers (vol. 8) #63–66, Avengers Assemble Omega (2023)	#763-766	592	4 Mar 2025	Aaron Kuder cover: 978-1302961121
	Avengers Forever by Jason Aaron	2021-2023	Avengers Forever (2021) #1–15; Avengers Forever Infinity Comic (2022) #1–4; Avengers Assemble Alpha; Avengers (vol. 8) #63–66, Avengers Assemble Omega (2023)	#763-766	592	4 Mar 2025	Phil Jimenez DM cover: 978-1302961138
Jump to: Ultimates omnibuses

==== Savage Avengers ====
#	Title	Years covered	Material collected	Legacy	Pages	Released	ISBN
	Savage Avengers by Gerry Duggan	1986, 2019-2022	Savage Avengers (2019) #0–28, Annual #1; Uncanny X-Men (1981) #190–191; FCBD 2019: Avengers/Savage Avengers (Savage Avengers story)	#0-28	776	21 Mar 2023	David Finch cover: 978-1302947842
	Savage Avengers by Gerry Duggan	1986, 2019-2022	Savage Avengers (2019) #0–28, Annual #1; Uncanny X-Men (1981) #190–191; FCBD 2019: Avengers/Savage Avengers (Savage Avengers story)	#0-28	776	21 Mar 2023	Mike Deodato Jr. DM cover: 978-1302947859
Jump to: Conan omnibuses

=== Avengers: West Coast Avengers ===
#	Title	Years covered	Material collected	Legacy	Pages	Released	ISBN
1	Avengers: West Coast Avengers Vol. 1	1984-1987	West Coast Avengers (1984) #1–4; Iron Man Annual #7; Avengers #250, Annual #15; West Coast Avengers (1985) #1–16, Annual #1; The Vision and the Scarlet Witch (vol. 2) #1–2; material from Avengers #239, 243–244, 246; Avengers West Coast #100	#1-16	760	3 Apr 2013	Greg Land cover: 978-0785167457
1	Avengers: West Coast Avengers Vol. 1	1984-1987	West Coast Avengers (1984) #1–4; Iron Man Annual #7; Avengers #250, Annual #15; West Coast Avengers (1985) #1–16, Annual #1; The Vision and the Scarlet Witch (vol. 2) #1–2; material from Avengers #239, 243–244, 246; Avengers West Coast #100	#1-16	760	3 Apr 2013	Al Milgrom DM cover: 978-0785167464
2	Avengers: West Coast Avengers Vol. 2	1987-1989	West Coast Avengers (1985) #17–41, Annual #2–3; Avengers Annual #16; material from Fantastic Four #19 and Doctor Strange (vol. 2) #53	#17-41	768	6 Nov 2013	Carlos Pacheco cover: 978-0785167471
2	Avengers: West Coast Avengers Vol. 2	1987-1989	West Coast Avengers (1985) #17–41, Annual #2–3; Avengers Annual #16; material from Fantastic Four #19 and Doctor Strange (vol. 2) #53	#17-41	768	6 Nov 2013	Al Milgrom DM cover: 978-0785167488
	Avengers by John Byrne	1989-1990	West Coast Avengers (1985) #42–46; Avengers West Coast (1989) #47–62, Annual #4; Avengers #305–318, Annual #18	#42-62	992	6 Jul 2016	John Byrne cover: 978-1302900571

=== Black Cat ===
Jed MacKay's Black Cat omnibus contains the complete series. The story spun out of Amazing Spider-Man (vol. 5) #16, where the character crossed the Thieves Guild, "leading her to go on the run both from the secret order as well as the authorities."

That issue is collected in Amazing Spider-Man by Nick Spencer Omnibus Vol. 1.

#	Title	Years covered	Material collected	Legacy	Pages	Released	ISBN
	Black Cat by Jed MacKay	2019-2022	Black Cat (2019) #1–12, Annual #1; Black Cat (2020) #1–10, Annual #1 (A-story); Giant-Size Black Cat: Infinity Score #1; Iron Cat #1–5; FCBD 2020 (Spider-Man/Venom)	#1-22	784	18 Jul 2023	Pepe Larraz cover: 978-1302952013
	Black Cat by Jed MacKay	2019-2022	Black Cat (2019) #1–12, Annual #1; Black Cat (2020) #1–10, Annual #1 (A-story); Giant-Size Black Cat: Infinity Score #1; Iron Cat #1–5; FCBD 2020 (Spider-Man/Venom)	#1-22	784	18 Jul 2023	Inhyuk Lee DM cover: 978-1302952020

=== Black Panther ===
#	Title	Years covered	Material collected	Legacy	Pages	Released	ISBN
	Black Panther: The Early Years	1966-1976	Fantastic Four #52–53, 56, 119 and material from 54; Tales of Suspense #97–99; Captain America #100; Avengers #52, 62, 73–74, 77–79, 87, 112, 126; Daredevil #52, 69, Annual #4; Astonishing Tales #6–7; Marvel Team-Up #20; Jungle Action (vol. 2) #6–24		912	11 Oct 2022	Esad Ribić cover: 978-1302945084
	Black Panther: The Early Years	1966-1976	Fantastic Four #52–53, 56, 119 and material from 54; Tales of Suspense #97–99; Captain America #100; Avengers #52, 62, 73–74, 77–79, 87, 112, 126; Daredevil #52, 69, Annual #4; Astonishing Tales #6–7; Marvel Team-Up #20; Jungle Action (vol. 2) #6–24		912	11 Oct 2022	Rich Buckler DM cover: 978-1302945091
	Black Panther: Panther's Prey	1977-1996	Black Panther (1977) #1-15; Marvel Two-in-One #40-41; Marvel Team-Up (1972) #87; Marvel Premiere #51-53; The Defenders #84-86; The Invincible Iron Man Annual #5; Black Panther (1988) #1-4; Black Panther: Panther's Prey (1991) #1-4; Over the Edge #6 and material from Marvel Team-Up (1972) #100; Marvel Comics Presents (1988) #13-37 and 148; What The--?! #9; Solo Avengers (1987) #19, Marvel Super-Heroes (1990) #1, Marvel Fanfare (1982) #60, and Fantastic Four Unlimited #1	#1-15	1,272	3 Feb 2026	Denys Cowan cover: 978-1302967659
	Black Panther: Panther's Prey	1977-1996	Black Panther (1977) #1-15; Marvel Two-in-One #40-41; Marvel Team-Up (1972) #87; Marvel Premiere #51-53; The Defenders #84-86; The Invincible Iron Man Annual #5; Black Panther (1988) #1-4; Black Panther: Panther's Prey (1991) #1-4; Over the Edge #6 and material from Marvel Team-Up (1972) #100; Marvel Comics Presents (1988) #13-37 and 148; What The--?! #9; Solo Avengers (1987) #19, Marvel Super-Heroes (1990) #1, Marvel Fanfare (1982) #60, and Fantastic Four Unlimited #1	#1-15	1,272	3 Feb 2026	Jack Kirby DM cover: 978-1302967666
1	Black Panther by Christopher Priest Vol. 1	1998-2002	Black Panther (vol. 3) #1–33; Deadpool (1997) #44; material from Marvel Double-Shot #2	#16-48	840	7 Dec 2022	Mark Texeira cover: 978-1302945015
1	Black Panther by Christopher Priest Vol. 1	1998-2002	Black Panther (vol. 3) #1–33; Deadpool (1997) #44; material from Marvel Double-Shot #2	#16-48	840	7 Dec 2022	Sal Velluto DM cover: 978-1302945022
2	Black Panther by Christopher Priest Vol. 2	2001-2003	Black Panther (1998) #34–62; Incredible Hulk (2000) #33; The Crew #1–7; Thor #370	#49-77	928	21 Feb 2024	Liam Sharp cover: 978-1302953683
2	Black Panther by Christopher Priest Vol. 2	2001-2003	Black Panther (1998) #34–62; Incredible Hulk (2000) #33; The Crew #1–7; Thor #370	#49-77	928	21 Feb 2024	Sal Velluto DM cover: 978-1302953690
	Black Panther by Reginald Hudlin	2005-2010	Black Panther (vol. 4) #1–41, X-Men (1991) #175–176; Black Panther Annual #1 (2008); Black Panther (vol. 5) #1–6; Captain America/Black Panther: Flags of Our Fathers (2010) #1–4, Black Panther Saga (2008)	#78-124	1,368	18 Feb 2025	John Romita Jr. cover: 978-1302963484
	Black Panther by Reginald Hudlin	2005-2010	Black Panther (vol. 4) #1–41, X-Men (1991) #175–176; Black Panther Annual #1 (2008); Black Panther (vol. 5) #1–6; Captain America/Black Panther: Flags of Our Fathers (2010) #1–4, Black Panther Saga (2008)	#78-124	1,368	18 Feb 2025	Alan Davis DM cover: 978-1302963491
	Black Panther by Ta-Nehisi Coates	2016-2021	Black Panther (vol. 6) #1–18, 166-169, 170 (A-story), 171–172; Black Panther (vol. 7) #1–22, 23–25 (A-stories)	#148-197	1,224	11 Oct 2022	Brian Stelfreeze cover: 978-1302945695
	Black Panther by Ta-Nehisi Coates	2016-2021	Black Panther (vol. 6) #1–18, 166-169, 170 (A-story), 171–172; Black Panther (vol. 7) #1–22, 23–25 (A-stories)	#148-197	1,224	11 Oct 2022	Michael Cho DM cover: 978-1302945701
	Wakanda: World of Black Panther	2016-2021	Rise of the Black Panther #1–6; Black Panther: World of Wakanda #1–6; Black Panther & the Crew #1–6; Black Panther: Long Live the King #1–6; Black Panther Annual (2018); Amazing Spider-Man: Wakanda Forever #1; X-Men: Wakanda Forever #1; Avengers: Wakanda Forever #1; Black Panther vs. Deadpool #1–5; Shuri #1–10; Killmonger #1–5; Black Panther and the Agents of Wakanda #1–8; King in Black: Black Panther; The Last Annihilation: Wakanda; material from Venomverse: War Stories #1; Marvel Comics (2019) #1000; Marvel's Voices #1; Marvel's Voices: Legacy #1; Black Panther (vol. 7) #23–25 (B-stories)		1,376	4 Oct 2022	Sanford Greene cover: 978-1302946272
	Wakanda: World of Black Panther	2016-2021			1,376	4 Oct 2022	Phil Jiminez DM cover: 978-1302946289

=== Black Widow ===
#	Title	Years covered	Material collected	Legacy	Pages	Released	ISBN
	Black Widow Strikes	1964-1998	Tales of Suspense #52–53, 57, 60, 64; Avengers #29–30, 36–37, 43–44; Amazing Spider-Man #86; Amazing Adventures (vol. 2) #1–8; Daredevil #81, Annual #10; Bizarre Adventures #25; Marvel Fanfare #10–13; Solo Avengers #7; Marvel Graphic Novel No. 61 – The Black Widow: The Coldest War, No. 74 – Punisher/Black Widow: Spinning Doomsday's Web and No. 75 – Daredevil/Black Widow: Abattoir; Marvel Comics Presents #135; Fury/Black Widow: Death Duty; Journey into Mystery #517–519; material from Avengers #16, 32–33, 38–39, 41–42, 45–47, 57, 63–64, 76		896	25 Mar 2020	John Tyler Christopher cover: 978-1302921279
	Black Widow Strikes	1964-1998			896	25 Mar 2020	George Perez DM cover: 978-1302921286
	Black Widow & Captain America by Waid & Samnee	2016-2018	Black Widow (vol. 6) #1-12; Captain America #695-696, 697 (A-story), 698–704	#29-40	536	24 Mar 2026	Chris Samnee Black Widow cover: 978-1302966577
	Black Widow & Captain America by Waid & Samnee	2016-2018	Black Widow (vol. 6) #1-12; Captain America #695-696, 697 (A-story), 698–704	#29-40	536	24 Mar 2026	Chris Samnee Captain America DM cover: 978-1302966584

=== Blade the Vampire-Slayer ===
#	Title	Years covered	Material collected	Pages	Released	ISBN
	Blade: The Early Years	1973-1991	The Tomb of Dracula (1972) #10, 12–14, 24, 30, 41–43, 45, 51, 53, 58; Marvel Preview (1975) #3; Fear #24; Doctor Strange #61–62, 67; Tomb of Dracula (1991) #1-4; material from The Tomb of Dracula (1972) #17–19, 21, 44, 46–50, 52, Vampire Tales #8–9, Marvel Preview (1975) #8 and Marvel Comics Presents #64	720	15 Nov 2023	Dave Wilkins Cover: 978-1302950231
	Blade: The Early Years	1973-1991	The Tomb of Dracula (1972) #10, 12–14, 24, 30, 41–43, 45, 51, 53, 58; Marvel Preview (1975) #3; Fear #24; Doctor Strange #61–62, 67; Tomb of Dracula (1991) #1-4; material from The Tomb of Dracula (1972) #17–19, 21, 44, 46–50, 52, Vampire Tales #8–9, Marvel Preview (1975) #8 and Marvel Comics Presents #64	720	15 Nov 2023	Gray Morrow DM cover: 978-1302950248
	Blade: The Early Years	1973-1991	The Tomb of Dracula (1972) #10, 12–14, 24, 30, 41–43, 45, 51, 53, 58; Marvel Preview (1975) #3; Fear #24; Doctor Strange #61–62, 67; Tomb of Dracula (1991) #1-4; material from The Tomb of Dracula (1972) #17–19, 21, 44, 46–50, 52, Vampire Tales #8–9, Marvel Preview (1975) #8 and Marvel Comics Presents #64	720	15 Nov 2023	Gil Kane DM cover: 978-1302952440

=== Captain America ===
#	Title	Years covered	Material collected	Legacy	Pages	Released	ISBN
1	Golden Age Captain America Vol. 1	1940-1942	Captain America Comics #1–12		848	19 Feb 2014	Lee Weeks cover: 978-0785168072
1	Golden Age Captain America Vol. 1	1940-1942	Captain America Comics #1–12		848	19 Feb 2014	Alex Schomburg DM cover: 978-0785168089
1	Golden Age Captain America Vol. 1	1940-1942	Captain America Comics #1–12		848	10 Mar 2021	Lee Weeks cover: 978-1302926694
1	Golden Age Captain America Vol. 1	1940-1942	Captain America Comics #1–12		848	10 Mar 2021	Alex Schomburg DM cover: 978-1302926700
2	Golden Age Captain America Vol. 2	1942-1943	Captain America Comics #13–24		832	4 Aug 2021	Paolo Rivera cover: 978-1302926717
2	Golden Age Captain America Vol. 2	1942-1943	Captain America Comics #13–24		832	4 Aug 2021	Al Avison DM cover: 978-1302926724
Captain America legacy numbering starts at #58, and that number can be found in The Invincible Iron Man Vol. 1
1	Captain America Vol. 1	1964-1969	Tales of Suspense #59–99; Captain America #100–113; material from Not Brand Echh #3	#59-113	856	11 May 2011	Ron Garney cover: 978-0785150787
1	Captain America Vol. 1	1964-1969	Tales of Suspense #59–99; Captain America #100–113; material from Not Brand Echh #3	#59-113	856	11 May 2011	Jack Kirby DM cover: 978-0785152972
1	Captain America Vol. 1	1964-1969	Tales of Suspense #59–99; Captain America #100–113; material from Not Brand Echh #3	#59-113	856	27 Apr 2016	Ron Garney cover: 978-1302901615
1	Captain America Vol. 1	1964-1969	Tales of Suspense #59–99; Captain America #100–113; material from Not Brand Echh #3	#59-113	856	30 Apr 2024	Ron Garney cover: 978-1302957995
1	Captain America Vol. 1	1964-1969	Tales of Suspense #59–99; Captain America #100–113; material from Not Brand Echh #3	#59-113	856	30 Apr 2024	Jack Kirby DM cover: 978-1302958008
2	Captain America Vol. 2	1969-1972	Captain America #114–148	#114-148	824	16 Mar 2016	Carlos Pacheco cover: 978-0785199274
2	Captain America Vol. 2	1969-1972	Captain America #114–148	#114-148	824	16 Mar 2016	John Romita Sr. DM cover: 978-0785199281
2	Captain America Vol. 2	1969-1972	Captain America #114–148	#114-148	824	1 Oct 2024	Carlos Pacheco cover: 978-1302958398
2	Captain America Vol. 2	1969-1972	Captain America #114–148	#114-148	824	1 Oct 2024	John Romita Sr. DM cover: 978-1302958404
3	Captain America Vol. 3	1972-1975	Captain America #149–192	#149-192	976	28 Jul 2021	Iban Coello cover: 978-1302930424
3	Captain America Vol. 3	1972-1975	Captain America #149–192	#149-192	976	28 Jul 2021	Sal Buscema DM cover: 978-1302930431
3	Captain America Vol. 3	1972-1975	Captain America #149–192	#149-192	976	3 Dec 2024	Iban Coello cover: 978-1302958411
3	Captain America Vol. 3	1972-1975	Captain America #149–192	#149-192	976	3 Dec 2024	Sal Buscema DM cover: 978-1302958428
4	Captain America Vol. 4	1975-1977	Captain America #193–214, Annual #3–4; Marvel Treasury Special: Captain America's Bicentennial Battles; material from F.O.O.M. #11	#193-214	656	26 Mar 2024	Jack Kirby Explosion cover: 978-1302955137
4	Captain America Vol. 4	1975-1977	Captain America #193–214, Annual #3–4; Marvel Treasury Special: Captain America's Bicentennial Battles; material from F.O.O.M. #11	#193-214	656	26 Mar 2024	Jack Kirby Kill Derby DM cover: 978-1302955144
4 (Alt)	Captain America by Jack Kirby	1975-1977	Captain America #193–214, Annual #3–4; Captain America's Bicentennial Battles	#193-214	568	16 Feb 2011	Jack Kirby cover: 978-0785149606
4 (Alt)	Captain America by Jack Kirby	1975-1977	Added material from F.O.O.M (1973) #11	#193-214	648	9 Mar 2021	Jack Kirby Madbomb cover: 978-1302928216
4 (Alt)	Captain America by Jack Kirby	1975-1977	Added material from F.O.O.M (1973) #11	#193-214	648	9 Mar 2021	Jack Kirby Falcon DM cover: 978-1302928223
5	Captain America Vol. 5	1977-1981	Captain America #215–260; Incredible Hulk #232; Marvel Premiere #49; material from What If...? #5 & #26	#215-260	1,048	21 Jul 2026	Frank Robbins Shield Toss cover: 978-1302968229
5	Captain America Vol. 5	1977-1981	Captain America #215–260; Incredible Hulk #232; Marvel Premiere #49; material from What If...? #5 & #26	#215-260	1,048	21 Jul 2026	Frank Miller Golden Age Throwback DM cover: 978-1302968236
1	Captain America by Mark Gruenwald Vol. 1	1985-1989	Captain America #307–350, Annual #8; Marvel Fanfare #29; Amazing Spider-Man #278; Iron Man #228; material from Marvel Fanfare #26, 31–32	#307-350	1,336	4 Jun 2024	Mike Zeck Wolverine cover: 978-1302956875
1	Captain America by Mark Gruenwald Vol. 1	1985-1989	Captain America #307–350, Annual #8; Marvel Fanfare #29; Amazing Spider-Man #278; Iron Man #228; material from Marvel Fanfare #26, 31–32	#307-350	1,336	4 Jun 2024	Mike Zeck D-Man, Falcon & Nomad DM cover: 978-1302956882
2	Captain America by Mark Gruenwald Vol. 2	1989-1991	Captain America #351–386, Annual #9–10; Adventures of Captain America #1–4; material from Daredevil Annual #7; Punisher Annual #4	#351-386	1,288	1 Jul 2025	Ron Lim Anniversary cover: 978-1302964214
2	Captain America by Mark Gruenwald Vol. 2	1989-1991	Captain America #351–386, Annual #9–10; Adventures of Captain America #1–4; material from Daredevil Annual #7; Punisher Annual #4	#351-386	1,288	1 Jul 2025	Ron Lim Serpent Society DM cover: 978-1302964221
3	Captain America by Mark Gruenwald Vol. 3	1991-1993	Captain America #387–418, Annual #11; Punisher/Captain America: Blood & Glory #1–3; Ghost Rider/Captain America: Fear #1; U.S.Agent #1-4;	#387-418	1,184	30 Jun 2026	Ron Lim Standard Edition cover: 978-1302968816
3	Captain America by Mark Gruenwald Vol. 3	1991-1993	Captain America #387–418, Annual #11; Punisher/Captain America: Blood & Glory #1–3; Ghost Rider/Captain America: Fear #1; U.S.Agent #1-4;	#387-418	1,184	30 Jun 2026	Rik Levins Capwolf DM cover: 978-1302968823
	Captain America by Mark Waid, Ron Garney & Andy Kubert	1995-1999	Captain America #444–454; Captain America (vol. 3) #1–23; Iron Man/Captain America Annual 1998; Captain America: Sentinel of Liberty #1–12, Rough Cut; material from Captain America: The Legend; Captain America: Red, White & Blue	#444-454, #468-490	1,328	6 Dec 2017	Ron Garney cover: 978-1302908317
	Captain America by Dan Jurgens	2000-2002	Captain America (vol. 3) #24–50, Annual 1999-2001; Captain America/Citizen V Annual 1998; material from Captain America: The Legend	#491-517	776	30 Jun 2021	Dan Jurgens cover: 978-1302930417
	Captain America by Dan Jurgens	2000-2002	Captain America (vol. 3) #24–50, Annual 1999-2001; Captain America/Citizen V Annual 1998; material from Captain America: The Legend	#491-517	776	30 Jun 2021	Gene Ha DM cover: 978-1302930400
1	Captain America by Ed Brubaker	2004-2007	Captain America (vol. 5) #1–25; Captain America 65th Anniversary Special; Winter Soldier: Winter Kills	#550-574	744	19 Sep 2007	Steve Epting cover: 978-0785128663
1	Captain America by Ed Brubaker	2004-2007	Captain America (vol. 5) #1–25; Captain America 65th Anniversary Special; Winter Soldier: Winter Kills	#550-574	744	9 Feb 2021	Steve Epting Leap cover: 978-1302927929
1	Captain America by Ed Brubaker	2004-2007	Captain America (vol. 5) #1–25; Captain America 65th Anniversary Special; Winter Soldier: Winter Kills	#550-574	744	9 Feb 2021	Steve Epting Grave DM cover: 978-0785131335
2	The Death of Captain America	2007-2008	Captain America (2005) #25–42	#574-591	464	25 Nov 2009	Steve Epting cover: 978-0785138068
2	The Death of Captain America	2007-2008	Captain America (2005) #25–42	#574-591	464	17 Aug 2021	Steve Epting Handcuffs cover: 978-1302929619
2	The Death of Captain America	2007-2008	Captain America (2005) #25–42	#574-591	464	17 Aug 2021	Steve Epting Red Skull Punch DM cover: 978-1302929626
3	Captain America Lives!	2008-2010	Captain America (vol. 5) #43–50; Captain America #600–601; Captain America: Reborn #1–6; Digital Prologue	#592-601	560	9 Feb 2011	Alex Ross cover: 978-0785145141
3	Captain America Lives!	2008-2010	Captain America (vol. 5) #43–50; Captain America #600–601; Captain America: Reborn #1–6; Digital Prologue	#592-601	560	15 Mar 2022	Alex Ross cover: 978-1302932428
3	Captain America Lives!	2008-2010	Captain America (vol. 5) #43–50; Captain America #600–601; Captain America: Reborn #1–6; Digital Prologue	#592-601	560	15 Mar 2022	John Cassaday DM cover: 978-1302932435
3	Captain America Lives!	2008-2010	Captain America (vol. 5) #43–50; Captain America #600–601; Captain America: Reborn #1–6; Digital Prologue	#592-601	560	13 Sep 2023	Alex Ross cover: 978-1302954468
3	Captain America Lives!	2008-2010	Captain America (vol. 5) #43–50; Captain America #600–601; Captain America: Reborn #1–6; Digital Prologue	#592-601	560	13 Sep 2023	John Cassaday DM cover: 978-1302954475
4	The Trial of Captain America	2009-2012	Captain America: Who Will Wield the Shield?; Captain America #602–615 (A-stories), #615.1, #616-619; Steve Rogers: Super-Soldier #1–4; Captain America (vol. 6) #1–10	#602-629	928	3 Dec 2014	Marko Djurdjevic cover: 978-0785192725
4	The Trial of Captain America	2009-2012	Captain America: Who Will Wield the Shield?; Captain America #602–615 (A-stories), #615.1, #616-619; Steve Rogers: Super-Soldier #1–4; Captain America (vol. 6) #1–10	#602-629	928	10 Oct 2023	Marko Djurdjevic cover: 978-1302952686
4	The Trial of Captain America	2009-2012	Captain America: Who Will Wield the Shield?; Captain America #602–615 (A-stories), #615.1, #616-619; Steve Rogers: Super-Soldier #1–4; Captain America (vol. 6) #1–10	#602-629	928	10 Oct 2023	Steve McNiven DM cover: 978-1302952693
5	Return of the Winter Soldier	2011-2013	Captain America & Bucky #620–628; Fear Itself #7.1: Captain America; Winter Soldier #1–14; Captain America (vol. 6) #11–19	#630-638	752	6 May 2015	Steve Epting cover: 978-0785192718
5	Return of the Winter Soldier	2011-2013	Captain America & Bucky #620–628; Fear Itself #7.1: Captain America; Winter Soldier #1–14; Captain America (vol. 6) #11–19	#630-638	752	7 Nov 2023	Steve Epting cover: 978-1302952631
5	Return of the Winter Soldier	2011-2013	Captain America & Bucky #620–628; Fear Itself #7.1: Captain America; Winter Soldier #1–14; Captain America (vol. 6) #11–19	#630-638	752	7 Nov 2023	Lee Bermejo DM cover: 978-1302952648
	Captain America by Rick Remender	2012-2015	Captain America (vol. 7) #1–25; Winter Soldier: The Bitter March #1–5; All-New Captain America: Fear Him #1–4; All-New Captain America #1–6; Hail Hydra #1–4	#639-669	1,080	14 Jul 2021	John Romita Jr. cover: 978-1302930479
	Captain America by Rick Remender	2012-2015	Captain America (vol. 7) #1–25; Winter Soldier: The Bitter March #1–5; All-New Captain America: Fear Him #1–4; All-New Captain America #1–6; Hail Hydra #1–4	#639-669	1,080	14 Jul 2021	Stuart Immonen DM cover: 978-1302930462
1	Captain America by Nick Spencer Vol. 1	2015-2017	Captain America: Sam Wilson #1–17; Captain America: Steve Rogers #1–11; Avengers Standoff: Welcome to Pleasant Hill; Avengers Standoff: Assault on Pleasant Hill Alpha; Avengers Standoff: Assault on Pleasant Hill Omega; Civil War II: The Oath; material from FCBD 2016: Captain America	#670-686	888	14 Feb 2023	Jesus Saiz cover: 978-1302949617
1	Captain America by Nick Spencer Vol. 1	2015-2017	Captain America: Sam Wilson #1–17; Captain America: Steve Rogers #1–11; Avengers Standoff: Welcome to Pleasant Hill; Avengers Standoff: Assault on Pleasant Hill Alpha; Avengers Standoff: Assault on Pleasant Hill Omega; Civil War II: The Oath; material from FCBD 2016: Captain America	#670-686	888	14 Feb 2023	Alex Ross DM cover: 978-1302949600
2	Captain America by Nick Spencer Vol. 2	2017	Captain America: Sam Wilson #18–24; Captain America: Steve Rogers #12–19; Captain America (vol. 8) #25; Secret Empire #0–10; Secret Empire Omega; Generations: Sam Wilson Captain America & Steve Rogers Captain America; material from FCBD 2017: Secret Empire; Not Brand Ecch (2017) #14	#687-694	904	21 May 2024	Jesus Saiz cover: 978-1302953706
2	Captain America by Nick Spencer Vol. 2	2017	Captain America: Sam Wilson #18–24; Captain America: Steve Rogers #12–19; Captain America (vol. 8) #25; Secret Empire #0–10; Secret Empire Omega; Generations: Sam Wilson Captain America & Steve Rogers Captain America; material from FCBD 2017: Secret Empire; Not Brand Ecch (2017) #14	#687-694	904	21 May 2024	Elizabeth Torque DM cover: 978-1302953713
	Black Widow & Captain America by Waid & Samnee	2016-2018	Black Widow (vol. 6) #1-12; Captain America #695-696, 697 (A-story), 698–704	#695-704	536	24 Mar 2026	Chris Samnee Black Widow cover: 978-1302966577
	Black Widow & Captain America by Waid & Samnee	2016-2018	Black Widow (vol. 6) #1-12; Captain America #695-696, 697 (A-story), 698–704	#695-704	536	24 Mar 2026	Chris Samnee Captain America DM cover: 978-1302966584
	Captain America by Ta-Nehisi Coates	2018-2021	Captain America (vol. 9) #1–30; FCBD 2018: Avengers/Captain America (Captain America story)	#705-734	696	25 Jul 2023	Alex Ross cover: 978-1302948474
	Captain America by Ta-Nehisi Coates	2018-2021	Captain America (vol. 9) #1–30; FCBD 2018: Avengers/Captain America (Captain America story)	#705-734	696	25 Jul 2023	Alex Ross Capitol DM cover: 978-1302948481

=== Captain Britain ===
#	Title	Years covered	Material collected	Pages	Released	ISBN
	Captain Britain by Alan Moore and Alan Davis	1981-1987	Material from Marvel Super-Heroes (U.K.) #377–388; The Daredevils (U.K.) #1–11; Captain America #305–306; The Mighty World of Marvel #7–16; Captain Britain (1985) #1–14; New Mutants Annual #2; Uncanny X-Men Annual #11	688	15 Jul 2009	Alan Davis Union Flag cover: 978-0785137603
	Captain Britain by Alan Moore and Alan Davis	1981-1987	Material from Marvel Super-Heroes (U.K.) #377–388; The Daredevils (U.K.) #1–11; Captain America #305–306; The Mighty World of Marvel #7–16; Captain Britain (1985) #1–14; New Mutants Annual #2; Uncanny X-Men Annual #11	688	15 Jul 2009	Alan Davis Lionheart DM cover: 978-0785137719
	Captain Britain	1976-1987	Material from Captain Britain (1976) #1–39; Super Spider-Man & Captain Britain #231–247; Hulk (U.K.) #1, 3–46; Incredible Hulk Weekly (U.K.) #47–55, 57–63; Marvel Super Heroes (U.K.) #377–388; The Daredevils (U.K.) #1–11; The Mighty World of Marvel #7–16; Captain Britain (1985) #1–14; Marvel Tales #131–133; Marvel Team-Up #65–66; New Mutants Annual #2; Uncanny X-Men Annual #11	1,368	12 Apr 2022	Alan Davis cover: 978-1302932268
	Captain Britain	1976-1987	Material from Captain Britain (1976) #1–39; Super Spider-Man & Captain Britain #231–247; Hulk (U.K.) #1, 3–46; Incredible Hulk Weekly (U.K.) #47–55, 57–63; Marvel Super Heroes (U.K.) #377–388; The Daredevils (U.K.) #1–11; The Mighty World of Marvel #7–16; Captain Britain (1985) #1–14; Marvel Tales #131–133; Marvel Team-Up #65–66; New Mutants Annual #2; Uncanny X-Men Annual #11	1,368	12 Apr 2022	Ron Wilson DM cover: 978-1302932275

=== Captain Marvel ===
==== Carol Danvers ====
#	Title	Years covered	Material collected	Legacy	Pages	Released	ISBN
	Captain Marvel: Ms. Marvel – A Hero Is Born	1977-1992	Ms. Marvel #1–23; Marvel Team-Up #61–62, 76–77; Defenders #57; Marvel Two-in-One #51; Avengers #200, Annual #10; material from Avengers #197–199, Marvel Super-Heroes (1990) #10–11 and Marvel Fanfare #24	#1-23	720	20 Feb 2019	Amanda Conner cover: 978-1302915391
	Captain Marvel: Ms. Marvel – A Hero Is Born	1977-1992	Ms. Marvel #1–23; Marvel Team-Up #61–62, 76–77; Defenders #57; Marvel Two-in-One #51; Avengers #200, Annual #10; material from Avengers #197–199, Marvel Super-Heroes (1990) #10–11 and Marvel Fanfare #24	#1-23	720	20 Feb 2019	John Romita Sr. DM cover: 978-1302915407
	Captain Marvel by Kelly Sue DeConnick	2012-2015	Captain Marvel (2012) #1–17; Captain Marvel (2014) #1–15; Avengers: The Enemy Within #1; Avengers Assemble #16–19; Avenging Spider-Man #9–10; Captain Marvel & the Carol Corps #1–4	#74-105	976	17 Dec 2022	David Lopez cover: 978-1302946678
	Captain Marvel by Kelly Sue DeConnick	2012-2015	Captain Marvel (2012) #1–17; Captain Marvel (2014) #1–15; Avengers: The Enemy Within #1; Avengers Assemble #16–19; Avenging Spider-Man #9–10; Captain Marvel & the Carol Corps #1–4	#74-105	976	17 Dec 2022	Jamie McKelvie DM cover: 978-1302946685
1	Captain Marvel by Kelly Thompson Vol. 1	2019-2021	Captain Marvel (2019) #1–26; Star (2020) #1–5; Captain Marvel: The End #1	#135-160	736	30 May 2023	Jorge Molina cover: 978-1302949952
1	Captain Marvel by Kelly Thompson Vol. 1	2019-2021	Captain Marvel (2019) #1–26; Star (2020) #1–5; Captain Marvel: The End #1	#135-160	736	30 May 2023	Alex Ross DM cover: 978-1302949945
2	Captain Marvel: Highest, Furthest, Fastest	2021-2024	Captain Marvel (2019) #27-50, Annual #1; X-Men (2021) #19-21; Captain Marvel: Dark Tempest #1-5; Captain Marvel: Assault on Eden; Captain Marvel (2023) #1-10	#161-194	1,072	16 Jun 2026	Carmen Carnero cover: 978-1302955786
2	Captain Marvel: Highest, Furthest, Fastest	2021-2024	Captain Marvel (2019) #27-50, Annual #1; X-Men (2021) #19-21; Captain Marvel: Dark Tempest #1-5; Captain Marvel: Assault on Eden; Captain Marvel (2023) #1-10	#161-194	1,072	16 Jun 2026	Stephen Segovia DM cover: 978-1302955793
Jump to: Ms Marvel

==== Genis-Vell ====
#	Title	Years covered	Material collected	Pages	Released	ISBN
	Captain Marvel: Genis-Vell by Peter David	1999-2004	Captain Marvel (1999) #0–35, Captain Marvel (2002) #1–25	1,400	10 Oct 2023	ChrisCross cover: 978-1302951658
	Captain Marvel: Genis-Vell by Peter David	1999-2004	Captain Marvel (1999) #0–35, Captain Marvel (2002) #1–25	1,400	10 Oct 2023	Alex Ross DM cover: 978-1302951665

==== Mar-Vell ====
#	Title	Years covered	Material collected	Pages	Released	ISBN
1	Captain Mar-Vell Vol. 1	1967-1974	Marvel Super-Heroes #12–13; Captain Marvel (1968) #1–33; Iron Man #55; material from Not Brand Echh #9	888	31 Jan 2023	Gil Kane cover: 978-1302948658
1	Captain Mar-Vell Vol. 1	1967-1974	Marvel Super-Heroes #12–13; Captain Marvel (1968) #1–33; Iron Man #55; material from Not Brand Echh #9	888	31 Jan 2023	Gene Colan DM cover: 978-1302948665
2	The Death of Captain Marvel	1974-1982	Captain Marvel (1968) #34–62; Marvel Spotlight #1-4, 8; Avengers Annual #7; Two-In-One Annual #2; Marvel Graphic Novel #1: The Death of Captain Marvel; material from Marvel Super Heroes (1990) #3; What If...? (1977) #17; What If...? (1989) #14	920	7 Oct 2025	Jeff Aclin cover: 978-1302962531
2	The Death of Captain Marvel	1974-1982	Captain Marvel (1968) #34–62; Marvel Spotlight #1-4, 8; Avengers Annual #7; Two-In-One Annual #2; Marvel Graphic Novel #1: The Death of Captain Marvel; material from Marvel Super Heroes (1990) #3; What If...? (1977) #17; What If...? (1989) #14	920	7 Oct 2025	Jim Starlin DM cover: 978-1302962548

=== Carnage ===
#	Title	Years covered	Material collected	Pages	Released	ISBN
	Carnage	2004-2017	Venom vs. Carnage #1–4; Carnage #1–5; Carnage U.S.A. #1–5; Minimum Carnage: Alpha #1; Minimum Carnage: Omega #1; Scarlet Spider #10–11; Venom (vol. 2) #26–27; Superior Carnage #1–5, Annual #1; Deadpool vs. Carnage #1–4; Axis: Carnage #1–3; Nova (vol. 5) #26–27; Carnage (vol. 2) #1–16; material from All-New All-Different Marvel #1	1,168	25 Apr 2018	Clayton Crain cover: 978-1302912277
Jump to: Absolute Carnage

=== Cloak and Dagger ===
#	Title	Years covered	Material collected	Pages	Released	ISBN
1	Cloak and Dagger Vol. 1	1982-1987	Peter Parker, the Spectacular Spider-Man #64, 69–70, 81–82, 94–96; Cloak and Dagger (1983) #1–4; Marvel Team-Up Annual #6; Marvel Fanfare (1982) #19; New Mutants #23–25; Cloak and Dagger (1985) #1–11; Doctor Strange #78; Marvel Graphic Novel No. 56 – Power Pack & Cloak and Dagger: Shelter from the Storm; material from Strange Tales (1987) #1–2	880	15 Sep 2020	Rick Leonardi cover: 978-1302924669
1	Cloak and Dagger Vol. 1	1982-1987	Peter Parker, the Spectacular Spider-Man #64, 69–70, 81–82, 94–96; Cloak and Dagger (1983) #1–4; Marvel Team-Up Annual #6; Marvel Fanfare (1982) #19; New Mutants #23–25; Cloak and Dagger (1985) #1–11; Doctor Strange #78; Marvel Graphic Novel No. 56 – Power Pack & Cloak and Dagger: Shelter from the Storm; material from Strange Tales (1987) #1–2	880	15 Sep 2020	Ed Hannigan DM cover: 978-1302924676
2	Cloak and Dagger Vol. 2	1987-1991	Marvel Graphic Novel No. 34 – Cloak and Dagger: Predator and Prey; Strange Tales (1987) #7; Mutant Misadventures of Cloak and Dagger #1–13; Cloak and Dagger (1990) #14–19; material from Strange Tales (1987) #3–6, 8–19	800	16 Nov 2021	Rick Leonardi cover: 978-1302930677
2	Cloak and Dagger Vol. 2	1987-1991	Marvel Graphic Novel No. 34 – Cloak and Dagger: Predator and Prey; Strange Tales (1987) #7; Mutant Misadventures of Cloak and Dagger #1–13; Cloak and Dagger (1990) #14–19; material from Strange Tales (1987) #3–6, 8–19	800	16 Nov 2021	Larry Stroman DM cover: 978-1302930684

=== Daredevil ===
- See also: Daredevil collected editions

#	Title	Years covered	Material collected	Legacy	Pages	Released	ISBN
1	Daredevil Omnibus Vol. 1	1964-1968	Daredevil #1–41, Annual #1 (1967); Fantastic Four (vol. 1) #73; Not Brand Echh #4	#1-41	1,088	14 Feb 2017	Alex Ross cover: 978-1302904272
1	Daredevil Omnibus Vol. 1	1964-1968	Daredevil #1–41, Annual #1 (1967); Fantastic Four (vol. 1) #73; Not Brand Echh #4	#1-41	1,088	14 Feb 2017	Jack Kirby DM cover: 978-1302905187
2	Daredevil Omnibus Vol. 2	1968-1971	Daredevil #42–74; Iron Man #35, material from #36	#42-74	800	30 May 2023	Gene Colan cover: 978-1302948696
2	Daredevil Omnibus Vol. 2	1968-1971	Daredevil #42–74; Iron Man #35, material from #36	#42-74	800	30 May 2023	Gene Colan Unmasked DM cover: 978-1302948702
3	Daredevil Omnibus Vol. 3	1971-1974	Daredevil #75–119; Avengers #111; Marvel Two in One #3; material from Amazing Adventures #1-8	#75-119	1,160	9 Apr 2024	Rich Buckler cover: 978-1302955182
3	Daredevil Omnibus Vol. 3	1971-1974	Daredevil #75–119; Avengers #111; Marvel Two in One #3; material from Amazing Adventures #1-8	#75-119	1,160	9 Apr 2024	John Romita Sr. DM cover: 978-1302955199
4	Daredevil Omnibus Vol. 4	1975-1979	Daredevil ##120-158, Annual #4; Ghost Rider #20; Marvel Premiere (1972) #39-40, #43; material from What If...? #8	#120-158	976	22 Sep 2026	Gil Kane cover: 978-1302968489
4	Daredevil Omnibus Vol. 4	1975-1979	Daredevil ##120-158, Annual #4; Ghost Rider #20; Marvel Premiere (1972) #39-40, #43; material from What If...? #8	#120-158	976	22 Sep 2026	Gene Colan DM cover: 978-1302968496
	Daredevil by Frank Miller & Klaus Janson	1979-1983	Daredevil #158–161, 163–191; What If? #28	#158–161, #163–191	840	7 Mar 2007	Frank Miller red & black cover: 978-0785126690
	Daredevil by Frank Miller & Klaus Janson	1979-1983	Daredevil #158–161, 163–191; What If? #28	#158–161, #163–191	840	7 Mar 2007	Daredevil #181 cover: 978-0785123439
	Daredevil by Frank Miller & Klaus Janson	1979-1983	Daredevil #158–161, 163–191; What If? #28	#158–161, #163–191	840	6 Nov 2013	Frank Miller red & black cover: 978-0785185680
	Daredevil by Frank Miller & Klaus Janson	1979-1983	Daredevil #158–161, 163–191; What If? #28	#158–161, #163–191	840	2 Mar 2016	Frank Miller red & black cover: 978-0785195368
	Daredevil by Frank Miller & Klaus Janson	1979-1983	Daredevil #158–161, 163–191; What If? #28	#158–161, #163–191	840	31 Jan 2023	Frank Miller poster cover: 978-1302945534
	Daredevil by Frank Miller & Klaus Janson	1979-1983	Daredevil #158–161, 163–191; What If? #28	#158–161, #163–191	840	31 Jan 2023	Daredevil #181 cover: 978-1302945541
	Daredevil by Frank Miller Companion	1985-1986	Peter Parker, the Spectacular Spider–Man #27–28; Daredevil #219, 226–233; Daredevil: The Man Without Fear #1–5; Daredevil: Love and War	#219, #226-233	608	28 Dec 2007	David Mazzucchelli Apocalypse cover: 978-0785123507
	Daredevil by Frank Miller Companion	1985-1986	Peter Parker, the Spectacular Spider–Man #27–28; Daredevil #219, 226–233; Daredevil: The Man Without Fear #1–5; Daredevil: Love and War	#219, #226-233	608	28 Dec 2007	Frank Miller red & black DM cover: 978-0785126768
	Daredevil by Frank Miller Companion	1985-1986	Peter Parker, the Spectacular Spider–Man #27–28; Daredevil #219, 226–233; Daredevil: The Man Without Fear #1–5; Daredevil: Love and War	#219, #226-233	608	6 Apr 2016	Frank Miller red & black cover: 978-0785195382
	Daredevil by Frank Miller Companion	1985-1986	Peter Parker, the Spectacular Spider–Man #27–28; Daredevil #219, 226–233; Daredevil: The Man Without Fear #1–5; Daredevil: Love and War	#219, #226-233	608	14 May 2024	Frank Miller red & black cover: 978-1302957650
	Daredevil by Frank Miller Companion	1985-1986	Peter Parker, the Spectacular Spider–Man #27–28; Daredevil #219, 226–233; Daredevil: The Man Without Fear #1–5; Daredevil: Love and War	#219, #226-233	608	14 May 2024	David Mazzucchelli Apocalypse DM cover: 978-1302957667
1	Daredevil by Nocenti & Romita Jr. Vol. 1	1986-1989	Daredevil #234–266; Punisher (1987) #10	#234-266	856	25 Feb 2025	John Romita Jr cover: 978-1302963729
1	Daredevil by Nocenti & Romita Jr. Vol. 1	1986-1989	Daredevil #234–266; Punisher (1987) #10	#234-266	856	25 Feb 2025	Keith Pollard DM cover: 978-1302963736
2	Daredevil by Nocenti & Romita Jr. Vol. 2	1989-1991	Daredevil #267-291, Annual #5-6; Spectacular Spider-Man #213-214; material from Marvel Comics Presents #109-116, 123-130, 150-151; Marvel Holiday Special #2	#267-291	992	28 Jul 2026	John Romita Jr cover: 978-1302968830
2	Daredevil by Nocenti & Romita Jr. Vol. 2	1989-1991	Daredevil #267-291, Annual #5-6; Spectacular Spider-Man #213-214; material from Marvel Comics Presents #109-116, 123-130, 150-151; Marvel Holiday Special #2	#267-291	992	28 Jul 2026	Mark Bagley DM cover: 978-1302968847
	Marvel Knights by Joe Quesada	1998-2006	Daredevil (vol. 2) #1–15, #½; Daredevil: Father #1–6; Marvel Authentix: Daredevil #1; material from Marvel Knights Double–Shot #1	#381-395	730	6 Nov 2018	978-1302914066
1	Daredevil by Brian Michael Bendis & Alex Maleev Vol. 1	2001-2004	Daredevil (vol. 2) #16–19, 26–50, 56–60	#396-399, #406-430, #436-440	848	27 Aug 2008	978-0785131120
1	Daredevil by Brian Michael Bendis & Alex Maleev Vol. 1	2001-2004	Daredevil (vol. 2) #16–19, 26–50, 56–60	#396-399, #406-430, #436-440	848	8 Jan 2020	978-1302921668
1	Daredevil by Brian Michael Bendis & Alex Maleev Vol. 1	2001-2004	Daredevil (vol. 2) #16–19, 26–50, 56–60	#396-399, #406-430, #436-440	848	6 Aug 2024	Alex Maleev cover: 978-1302957636
1	Daredevil by Brian Michael Bendis & Alex Maleev Vol. 1	2001-2004	Daredevil (vol. 2) #16–19, 26–50, 56–60	#396-399, #406-430, #436-440	848	6 Aug 2024	David Mack DM cover: 978-1302957643
2	Daredevil by Brian Michael Bendis & Alex Maleev Vol. 2	2004-2006	Daredevil (vol. 2) #61–81; What If...Karen Page Had Lived; Ultimate Marvel Team–Up #6–8	#441-461	656	23 Dec 2009	978-0785138136
2	Daredevil by Brian Michael Bendis & Alex Maleev Vol. 2	2004-2006	Daredevil (vol. 2) #61–81; What If...Karen Page Had Lived; Ultimate Marvel Team–Up #6–8	#441-461	656	12 Feb 2020	978-1302921675
2	Daredevil by Brian Michael Bendis & Alex Maleev Vol. 2	2004-2006	Daredevil (vol. 2) #61–81; What If...Karen Page Had Lived; Ultimate Marvel Team–Up #6–8	#441-461	656	21 Jan 2025	Alex Maleev cover: 978-1302959166
2	Daredevil by Brian Michael Bendis & Alex Maleev Vol. 2	2004-2006	Daredevil (vol. 2) #61–81; What If...Karen Page Had Lived; Ultimate Marvel Team–Up #6–8	#441-461	656	21 Jan 2025	Joe Quesada DM cover: 978-1302959173
1	Daredevil by Ed Brubaker & Michael Lark Vol. 1	2006-2008	Daredevil (vol. 2) #82–105	#462-485	608	3 Jun 2009	978-0785137856
1	Daredevil by Ed Brubaker & Michael Lark Vol. 1	2006-2008	Daredevil (vol. 2) #82–105	#462-485	608	5 Apr 2017	978-1302905088
1	Daredevil by Ed Brubaker & Michael Lark Vol. 1	2006-2008	Daredevil (vol. 2) #82–105	#462-485	608	7 Jun 2022	Marko Djurdjevic cover: 978-1302945510
1	Daredevil by Ed Brubaker & Michael Lark Vol. 1	2006-2008	Daredevil (vol. 2) #82–105	#462-485	608	7 Jun 2022	David Finch DM cover: 978-1302945527
2	Daredevil by Ed Brubaker & Michael Lark Vol. 2	2008-2009	Daredevil (vol. 2) #106–119, Annual #1; Daredevil #500; Blood of the Tarantula	#486-500	472	3 Jun 2010	978-0785145202
2	Daredevil by Ed Brubaker & Michael Lark Vol. 2	2008-2009	Daredevil (vol. 2) #106–119, Annual #1; Daredevil #500; Blood of the Tarantula	#486-500	472	3 May 2017	978-1302908591
2	Daredevil by Ed Brubaker & Michael Lark Vol. 2	2008-2009	Daredevil (vol. 2) #106–119, Annual #1; Daredevil #500; Blood of the Tarantula	#486-500	472	24 Mar 2024	Marko Djurdjevic cover: 978-1302957575
2	Daredevil by Ed Brubaker & Michael Lark Vol. 2	2008-2009	Daredevil (vol. 2) #106–119, Annual #1; Daredevil #500; Blood of the Tarantula	#486-500	472	24 Mar 2024	Joe Quesada DM cover: 978-1302957582
	Daredevil: Shadowland Omnibus	2009-2011	Daredevil (vol. 2) #501–512; Dark Reign: The List – Daredevil #1; Shadowland #1–5; Shadowland: Elektra, Bullseye, Ghost Rider, Spider–Man, After the Fall; Shadowland: Moon Knight #1–3; Shadowland: Blood on the Streets #1–4; Shadowland: Daughters of the Shadow #1–3; Shadowland: Power Man #1–4; Thunderbolts (1997) #148–149; Daredevil: Reborn #1–4	#501-512	1,112	7 Feb 2018	John Cassaday cover: 978-1302910372
	Daredevil: Shadowland Omnibus	2009-2011	Daredevil (vol. 2) #501–512; Dark Reign: The List – Daredevil #1; Shadowland #1–5; Shadowland: Elektra, Bullseye, Ghost Rider, Spider–Man, After the Fall; Shadowland: Moon Knight #1–3; Shadowland: Blood on the Streets #1–4; Shadowland: Daughters of the Shadow #1–3; Shadowland: Power Man #1–4; Thunderbolts (1997) #148–149; Daredevil: Reborn #1–4	#501-512	1,112	7 Feb 2018	Billy Tan DM cover: 978-1302911140
	Daredevil: Shadowland Omnibus	2009-2011	Daredevil (vol. 2) #501–512; Dark Reign: The List – Daredevil #1; Shadowland #1–5; Shadowland: Elektra, Bullseye, Ghost Rider, Spider–Man, After the Fall; Shadowland: Moon Knight #1–3; Shadowland: Blood on the Streets #1–4; Shadowland: Daughters of the Shadow #1–3; Shadowland: Power Man #1–4; Thunderbolts (1997) #148–149; Daredevil: Reborn #1–4	#501-512	1,112	24 Jul 2024	John Cassaday cover: 978-1302957780
	Daredevil: Shadowland Omnibus	2009-2011	Daredevil (vol. 2) #501–512; Dark Reign: The List – Daredevil #1; Shadowland #1–5; Shadowland: Elektra, Bullseye, Ghost Rider, Spider–Man, After the Fall; Shadowland: Moon Knight #1–3; Shadowland: Blood on the Streets #1–4; Shadowland: Daughters of the Shadow #1–3; Shadowland: Power Man #1–4; Thunderbolts (1997) #148–149; Daredevil: Reborn #1–4	#501-512	1,112	24 Jul 2024	Billy Tan DM cover: 978-1302957797
1	Daredevil by Mark Waid Omnibus Vol. 1	2011-2013	Daredevil (vol. 3) #1–27, 10.1; Amazing Spider–Man #677; Avenging Spider–Man #6; The Punisher (2011) #10	#513-539	728	1 Mar 2017	978-1302904265
1	Daredevil by Mark Waid Omnibus Vol. 1	2011-2013	Daredevil (vol. 3) #1–27, 10.1; Amazing Spider–Man #677; Avenging Spider–Man #6; The Punisher (2011) #10	#513-539	720	7 Nov 2023	Paolo Rivera cover: 978-1302952778
1	Daredevil by Mark Waid Omnibus Vol. 1	2011-2013	Daredevil (vol. 3) #1–27, 10.1; Amazing Spider–Man #677; Avenging Spider–Man #6; The Punisher (2011) #10	#513-539	720	7 Nov 2023	Neal Adams DM cover: 978-1302952785
2	Daredevil by Mark Waid & Chris Samnee Omnibus Vol. 2	2013-2015	Daredevil (vol. 3) #28–36; Indestructible Hulk #9–10; Daredevil (vol. 4) #1–18, #1.50, #0.1, #15.1	#540-566	768	7 Mar 2018	978-1302908980
2	Daredevil by Mark Waid & Chris Samnee Omnibus Vol. 2	2013-2015	Daredevil (vol. 3) #28–36; Indestructible Hulk #9–10; Daredevil (vol. 4) #1–18, #1.50, #0.1, #15.1	#540-566	768	3 Jan 2024	Chris Samnee cover: 978-1302952808
2	Daredevil by Mark Waid & Chris Samnee Omnibus Vol. 2	2013-2015	Daredevil (vol. 3) #28–36; Indestructible Hulk #9–10; Daredevil (vol. 4) #1–18, #1.50, #0.1, #15.1	#540-566	768	3 Jan 2024	Frank Cho DM cover: 978-1302952815
	Daredevil by Charles Soule Omnibus	2015-2018	Daredevil (vol. 5) #1–28, #595–612; Daredevil Annual (2016) #1; Daredevil/Punisher: Seventh Circle #1–4; material from All–New, All–Different Point One #1	#567-612	1,216	4 Jan 2022	Phil Noto cover: 978-1302929657
	Daredevil by Charles Soule Omnibus	2015-2018	Daredevil (vol. 5) #1–28, #595–612; Daredevil Annual (2016) #1; Daredevil/Punisher: Seventh Circle #1–4; material from All–New, All–Different Point One #1	#567-612	1,216	4 Jan 2022	David Lopez DM cover: 978-1302929664
1	Daredevil by Chip Zdarsky Omnibus Vol. 1	2019-2021	Daredevil (vol. 6) #1–30, Annual (2020)	#613-642	696	23 Jul 2024	Julian Tedesco cover: 978-1302956219
1	Daredevil by Chip Zdarsky Omnibus Vol. 1	2019-2021	Daredevil (vol. 6) #1–30, Annual (2020)	#613-642	696	23 Jul 2024	Marco Checchetto DM cover: 978-1302956226
Jump to: Devil's Reign omnibus
2	Daredevil by Chip Zdarsky Omnibus Vol. 2	2021-2023	Daredevil (vol. 6) #31–36; Daredevil: Woman Without Fear (2022) #1–3; Devil's Reign (2021) #1–6; Devil's Reign Omega (2022); Daredevil (vol. 7) #1–14	#643-662	768	31 Dec 2024	Rafael De Latorre cover: 978-1302956264
2	Daredevil by Chip Zdarsky Omnibus Vol. 2	2021-2023	Daredevil (vol. 6) #31–36; Daredevil: Woman Without Fear (2022) #1–3; Devil's Reign (2021) #1–6; Devil's Reign Omega (2022); Daredevil (vol. 7) #1–14	#643-662	768	31 Dec 2024	Marco Checchetto DM cover: 978-1302956271

=== Dazzler ===
#	Title	Years covered	Material collected	Pages	Released	ISBN
	Dazzler	1979-1988	X-Men #130–131, Amazing Spider-Man #203, Dazzler #1–42, Marvel Graphic Novel No. 12 – Dazzler: The Movie, Beauty and the Beast #1–4, Secret Wars II #4; material from What If #33, Marvel Fanfare #38	1,360	15 Oct 2024	Stanley Lau "Artgerm" cover: 978-1302959609
	Dazzler	1979-1988	X-Men #130–131, Amazing Spider-Man #203, Dazzler #1–42, Marvel Graphic Novel No. 12 – Dazzler: The Movie, Beauty and the Beast #1–4, Secret Wars II #4; material from What If #33, Marvel Fanfare #38	1,360	15 Oct 2024	Bob Larkin DM cover: 978-1302959616

=== The Deadly Hands of Kung Fu ===
#	Title	Years covered	Material collected	Pages	Released	ISBN
1	The Deadly Hands of Kung Fu Vol. 1	1974-1975	Deadly Hands of Kung Fu #1–18; Deadly Hands of Kung Fu Special Album Edition #1; Deadliest Heroes of Kung Fu #1	1,152	9 Nov 2016	Gabriele Dell'Otto cover: 978-1302901332
1	The Deadly Hands of Kung Fu Vol. 1	1974-1975	Deadly Hands of Kung Fu #1–18; Deadly Hands of Kung Fu Special Album Edition #1; Deadliest Heroes of Kung Fu #1	1,152	9 Nov 2016	Nick Cardy DM cover: 978-1302901752
2	The Deadly Hands of Kung Fu Vol. 2	1975-1981	Deadly Hands of Kung Fu #19–33; material from Bizarre Adventures #25	1,000	7 Jun 2017	Jeff Dekal cover: 978-1302901349
2	The Deadly Hands of Kung Fu Vol. 2	1975-1981	Deadly Hands of Kung Fu #19–33; material from Bizarre Adventures #25	1,000	7 Jun 2017	Earl Norem DM cover: 978-1302901844
Jump to: Shang-Chi, Master of Kung Fu omnibuses

=== Deadpool ===
#	Title	Years covered	Material collected	Legacy	Pages	Released	ISBN
	Deadpool: Beginnings	1990-2000	New Mutants #98; X-Force #2, 11, 15, 47, 56; Nomad (vol. 2) #4; Deadpool: The Circle Chase #1–4; Secret Defenders #15–17; Deadpool #1–4; Wolverine (vol. 2) #88, 154–155, Annual (1995), (1999); Heroes for Hire #10–11; Deadpool Team-Up #1; material from Avengers #366; Silver Sable and the Wild Pack #23	#1-8	768	25 Jan 2017	Pete Woods cover: 978-1302904296
	Deadpool by Joe Kelly	1997-1999	Deadpool (vol. 2) #1–33, -1, 0; Daredevil/Deadpool Annual (1997); Deadpool/Death Annual (1998); Baby's First Deadpool Book #1; Amazing Spider-Man #47, 611; material from Deadpool (vol. 3) #900	#9-41	1,160	31 Dec 2013	Ed McGuinness Spider-Man cover: 978-0785185598
	Deadpool by Joe Kelly	1997-1999	Deadpool (vol. 2) #1–33, -1, 0; Daredevil/Deadpool Annual (1997); Deadpool/Death Annual (1998); Baby's First Deadpool Book #1; Amazing Spider-Man #47, 611; material from Deadpool (vol. 3) #900	#9-41	1,160	31 Dec 2013	Ed McGuinness leaping DM cover: 978-0785185604
	Deadpool Classic	1999-2003	Deadpool (vol. 2) #34–69; Black Panther (vol. 3) #23; Agent X #1–15; Fight-Man #1; material from X-Men Unlimited #28	#42-92	1,299	6 Jan 2016	Arthur Adams cover: 978-0785196747
	Deadpool & Cable	2004-2008	Cable & Deadpool #1–50; Deadpool/GLI: Summer Fun Spectacular #1; material from Deadpool (vol. 4) #27	#93-142	1,272	29 Nov 2014	Rob Liefeld cover: 978-0785192763
	Deadpool & Cable	2004-2008	Cable & Deadpool #1–50; Deadpool/GLI: Summer Fun Spectacular #1; material from Deadpool (vol. 4) #27	#93-142	1,272	25 Apr 2023	Rob Liefeld cover: 978-1302949921
	Deadpool & Cable	2004-2008	Cable & Deadpool #1–50; Deadpool/GLI: Summer Fun Spectacular #1; material from Deadpool (vol. 4) #27	#93-142	1,272	25 Apr 2023	Mark Brooks DM cover: 978-1302949938
1	Deadpool by Daniel Way Vol. 1	2008-2010	Wolverine: Origins #21–25; Deadpool (vol. 3) #1–26; Thunderbolts #130–131; Hit-Monkey #1; Hit-Monkey (vol. 2) #1–3; Deadpool Saga	#143-168	896	20 Feb 2018	Jason Pearson cover: 978-1302910068
2	Deadpool by Daniel Way Vol. 2	2010-2012	Deadpool (vol. 3) #27–63, 33.1, 49.1	#169-205	880	21 Aug 2018	Nick Bradshaw cover: 978-1302911416
	Deadpool by Posehn & Duggan	2012-2015	Deadpool (vol. 4) #1–45; Deadpool: Dracula's Gauntlet #1–7; Death of Wolverine: Deadpool and Captain America #1	#206-250	1,360	20 Dec 2016	Phil Noto cover: 978-1302902285
	Deadpool and Co.	2009-2011	Marvel Zombies 4 #1–4; Deadpool: Merc with a Mouth #1–13; Lady Deadpool #1; Prelude to Deadpool Corps #1–5; Deadpool Corps #1–12; Deadpool Family #1; Deadpool Team-Up #899–883		1,320	16 Jan 2018	Humberto Ramos cover: 978-1302910051
0	Deadpool Minibus Vol. 0	2009-2011	Deadpool: Suicide Kings #1–5; Deadpool: Wade Wilson's War #1–4; Deadpool Pulp #1–4; Amazing Spider-Man Annual #38; Deadpool Annual #1; Incredible Hulks Annual #1; Fear Itself: Deadpool #1–3		496	7 Mar 2018	Mike McKone cover: 978-1302910112
1	Deadpool Minibus Vol. 1	2012-2014	Deadpool Kills the Marvel Universe #1–4; Deadpool Killustrated #1–4; Deadpool Kills Deadpool #1–4; Night of the Living Deadpool #1–4; Deadpool vs. Carnage #1–4		480	3 Sep 2014	Michael Del Mundo cover: 978-0785190301
1	Deadpool Minibus Vol. 1	2012-2014	Deadpool Kills the Marvel Universe #1–4; Deadpool Killustrated #1–4; Deadpool Kills Deadpool #1–4; Night of the Living Deadpool #1–4; Deadpool vs. Carnage #1–4		480	6 Jul 2016	Michael Del Mundo cover: 978-1302901929
2	Deadpool Minibus Vol. 2	2014-2015	Deadpool vs. X-Force #1–4; Hawkeye vs. Deadpool #0–4; Deadpool's Art of War #1–4; Return of the Living Deadpool #1–4; Deadpool's Secret Secret Wars #1–4		512	31 Aug 2016	Pepe Larraz cover: 978-1302901974
3	Deadpool Minibus Vol. 3	2015-2017	Mrs. Deadpool and the Howling Commandos #1–4; Deadpool vs. Thanos #1–4; Deadpool & Cable: Split Second #1–3; Deadpool vs. Gambit #1–5; Deadpool: Too Soon? #1–4		544	27 Mar 2019	Tradd Moore cover: 978-1302915926

=== Defenders ===
#	Title	Years covered	Material collected	Pages	Released	ISBN
1	The Defenders Vol. 1	1969-1974	Doctor Strange #183; Sub-Mariner #22, 34–35; Incredible Hulk #126; Marvel Feature #1–3; Defenders #1–19, Giant-Size Defenders #1–2; Avengers #115 (B-story), 116–118	768	7 Apr 2021	Jorge Molina cover: 978-1302928599
1	The Defenders Vol. 1	1969-1974	Doctor Strange #183; Sub-Mariner #22, 34–35; Incredible Hulk #126; Marvel Feature #1–3; Defenders #1–19, Giant-Size Defenders #1–2; Avengers #115 (B-story), 116–118	768	7 Apr 2021	Neal Adams DM cover: 978-1302928605
1	The Defenders Vol. 1	1969-1974	Doctor Strange #183; Sub-Mariner #22, 34–35; Incredible Hulk #126; Marvel Feature #1–3; Defenders #1–19, Giant-Size Defenders #1–2; Avengers #115 (B-story), 116–118	768	7 Apr 2021	Gil Kane DM cover: 978-1302928865
2	The Defenders Vol. 2	1974-1976	Defenders #20–41, Annual #1, Giant-Size Defenders #3–5; Marvel Two-in-One #6–7; Marvel Treasury Edition #12; Marvel Super-Heroes #18; material from Mystery Tales #21, World of Fantasy #11 and Tales of Suspense #9	704	11 Jul 2023	Al Milgrom cover: 978-1302948771
2	The Defenders Vol. 2	1974-1976	Defenders #20–41, Annual #1, Giant-Size Defenders #3–5; Marvel Two-in-One #6–7; Marvel Treasury Edition #12; Marvel Super-Heroes #18; material from Mystery Tales #21, World of Fantasy #11 and Tales of Suspense #9	704	11 Jul 2023	Gil Kane DM cover: 978-1302948788

=== Devil Dinosaur ===
#	Title	Years covered	Material collected	Pages	Released	ISBN
	Devil Dinosaur by Jack Kirby	1978	Devil Dinosaur #1–9	184	11 Jul 2007	Jack Kirby cover: 978-0785126942

=== Doctor Doom ===
#	Title	Years covered	Material collected	Pages	Released	ISBN
	Doctor Doom: The Book of Doom	1962-2006	Fantastic Four (1961) #5–6, 39–40, 246–247, 258, 278–279, 350, 352; Amazing Spider-Man #5 & Annual #14; Marvel Super-Heroes #20; Giant-Size Super-Villain Team-Up #1–2; Super-Villain Team-Up #13–14; Champions #16; Uncanny X-Men #145–147; Iron Man #149–150; Marvel Super Heroes Secret Wars #10–12; Marvel Graphic Novel No. 27 – Emperor Doom and No. 49 – Doctor Strange and Doctor Doom: Triumph and Torment; Fantastic Four (1998) #67–70, 500; Fantastic Four Special #1; Books of Doom #1–6; material from Fantastic Four (1961) #236, 358 and Annual #2, Astonishing Tales #1–8 and Marvel Double Shot #2	1,336	16 Aug 2022	Greg Land cover: 978-1302934200
	Doctor Doom: The Book of Doom	1962-2006		1,336	16 Aug 2022	John Byrne DM cover: 978-1302934217

=== Doctor Strange ===
#	Title	Years covered	Material collected	Legacy	Pages	Released	ISBN
Doctor Strange legacy numbering starts at #110, and legacy numbers #112 and #113 don't feature the character
1	Doctor Strange Vol. 1	1963-1966	Material from Strange Tales #110–111, 114–146 and Amazing Spider-Man Annual #2	#110-111, #114-146	456	21 Sep 2016	Alex Ross cover 978-0785199243
1	Doctor Strange Vol. 1	1963-1966	Material from Strange Tales #110–111, 114–146 and Amazing Spider-Man Annual #2	#110-111, #114-146	456	21 Sep 2016	Steve Ditko DM cover: 978-0785199250
1	Doctor Strange Vol. 1	1963-1966	Material from Strange Tales #110–111, 114–146 and Amazing Spider-Man Annual #2	#110-111, #114-146	456	25 Jan 2022	Alex Ross cover: 978-1302932879
1	Doctor Strange Vol. 1	1963-1966	Material from Strange Tales #110–111, 114–146 and Amazing Spider-Man Annual #2	#110-111, #114-146	456	25 Jan 2022	Steve Ditko DM cover: 978-1302932886
2	Doctor Strange Vol. 2	1966-1971	Doctor Strange #169–183; Avengers #61; Sub-Mariner #22; Incredible Hulk #126; material from Strange Tales #147–168; Marvel Feature #1 and Not Brand Echh #13	#147-183	704	25 Jan 2022	Kevin Nowlan cover: 978-1302926632
2	Doctor Strange Vol. 2	1966-1971	Doctor Strange #169–183; Avengers #61; Sub-Mariner #22; Incredible Hulk #126; material from Strange Tales #147–168; Marvel Feature #1 and Not Brand Echh #13	#147-183	704	25 Jan 2022	Dan Adkins DM cover: 978-1302926649
1	Doctor Strange: Master of the Mystic Arts Vol. 1	1972-1977	Marvel Premiere (1972) #3–14, Doctor Strange (1974) #1–22, Doctor Strange Annual (1976) #1, Tomb of Dracula (1972) #44	#184-205	768	11 Mar 2025	Frank Brunner Strange & Clea cover: 978-1302962173
1	Doctor Strange: Master of the Mystic Arts Vol. 1	1972-1977	Marvel Premiere (1972) #3–14, Doctor Strange (1974) #1–22, Doctor Strange Annual (1976) #1, Tomb of Dracula (1972) #44	#184-205	768	11 Mar 2025	Frank Brunner First Issue DM cover: 978-1302962180
1	Doctor Strange: Sorcerer Supreme Vol. 1	1988-1992	Doctor Strange: Sorcerer Supreme #1–40; Ghost Rider (vol. 3) #12	#265-304	1,064	5 Jul 2017	Gene Colan cover: 978-1302907075
2	Doctor Strange: Sorcerer Supreme Vol. 2	1992-1993	Doctor Strange: Sorcerer Supreme #41–59, Annual #2–3; Spider-Man/Dr. Strange: The Way to Dusty Death; Silver Surfer (vol. 3) #67; Morbius the Living Vampire (vol. 1) #9; Secret Defenders #1–11; material from Incredible Hulk Annual #18; Namor the Sub-Mariner Annual #2 and Silver Surfer Annual #5	#305-323	1,056	4 Jul 2018	Geof Isherwood cover: 978-1302911782
3	Doctor Strange: Sorcerer Supreme Vol. 3	1993-1998	Doctor Strange: Sorcerer Supreme #60–90, Annual #4; Strange Tales (vol. 3) #1; Midnight Sons Unlimited #6; Dr Strange: What Is It That Disturbs You, Stephen?; Untold Tales of Spider-Man: Strange Encounter; Doctor Strange, Sorcerer Supreme Ashcan Edition #1	#324-354	1,088	26 Apr 2022	Peter Gross cover: 978-1302930448
3	Doctor Strange: Sorcerer Supreme Vol. 3	1993-1998	Doctor Strange: Sorcerer Supreme #60–90, Annual #4; Strange Tales (vol. 3) #1; Midnight Sons Unlimited #6; Dr Strange: What Is It That Disturbs You, Stephen?; Untold Tales of Spider-Man: Strange Encounter; Doctor Strange, Sorcerer Supreme Ashcan Edition #1	#324-354	1,088	26 Apr 2022	Mark Buckingham DM cover: 978-1302930455
	Doctor Strange by Aaron & Bachalo	2015-2017	Doctor Strange (2015) #1–20, Annual #1; Doctor Strange: Last Days of Magic #1	#355-374	576	12 Apr 2022	Chris Bachalo cover: 978-1302933487
	Doctor Strange by Aaron & Bachalo	2015-2017	Doctor Strange (2015) #1–20, Annual #1; Doctor Strange: Last Days of Magic #1	#355-374	576	12 Apr 2022	Mike Perkins DM cover: 978-1302933494
	Doctor Strange by Jed MacKay	2021-2024	Death of Doctor Strange #1-5; Death of Doctor Strange: Spider-Man; Strange #1-10; Doctor Strange (2023) #1-18	#417-444	832	23 Sep 2025	Alex Ross cover: 978-1302964757
	Doctor Strange by Jed MacKay	2021-2024	Death of Doctor Strange #1-5; Death of Doctor Strange: Spider-Man; Strange #1-10; Doctor Strange (2023) #1-18	#417-444	832	23 Sep 2025	Stephanie Hans DM cover: 978-1302964764
Jump to: Strange Academy

=== Elektra ===
Title	Years covered	Material collected	Pages	Released	ISBN
Elektra by Frank Miller & Bill Sienkiewicz	1980-1987	Elektra: Assassin #1–8; Elektra Lives Again; material from Bizarre Adventures #28, What If...? #35	384	22 Oct 2008	Frank Miller red/white cover: 978-0785127772
Elektra by Frank Miller & Bill Sienkiewicz	1980-1987	Elektra: Assassin #1–8; Elektra Lives Again; material from Bizarre Adventures #28, What If...? #35	384	22 Oct 2008	Bill Sienkiewicz DM cover: 978-0785131366
Elektra by Frank Miller & Bill Sienkiewicz	1980-1987	Elektra: Assassin #1–8; Elektra Lives Again; material from Bizarre Adventures #28, What If...? #35	384	2 Mar 2016	Frank Miller red/white cover: 978-0785195566

=== Eternals ===
#	Title	Years covered	Material collected	Pages	Released	ISBN
	Eternals by Jack Kirby	1976-1977	The Eternals #1–19, Annual #1	392	12 Jul 2006	Jack Kirby cover: 978-0785122050
	The Eternals: The Complete Saga	1976-2000	Eternals (1976) #1–19, Annual #1; Eternals (1985) #1–12; Eternals: The Herod Factor (1991) #1; New Eternals: Apocalypse Now (2000) #1; Iron Man Annual (1971) #6; Avengers (1963) #246–248; material from What If? (1977) #23–30	1,120	15 Dec 2020	Alex Ross cover: 978-1302922467
	The Eternals: The Complete Saga	1976-2000	Eternals (1976) #1–19, Annual #1; Eternals (1985) #1–12; Eternals: The Herod Factor (1991) #1; New Eternals: Apocalypse Now (2000) #1; Iron Man Annual (1971) #6; Avengers (1963) #246–248; material from What If? (1977) #23–30	1,120	15 Dec 2020	Jack Kirby DM cover: 978-1302922474

=== Excalibur ===
#	Title	Years covered	Material collected	Pages	Released	ISBN
1	Excalibur Vol. 1	1988-1991	Excalibur Special Edition (1988) #1; Excalibur (1988) #1–34; Excalibur: Mojo Mayhem (1989) #1; Quasar (1989) #11; Thor (1966) #427–429; material from Marvel Comics Presents (1988) #31–38	1,136	1 Dec 2020	Alan Davis First Issue cover: 978-1302926663
1	Excalibur Vol. 1	1988-1991	Excalibur Special Edition (1988) #1; Excalibur (1988) #1–34; Excalibur: Mojo Mayhem (1989) #1; Quasar (1989) #11; Thor (1966) #427–429; material from Marvel Comics Presents (1988) #31–38	1,136	1 Dec 2020	Alan Davis Marvel Age DM cover: 978-1302926670
2	Excalibur Vol. 2	1991-1993	Excalibur (1988) #35–67; Excalibur: Weird World III (1990) #1; Excalibur: The Possession (1991) #1; Excalibur: Air Apparent (1991) #1; Excalibur: XX Crossing (1992) #1; Sensational She-Hulk (1989) #26; material from Marvel Comics Presents (1988) #75, 110	1,080	8 Feb 2022	Alan Davis cover: 978-1302932282
2	Excalibur Vol. 2	1991-1993	Excalibur (1988) #35–67; Excalibur: Weird World III (1990) #1; Excalibur: The Possession (1991) #1; Excalibur: Air Apparent (1991) #1; Excalibur: XX Crossing (1992) #1; Sensational She-Hulk (1989) #26; material from Marvel Comics Presents (1988) #75, 110	1,080	8 Feb 2022	Joe Madureira DM cover: 978-1302932299
3	Excalibur Vol. 3	1993-1996	Excalibur (1988) #68–103, Annual (1993) #1–2; X-Men Unlimited (1993) #4; X-Factor (1986) #106; X-Force (1991) #38; X-Man (1995) #12; Pryde and Wisdom (1996) #1–3; material from Marvel Comics Presents (1988) #174 and Marvel Holiday Special 1996	1,304	10 Sep 2024	Anthony Winn cover: 978-1302953737
3	Excalibur Vol. 3	1993-1996	Excalibur (1988) #68–103, Annual (1993) #1–2; X-Men Unlimited (1993) #4; X-Factor (1986) #106; X-Force (1991) #38; X-Man (1995) #12; Pryde and Wisdom (1996) #1–3; material from Marvel Comics Presents (1988) #174 and Marvel Holiday Special 1996	1,304	10 Sep 2024	Joe Madureira DM cover: 978-1302953744
4	Excalibur Vol. 4	1996-2001	Excalibur (1988) #104–125, -1; Colossus (1997) #1; Kitty Pryde: Agent of S.H.I.E.L.D. (1997) #1–3; New Mutants: Truth Or Death (1997) #1-3, X-Men Unlimited (1993) #19; X-Men: True Friends (1999) #1-3; Excalibur (2001) #1-4	1,024	24 Feb 2026	Salvador Larroca cover: 978-1302965426
4	Excalibur Vol. 4	1996-2001	Excalibur (1988) #104–125, -1; Colossus (1997) #1; Kitty Pryde: Agent of S.H.I.E.L.D. (1997) #1–3; New Mutants: Truth Or Death (1997) #1-3, X-Men Unlimited (1993) #19; X-Men: True Friends (1999) #1-3; Excalibur (2001) #1-4	1,024	24 Feb 2026	Alan Davis DM cover: 978-1302965433

=== Fantastic Four ===
#	Title	Years covered	Material collected	Legacy	Pages	Released	ISBN
1	Fantastic Four Vol. 1	1961-1964	Fantastic Four #1–30, Annual #1	#1-30	848	22 Jun 2005	Jack Kirby cover: 978-0785118701
1	Fantastic Four Vol. 1	1961-1964	Fantastic Four #1–30, Annual #1	#1-30	848	22 Jun 2005	Alex Ross DM cover: 978-0785118923
1	Fantastic Four Vol. 1	1961-1964	Fantastic Four #1–30, Annual #1	#1-30	848	2 Oct 2013	Jack Kirby cover: 978-0785185666
1	Fantastic Four Vol. 1	1961-1964	Fantastic Four #1–30, Annual #1	#1-30	848	29 Aug 2018	Jack Kirby cover: 978-1302913274
1	Fantastic Four Vol. 1	1961-1964	Includes original letters pages, etc.	#1-30	928	20 May 2025	Alex Ross cover: 978-1302963682
1	Fantastic Four Vol. 1	1961-1964	Includes original letters pages, etc.	#1-30	928	20 May 2025	Jack Kirby DM cover: 978-1302963699
2	Fantastic Four Vol. 2	1964-1967	Fantastic Four #31–60, Annual #2–4; material from Not Brand Echh #1	#31-60	832	13 Jun 2007	Jack Kirby cover: 978-0785124030
2	Fantastic Four Vol. 2	1964-1967	Fantastic Four #31–60, Annual #2–4; material from Not Brand Echh #1	#31-60	832	13 Jun 2007	Jose Ladronn DM cover: 978-0785125105
2	Fantastic Four Vol. 2	1964-1967	Fantastic Four #31–60, Annual #2–4; material from Not Brand Echh #1	#31-60	832	4 Dec 2013	Jack Kirby cover: 978-0785185673
2	Fantastic Four Vol. 2	1964-1967	Fantastic Four #31–60, Annual #2–4; material from Not Brand Echh #1	#31-60	832	14 Jul 2021	Jack Kirby cover: 978-1302930578
2	Fantastic Four Vol. 2	1964-1967	Fantastic Four #31–60, Annual #2–4; material from Not Brand Echh #1	#31-60	832	14 Jul 2021	Jose Ladronn DM cover: 978-1302930585
3	Fantastic Four Vol. 3	1967-1969	Fantastic Four #61–93, Annual #5–7; material from Not Brand Echh #5–7	#61-93	952	29 Apr 2015	Alex Ross cover: 978-0785191742
3	Fantastic Four Vol. 3	1967-1969	Fantastic Four #61–93, Annual #5–7; material from Not Brand Echh #5–7	#61-93	952	29 Apr 2015	Jack Kirby DM cover: 978-0785191759
3	Fantastic Four Vol. 3	1967-1969	Fantastic Four #61–93, Annual #5–7; material from Not Brand Echh #5–7	#61-93	952	28 Jul 2021	Alex Ross cover: 978-1302930592
3	Fantastic Four Vol. 3	1967-1969	Fantastic Four #61–93, Annual #5–7; material from Not Brand Echh #5–7	#61-93	952	28 Jul 2021	Jack Kirby DM cover: 978-1302930608
4	Fantastic Four Vol. 4	1969-1972	Fantastic Four #94–125, Fantastic Four: The Lost Adventure	#94-125	816	7 Sep 2021	Arthur Adams cover: 978-1302930509
4	Fantastic Four Vol. 4	1969-1972	Fantastic Four #94–125, Fantastic Four: The Lost Adventure	#94-125	816	7 Sep 2021	Jack Kirby DM cover: 978-1302930516
5	Fantastic Four Vol. 5	1972-1975	Fantastic Four (1961) #126–163, Giant-Size Super-Stars (1974) #1, Giant-Size Fantastic Four (1974) #2–4, Avengers (1963) #127	#126-163	1,008	19 Nov 2024	Rich Buckler Thing vs. Sinister Six cover: 978-1302955526
5	Fantastic Four Vol. 5	1972-1975	Fantastic Four (1961) #126–163, Giant-Size Super-Stars (1974) #1, Giant-Size Fantastic Four (1974) #2–4, Avengers (1963) #127	#126-163	1,008	19 Nov 2024	Rich Buckler Thing vs. Hulk DM cover: 978-1302955533
6	Fantastic Four Vol. 6	1975-1978	Fantastic Four (1961) #164–203, Annual (1963) #11-13; Marvel Two-in-One (1974) #20, Annual (1976) #1; What If? (1977) #1, 6, 11	#164-203	1,072	11 Jun 2025	Jack Kirby cover: 978-1302962333
6	Fantastic Four Vol. 6	1975-1978	Fantastic Four (1961) #164–203, Annual (1963) #11-13; Marvel Two-in-One (1974) #20, Annual (1976) #1; What If? (1977) #1, 6, 11	#164-203	1,072	11 Jun 2025	George Perez DM cover: 978-1302962340
1	Fantastic Four by John Byrne Vol. 1	1977-1983	Marvel Team-Up #61–62; Marvel Two-in-One #50; Fantastic Four #209–218, 220–221, 232–260, Annual #17; Avengers #233; The Thing #2	#209-260	1,096	9 Nov 2011	John Byrne Anniversary cover: 978-0785158240
1	Fantastic Four by John Byrne Vol. 1	1977-1983	Marvel Team-Up #61–62; Marvel Two-in-One #50; Fantastic Four #209–218, 220–221, 232–260, Annual #17; Avengers #233; The Thing #2	#209-260	1,096	9 Nov 2011	John Byrne Pin-Up DM cover: 978-0785158257
1	Fantastic Four by John Byrne Vol. 1	1977-1983	Marvel Team-Up #61–62; Marvel Two-in-One #50; Fantastic Four #209–218, 220–221, 232–260, Annual #17; Avengers #233; The Thing #2	#209-260	1,096	29 Aug 2018	John Byrne Anniversary cover: 978-1302913281
1	Fantastic Four by John Byrne Vol. 1	1977-1983	Marvel Team-Up #61–62; Marvel Two-in-One #50; Fantastic Four #209–218, 220–221, 232–260, Annual #17; Avengers #233; The Thing #2	#209-260	1,096	25 Oct 2022	John Byrne Anniversary cover: 978-1302946333
1	Fantastic Four by John Byrne Vol. 1	1977-1983	Marvel Team-Up #61–62; Marvel Two-in-One #50; Fantastic Four #209–218, 220–221, 232–260, Annual #17; Avengers #233; The Thing #2	#209-260	1,096	25 Oct 2022	John Byrne Pin-Up DM cover: 978-1302946340
2	Fantastic Four by John Byrne Vol. 2	1982-1986	Fantastic Four #261–295, Annual #18–19; Alpha Flight #4; The Thing #10, 19; Avengers Annual #14; material from Secret Wars II #2, Epic Illustrated #26–34, What If? #36, What The-?! #2, 10, The Thing #7, Fantastic Four Roast and Fantastic Four Special Edition	#261-295	1,224	4 Dec 2013	John Byrne Infinity cover: 978-0785185437
2	Fantastic Four by John Byrne Vol. 2	1982-1986	Fantastic Four #261–295, Annual #18–19; Alpha Flight #4; The Thing #10, 19; Avengers Annual #14; material from Secret Wars II #2, Epic Illustrated #26–34, What If? #36, What The-?! #2, 10, The Thing #7, Fantastic Four Roast and Fantastic Four Special Edition	#261-295	1,224	4 Dec 2013	John Byrne Corner Box DM cover: 978-0785185703
2	Fantastic Four by John Byrne Vol. 2	1982-1986	Fantastic Four #261–295, Annual #18–19; Alpha Flight #4; The Thing #10, 19; Avengers Annual #14; material from Secret Wars II #2, Epic Illustrated #26–34, What If? #36, What The-?! #2, 10, The Thing #7, Fantastic Four Roast and Fantastic Four Special Edition	#261-295	1,224	24 Jan 2023	John Byrne Infinity cover: 978-1302945565
2	Fantastic Four by John Byrne Vol. 2	1982-1986	Fantastic Four #261–295, Annual #18–19; Alpha Flight #4; The Thing #10, 19; Avengers Annual #14; material from Secret Wars II #2, Epic Illustrated #26–34, What If? #36, What The-?! #2, 10, The Thing #7, Fantastic Four Roast and Fantastic Four Special Edition	#261-295	1,224	24 Jan 2023	John Byrne Corner Box DM cover: 978-1302945565
	Fantastic Four by Waid & Wieringo	2002-2005	Fantastic Four (vol. 3) #60–70, 500–524, 500 Director's Cut	#489-524	896	5 Dec 2018	Mike Wieringo cover: 978-1302913823
	Fantastic Four by Waid & Wieringo	2002-2005	Fantastic Four (vol. 3) #60–70, 500–524, 500 Director's Cut	#489-524	896	4 Jun 2024	Mike Wieringo Team cover: 978-1302957698
	Fantastic Four by Waid & Wieringo	2002-2005	Fantastic Four (vol. 3) #60–70, 500–524, 500 Director's Cut	#489-524	896	4 Jun 2024	Mike Wieringo Thing DM cover: 978-1302957704
	Fantastic Four by Millar & Hitch	2007-2009	Fantastic Four #554–569, Annual #32; Fantastic Force (2009) #1–4; Marvel 1985 #1–6	#554-569	784	25 Apr 2023	Bryan Hitch cover: 978-1302949716
	Fantastic Four by Millar & Hitch	2007-2009	Fantastic Four #554–569, Annual #32; Fantastic Force (2009) #1–4; Marvel 1985 #1–6	#554-569	784	25 Apr 2023	Marc Silvestri DM cover: 978-1302949723
1	Fantastic Four by Jonathan Hickman Vol. 1	2009-2011	Dark Reign: Fantastic Four #1–5; Dark Reign: The Cabal #1; Fantastic Four #570–588; FF #1–5	#570-593	800	2 Oct 2013	Alan Davis cover: 978-0785165668
1	Fantastic Four by Jonathan Hickman Vol. 1	2009-2011	Dark Reign: Fantastic Four #1–5; Dark Reign: The Cabal #1; Fantastic Four #570–588; FF #1–5	#570-593	800	15 Mar 2022	Alan Davis First Issue cover: 978-1302932404
1	Fantastic Four by Jonathan Hickman Vol. 1	2009-2011	Dark Reign: Fantastic Four #1–5; Dark Reign: The Cabal #1; Fantastic Four #570–588; FF #1–5	#570-593	800	15 Mar 2022	Alan Davis Final Issue DM cover: 978-1302932411
2	Fantastic Four by Jonathan Hickman Vol. 2	2011-2012	FF #6–23; Fantastic Four #600–611, 605.1	#594-611	832	18 Nov 2014	Gabriele Dell'Otto cover: 0785189009
2	Fantastic Four by Jonathan Hickman Vol. 2	2011-2012	FF #6–23; Fantastic Four #600–611, 605.1	#594-611	832	12 Apr 2022	Gabriele Dell'Otto cover: 978-1302933845
2	Fantastic Four by Jonathan Hickman Vol. 2	2011-2012	FF #6–23; Fantastic Four #600–611, 605.1	#594-611	832	12 Apr 2022	Giuseppe Camuncoli DM cover: 978-1302933852
	Fantastic Four by Matt Fraction	2012-2014	Fantastic Four (vol. 4) #1–16, 5AU; FF (vol. 2) #1–16; material from Marvel NOW! Point One #1	#612-627	760	4 Feb 2015	Mark Bagley cover: 978-0785191100
1	Fantastic Four by Dan Slott Vol. 1	2018-2020	Fantastic Four (vol. 6) #1–11, #12 (A-story), #13-24; Fantastic Four Wedding Special; Empyre: Fantastic Four; Empyre Fallout: Fantastic Four; Fantastic Four: 4 Yancy Street; Fantastic Four: Negative Zone; Fantastic Four: Grimm Noir	#646-669	832	2 Jun 2026	Esad Ribić cover: 978-1302961206
1	Fantastic Four by Dan Slott Vol. 1	2018-2020	Fantastic Four (vol. 6) #1–11, #12 (A-story), #13-24; Fantastic Four Wedding Special; Empyre: Fantastic Four; Empyre Fallout: Fantastic Four; Fantastic Four: 4 Yancy Street; Fantastic Four: Negative Zone; Fantastic Four: Grimm Noir	#646-669	832	2 Jun 2026	Alex Ross DM cover: 978-1302961213
2	Fantastic Four by Dan Slott Vol. 2	2020-2022	Fantastic Four (vol. 6) #25-48; Fantastic Four: Reckoning War Alpha; Reckoning War: Trial of the Watcher; Fantastic Four: Road Trip	#670-693	784	1 Dec 2026	Mark Brooks cover: 978-1302961220
2	Fantastic Four by Dan Slott Vol. 2	2020-2022	Fantastic Four (vol. 6) #25-48; Fantastic Four: Reckoning War Alpha; Reckoning War: Trial of the Watcher; Fantastic Four: Road Trip	#670-693	784	1 Dec 2026	CAFU DM cover: 978-1302961237
Jump to: Ultimate Fantastic Four
Jump to: Fantastic Four 2099
Jump to: The Thing

=== Ghost Rider ===
==== Cosmic Ghost Rider ====
#	Title	Years covered	Material collected	Pages	Released	ISBN
1	Cosmic Ghost Rider Vol. 1	2017-2021	Thanos (2016) #13–18, Annual #1; Cosmic Ghost Rider #1–5; Cosmic Ghost Rider Destroys Marvel History #1–6; Guardians of the Galaxy (2019) #1–6; Avengers (2018) #22–25; Revenge of the Cosmic Ghost Rider #1–5; material from Thanos: Legacy #1 and Wolverine Black, White & Blood #3	848	8 Sep 2021	Scott Campbell cover: 978-1302929633
1	Cosmic Ghost Rider Vol. 1	2017-2021	Thanos (2016) #13–18, Annual #1; Cosmic Ghost Rider #1–5; Cosmic Ghost Rider Destroys Marvel History #1–6; Guardians of the Galaxy (2019) #1–6; Avengers (2018) #22–25; Revenge of the Cosmic Ghost Rider #1–5; material from Thanos: Legacy #1 and Wolverine Black, White & Blood #3	848	8 Sep 2021	Geoff Shaw DM cover: 978-1302929640

==== Ghost Rider ====
#	Title	Years covered	Material collected	Legacy	Pages	Released	ISBN
1	Ghost Rider: Danny Ketch Vol. 1	1990-1992	Ghost Rider (1990) #1–24; Spider-Man (1990) #6–7; Marc Spector: Moon Knight (1989) #25; Doctor Strange, Sorcerer Supreme (1988) #28; Punisher War Journal (1988) #29–30; Ghost Rider/Wolverine/Punisher: Hearts of Darkness (1991) #1; material from Marvel Comics Presents (1988) #64–71, 90–118; Marvel Holiday Special (1991) #1	#82-105	1,216	3 Sep 2024	Mark Texeira cover: 978-1302959753
1	Ghost Rider: Danny Ketch Vol. 1	1990-1992	Ghost Rider (1990) #1–24; Spider-Man (1990) #6–7; Marc Spector: Moon Knight (1989) #25; Doctor Strange, Sorcerer Supreme (1988) #28; Punisher War Journal (1988) #29–30; Ghost Rider/Wolverine/Punisher: Hearts of Darkness (1991) #1; material from Marvel Comics Presents (1988) #64–71, 90–118; Marvel Holiday Special (1991) #1	#82-105	1,216	3 Sep 2024	Javier Saltares DM cover: 978-1302959760
2	Ghost Rider: Danny Ketch Vol. 2	1992-1993	Ghost Rider (1990) #25-40; Ghost Rider/Blaze: Spirits of Vengeance #1-13; Morbius: The Living Vampire #1, 12; Darkhold: Pages from the Book of Sins #1, 11; Nightstalkers #1, 10; Ghost Rider/Captain America: Fear; X-Men (1991) #9; Web of Spider-Man #95-96; Midnight Sons Unlimited #3; material from Marvel Comics Presents #119-130; Midnight Sons Unlimited #1-2; Marvel Holiday Special #3	#106-121	1,312	14 Oct 2025	Adam Kubert cover: 978-1302965440
2	Ghost Rider: Danny Ketch Vol. 2	1992-1993	Ghost Rider (1990) #25-40; Ghost Rider/Blaze: Spirits of Vengeance #1-13; Morbius: The Living Vampire #1, 12; Darkhold: Pages from the Book of Sins #1, 11; Nightstalkers #1, 10; Ghost Rider/Captain America: Fear; X-Men (1991) #9; Web of Spider-Man #95-96; Midnight Sons Unlimited #3; material from Marvel Comics Presents #119-130; Midnight Sons Unlimited #1-2; Marvel Holiday Special #3	#106-121	1,312	14 Oct 2025	Jim Lee DM cover: 978-1302965457
3	Ghost Rider: Danny Ketch Vol. 3	1993-1994	Ghost Rider (1990) #41-50, Annual (1993) #1; Ghost Rider/Blaze: Spirits of Vengeance (1992) #14-23; Nightstalkers (1992) #14-15; Marvel Comics Presents (1988) #143-146; Darkhold: Pages from the Book of Sins (1992) #15-16; Morbius: The Living Vampire (1992) #16-17; Doctor Strange, Sorcerer Supreme (1988) #60-61; Midnight Sons Unlimited (1993) #4; Blaze: Legacy of Blood (1993) #1-4; Ghost Rider and the Midnight Sons Magazine (1993) #1; material from Marvel Comics Presents (1988) #131-142	#122-131	1,232	5 Jan 2027	Henry Martinez cover: 978-1302970161
3	Ghost Rider: Danny Ketch Vol. 3	1993-1994	Ghost Rider (1990) #41-50, Annual (1993) #1; Ghost Rider/Blaze: Spirits of Vengeance (1992) #14-23; Nightstalkers (1992) #14-15; Marvel Comics Presents (1988) #143-146; Darkhold: Pages from the Book of Sins (1992) #15-16; Morbius: The Living Vampire (1992) #16-17; Doctor Strange, Sorcerer Supreme (1988) #60-61; Midnight Sons Unlimited (1993) #4; Blaze: Legacy of Blood (1993) #1-4; Ghost Rider and the Midnight Sons Magazine (1993) #1; material from Marvel Comics Presents (1988) #131-142	#122-131	1,232	5 Jan 2027	Ron Garney DM cover: 978-1302970178
	Ghost Rider by Jason Aaron	2008-2010	Ghost Rider (2006) #20–35; Ghost Riders: Heaven's on Fire #1–6	#194-209	536	6 Oct 2010	Marc Silvestri cover: 978-0785143673
	Ghost Rider by Jason Aaron	2008-2010	Ghost Rider (2006) #20–35; Ghost Riders: Heaven's on Fire #1–6	#194-209	536	3 Apr 2024	Marc Silvestri cover: 978-1302957599
	Ghost Rider by Jason Aaron	2008-2010	Ghost Rider (2006) #20–35; Ghost Riders: Heaven's on Fire #1–6	#194-209	536	3 Apr 2024	Greg Land DM cover: 978-1302957605
	Ghost Rider by Benjamin Percy	2022-2024	Ghost Rider (2022) #1-13, #14 (A-story), #15-19, #20 (A-story), #21; Ghost Rider/Wolverine: Weapons of Vengeance Alpha; Wolverine (2020) #36; Ghost Rider/Wolverine: Weapons of Vengeance Omega; Ghost Rider: Final Vengeance #1-6; Ghost Rider: Vengeance Forever; Ghost Rider Annual (2023)	#244-270	832	13 Oct 2026	Kael Ngu cover: 978-1302966676
	Ghost Rider by Benjamin Percy	2022-2024	Ghost Rider (2022) #1-13, #14 (A-story), #15-19, #20 (A-story), #21; Ghost Rider/Wolverine: Weapons of Vengeance Alpha; Wolverine (2020) #36; Ghost Rider/Wolverine: Weapons of Vengeance Omega; Ghost Rider: Final Vengeance #1-6; Ghost Rider: Vengeance Forever; Ghost Rider Annual (2023)	#244-270	832	13 Oct 2026	Ryan Stegman DM cover: 978-1302966683

=== Godzilla ===
Marvel Comics held the rights to publish Godzilla comics for two years from 1977. The series ended after 24 monthly issues, when copyright holder Toho "asked for a large increase to its license fee after the first year of the series, and an even larger increase after the second year". In 2024, "thanks to an exciting new collaboration with Toho International", Marvel released the full run in a single omnibus.

Even though Godzilla is licensed, S.H.I.E.L.D. play a large part throughout the series, with Fantastic Four and the Avengers appearing from issue #20.

#	Title	Years covered	Material collected	Pages	Released	ISBN
	Godzilla: The Original Marvel Years	1977-1979	Godzilla (1977) #1–24	440	1 Oct 2024	Junggeun Yoon cover: 978-1302958756
	Godzilla: The Original Marvel Years	1977-1979	Godzilla (1977) #1–24	440	1 Oct 2024	Herb Trimpe First Issue DM cover: 978-1302958763
	Godzilla: The Original Marvel Years	1977-1979	Godzilla (1977) #1–24	440	1 Oct 2024	Herb Trimpe War of the Giants DM cover: 978-1302959722

=== Guardians of the Galaxy (Bronze Age Team) ===
#	Title	Years covered	Material collected	Legacy	Pages	Released	ISBN
	Guardians of the Galaxy: Tomorrow's Heroes	1968-1980	Marvel Super-Heroes #18; Marvel Two-in-One #4–5, 61–63, 69; Giant-Size Defenders #5; Defenders #26–29; Marvel Presents #3–12; Thor Annual #6; Avengers #167–168, 170–177, 181; Ms. Marvel #23; Marvel Team-Up #86		752	2 Jan 2019	John Romita Sr. cover: 978-1302915544
	Guardians of the Galaxy by Jim Valentino	1990-1992	Guardians of the Galaxy (1990) #1–29, Annual #1–2; Marvel Super-Heroes #18; material from Fantastic Four Annual #24; Thor Annual #16 and Silver Surfer Annual #4	#1-29	984	1 Mar 2017	Jim Valentino cover: 978-1302904395

=== Guardians of the Galaxy (Modern Team) ===
#	Title	Years covered	Material collected	Legacy	Pages	Released	ISBN
	Guardians of the Galaxy Solo Classic	1972-1986	Incredible Hulk #271, Annual #5; Iron Man #55; Captain Marvel #27–33, 43–44, 58–62; Strange Tales #180–181; Warlock #9–11, 15; Avengers #219–220, Annual #7; Marvel Two-in-One Annual #2; Marvel Preview #11; Marvel Spotlight (vol. 2) #1–2, 6–7; Marvel Premiere #61; Rocket Raccoon #1–4; Star-Lord Special Edition #1; material from Tales to Astonish #13, Logan's Run #6, Marvel Preview #14–15, 18, Marvel Super Special #10		1,122	4 Nov 2015	Alex Ross cover: 978-0785198321
	Guardians of the Galaxy by Abnett and Lanning	2008-2011	Guardians of the Galaxy (2008) #1–25; Thanos Imperative: Ignition #1; Thanos Imperative #1–6; Thanos Imperative: Devastation #1; material from Annihilators #1–4; Annihilators: Earthfall #1–4	#63-87	936	4 May 2016	Alex Garner cover: 978-0785198345
1	Guardians of the Galaxy by Brian Michael Bendis Vol. 1	2012-2015	Avengers Assemble (vol. 2) #1–8; Guardians of the Galaxy (2013) #0.1, 1–27, Annual #1; Guardians of the Galaxy: Tomorrow's Avengers #1; All-New X-Men #22–24; Guardians of Knowhere #1–4; Guardians Team-Up #1–2; material from Free Comic Book Day 2014 (Guardians of the Galaxy)	#88-114	1,168	7 Dec 2016	Leinil Francis Yu cover: 978-1302900274
1	Guardians of the Galaxy by Brian Michael Bendis Vol. 1	2012-2015	Avengers Assemble (vol. 2) #1–8; Guardians of the Galaxy (2013) #0.1, 1–27, Annual #1; Guardians of the Galaxy: Tomorrow's Avengers #1; All-New X-Men #22–24; Guardians of Knowhere #1–4; Guardians Team-Up #1–2; material from Free Comic Book Day 2014 (Guardians of the Galaxy)	#88-114	1,168	28 Feb 2023	Leinil Francis Yu Team cover: 978-1302949778
1	Guardians of the Galaxy by Brian Michael Bendis Vol. 1	2012-2015	Avengers Assemble (vol. 2) #1–8; Guardians of the Galaxy (2013) #0.1, 1–27, Annual #1; Guardians of the Galaxy: Tomorrow's Avengers #1; All-New X-Men #22–24; Guardians of Knowhere #1–4; Guardians Team-Up #1–2; material from Free Comic Book Day 2014 (Guardians of the Galaxy)	#88-114	1,168	28 Feb 2023	Steve McNiven Rocket DM cover: 978-1302949761
1	Guardians of the Galaxy by Brian Michael Bendis Vol. 1	2012-2015	Avengers Assemble (vol. 2) #1–8; Guardians of the Galaxy (2013) #0.1, 1–27, Annual #1; Guardians of the Galaxy: Tomorrow's Avengers #1; All-New X-Men #22–24; Guardians of Knowhere #1–4; Guardians Team-Up #1–2; material from Free Comic Book Day 2014 (Guardians of the Galaxy)	#88-114	1,168	28 Feb 2023	Alex Ross Star-Lord DM cover: 978-1302949754
	Guardians of the Galaxy by Gerry Duggan	2017	All-New Guardians of the Galaxy (2017) #1–12; Guardians of the Galaxy (2018) #146–150; material from FCBD 2017: All-New Guardians of the Galaxy	#134-150	408	26 Sep 2018	Aaron Kuder cover: 978-1302913151

=== Gwenpool ===
#	Title	Years covered	Material collected	Pages	Released	ISBN
	Gwenpool	2015-2019	Unbelievable Gwenpool (2016) #1–25; Rocket Raccoon and Groot (2016) #8–10; Champions (2016) #5; Edge of Venomverse (2017) #2; West Coast Avengers (2018) #1–10; Superior Spider-Man (2018) #7–8; Gwenpool Strikes Back (2019) #1–5; material from Howard the Duck (2015B) #1–3; Gwenpool Special (2015) #1; Gwenpool Holiday Special: Merry Mix-Up (2016) #1; Secret Empire: Brave New World (2017) #1	1,136	20 Dec 2022	Gurihiru Dirt Bike cover: 978-1302948207
	Gwenpool	2015-2019	Unbelievable Gwenpool (2016) #1–25; Rocket Raccoon and Groot (2016) #8–10; Champions (2016) #5; Edge of Venomverse (2017) #2; West Coast Avengers (2018) #1–10; Superior Spider-Man (2018) #7–8; Gwenpool Strikes Back (2019) #1–5; material from Howard the Duck (2015B) #1–3; Gwenpool Special (2015) #1; Gwenpool Holiday Special: Merry Mix-Up (2016) #1; Secret Empire: Brave New World (2017) #1	1,136	20 Dec 2022	Chris Bachalo Pool Lounger DM cover: 978-1302948214
	Gwenpool	2015-2019	Unbelievable Gwenpool (2016) #1–25; Rocket Raccoon and Groot (2016) #8–10; Champions (2016) #5; Edge of Venomverse (2017) #2; West Coast Avengers (2018) #1–10; Superior Spider-Man (2018) #7–8; Gwenpool Strikes Back (2019) #1–5; material from Howard the Duck (2015B) #1–3; Gwenpool Special (2015) #1; Gwenpool Holiday Special: Merry Mix-Up (2016) #1; Secret Empire: Brave New World (2017) #1	1,136	Jan 2027	Gurihiru Dirt Bike cover: TBC
	Gwenpool	2015-2019	Unbelievable Gwenpool (2016) #1–25; Rocket Raccoon and Groot (2016) #8–10; Champions (2016) #5; Edge of Venomverse (2017) #2; West Coast Avengers (2018) #1–10; Superior Spider-Man (2018) #7–8; Gwenpool Strikes Back (2019) #1–5; material from Howard the Duck (2015B) #1–3; Gwenpool Special (2015) #1; Gwenpool Holiday Special: Merry Mix-Up (2016) #1; Secret Empire: Brave New World (2017) #1	1,136	Jan 2027	Chris Bachalo Pool Lounger DM cover: TBC

=== Hawkeye (Clint Barton) ===
#	Title	Years covered	Material collected	Pages	Released	ISBN
	Hawkeye by Fraction & Aja	2008, 2012-2015	Hawkeye (2012) #1–22, Annual (2013) #1; Young Avengers Presents (2008) #6	552	21 Oct 2015	David Aja cover: 978-0785192190
	Hawkeye by Fraction & Aja	2008, 2012-2015	Hawkeye (2012) #1–22, Annual (2013) #1; Young Avengers Presents (2008) #6	552	19 Dec 2023	David Aja cover: 978-1302952822
	Hawkeye by Fraction & Aja	2008, 2012-2015	Hawkeye (2012) #1–22, Annual (2013) #1; Young Avengers Presents (2008) #6	552	19 Dec 2023	Jim Cheung Kate Bishop DM cover: 978-1302952839

=== Hellstorm the Son of Satan ===
#	Title	Years covered	Material collected	Pages	Released	ISBN
	Hellstorm by Warren Ellis	1994-1995	Hellstorm: Prince of Lies #12–21; Druid #1–4	424	3 Oct 2018	Brian Bolland cover: 978-1302913243

=== Howard the Duck ===
#	Title	Years covered	Material collected	Pages	Released	ISBN
	Howard the Duck	1973-1986	Adventure into Fear #19; Man-Thing #1; Giant-Size Man-Thing #4–5; Howard the Duck #1–33, Annual #1; Marvel Treasury Edition #12; Marvel Team-Up #96	808	16 Jul 2008	Marko Djurdjevic Man Thing cover: 978-0785130239
	Howard the Duck	1973-1986	Adventure into Fear #19; Man-Thing #1; Giant-Size Man-Thing #4–5; Howard the Duck #1–33, Annual #1; Marvel Treasury Edition #12; Marvel Team-Up #96	808	16 Jul 2008	Marko Djurdjevic Suit DM cover: 978-0785131434
	Howard the Duck	1973-1986	Adventure into Fear #19; Man-Thing #1; Giant-Size Man-Thing #4–5; Howard the Duck #1–33, Annual #1; Marvel Treasury Edition #12; Marvel Team-Up #96	808	29 Oct 2014	Marko Djurdjevic Man Thing cover: 978-0785130239
	Howard the Duck by Zdarsky & Quinones	2015-2016, 2019	Howard the Duck (2015A) #1–5; Howard the Duck (2015B) #1–11; The Unbeatable Squirrel Girl (2015B) #6; material from The War of the Realms: War Scrolls (2019) #1	464	15 Feb 2022	Joe Quinones cover: 978-1302932015
	Howard the Duck by Zdarsky & Quinones	2015-2016, 2019	Howard the Duck (2015A) #1–5; Howard the Duck (2015B) #1–11; The Unbeatable Squirrel Girl (2015B) #6; material from The War of the Realms: War Scrolls (2019) #1	464	15 Feb 2022	Tradd Moore DM cover: 978-1302932022

=== Hulk ===
#	Title	Years covered	Material collected	Legacy	Pages	Released	ISBN
Hulk legacy numbering starts at #59
1	The Incredible Hulk Vol. 1	1962-1968	The Incredible Hulk #1–6; Tales to Astonish #59–101; The Incredible Hulk (vol. 2) #102	#59-102	752	25 Jun 2008	Jack Kirby cover: 978-0785129387
1	The Incredible Hulk Vol. 1	1962-1968	The Incredible Hulk #1–6; Tales to Astonish #59–101; The Incredible Hulk (vol. 2) #102	#59-102	752	25 Jun 2008	Alex Ross DM cover: 978-0785130567
1	The Incredible Hulk Vol. 1	1962-1968	Material from Not Brand Echh (1967) #3, 9	#59-102	792	9 Mar 2022	Alex Ross cover: 978-1302933869
1	The Incredible Hulk Vol. 1	1962-1968	Material from Not Brand Echh (1967) #3, 9	#59-102	792	9 Mar 2022	Jack Kirby DM cover: 978-1302933876
2	The Incredible Hulk Vol. 2	1968-1970	The Incredible Hulk (vol. 2) #103–134, Annual #1	#103-134	832	21 Nov 2023	Herb Trimpe cover: 978-1302950286
2	The Incredible Hulk Vol. 2	1968-1970	The Incredible Hulk (vol. 2) #103–134, Annual #1	#103-134	832	21 Nov 2023	Jim Steranko DM cover: 978-1302950293
3	The Incredible Hulk Vol. 3	1970-1974	The Incredible Hulk (vol. 2) #135–170; Avengers #88; Marvel Super Heroes #16 (A-story)	#135-170	912	11 Nov 2025	Herb Trimpe Doom cover: 978-1302962593
3	The Incredible Hulk Vol. 3	1970-1974	The Incredible Hulk (vol. 2) #135–170; Avengers #88; Marvel Super Heroes #16 (A-story)	#135-170	912	11 Nov 2025	Herb Trimpe Judge DM cover: 978-1302962609
4	The Incredible Hulk Vol. 4	1974-1977	The Incredible Hulk (vol. 2) #171–209; Annual #5; Material from Marvel Treasury Edition #5	#171-209	880	23 Feb 2027	Rich Buckler Cover: 978-1302971281
4	The Incredible Hulk Vol. 4	1974-1977	The Incredible Hulk (vol. 2) #171–209; Annual #5; Material from Marvel Treasury Edition #5	#171-209	880	23 Feb 2027	Herb Trimpe Wolverine DM Cover: 978-1302971298
1	Incredible Hulk by Peter David Vol. 1	1987-1990	Incredible Hulk (vol. 2) #328, 331–368; Web of Spider-Man #44; Fantastic Four #320; material from Marvel Comics Presents #26, 45	#331-368	1,008	28 Jan 2020	Steve Geiger cover: 978-1302921422
1	Incredible Hulk by Peter David Vol. 1	1987-1990	Incredible Hulk (vol. 2) #328, 331–368; Web of Spider-Man #44; Fantastic Four #320; material from Marvel Comics Presents #26, 45	#331-368	1,008	28 Jan 2020	Steve Geiger Gray Hulk DM cover: 978-1302921552
2	Incredible Hulk by Peter David Vol. 2	1990-1992	Incredible Hulk (vol. 2) #369–400, Annual #16–18; X-Factor #76; material from Marvel Holiday Special (1991) #2	#369-400	1,048	10 Nov 2020	Dale Keown Hulk vs Hulk cover: 978-1302927271
2	Incredible Hulk by Peter David Vol. 2	1990-1992	Incredible Hulk (vol. 2) #369–400, Annual #16–18; X-Factor #76; material from Marvel Holiday Special (1991) #2	#369-400	1,048	10 Nov 2020	Dale Keown Bruce Banner DM cover: 978-1302927288
2	Incredible Hulk by Peter David Vol. 2	1990-1992	Incredible Hulk (vol. 2) #369–400, Annual #16–18; X-Factor #76; material from Marvel Holiday Special (1991) #2	#369-400	1,048	24 Jan 2023	Dale Keown Hulk vs Hulk cover: 978-1302945336
2	Incredible Hulk by Peter David Vol. 2	1990-1992	Incredible Hulk (vol. 2) #369–400, Annual #16–18; X-Factor #76; material from Marvel Holiday Special (1991) #2	#369-400	1,048	24 Jan 2023	Dale Keown Bruce Banner DM cover: 978-1302945329
3	Incredible Hulk by Peter David Vol. 3	1992-1995	Incredible Hulk (vol. 2) #401–435, Annual #19–20; Incredible Hulk vs. Venom #1; Hulk: Future Imperfect #1–2; Tales to Astonish (1994) #1; Incredible Hulk Ashcan Edition; material from Marvel Holiday Special (1991) #3	#401-435	1,200	12 May 2021	Gary Frank Hulk cover: 978-1302929145
3	Incredible Hulk by Peter David Vol. 3	1992-1995	Incredible Hulk (vol. 2) #401–435, Annual #19–20; Incredible Hulk vs. Venom #1; Hulk: Future Imperfect #1–2; Tales to Astonish (1994) #1; Incredible Hulk Ashcan Edition; material from Marvel Holiday Special (1991) #3	#401-435	1,200	12 May 2021	Gary Frank Troyjan War DM cover: 978-1302929152
4	Incredible Hulk by Peter David Vol. 4	1995-1998	Incredible Hulk (vol. 2) #436–467, -1, Annual '97; Savage Hulk (1996) #1; Cutting Edge (1995) #1; Cable (1993) #34; Onslaught: Marvel Universe (1996) #1; Incredible Hulk: Hercules Unleashed (1996) #1; Heroes Reborn: The Return (1997) #1–4	#436-467	1,248	24 May 2022	Mike Deodato cover: 978-1302932916
4	Incredible Hulk by Peter David Vol. 4	1995-1998	Incredible Hulk (vol. 2) #436–467, -1, Annual '97; Savage Hulk (1996) #1; Cutting Edge (1995) #1; Cable (1993) #34; Onslaught: Marvel Universe (1996) #1; Incredible Hulk: Hercules Unleashed (1996) #1; Heroes Reborn: The Return (1997) #1–4	#436-467	1,248	24 May 2022	Adam Kubert DM cover: 978-1302932923
	Hulk: Maestro by Peter David	1992-2022	Hulk: Future Imperfect (1992) #1–2; Abominations (1996) #1–3; Incredible Hulk #460–461; Captain Marvel (1999) #27–30; Exiles (2001) #79–80; Spider-Man 2099 (2014) #9–10; Future Imperfect (2015) #1–5; Maestro (2020) #1–5; Maestro: War and Pax (2021) #1–5; Maestro: World War M (2022) #1–5; material from Hulk: Broken Worlds (2009) #1; Secret Wars: Battleworld (2015) #4	#460-461	960	19 Sep 2023	George Perez cover: 978-1302951139
	Hulk: Maestro by Peter David	1992-2022	Hulk: Future Imperfect (1992) #1–2; Abominations (1996) #1–3; Incredible Hulk #460–461; Captain Marvel (1999) #27–30; Exiles (2001) #79–80; Spider-Man 2099 (2014) #9–10; Future Imperfect (2015) #1–5; Maestro (2020) #1–5; Maestro: War and Pax (2021) #1–5; Maestro: World War M (2022) #1–5; material from Hulk: Broken Worlds (2009) #1; Secret Wars: Battleworld (2015) #4	#460-461	960	19 Sep 2023	Greg Land DM cover: 978-1302951146
	Incredible Hulk by Byrne & Casey	1998-2000	Incredible Hulk #468–474; Hulk #1–11; Hulk & Sub-Mariner Annual '98; X-Man & Hulk Annual '98; Hulk Annual '99; Rampaging Hulk (vol. 2) #1–6	#468-485	768	28 May 2024	Ron Garney cover: 978-1302954062
	Incredible Hulk by Byrne & Casey	1998-2000	Incredible Hulk #468–474; Hulk #1–11; Hulk & Sub-Mariner Annual '98; X-Man & Hulk Annual '98; Hulk Annual '99; Rampaging Hulk (vol. 2) #1–6	#468-485	768	28 May 2024	Lee Weeks DM cover: 978-1302954079
	Incredible Hulk: Return of the Monster	2001-2004	Incredible Hulk (vol. 2) #34-76; Hulk/Wolverine: Six Hours #1-4; Hulk/Thing: Hard Knocks #1-4	#508-550	1,264	5 May 2026	Kaare Andrews cover: 978-1302966478
	Incredible Hulk: Return of the Monster	2001-2004	Incredible Hulk (vol. 2) #34-76; Hulk/Wolverine: Six Hours #1-4; Hulk/Thing: Hard Knocks #1-4	#508-550	1,264	5 May 2026	Mike Deodato Jr. DM cover: 978-1302966485
5	Incredible Hulk by Peter David Vol. 5	2002-2022	Hulk: The End #1; What If General Ross Had Become the Hulk? #1; Incredible Hulk (vol. 2) #77–87; Hulk: Destruction (2005) #1–4; Hulk vs. Fin Fang Foom (2007) #1; Marvel Adventures: Hulk (2007) #13–16; Incredible Hulk: Last Call (2019) #1; Symbiote Spider-Man: Crossroads (2021) #1–5; New Fantastic Four (2022) #1–5; material from Giant-Size Hulk (2006) #1; World War Hulk Prologue: World Breaker (2007) #1; Hulk Monster-Size Special #1; Breaking Into Comics the Marvel Way (2010) #2	#551-561	904	16 May 2023	Lee Weeks cover: 978-1302950965
5	Incredible Hulk by Peter David Vol. 5	2002-2022	Hulk: The End #1; What If General Ross Had Become the Hulk? #1; Incredible Hulk (vol. 2) #77–87; Hulk: Destruction (2005) #1–4; Hulk vs. Fin Fang Foom (2007) #1; Marvel Adventures: Hulk (2007) #13–16; Incredible Hulk: Last Call (2019) #1; Symbiote Spider-Man: Crossroads (2021) #1–5; New Fantastic Four (2022) #1–5; material from Giant-Size Hulk (2006) #1; World War Hulk Prologue: World Breaker (2007) #1; Hulk Monster-Size Special #1; Breaking Into Comics the Marvel Way (2010) #2	#551-561	904	16 May 2023	Dale Keown DM cover: 978-1302950972
	Hulk: Planet Hulk	2005-2007	Fantastic Four #533–535; Incredible Hulk (vol. 2) #88–105; Giant-Size Hulk (2006) #1; What If? Planet Hulk; Planet Hulk Guidebook; material from New Avengers: Illuminati #1; Amazing Fantasy (2004) #15	#562-579	656	19 Sep 2017	Jose Ladronn Portrait cover: 978-1302907693
	Hulk: Planet Hulk	2005-2007	Fantastic Four #533–535; Incredible Hulk (vol. 2) #88–105; Giant-Size Hulk (2006) #1; What If? Planet Hulk; Planet Hulk Guidebook; material from New Avengers: Illuminati #1; Amazing Fantasy (2004) #15	#562-579	656	14 Feb 2023	Jose Ladronn Portrait cover: 978-1302949686
	Hulk: Planet Hulk	2005-2007	Fantastic Four #533–535; Incredible Hulk (vol. 2) #88–105; Giant-Size Hulk (2006) #1; What If? Planet Hulk; Planet Hulk Guidebook; material from New Avengers: Illuminati #1; Amazing Fantasy (2004) #15	#562-579	656	14 Feb 2023	Jose Ladronn Arena DM cover: 978-1302949693
	Hulk: World War Hulk	2007	World War Hulk Prologue: World Breaker; World War Hulk #1–5; Incredible Hulk (vol. 2) #106–111; Iron Man (2005) #19–20; Avengers: The Initiative #4–5; Irredeemable Ant-Man #10; World War Hulk: X-Men #1–3; Ghost Rider (2006) #12–13; Heroes For Hire (2006) #11–15; Punisher War Journal (2007) #12; World War Hulk: Gamma Corps #1–4; World War Hulk: Frontline #1–6; World War Hulk Aftersmash: One-Shot; World War Hulk Aftersmash: Damage Control #1–3; World War Hulk Aftersmash: Warbound #1–5; Planet Hulk Saga	#580-585	1,304	17 Oct 2017	David Finch Throne cover: 978-1302908126
	Hulk: World War Hulk	2007		#580-585	1,304	28 May 2024	David Finch Throne cover: 978-1302957674
	Hulk: World War Hulk	2007		#580-585	1,304	28 May 2024	Michael Turner Earth's Heroes DM cover: 978-1302957681
Hulk legacy number #586 is a Hercules story instead of a Hulk story
	Hulk by Loeb and McGuinness	2007-2011	Hulk (vol. 2) #1–24; King-Size Hulk #1; Fall of the Hulks: Gamma; Hulk-Sized Mini-Hulks; material from Incredible Hulk (vol. 2) #600 and Wolverine (2003) #50	#587-600	912	12 Jun 2019	Ed McGuinness cover: 978-1302918057
	The Immortal Hulk	2018-2021	Immortal Hulk (2018) #1–50; Immortal Hulk: The Best Defense (2018) #1; Defenders: The Best Defense (2018) #1; Absolute Carnage: The Immortal Hulk (2019) #1; Immortal Hulk (2020) #0; Empyre: The Immortal She-Hulk (2020) #1; King in Black: The Immortal Hulk (2020) #1; Gamma Flight (2021) #1–5; Immortal Hulk: Time of Monsters (2021) #1 (A-story); material from Avengers (2018) #684	#718-767	1,616	15 Aug 2023	Alex Ross Chain Breaker cover: 978-1302949976
	The Immortal Hulk	2018-2021	Immortal Hulk (2018) #1–50; Immortal Hulk: The Best Defense (2018) #1; Defenders: The Best Defense (2018) #1; Absolute Carnage: The Immortal Hulk (2019) #1; Immortal Hulk (2020) #0; Empyre: The Immortal She-Hulk (2020) #1; King in Black: The Immortal Hulk (2020) #1; Gamma Flight (2021) #1–5; Immortal Hulk: Time of Monsters (2021) #1 (A-story); material from Avengers (2018) #684	#718-767	1,616	15 Aug 2023	Alex Ross Portrait DM cover: 978-1302950620
	Hulk by Cates & Ottley	2021-2023	Hulk (vol. 6) #1–14; FCBD 2021: Avengers/Hulk (Hulk story); Hulk vs. Thor: Banner of War Alpha (2022) #1; Thor (2020) #25 (A-story), 26	#768-781	424	12 Nov 2024	Ryan Ottley Claw cover: 978-1302958558
	Hulk by Cates & Ottley	2021-2023	Hulk (vol. 6) #1–14; FCBD 2021: Avengers/Hulk (Hulk story); Hulk vs. Thor: Banner of War Alpha (2022) #1; Thor (2020) #25 (A-story), 26	#768-781	424	12 Nov 2024	Ryan Ottley Smash DM cover: 978-1302958572

=== The Human Torch (Golden Age) ===
#	Title	Years covered	Material collected	Pages	Released	ISBN
	Timely's Greatest: The Golden Age Human Torch by Carl Burgos	1939-1954	Material from Marvel Comics #1; Marvel Mystery Comics #2–34, 83; Human Torch #2–7, 28; All-Winners Comics #1–4; Daring Mystery Comics #7; Captain America Comics #76; Young Men #24–28	1,032	10 Dec 2019	Carl Burgos cover: 978-1302919337

=== The Invaders ===
#	Title	Years covered	Material collected	Pages	Released	ISBN
	Invaders	1975-1979, 1943-1969, 1993	Invaders (1975) #1-19, 22-23, 25-41, Annual (1977) #1; Marvel Premiere (1972) #29–30; Avengers (1963) #71; Invaders (1993) #1–4; What If? (1977) #4; material from Captain America Comics (1941) #22; Giant-Size Invaders (1975) #1–2; Invaders (1975) #20-21 (Note: Despite being advertised as containing the complete Giant-Size Invaders (1975) #1 and Invaders (1975) #1-41, the published volume omits almost all the Golden Age material originally included in these issues, i.e., Sub-Mariner (1941) #1, Marvel Comics (1939) #1 and Marvel Mystery Comics (1939) #10, 17)	1,152	8 Nov 2022	Frank Robbins cover: 978-1302934750
	Invaders	1975-1979, 1943-1969, 1993	Invaders (1975) #1-19, 22-23, 25-41, Annual (1977) #1; Marvel Premiere (1972) #29–30; Avengers (1963) #71; Invaders (1993) #1–4; What If? (1977) #4; material from Captain America Comics (1941) #22; Giant-Size Invaders (1975) #1–2; Invaders (1975) #20-21	1,152	8 Nov 2022	Gil Kane DM cover: 978-1302934774
	Invaders	1975-1979, 1943-1969, 1993	Invaders (1975) #1-19, 22-23, 25-41, Annual (1977) #1; Marvel Premiere (1972) #29–30; Avengers (1963) #71; Invaders (1993) #1–4; What If? (1977) #4; material from Captain America Comics (1941) #22; Giant-Size Invaders (1975) #1–2; Invaders (1975) #20-21	1,152	8 Nov 2022	Jack Kirby DM cover: 978-1302934767

=== Iron Fist ===
#	Title	Years covered	Material collected	Legacy	Pages	Released	ISBN
	Iron Fist: Danny Rand – The Early Years	1974-1981	Marvel Premiere #15–25, Iron Fist #1–15, Marvel Team-Up #63–64; material from Deadly Hands of Kung Fu #10, 18–24, 29, 31–33 and Special; Bizarre Adventures #25	#1-15	952	30 Jan 2024	Gil Kane cover: 978-1302954857
	Iron Fist: Danny Rand – The Early Years	1974-1981	Marvel Premiere #15–25, Iron Fist #1–15, Marvel Team-Up #63–64; material from Deadly Hands of Kung Fu #10, 18–24, 29, 31–33 and Special; Bizarre Adventures #25	#1-15	952	30 Jan 2024	Dave Cockrum DM cover: 978-1302954864
	Immortal Iron Fist By Matt Fraction, Ed Brubaker & David Aja	2006-2008	Immortal Iron Fist #1–16, Annual; Immortal Iron Fist: Orson Randall and the Green Mist of Death; Immortal Iron Fist: The Origin of Danny Rand; Civil War: Choosing Sides (C-story)	#27-42	560	1 Jul 2009	David Aja cover: 978-0785138198
	Immortal Iron Fist & the Immortal Weapons	2006-2010	Immortal Iron Fist #1–27, Annual; Immortal Iron Fist: Orson Randall and the Green Mist of Death; Immortal Iron Fist: The Origin of Danny Rand; Immortal Iron Fist: Orson Randall and the Death Queen of California; Immortal Weapons #1–5; Immortal Weapons Sketchbook; Civil War: Choosing Sides (C-story); I Am An Avenger #1 (B-story)	#27-53	1,056	28 Feb 2023	David Aja cover: 978-1302946371
	Immortal Iron Fist & the Immortal Weapons	2006-2010	Immortal Iron Fist #1–27, Annual; Immortal Iron Fist: Orson Randall and the Green Mist of Death; Immortal Iron Fist: The Origin of Danny Rand; Immortal Iron Fist: Orson Randall and the Death Queen of California; Immortal Weapons #1–5; Immortal Weapons Sketchbook; Civil War: Choosing Sides (C-story); I Am An Avenger #1 (B-story)	#27-53	1,056	28 Feb 2023	Patrick Zircher DM cover: 978-1302946388

=== Iron Man ===
#	Title	Years covered	Material collected	Legacy	Pages	Released	ISBN
1	The Invincible Iron Man Vol. 1	1962-1966	Tales of Suspense #39–83; Tales to Astonish #82		720	7 May 2008	Jack Kirby cover: 978-0785129004
1	The Invincible Iron Man Vol. 1	1962-1966	Tales of Suspense #39–83; Tales to Astonish #82		720	7 May 2008	Iron Man Movie DM cover: 978-0785130550
1	The Invincible Iron Man Vol. 1	1962-1966	Tales of Suspense #39–83; Tales to Astonish #82		720	7 May 2008	Adi Granov DM cover: 978-0785130543
1	The Invincible Iron Man Vol. 1	1962-1966	Tales of Suspense #39–83; Tales to Astonish #82		752	29 Aug 2023	Gerald Parel cover: 978-1302953584
1	The Invincible Iron Man Vol. 1	1962-1966	Tales of Suspense #39–83; Tales to Astonish #82		752	29 Aug 2023	Adi Granov DM cover: 978-1302954154
1	The Invincible Iron Man Vol. 1	1962-1966	Tales of Suspense #39–83; Tales to Astonish #82		752	29 Aug 2023	Jack Kirby DM cover: 978-1302953591
2	The Invincible Iron Man Vol. 2	1966-1970	Tales of Suspense #84–99; Iron Man and the Sub-Mariner #1; Iron Man #1–25	#1–25	840	1 May 2010	Salvador Larroca cover: 978-0785142249
2	The Invincible Iron Man Vol. 2	1966-1970	Tales of Suspense #84–99; Iron Man and the Sub-Mariner #1; Iron Man #1–25	#1–25	840	1 May 2010	Gene Colan DM cover: 978-0785142256
2	The Invincible Iron Man Vol. 2	1966-1970	Tales of Suspense #84–99; Iron Man and the Sub-Mariner #1; Iron Man #1–25	#1–25	840	13 Aug 2024	Salvador Larroca cover: 978-1302958992
2	The Invincible Iron Man Vol. 2	1966-1970	Tales of Suspense #84–99; Iron Man and the Sub-Mariner #1; Iron Man #1–25	#1–25	840	13 Aug 2024	Gene Colan DM cover: 978-1302959005
3	The Invincible Iron Man Vol. 3	1970-1974	Iron Man #26–67; Daredevil #73	#26–67	968	27 Aug 2024	Gil Kane cover: 978-1302955403
3	The Invincible Iron Man Vol. 3	1970-1974	Iron Man #26–67; Daredevil #73	#26–67	968	27 Aug 2024	Gil Kane Namor DM cover: 978-1302955410
4	The Invincible Iron Man Vol. 4	1974-1978	Iron Man #68–112, Annual #3-4	#68–112	968	26 May 2026	Al Milgrom cover: 978-1302968281
4	The Invincible Iron Man Vol. 4	1974-1978	Iron Man #68–112, Annual #3-4	#68–112	968	26 May 2026	Jack Kirby DM cover: 978-1302968298
1	Iron Man by David Michelinie, Bob Layton and John Romita Jr.	1978-1982	Iron Man #115–157	#115–157	944	19 Feb 2013	John Romita Jr. cover: 978-0785167129
1	Iron Man by David Michelinie, Bob Layton and John Romita Jr.	1978-1982	Iron Man #115–157	#115–157	944	19 Feb 2013	Bob Layton DM cover: 978-0785167679
1	Iron Man by David Michelinie, Bob Layton and John Romita Jr.	1978-1982	Iron Man #115–157	#115–157	944	April 2027	John Romita Jr. cover: 978-0785167129
1	Iron Man by David Michelinie, Bob Layton and John Romita Jr.	1978-1982	Iron Man #115–157	#115–157	944	April 2027	Bob Layton DM cover: 978-0785167679
	Iron Man: Armor Wars	1987-1991, 2009	Iron Man #219-232, 258-266; Iron Man & the Armor Wars (2009) #1-4	#219-232, 258-266	680	13 Jan 2026	Mark Bright cover: 978-1302966065
	Iron Man: Armor Wars	1987-1991, 2009	Iron Man #219-232, 258-266; Iron Man & the Armor Wars (2009) #1-4	#219-232, 258-266	680	13 Jan 2026	John Romita Jr. cover: 978-1302966072
	Iron Man by Kurt Busiek and Sean Chen	1998-2000	Iron Man (1998) #1–25; Captain America (1998) #8; Quicksilver #10; Avengers (1998) #7; Iron Man/Captain America Annual 1998; Fantastic Four (1998) #15, Annual (1999); Thor (1998) #17; Peter Parker: Spider-Man #11; Juggernaut: The Eighth Day; Iron Man: The Iron Age #1–2	#346-370	1,024	17 Sep 2013	Sean Chen cover: 978-0785168140
	Iron Man: The Mask in the Iron Man	2000-2001	Iron Man (1998) #26–49, 1/2, Annual #1–2	#371-394	688	17 Dec 2019	Joe Quesada cover: 978-1302920654
	Tony Stark: Iron Man by Dan Slott	2018-2020	Tony Stark: Iron Man #1–19; Iron Man 2020 #1–6	#601-625	616	17 Mar 2021	Adi Granov cover: 978-1302928452
	Tony Stark: Iron Man by Dan Slott	2018-2020	Tony Stark: Iron Man #1–19; Iron Man 2020 #1–6	#601-625	616	17 Mar 2021	Alex Ross DM cover: 978-1302928469

=== Jessica Jones ===
Brian Michael Bendis wrote the entirety of the Alias series, which introduced the character of Jessica Jones to the Marvel Universe. The character "eschews costumes, works and plays hard, and opens up a set of detective stories unlike any the comics had seen before. Bendis provided a character with real heart and a unique point of view, and it's one that has broadened Marvel's horizons across mediums."

The Alias omnibus came out in March 2006. It was the second Marvel omnibus to be released overall, and the third reprint - in 2021 - was re-titled Jessica Jones: Alias.

#	Title	Years covered	Material collected	Pages	Released	ISBN
	Alias	2001-2004	Alias #1–28; What If...Jessica Jones Had Joined the Avengers?	592	29 Mar 2006	David Mack Secret Origin cover: 978-0785121213
	Alias	2001-2004	Alias #1–28; What If...Jessica Jones Had Joined the Avengers?	592	22 Oct 2014	David Mack Secret Origin cover: 978-0785190912
	Jessica Jones: Alias	2001-2004	Alias #1–28; What If...Jessica Jones Had Joined the Avengers?	592	7 Dec 2021	David Mack Secret Origin cover: 978-1302931308
	Jessica Jones: Alias	2001-2004	Alias #1–28; What If...Jessica Jones Had Joined the Avengers?	592	7 Dec 2021	David Mack First Issue DM cover: 978-1302931292

=== Ka-Zar ===
#	Title	Years covered	Material collected	Pages	Released	ISBN
	Ka-Zar the Savage	1981-1984	Ka-Zar the Savage #1–34	1,048	19 May 2021	Brent Anderson First Issue cover: 978-1302926786
	Ka-Zar the Savage	1981-1984	Ka-Zar the Savage #1–34	1,048	19 May 2021	Brent Anderson DM cover: 978-1302926793

=== The Knights of Pendragon ===
#	Title	Years covered	Material collected	Pages	Released	ISBN
	Knights of Pendragon	1990-1994	Knights of Pendragon (1990) #1–18, Knights of Pendragon (1992) #1–15, Overkill #5, Mys-Tech Wars (1993) #1–4, Dark Guard (1993) #1–4 and material from Marvel Comics Presents (1988) #122	1,016	20 Dec 2022	Alan Davis First Series cover: 978-1302931834
	Knights of Pendragon	1990-1994	Knights of Pendragon (1990) #1–18, Knights of Pendragon (1992) #1–15, Overkill #5, Mys-Tech Wars (1993) #1–4, Dark Guard (1993) #1–4 and material from Marvel Comics Presents (1988) #122	1,016	20 Dec 2022	Alan Davis Second Series DM cover: 978-1302931841

=== Loki ===
#	Title	Years covered	Material collected	Pages	Released	ISBN
1	Loki Vol. 1	1963-1970	Avengers (1963) #1; Journey into Mystery (1952) #111, 113, 115–123; Thor (1966) #153–157, 167, 173, 175–177, 179–181, Annual (1966) #2; material from Journey into Mystery (1952) #85, 88, 91-92, 94, 97, 100–104, 107–108, 110, 112, 114, 124–125, Thor (1966) #126–129, 142, 147–152, Strange Tales (1951) #123, Tales to Astonish (1959) #101 and Silver Surfer (1968) #4	1,008	28 Jul 2021	Mark Brooks cover: 978-1302930639
1	Loki Vol. 1	1963-1970	Avengers (1963) #1; Journey into Mystery (1952) #111, 113, 115–123; Thor (1966) #153–157, 167, 173, 175–177, 179–181, Annual (1966) #2; material from Journey into Mystery (1952) #85, 88, 91-92, 94, 97, 100–104, 107–108, 110, 112, 114, 124–125, Thor (1966) #126–129, 142, 147–152, Strange Tales (1951) #123, Tales to Astonish (1959) #101 and Silver Surfer (1968) #4	1,008	28 Jul 2021	Marie Severin DM cover: 978-1302930646
	Loki: God of Stories	2004-2020	Loki (2004) #1–4; Loki (2010) #1–4; Loki: Agent of Asgard (2014) #1–17; Original Sin (2014) #5.1–5.5; Vote Loki (2016) #1–4; Loki (2019) #1–5; Avengers: Loki Unleashed (2019) #1; material from All-New Marvel Now! Point One (2014) #1 and War of the Realms: Omega (2019) #1	976	13 Jun 2023	Özgür Yıldırım cover: 978-1302951696
	Loki: Journey into Mystery by Kieron Gillen	2011-2012	Journey into Mystery #622–645; Exiled #1; New Mutants (2009) #42–43; The Mighty Thor (2011) #18–21	752	15 Aug 2017	Stephanie Hans cover: 978-1302908645

=== Luke Cage ===
#	Title	Years covered	Material collected	Pages	Released	ISBN
	Luke Cage	1972-1977	Luke Cage, Hero for Hire (1972) #1–16; Luke Cage, Power Man (1974) #17–47, Annual (1977) #1	1,008	31 May 2022	Phil Noto cover: 978-1302944964
	Luke Cage	1972-1977	Luke Cage, Hero for Hire (1972) #1–16; Luke Cage, Power Man (1974) #17–47, Annual (1977) #1	1,008	31 May 2022	John Romita Sr. DM cover: 978-1302944971

=== Man-Thing ===
#	Title	Years covered	Material collected	Pages	Released	ISBN
	Man-Thing	1971-1981	Savage Tales #1; Astonishing Tales #12–13; Adventure into Fear #10–19; Man-Thing #1–22; Giant-Size Man-Thing #1–5; Incredible Hulk (vol. 2) #197–198; Marvel Team-Up #68; Marvel Two-in-One #43; Man-Thing (vol. 2) #1–11; Dr. Strange #41; material from Monsters Unleashed #5, 8–9 and Rampaging Hulk #7	1,192	17 Oct 2012	Ariel Olivetti cover: 978-0785164630
	Man-Thing	1971-1981	Savage Tales #1; Astonishing Tales #12–13; Adventure into Fear #10–19; Man-Thing #1–22; Giant-Size Man-Thing #1–5; Incredible Hulk (vol. 2) #197–198; Marvel Team-Up #68; Marvel Two-in-One #43; Man-Thing (vol. 2) #1–11; Dr. Strange #41; material from Monsters Unleashed #5, 8–9 and Rampaging Hulk #7	1,192	17 Oct 2012	Frank Brunner DM cover: 978-0785164685
	Man-Thing	1971-1981	Savage Tales #1; Astonishing Tales #12–13; Adventure into Fear #10–19; Man-Thing #1–22; Giant-Size Man-Thing #1–5; Incredible Hulk (vol. 2) #197–198; Marvel Team-Up #68; Marvel Two-in-One #43; Man-Thing (vol. 2) #1–11; Dr. Strange #41; material from Monsters Unleashed #5, 8–9 and Rampaging Hulk #7	1,192	26 May 2021	Ariel Olivetti cover: 978-1302929213
	Man-Thing	1971-1981	Savage Tales #1; Astonishing Tales #12–13; Adventure into Fear #10–19; Man-Thing #1–22; Giant-Size Man-Thing #1–5; Incredible Hulk (vol. 2) #197–198; Marvel Team-Up #68; Marvel Two-in-One #43; Man-Thing (vol. 2) #1–11; Dr. Strange #41; material from Monsters Unleashed #5, 8–9 and Rampaging Hulk #7	1,192	26 May 2021	Frank Brunner DM cover: 978-1302929220

=== Micronauts ===
Based on a Mego Corporation toy line, the Micronauts comics were produced by Marvel between 1979 and 1986. Marvel re-acquired the publishing rights in 2023.

#	Title	Years covered	Material collected	Pages	Released	ISBN
1	Micronauts: The Original Marvel Years Vol. 1	1979-1981, 1983-1984	The Micronauts (1979) #1–29, Annual (1979) #1–2, material from The Micronauts Special Edition (1983) #1–5	744	16 Apr 2024	Dave Cockrum cover: 978-1302956769
1	Micronauts: The Original Marvel Years Vol. 1	1979-1981, 1983-1984	The Micronauts (1979) #1–29, Annual (1979) #1–2, material from The Micronauts Special Edition (1983) #1–5	744	16 Apr 2024	Butch Guice DM cover: 978-1302956783
1	Micronauts: The Original Marvel Years Vol. 1	1979-1981, 1983-1984	The Micronauts (1979) #1–29, Annual (1979) #1–2, material from The Micronauts Special Edition (1983) #1–5	744	16 Apr 2024	Michael Golden DM cover: 978-1302957001
1	Micronauts: The Original Marvel Years Vol. 1	1979-1981, 1983-1984	The Micronauts (1979) #1–29, Annual (1979) #1–2, material from The Micronauts Special Edition (1983) #1–5	744	16 Apr 2024	Steve Ditko DM cover: 978-1302956776
2	Micronauts: The Original Marvel Years Vol. 2	1981-1983	The Micronauts (1979) #30–54; material from Marvel Preview (1975) #4, #7	888	17 Sep 2024	Michael Golden cover: 978-1302956790
2	Micronauts: The Original Marvel Years Vol. 2	1981-1983	The Micronauts (1979) #30–54; material from Marvel Preview (1975) #4, #7	888	17 Sep 2024	Bob Layton DM cover: 978-1302959531
2	Micronauts: The Original Marvel Years Vol. 2	1981-1983	The Micronauts (1979) #30–54; material from Marvel Preview (1975) #4, #7	888	17 Sep 2024	Gil Kane DM cover: 978-1302959524
3	Micronauts: The Original Marvel Years Vol. 3	1983-1986	The Micronauts (1979) #55–59, The Micronauts: The New Voyages (1984) #1–20	712	31 Dec 2024	Michael Golden cover: 978-1302957254
3	Micronauts: The Original Marvel Years Vol. 3	1983-1986	The Micronauts (1979) #55–59, The Micronauts: The New Voyages (1984) #1–20	712	31 Dec 2024	Arthur Adams DM cover: 978-1302956806
3	Micronauts: The Original Marvel Years Vol. 3	1983-1986	The Micronauts (1979) #55–59, The Micronauts: The New Voyages (1984) #1–20	712	31 Dec 2024	Kelley Jones DM cover: 978-1302959548

=== Miles Morales: Spider-Man ===
Miles Morales is a half-Black, half-Hispanic teenager and was created by Brian Michael Bendis. The character first appeared in Ultimate Comics: Fallout #4.

Bendis told USA Today that he was inspired in part by Donald Glover's appearance in the TV series Community dressed as Spider-Man. Bendis said: "[Glover] looked fantastic! I saw him in the costume and thought, 'I would like to read that book.' So I was glad I was writing that book."

- See also: Miles Morales collected editions

#	Title	Years covered	Material collected	Pages	Released	ISBN
1	Miles Morales: Ultimate Spider-Man Omnibus	2011-2015	Ultimate Comics Spider-Man #1–28, #16.1; Spider-Men #1–5; Cataclysm: Ultimate Spider-Man #1–3; Ultimate Spider-Man #200; Miles Morales: Ultimate Spider-Man #1–12; material from Ultimate Fallout #4	1,168	19 Jun 2018	Kaare Andrews cover: 978-1302925109
1	Miles Morales: Ultimate Spider-Man Omnibus	2011-2015	Ultimate Comics Spider-Man #1–28, #16.1; Spider-Men #1–5; Cataclysm: Ultimate Spider-Man #1–3; Ultimate Spider-Man #200; Miles Morales: Ultimate Spider-Man #1–12; material from Ultimate Fallout #4	1,168	8 Jul 2020	Kaare Andrews cover: 978-1302925109
1	Miles Morales: Ultimate Spider-Man Omnibus	2011-2015	Ultimate Comics Spider-Man #1–28, #16.1; Spider-Men #1–5; Cataclysm: Ultimate Spider-Man #1–3; Ultimate Spider-Man #200; Miles Morales: Ultimate Spider-Man #1–12; material from Ultimate Fallout #4	1,168	1 Nov 2022	Kaare Andrews cover: 978-1302945718
1	Miles Morales: Ultimate Spider-Man Omnibus	2011-2015	Ultimate Comics Spider-Man #1–28, #16.1; Spider-Men #1–5; Cataclysm: Ultimate Spider-Man #1–3; Ultimate Spider-Man #200; Miles Morales: Ultimate Spider-Man #1–12; material from Ultimate Fallout #4	1,168	1 Nov 2022	Sara Pichelli Venoma DM cover: 978-1302945725
2	Spider-Man: Miles Morales Omnibus	2016-2018	Spider-Man (vol. 2) #1–21, Spider-Gwen (vol. 2) #16–18, Spider-Men II #1–5, Spider-Man (vol. 2) #234–240	832	25 Feb 2020	Sara Pichelli cover: 978-1302922887
2	Spider-Man: Miles Morales Omnibus	2016-2018	Spider-Man (vol. 2) #1–21, Spider-Gwen (vol. 2) #16–18, Spider-Men II #1–5, Spider-Man (vol. 2) #234–240	856	20 Dec 2022	Sara Pichelli cover: 978-1302945732
2	Spider-Man: Miles Morales Omnibus	2016-2018	Spider-Man (vol. 2) #1–21, Spider-Gwen (vol. 2) #16–18, Spider-Men II #1–5, Spider-Man (vol. 2) #234–240	856	20 Dec 2022	Patrick Brown DM cover: 978-1302945749
	Miles Morales: Spider-Man by Saladin Ahmed Omnibus	2018-2022	Miles Morales: Spider-Man (2018) #1–42, Absolute Carnage: Miles Morales #1–3, Amazing Spider-Man (vol. 5) #81 and Miles Morales: The End, material from Free Comic Book Day 2019 (Spider-Man/Venom) #1, Incoming! #1, Amazing Spider-Man (vol. 6) #49 and Miles Morales: Spider-Man Annual #1	1,160	22 Aug 2023	Ernanda Souza cover: 978-1302950781
	Miles Morales: Spider-Man by Saladin Ahmed Omnibus	2018-2022	Miles Morales: Spider-Man (2018) #1–42, Absolute Carnage: Miles Morales #1–3, Amazing Spider-Man (vol. 5) #81 and Miles Morales: The End, material from Free Comic Book Day 2019 (Spider-Man/Venom) #1, Incoming! #1, Amazing Spider-Man (vol. 6) #49 and Miles Morales: Spider-Man Annual #1	1,160	22 Aug 2023	Taurin Clarke DM cover: 978-1302950798
Jump to: Spider-Man

=== Moon Knight ===
#	Title	Years covered	Material collected	Legacy	Pages	Released	ISBN
1	Moon Knight Vol. 1	1975-1982	Werewolf by Night (1972) #32–33; Marvel Spotlight (1971) #28–29; Defenders (1972) #47–50; Peter Parker, the Spectacular Spider-Man (1976) #22–23; Marvel Two-in-One (1974) #52; Moon Knight (1980) #1–20; Marvel Team-Up Annual #4; material from The Hulk! magazine #11–15, 17–18, 20, Marvel Preview #21 and Amazing Spider-Man (1963) #220	#1–20	1,016	6 Jan 2021	David Finch cover: 978-1302926861
1	Moon Knight Vol. 1	1975-1982	Werewolf by Night (1972) #32–33; Marvel Spotlight (1971) #28–29; Defenders (1972) #47–50; Peter Parker, the Spectacular Spider-Man (1976) #22–23; Marvel Two-in-One (1974) #52; Moon Knight (1980) #1–20; Marvel Team-Up Annual #4; material from The Hulk! magazine #11–15, 17–18, 20, Marvel Preview #21 and Amazing Spider-Man (1963) #220	#1–20	1,016	6 Jan 2021	Bill Sienkiewicz DM cover: 978-1302926878
1	Moon Knight Vol. 1	1975-1982	Werewolf by Night (1972) #32–33; Marvel Spotlight (1971) #28–29; Defenders (1972) #47–50; Peter Parker, the Spectacular Spider-Man (1976) #22–23; Marvel Two-in-One (1974) #52; Moon Knight (1980) #1–20; Marvel Team-Up Annual #4; material from The Hulk! magazine #11–15, 17–18, 20, Marvel Preview #21 and Amazing Spider-Man (1963) #220	#1–20	1,016	12 Apr 2022	David Finch cover: 978-1302933807
1	Moon Knight Vol. 1	1975-1982	Werewolf by Night (1972) #32–33; Marvel Spotlight (1971) #28–29; Defenders (1972) #47–50; Peter Parker, the Spectacular Spider-Man (1976) #22–23; Marvel Two-in-One (1974) #52; Moon Knight (1980) #1–20; Marvel Team-Up Annual #4; material from The Hulk! magazine #11–15, 17–18, 20, Marvel Preview #21 and Amazing Spider-Man (1963) #220	#1–20	1,016	12 Apr 2022	Bill Sienkiewicz DM cover: 978-1302933814
2	Moon Knight Vol. 2	1982-1985, 1988-1990	Moon Knight (1980) #21–38; Iron Man (1968) #161; Power Man and Iron Fist (1978) #87; Marvel Team-Up (1972) #144; Moon Knight: Fist of Khonshu (1985) #1–6; Marvel Fanfare (1982) #30; material from Solo Avengers (1987) #3, Marvel Fanfare (1982) #38–39 and Marvel Super-Heroes (1990) #1	#21–44	960	10 May 2022	Alex Ross cover: 978-1302934538
2	Moon Knight Vol. 2	1982-1985, 1988-1990	Moon Knight (1980) #21–38; Iron Man (1968) #161; Power Man and Iron Fist (1978) #87; Marvel Team-Up (1972) #144; Moon Knight: Fist of Khonshu (1985) #1–6; Marvel Fanfare (1982) #30; material from Solo Avengers (1987) #3, Marvel Fanfare (1982) #38–39 and Marvel Super-Heroes (1990) #1	#21–44	960	10 May 2022	Frank Miller DM cover: 978-1302934545
1	Marc Spector: Moon Knight Vol. 1	1989-1992	Marc Spector: Moon Knight (1989) #1–34, Amazing Spider-Man (1963) #353–358, Moon Knight: Divided We Fall (1992) #1, material from Punisher Annual #2	#45–78	1,064	28 Mar 2023	Denys Cowan cover: 978-1302950378
1	Marc Spector: Moon Knight Vol. 1	1989-1992	Marc Spector: Moon Knight (1989) #1–34, Amazing Spider-Man (1963) #353–358, Moon Knight: Divided We Fall (1992) #1, material from Punisher Annual #2	#45–78	1,064	28 Mar 2023	Carl Potts DM cover: 978-1302950385
2	Marc Spector: Moon Knight Vol. 2	1992-2000	Marc Spector: Moon Knight (1989) #35–60, Moon Knight Special (1992) #1, Web of Spider-Man (1985) #93–94, Moon Knight (1998) #1–4, Moon Knight (1999) #1–4, Black Panther (1998) #20–22, material from Marvel Comics Presents (1988) #152–154	#79–104	1,032	5 Mar 2024	Mark Texeira cover: 978-1302956899
2	Marc Spector: Moon Knight Vol. 2	1992-2000	Marc Spector: Moon Knight (1989) #35–60, Moon Knight Special (1992) #1, Web of Spider-Man (1985) #93–94, Moon Knight (1998) #1–4, Moon Knight (1999) #1–4, Black Panther (1998) #20–22, material from Marvel Comics Presents (1988) #152–154	#79–104	1,032	5 Mar 2024	Stephen Platt DM cover: 978-1302956905
	Moon Knight by Huston, Benson & Hurwitz	2006-2010	Moon Knight (2006) #1–30, Annual (2007) #1; Moon Knight: Silent Knight (2008) #1; Vengeance of the Moon Knight (2009) #1–10; Shadowland: Moon Knight (2010) #1–3	#105–144	1,184	17 May 2022	David Finch cover: 978-1302934569
	Moon Knight by Huston, Benson & Hurwitz	2006-2010	Moon Knight (2006) #1–30, Annual (2007) #1; Moon Knight: Silent Knight (2008) #1; Vengeance of the Moon Knight (2009) #1–10; Shadowland: Moon Knight (2010) #1–3	#105–144	1,184	17 May 2022	Mike Deodato Jr. DM cover: 978-1302934552
	Moon Knight by Jed MacKay	2021-2023	Moon Knight (2021) #1-30, Avengers (2018) #45 (Moon Knight teaser), Devil's Reign: Moon Knight (2022) #1, Moon Knight Annual (2022) #1, Moon Knight Annual (2023) #1 (A-story)	#201–230	832	8 Oct 2024	Greg Capullo cover: 978-1302959487
	Moon Knight by Jed MacKay	2021-2023	Moon Knight (2021) #1-30, Avengers (2018) #45 (Moon Knight teaser), Devil's Reign: Moon Knight (2022) #1, Moon Knight Annual (2022) #1, Moon Knight Annual (2023) #1 (A-story)	#201–230	832	8 Oct 2024	Arthur Adams DM cover: 978-1302959494
	Moon Knight by Jed MacKay	2021-2023	Moon Knight (2021) #1-30, Avengers (2018) #45 (Moon Knight teaser), Devil's Reign: Moon Knight (2022) #1, Moon Knight Annual (2022) #1, Moon Knight Annual (2023) #1 (A-story)	#201–230	832	Jul 2027	Greg Capullo cover: TBC
	Moon Knight by Jed MacKay	2021-2023	Moon Knight (2021) #1-30, Avengers (2018) #45 (Moon Knight teaser), Devil's Reign: Moon Knight (2022) #1, Moon Knight Annual (2022) #1, Moon Knight Annual (2023) #1 (A-story)	#201–230	832	Jul 2027	Arthur Adams DM cover: TBC

=== Morbius the Living Vampire ===
#	Title	Years covered	Material collected	Pages	Released	ISBN
	Morbius the Living Vampire	1971-1981	Amazing Spider-Man (1963) #101–102; Marvel Team-Up (1972) #3–4; Giant-Size Super-Heroes (1974) #1; Adventure into Fear (1970) #20–31; Giant-Size Werewolf (1974) #4; Marvel Premiere (1972) #28; Marvel Two-in-One (1974) #15; Peter Parker, the Spectacular Spider-Man (1976) #6–8, 38; Savage She-Hulk (1980) #9–12; material from Vampire Tales (1973) #1–5, 7–8, 10–11 and Marvel Preview (1975) #8; plus extras	864	12 May 2020	Kyle Hotz cover: 978-1302922405
	Morbius the Living Vampire	1971-1981	Amazing Spider-Man (1963) #101–102; Marvel Team-Up (1972) #3–4; Giant-Size Super-Heroes (1974) #1; Adventure into Fear (1970) #20–31; Giant-Size Werewolf (1974) #4; Marvel Premiere (1972) #28; Marvel Two-in-One (1974) #15; Peter Parker, the Spectacular Spider-Man (1976) #6–8, 38; Savage She-Hulk (1980) #9–12; material from Vampire Tales (1973) #1–5, 7–8, 10–11 and Marvel Preview (1975) #8; plus extras	864	12 May 2020	Gil Kane Adventure Into Fear DM cover: 978-1302922412

=== Ms. Marvel ===
#	Title	Years covered	Material collected	Pages	Released	ISBN
1	Ms. Marvel Vol. 1	2014-2015	Ms. Marvel (2014) #1–19; Marvel NOW! Point One #1 (Ms. Marvel story); S.H.I.E.L.D. #2; material from Amazing Spider-Man #7–8	488	15 Nov 2016	Jamie McKelvie cover: 978-1302902018
Jump to: Captain Marvel: Carol Danvers

=== The 'Nam ===
Between 1986 and 1993, The 'Nam detailed stories from the United States' war in Vietnam. Written by Doug Murray and edited by Larry Hama - both war veterans - the comic shied away from tales of conflict. Instead, "rather than making a statement about an extremely controversial war or musing about the nature of life and death, The 'Nam focused on just one thing: the people involved."

The series was largely intended to be separate from any Marvel continuity, however Frank Castle - the Punisher - made appearances from issue #52, and the character of Michael "Ice" Phillips went on to appear in issues of Punisher: War Journal.

#	Title	Years covered	Material collected	Pages	Released	ISBN
1	The 'Nam 1966-1969	1986-1990	The 'Nam #1-45; material from Savage Tales #1, 4	1,120	26 Aug 2025	Michael Golden cover: 978-1302965242
1	The 'Nam 1966-1969	1986-1990	The 'Nam #1-45; material from Savage Tales #1, 4	1,120	26 Aug 2025	John Romita & Ron Frenz DM cover: 978-1302965259

=== Namor the Sub-Mariner ===
#	Title	Years covered	Material collected	Pages	Released	ISBN
1	Timely's Greatest: The Golden Age Sub-Mariner by Bill Everett – The Pre-War Years	1939-1942	Material from Marvel Comics #1; Marvel Mystery Comics #2–31; Sub-Mariner Comics #1–4; Human Torch #2–6; All-Winners Comics #1–4; Daring Mystery Comics #7–8; Comedy Comics #9	872	17 Sep 2019	Bill Everett cover: 978-1302919351
2	Timely's Greatest: The Golden Age Sub-Mariner by Bill Everett – The Post-War Years	1946-1955	Material from Sub-Mariner Comics #21–24, 26–30, 32–42; Namora #1–3; Marvel Mystery Comics #84–86, 90–91; Human Torch #28, 30, 37–38; Blonde Phantom #17; Young Men #24–28; Men's Adventures #28	568	28 Apr 2020	Bill Everett cover: 978-1302922504
2	Timely's Greatest: The Golden Age Sub-Mariner by Bill Everett – The Post-War Years	1946-1955	Material from Sub-Mariner Comics #21–24, 26–30, 32–42; Namora #1–3; Marvel Mystery Comics #84–86, 90–91; Human Torch #28, 30, 37–38; Blonde Phantom #17; Young Men #24–28; Men's Adventures #28	568	28 Apr 2020	Bill Everett Circle DM cover: 978-1302922511
1	Namor the Sub-Mariner Vol. 1	1965-1968	Tales to Astonish #70-101 (Namor material only); Sub-Mariner (1968) #1; Fantastic Four #4, 6, 9, 14, 27, 33, Annual #1; Avengers #3-4; X-Men #6; Daredevil #7. Material from Strange Tales #107, 125; Tales of Suspense #79-80; Iron Man and Sub-Mariner #1; Not Brand Echh #1, 4, 9	912	12 Aug 2025	John Buscema cover: 978-1302962432
1	Namor the Sub-Mariner Vol. 1	1965-1968	Tales to Astonish #70-101 (Namor material only); Sub-Mariner (1968) #1; Fantastic Four #4, 6, 9, 14, 27, 33, Annual #1; Avengers #3-4; X-Men #6; Daredevil #7. Material from Strange Tales #107, 125; Tales of Suspense #79-80; Iron Man and Sub-Mariner #1; Not Brand Echh #1, 4, 9	912	12 Aug 2025	Gene Colan DM cover: 978-1302962449
	Namor the Sub-Mariner by John Byrne and Jae Lee	1990-1993	Namor the Sub-Mariner (1990) #1–40, Annual (1991) #1–2; material from Incredible Hulk Annual (1968) #18, Silver Surfer Annual (1988) #5 and Doctor Strange, Sorcerer Supreme Annual (1992) #2	1,192	15 Oct 2019	John Byrne cover: 978-1302919665
	Namor the Sub-Mariner by John Byrne and Jae Lee	1990-1993	Namor the Sub-Mariner (1990) #1–40, Annual (1991) #1–2; material from Incredible Hulk Annual (1968) #18, Silver Surfer Annual (1988) #5 and Doctor Strange, Sorcerer Supreme Annual (1992) #2	1,192	15 Oct 2019	Jae Lee DM cover: 978-1302919986

=== New Mutants ===
After 100 issues, New Mutants became X-Force.

#	Title	Years covered	Material collected	Legacy	Pages	Released	ISBN
1	New Mutants Vol. 1	1980, 1982-1985	Marvel Graphic Novel No. 4 - The New Mutants; New Mutants (1983) #1–34, Annual (1984) #1; Marvel Team-Up (1972) #100 (A-story), 149, Annual #6; Uncanny X-Men #160, 167, 180, 189, 192; Magik #1–4	#1-34	1,272	24 Nov 2020	Bill Sienkiewicz cover: 978-1302926885
1	New Mutants Vol. 1	1980, 1982-1985	Marvel Graphic Novel No. 4 - The New Mutants; New Mutants (1983) #1–34, Annual (1984) #1; Marvel Team-Up (1972) #100 (A-story), 149, Annual #6; Uncanny X-Men #160, 167, 180, 189, 192; Magik #1–4	#1-34	1,272	24 Nov 2020	Bob McLeod DM cover: 978-1302926892
2	New Mutants Vol. 2	1985-1987, 2019	New Mutants (1983) #35–54, Annual (1984) #2–3, Special Edition (1985) #1; X-Men Annual (1970) #9–10; Power Pack (1984) #20, 33; Fallen Angels (1987) #1–8; Firestar (1986) #1–4; New Mutants: War Children (2019) #1; material from Web of Spider-Man Annual (1985) #2	#35-54	1,240	15 Feb 2022	Barry Windsor-Smith cover: 978-1302932350
2	New Mutants Vol. 2	1985-1987, 2019	New Mutants (1983) #35–54, Annual (1984) #2–3, Special Edition (1985) #1; X-Men Annual (1970) #9–10; Power Pack (1984) #20, 33; Fallen Angels (1987) #1–8; Firestar (1986) #1–4; New Mutants: War Children (2019) #1; material from Web of Spider-Man Annual (1985) #2	#35-54	1,240	15 Feb 2022	Arthur Adams DM cover: 978-1302932350
3	New Mutants Vol. 3	1987-1990, 2008	New Mutants (1983) #55–85, Annual (1984) #4, Spellbound (1988) #4, Power Pack (1984) #40, Uncanny X-Men (1981) #231, X-Terminators (1988) #1–4; material from Marvel Comics Presents (1988) #22, Marvel Fanfare (1982) #55, Marvel Super-Heroes (1990) #1 and X-Men: Odd Men Out (2008) #1	#55-85	1,136	26 Dec 2023	Bret Blevins cover: 978-1302954086
3	New Mutants Vol. 3	1987-1990, 2008	New Mutants (1983) #55–85, Annual (1984) #4, Spellbound (1988) #4, Power Pack (1984) #40, Uncanny X-Men (1981) #231, X-Terminators (1988) #1–4; material from Marvel Comics Presents (1988) #22, Marvel Fanfare (1982) #55, Marvel Super-Heroes (1990) #1 and X-Men: Odd Men Out (2008) #1	#55-85	1,136	26 Dec 2023	John Byrne DM cover: 978-1302954093
4	New Mutants Vol. 4	1989-1991	New Mutants (1983) #86-100, Annual (1984) #5-7, Summer Special (1990) #1; Uncanny X-Men #270-272; X-Factor (1986) #60-62; Wolverine: Rahne of Terra (1991); material from Fantastic Four Annual (1963) #23; X-Factor Annual (1986) #5-6; X-Men Annual (1970) #14-15; New Warriors Annual (1991) #1; Marvel Comics Presents (1988) #71, 78-79, 121	#86-100	1,152	29 Dec 2026	Rob Liefeld Cable cover: 978-1302969806
4	New Mutants Vol. 4	1989-1991	New Mutants (1983) #86-100, Annual (1984) #5-7, Summer Special (1990) #1; Uncanny X-Men #270-272; X-Factor (1986) #60-62; Wolverine: Rahne of Terra (1991); material from Fantastic Four Annual (1963) #23; X-Factor Annual (1986) #5-6; X-Men Annual (1970) #14-15; New Warriors Annual (1991) #1; Marvel Comics Presents (1988) #71, 78-79, 121	#86-100	1,152	29 Dec 2026	TBC DM cover: TBC
Jump to: X-Force (#98-100)

=== New Warriors ===
#	Title	Years covered	Material collected	Pages	Released	ISBN
1	New Warriors Classic Vol. 1	1990-1992	New Warriors (1990) #1–26, Annual #1–2; Avengers (1963) #341–342; material from Thor (1966) #411–412, New Mutants Annual (1984) #7, X-Men Annual (1970) #15, X-Factor Annual #6, Amazing Spider-Man Annual (1964) #26, Spectacular Spider-Man Annual #12 and Web of Spider-Man Annual #8	1,064	14 May 2013	Skottie Young cover: 978-0785167747
1	New Warriors Classic Vol. 1	1990-1992	New Warriors (1990) #1–26, Annual #1–2; Avengers (1963) #341–342; material from Thor (1966) #411–412, New Mutants Annual (1984) #7, X-Men Annual (1970) #15, X-Factor Annual #6, Amazing Spider-Man Annual (1964) #26, Spectacular Spider-Man Annual #12 and Web of Spider-Man Annual #8	1,064	14 May 2013	Mark Bagley DM cover: 978-0785167754
1	New Warriors Classic Vol. 1	1990-1992	New Warriors (1990) #1–26, Annual #1–2; Avengers (1963) #341–342; material from Thor (1966) #411–412, New Mutants Annual (1984) #7, X-Men Annual (1970) #15, X-Factor Annual #6, Amazing Spider-Man Annual (1964) #26, Spectacular Spider-Man Annual #12 and Web of Spider-Man Annual #8	1,064	10 Mar 2021	Skottie Young cover: 978-1302926908
1	New Warriors Classic Vol. 1	1990-1992	New Warriors (1990) #1–26, Annual #1–2; Avengers (1963) #341–342; material from Thor (1966) #411–412, New Mutants Annual (1984) #7, X-Men Annual (1970) #15, X-Factor Annual #6, Amazing Spider-Man Annual (1964) #26, Spectacular Spider-Man Annual #12 and Web of Spider-Man Annual #8	1,064	10 Mar 2021	Mark Bagley DM cover: 978-1302926915
2	New Warriors Classic Vol. 2	1992-1994	New Warriors (1990) #27–53, Annual (1991) #3–4; Night Thrasher: Four Control (1992) #1–4; X-Force (1991) #32–33; Night Thrasher (1993) #1 (A-story), 11–12; Nova (1994) #6–7; New Warriors Ashcan Edition (1994) #1; material from Marvel Comics Presents (1988) #122, 159–163 and Marvel Holiday Special 1991 #2	1,136	29 Nov 2022	Darick Robertson cover: 978-1302932954
2	New Warriors Classic Vol. 2	1992-1994	New Warriors (1990) #27–53, Annual (1991) #3–4; Night Thrasher: Four Control (1992) #1–4; X-Force (1991) #32–33; Night Thrasher (1993) #1 (A-story), 11–12; Nova (1994) #6–7; New Warriors Ashcan Edition (1994) #1; material from Marvel Comics Presents (1988) #122, 159–163 and Marvel Holiday Special 1991 #2	1,136	29 Nov 2022	Richard Pace DM cover: 978-1302932961
3	New Warriors Classic Vol. 3	1994-1996	New Warriors (1990) #54–75, Justice: Four Balance (1994) #1–4, Nova (1994) #17–18, Spectacular Spider-Man (1976) #228, Web of Spider-Man (1985) #129, Web of Scarlet Spider (1995) #3–4; material from Marvel Comics Presents (1988) #155–158, #166–167; Venom: Along Came a Spider (1996) #1–4; Venom: The Hunted (1996) 1–3	984	4 Jun 2024	Patrick Zircher Scarlet Spider cover: 978-1302953812
3	New Warriors Classic Vol. 3	1994-1996	New Warriors (1990) #54–75, Justice: Four Balance (1994) #1–4, Nova (1994) #17–18, Spectacular Spider-Man (1976) #228, Web of Spider-Man (1985) #129, Web of Scarlet Spider (1995) #3–4; material from Marvel Comics Presents (1988) #155–158, #166–167; Venom: Along Came a Spider (1996) #1–4; Venom: The Hunted (1996) 1–3	984	4 Jun 2024	Patrick Zircher Nova DM cover: 978-1302953829
	New Warriors: Nova & Night Thrasher	1993-1996	Night Thrasher (1993) #1 (B-story), 2–10, 13–21; Nova (1994) #1–5, 8–16; Fantastic Four (1961) #356; Amazing Spider-Man (1963) #351–358; Darkhawk (1991) #26–27 (A-stories), 28–29; Web of Spider-Man (1985) #109 (A-story); Iron Man (1968) #303; Spider-Man: Friends and Enemies (1995) #1–4; Ultragirl (1996) #1–3	1,320	22 Jul 2025	Chris Marrinan cover: 978-1302964344
	New Warriors: Nova & Night Thrasher	1993-1996	Night Thrasher (1993) #1 (B-story), 2–10, 13–21; Nova (1994) #1–5, 8–16; Fantastic Four (1961) #356; Amazing Spider-Man (1963) #351–358; Darkhawk (1991) #26–27 (A-stories), 28–29; Web of Spider-Man (1985) #109 (A-story); Iron Man (1968) #303; Spider-Man: Friends and Enemies (1995) #1–4; Ultragirl (1996) #1–3	1,320	22 Jul 2025	Mark Bagley DM cover: 978-1302964351

=== Nova ===
#	Title	Years covered	Material collected	Pages	Released	ISBN
	Nova (Richard Rider)	1976-1979, 1982-1986	Nova (1976) #1–25; Amazing Spider-Man (1963) #171; Fantastic Four Annual (1963) #12; Defenders (1972) #62–64; Marvel Two-in-One (1974) #91, Annual (1976) #3; Fantastic Four (1961) #204–206, 208–214; Thing (1983) #34; material from What If? (1977) #36	880	28 Mar 2023	John Buscema cover: 978-1302950941
	Nova (Richard Rider)	1976-1979, 1982-1986	Nova (1976) #1–25; Amazing Spider-Man (1963) #171; Fantastic Four Annual (1963) #12; Defenders (1972) #62–64; Marvel Two-in-One (1974) #91, Annual (1976) #3; Fantastic Four (1961) #204–206, 208–214; Thing (1983) #34; material from What If? (1977) #36	880	28 Mar 2023	Keith Pollard DM cover: 978-1302950958

=== Phoenix ===
#	Title	Years covered	Material collected	Pages	Released	ISBN
1	Phoenix Vol. 1	1975-1980, 1981-1990	X-Men #97–105, 107–108, 125–138; Phoenix: The Untold Story (one-shot); material from Classic X-Men #6, 8, 13, 18, 24, 43; Bizarre Adventures #27 and What If? (1977) #27	688	7 Jun 2022	Russell Dauterman cover: 978-1302945763
1	Phoenix Vol. 1	1975-1980, 1981-1990	X-Men #97–105, 107–108, 125–138; Phoenix: The Untold Story (one-shot); material from Classic X-Men #6, 8, 13, 18, 24, 43; Bizarre Adventures #27 and What If? (1977) #27	688	7 Jun 2022	Rick Leonardi DM cover: 978-1302945770
1 (Alt)	X-Men: Dark Phoenix Saga	1975-1980, 1981-1990	X-Men #97–105, 107–108, 125–138; Phoenix: The Untold Story (one-shot); material from Classic X-Men #6, 8, 13, 18, 24, 43; Bizarre Adventures #27 and What If? (1977) #27	688	14 Aug 2018	John Byrne cover: 978-1302912123
2	Phoenix Vol. 2	1981-1983	X-Men (1963) #141; Uncanny X-Men (1981) #142, 168–176, 184, 199, 201–203, 207–209, 221–222, 239, 243; Avengers (1963) #263; Fantastic Four (1961) #286; X-Factor (1986) #1, 13, 18, 35–39; Excalibur (1988) #42–50, 52, 61, 66–67	1,328	19 Sep 2023	Stanley Lau "Artgerm" cover: 978-1302951917
2	Phoenix Vol. 2	1981-1983	X-Men (1963) #141; Uncanny X-Men (1981) #142, 168–176, 184, 199, 201–203, 207–209, 221–222, 239, 243; Avengers (1963) #263; Fantastic Four (1961) #286; X-Factor (1986) #1, 13, 18, 35–39; Excalibur (1988) #42–50, 52, 61, 66–67	1,328	19 Sep 2023	Walter Simonson DM cover: 978-1302951924
3	Phoenix: The Death and Rebirth of Jean Grey	2002-2018	New X-Men (2001) #128, 139-141, 146-154; X-Men: Phoenix - Endsong #1-5; X-Men: Phoenix - Warsong #1-5; Avengers vs. X-Men #0-12; Jean Grey (2017) #1-11; Generations: Phoenix & Jean Grey; Phoenix Resurrection: The Return of Jean Grey #1-5; material from Point One (2011) #1	1,352	16 Sep 2025	Stanley Lau "Artgerm" cover: 978-1302965501
3	Phoenix: The Death and Rebirth of Jean Grey	2002-2018	New X-Men (2001) #128, 139-141, 146-154; X-Men: Phoenix - Endsong #1-5; X-Men: Phoenix - Warsong #1-5; Avengers vs. X-Men #0-12; Jean Grey (2017) #1-11; Generations: Phoenix & Jean Grey; Phoenix Resurrection: The Return of Jean Grey #1-5; material from Point One (2011) #1	1,352	16 Sep 2025	Jim Lee DM cover: 978-1302965518
Jump to: X-Men omnibuses

=== Power Pack ===
#	Title	Years covered	Material collected	Pages	Released	ISBN
1	Power Pack Classic Vol. 1	1984-1988	Power Pack (1984) #1–36; Uncanny X-Men (1981) #195, 205; Thor (1966) #363; X-Factor Annual #2; Marvel Graphic Novel No. 56 – Power Pack & Cloak and Dagger: Shelter from the Storm; material from Strange Tales (1987) #13–14	1,160	17 Mar 2020	June Brigman cover: 978-1302923679
1	Power Pack Classic Vol. 1	1984-1988	Power Pack (1984) #1–36; Uncanny X-Men (1981) #195, 205; Thor (1966) #363; X-Factor Annual #2; Marvel Graphic Novel No. 56 – Power Pack & Cloak and Dagger: Shelter from the Storm; material from Strange Tales (1987) #13–14	1,160	17 Mar 2020	Jon Bogdanove DM cover: 978-1302924331
2	Power Pack Classic Vol. 2	1988-2017	Power Pack (1984) #37–62; Excalibur (1988) #29; Power Pack Holiday Special #1; Power Pack (2000) #1–4; Fantastic Four (1998) #574; FF (2011) #15; Power Pack (2017) #63; Power Pack: Grow Up!; material from Marvel Super-Heroes (1990) #6 and Marvel Fanfare (1982) #55	1,056	9 Jun 2021	Jon Bogdanove cover: 978-1302930363
2	Power Pack Classic Vol. 2	1988-2017	Power Pack (1984) #37–62; Excalibur (1988) #29; Power Pack Holiday Special #1; Power Pack (2000) #1–4; Fantastic Four (1998) #574; FF (2011) #15; Power Pack (2017) #63; Power Pack: Grow Up!; material from Marvel Super-Heroes (1990) #6 and Marvel Fanfare (1982) #55	1,056	9 Jun 2021	June Brigman DM cover: 978-1302930370

=== The Punisher ===
#	Title	Years covered	Material collected	Pages	Released	ISBN
	Punisher: Back to the War	1974-1986	Amazing Spider-Man #129, 134–135, 161–162, 174–175, 201–202, Annual #15; Giant-Size Spider-Man #4; Marvel Preview #2; Marvel Super Action #1, Captain America #241; Daredevil #182–184; Peter Parker, the Spectacular Spider-Man #81–83; The Punisher #1–5	696	19 Sep 2017	Declan Shalvey cover: 978-1302908232
	Punisher by Garth Ennis	2000-2004, 1985	The Punisher (vol. 5) #1–12; The Punisher(vol. 6) #1–7, 13–37; Punisher Kills the Marvel Universe; material from Marvel Knights Double-Shot #1	1,136	26 Nov 2008	Tim Bradstreet cover: 978-0785133834
	Punisher by Garth Ennis	2000-2004, 1985	The Punisher (vol. 5) #1–12; The Punisher(vol. 6) #1–7, 13–37; Punisher Kills the Marvel Universe; material from Marvel Knights Double-Shot #1	1,136	19 Sep 2017	Tim Bradstreet cover: 978-1302907884
1	Punisher MAX by Garth Ennis Vol. 1	2003-2006	Punisher: Born #1–4; Punisher (vol. 7) #1–30	864	15 May 2018	Tim Bradstreet cover: 978-1302912079
1	Punisher MAX by Garth Ennis Vol. 1	2003-2006	Punisher: Born #1–4; Punisher (vol. 7) #1–30	864	18 Jun 2024	Tim Bradstreet cover: 978-1302957711
1	Punisher MAX by Garth Ennis Vol. 1	2003-2006	Punisher: Born #1–4; Punisher (vol. 7) #1–30	864	18 Jun 2024	Wieslaw Walkuski DM cover: 978-1302957728
2	Punisher MAX by Garth Ennis Vol. 2	2004-2008	Punisher (vol. 7) #31–60; Punisher Presents: Barracuda #1–5; Punisher: The Tyger; Punisher: The Cell; Punisher: The End	1,008	14 Aug 2018	Tim Bradstreet cover: 978-1302912062
	Punisher by Rick Remender	2009-2011	Punisher (vol. 8) #1–16, Annual #1; Punisher: Dark Reign – The List; Franken-Castle #17–21; Dark Wolverine #88–89; Punisher: In the Blood #1–5	768	18 Jul 2012	Steve Dillon cover: 978-0785162131
	Punisher by Rick Remender	2009-2011	Punisher (vol. 8) #1–16, Annual #1; Punisher: Dark Reign – The List; Franken-Castle #17–21; Dark Wolverine #88–89; Punisher: In the Blood #1–5	768	25 Mar 2025	Mike McKone cover: 978-1302963545
	Punisher by Rick Remender	2009-2011	Punisher (vol. 8) #1–16, Annual #1; Punisher: Dark Reign – The List; Franken-Castle #17–21; Dark Wolverine #88–89; Punisher: In the Blood #1–5	768	25 Mar 2025	Dan Brereton DM cover: 978-1302963552
	Punisher MAX by Aaron & Dillon	2010-2012	Punisher MAX #1–22; Punisher MAX X-Mas Special	544	17 Jun 2014	Dave Johnson cover: 978-0785154297
	Punisher MAX by Aaron & Dillon	2010-2012	Punisher MAX #1–22; Punisher MAX X-Mas Special	544	5 Nov 2024	Dave Johnson cover: 978-1302959104
	Punisher MAX by Aaron & Dillon	2010-2012	Punisher MAX #1–22; Punisher MAX X-Mas Special	544	5 Nov 2024	Steve Dillon DM cover: 978-1302959111
	Punisher & Fury MAX by Garth Ennis	2012-2013, 2017, 2020, 2024	Punisher: The Platoon #1-6; Punisher: Soviet #1-6; Fury MAX #1-13; Get Fury #1-6	712	7 Jul 2026	Dave Johnson cover: 978-1302967826
	Punisher & Fury MAX by Garth Ennis	2012-2013, 2017, 2020, 2024	Punisher: The Platoon #1-6; Punisher: Soviet #1-6; Fury MAX #1-13; Get Fury #1-6	712	7 Jul 2026	Jacen Burrows DM cover: 978-1302967833

=== Rom the Space Knight ===
Marvel's original 1979 comic, Rom: Spaceknight, ran for seven years and was based on a toy line. IDW Publishing produced Rom comics from 2016, before Marvel regained the licence in 2023.

#	Title	Years covered	Material collected	Pages	Released	ISBN
1	Rom: The Original Marvel Years Vol. 1	1979-1982	Rom (1979) #1–29, Power Man and Iron Fist (1978) #73	712	23 Jan 2024	Frank Miller cover: 978-1302956714
1	Rom: The Original Marvel Years Vol. 1	1979-1982	Rom (1979) #1–29, Power Man and Iron Fist (1978) #73	712	23 Jan 2024	Sal Buscema DM cover: 978-1302956998
1	Rom: The Original Marvel Years Vol. 1	1979-1982	Rom (1979) #1–29, Power Man and Iron Fist (1978) #73	712	23 Jan 2024	George Perez DM cover: 978-1302956738
1	Rom: The Original Marvel Years Vol. 1	1979-1982	Rom (1979) #1–29, Power Man and Iron Fist (1978) #73	712	23 Jan 2024	Frank Miller X-Men DM cover: 978-1302956721
2	Rom: The Original Marvel Years Vol. 2	1982-1983	Rom (1979) #30–50, Annual (1982) #1–2; Marvel Two-in-One (1974) #99	664	18 Jun 2024	Bill Sienkiewicz cover: 978-1302956745
2	Rom: The Original Marvel Years Vol. 2	1982-1983	Rom (1979) #30–50, Annual (1982) #1–2; Marvel Two-in-One (1974) #99	664	18 Jun 2024	Mike Zeck DM cover: 978-1302953829
3	Rom: The Original Marvel Years Vol. 3	1983-1985	Rom (1979) #51–75, Annual (1982) #3–4, Incredible Hulk (vol. 2) #296	744	5 Nov 2024	P. Craig Russell cover: 978-1302957278
3	Rom: The Original Marvel Years Vol. 3	1983-1985	Rom (1979) #51–75, Annual (1982) #3–4, Incredible Hulk (vol. 2) #296	744	5 Nov 2024	Bill Sienkiewicz DM cover: 978-1302957285

=== Runaways ===
- See also: Runaways collected editions

#	Title	Years covered	Material collected	Pages	Released	ISBN
	Runaways by Brian K. Vaughan & Adrian Alphona	2003-2007	Runaways (2003) #1–18; Runaways (2005) #1–24; FCBD: X-Men/Runaways (2006)	1,072	19 Jun 2018	Adrian Alphona cover: 978-1302912185

=== Secret Warriors ===
#	Title	Years covered	Material collected	Pages	Released	ISBN
	Secret Warriors	2008-2011	Mighty Avengers #13, 18; Secret Warriors #1–28; Dark Reign: The List – Secret Warriors; Siege: Secret Warriors; material from Dark Reign: New Nation	904	18 Jul 2012	Jim Cheung cover: 978-0785163336
	Secret Warriors	2008-2011	Mighty Avengers #13, 18; Secret Warriors #1–28; Dark Reign: The List – Secret Warriors; Siege: Secret Warriors; material from Dark Reign: New Nation	904	1 Aug 2023	Jim Cheung cover: 978-1302952556
	Secret Warriors	2008-2011	Mighty Avengers #13, 18; Secret Warriors #1–28; Dark Reign: The List – Secret Warriors; Siege: Secret Warriors; material from Dark Reign: New Nation	904	1 Aug 2023	Ed McGuinness Nick Fury DM cover: 978-1302952563

=== Sentry ===
#	Title	Years covered	Material collected	Pages	Released	ISBN
	The Sentry	2000-2024	Sentry (2000) #1-5; Sentry/Fantastic Four #1; Sentry/X-Men #1; Sentry/Spider-Man #1; Sentry Vs. The Void #1; New Avengers (2004) #7-10 and #24; Sentry (2005) #1-8; Civil War: The Return #1; Sentry: Fallen Sun #1; Mighty Avengers (2007) #14; The Age of the Sentry #1-6; Dark Avengers #13-15; Siege #4; Sentry (2018) #1-5; Sentry (2024) #1-4	1128	3 Feb 2026	David Finch cover: 978-1302966492
	The Sentry	2000-2024	Sentry (2000) #1-5; Sentry/Fantastic Four #1; Sentry/X-Men #1; Sentry/Spider-Man #1; Sentry Vs. The Void #1; New Avengers (2004) #7-10 and #24; Sentry (2005) #1-8; Civil War: The Return #1; Sentry: Fallen Sun #1; Mighty Avengers (2007) #14; The Age of the Sentry #1-6; Dark Avengers #13-15; Siege #4; Sentry (2018) #1-5; Sentry (2024) #1-4	1128	3 Feb 2026	Dave Bullock DM cover: 978-1302966508

=== Shang-Chi, Master of Kung Fu ===
#	Title	Years covered	Material collected	Pages	Released	ISBN
1	Shang-Chi, Master of Kung Fu Vol. 1	1973-1975, 1977	Special Marvel Edition #15–16; Master of Kung Fu (1974) #17–37; Giant-Size Master of Kung Fu #1–4; Giant-Size Spider-Man #2; material from Iron Man Annual #4	696	14 Jun 2016	Gabriele Dell'Otto cover: 978-1302901295
1	Shang-Chi, Master of Kung Fu Vol. 1	1973-1975, 1977	Special Marvel Edition #15–16; Master of Kung Fu (1974) #17–37; Giant-Size Master of Kung Fu #1–4; Giant-Size Spider-Man #2; material from Iron Man Annual #4	696	14 Jun 2016	Jim Starlin DM cover: 978-1302901462
2	Shang-Chi, Master of Kung Fu Vol. 2	1975-1978	Master of Kung Fu (1974) #38–70, Annual #1	664	20 Sep 2016	John Cassaday cover: 978-1302901301
2	Shang-Chi, Master of Kung Fu Vol. 2	1975-1978	Master of Kung Fu (1974) #38–70, Annual #1	664	20 Sep 2016	Paul Gulacy DM cover: 978-1302901745
3	Shang-Chi, Master of Kung Fu Vol. 3	1978-1981	Master of Kung Fu (1974) #71–101; What If? (1977) #16	704	14 Mar 2017	Mike Deodato Jr. cover: 978-1302901318
3	Shang-Chi, Master of Kung Fu Vol. 3	1978-1981	Master of Kung Fu (1974) #71–101; What If? (1977) #16	704	14 Mar 2017	Mike Zeck DM cover: 978-1302901851
4	Shang-Chi, Master of Kung Fu Vol. 4	1981-1990	Master of Kung Fu (1974) #102–125; Marvel Comics Presents (1988) #1–8; Master of Kung Fu: Bleeding Black (1990) #1	748	17 Oct 2017	David Mack cover: 978-1302901325
4	Shang-Chi, Master of Kung Fu Vol. 4	1981-1990	Master of Kung Fu (1974) #102–125; Marvel Comics Presents (1988) #1–8; Master of Kung Fu: Bleeding Black (1990) #1	748	17 Oct 2017	Ron Wilson DM cover: 978-1302901868
Jump to: The Deadly Hands of Kung Fu omnibuses

=== She-Hulk ===
#	Title	Years covered	Material collected	Legacy	Pages	Released	ISBN
	The Savage She-Hulk	1980-1982	Savage She-Hulk (1980) #1–25; Marvel Two-in-One (1974) #88	#1-25	648	19 Apr 2022	Frank Cho cover: 978-1302934224
	The Savage She-Hulk	1980-1982	Savage She-Hulk (1980) #1–25; Marvel Two-in-One (1974) #88	#1-25	648	19 Apr 2022	John Buscema DM cover: 978-1302934231
	The Sensational She-Hulk by John Byrne	1985-1993	Marvel Graphic Novel (1982) No. 18 – The Sensational She-Hulk; Sensational She-Hulk (1989) #1–8, 31–46, 48–50; material from Marvel Comics Presents (1988) #18	#26-33, #56-71, #73-75	752	28 Apr 2020	John Byrne Strength cover: 978-1302923686
	The Sensational She-Hulk by John Byrne	1985-1993	Marvel Graphic Novel (1982) No. 18 – The Sensational She-Hulk; Sensational She-Hulk (1989) #1–8, 31–46, 48–50; material from Marvel Comics Presents (1988) #18	#26-33, #56-71, #73-75	752	28 Apr 2020	John Byrne Fourth Wall DM cover: 978-1302924515
	She-Hulk by Dan Slott	2004-2007	She-Hulk (2004) #1–12; She-Hulk (2005) #1–21; Marvel Westerns: Two-Gun Kid (2006)	#86-118	824	10 Nov 2020	Adi Granov cover: 978-1302925321
	She-Hulk by Dan Slott	2004-2007	She-Hulk (2004) #1–12; She-Hulk (2005) #1–21; Marvel Westerns: Two-Gun Kid (2006)	#86-118	824	21 Dec 2022	Adi Granov cover: 978-1302947231
	She-Hulk by Dan Slott	2004-2007	She-Hulk (2004) #1–12; She-Hulk (2005) #1–21; Marvel Westerns: Two-Gun Kid (2006)	#86-118	824	21 Dec 2022	Mike Mayhew DM cover: 978-1302947248
	She-Hulk by Peter David	2007-2010, 1989	She-Hulk (2005) #22–38; She-Hulk: Cosmic Collision; X-Factor (2005) #33–34; Sensational She-Hulk #12; material from She-Hulk Sensational #1	#37, #119-135	552	17 May 2022	Mike Deodato cover: 978-1302934835
	She-Hulk by Peter David	2007-2010, 1989	She-Hulk (2005) #22–38; She-Hulk: Cosmic Collision; X-Factor (2005) #33–34; Sensational She-Hulk #12; material from She-Hulk Sensational #1	#37, #119-135	552	17 May 2022	Ed McGuinness DM cover: 978-1302934842
	She-Hulk by Rainbow Rowell	2022-2024	She-Hulk (2022) #1-15; Sensational She-Hulk (2023) #1-10	#164-188	600	28 Oct 2025	Jen Bartel cover: 978-1302966409
	She-Hulk by Rainbow Rowell	2022-2024	She-Hulk (2022) #1-15; Sensational She-Hulk (2023) #1-10	#164-188	600	28 Oct 2025	Peach Momoko DM cover: 978-1302966416

=== S.H.I.E.L.D. ===
#	Title	Years covered	Material collected	Pages	Released	ISBN
	S.H.I.E.L.D.: The Complete Collection	1963-1976	Strange Tales (1951) #135–168; Nick Fury, Agent of S.H.I.E.L.D. (1968) #1–15; Fantastic Four (1961) #21; Tales of Suspense (1959) #78; Avengers (1963) #72; Marvel Spotlight (1971) #31; material from Not Brand Echh (1967) #3, 8, 11	960	6 Oct 2015	Alex Ross cover: 978-0785198529
	S.H.I.E.L.D.: The Complete Collection	1963-1976	Strange Tales (1951) #135–168; Nick Fury, Agent of S.H.I.E.L.D. (1968) #1–15; Fantastic Four (1961) #21; Tales of Suspense (1959) #78; Avengers (1963) #72; Marvel Spotlight (1971) #31; material from Not Brand Echh (1967) #3, 8, 11	960	6 Oct 2015	Jim Steranko DM cover: 978-0785198536
	S.H.I.E.L.D. by Hickman and Weaver	2010-2018	S.H.I.E.L.D. (2010) #1-6, Director's Cut; S.H.I.E.L.D.(2011) #1-4; S.H.I.E.L.D. by Hickman and Weaver (2018) #5-6; S.H.I.E.L.D. Infinity (2011)	384	21 Oct 2025	Gerald Parel cover: 978-1302966386
	S.H.I.E.L.D. by Hickman and Weaver	2010-2018	S.H.I.E.L.D. (2010) #1-6, Director's Cut; S.H.I.E.L.D.(2011) #1-4; S.H.I.E.L.D. by Hickman and Weaver (2018) #5-6; S.H.I.E.L.D. Infinity (2011)	384	21 Oct 2025	Dustin Weaver DM cover: 978-1302966393
	Agents of S.H.I.E.L.D.	2014-2023	S.H.I.E.L.D. (2014) #1-12; Agents of S.H.I.E.L.D. #1-10; Agent Carter, Cavalry, Fury, Mockingbird, Quake: S.H.I.E.L.D. 50th Anniversary one-shots; Fury (2023) #1; material from All-New, All-Different Point One	672	31 Mar 2026	Julian Totino Tedesco cover: 978-1302966591
	Agents of S.H.I.E.L.D.	2014-2023	S.H.I.E.L.D. (2014) #1-12; Agents of S.H.I.E.L.D. #1-10; Agent Carter, Cavalry, Fury, Mockingbird, Quake: S.H.I.E.L.D. 50th Anniversary one-shots; Fury (2023) #1; material from All-New, All-Different Point One	672	31 Mar 2026	Mike Norton DM cover: 978-1302966607

=== Silver Surfer ===
#	Title	Years covered	Material collected	Legacy	Pages	Released	ISBN
1	The Silver Surfer Vol. 1	1967-1969	Silver Surfer (1968) #1–18 (main stories only); material from Fantastic Four Annual #5; Not Brand Echh #13	#1-18	576	6 Jun 2007	John Buscema cover: 978-0785127529
1	The Silver Surfer Vol. 1	1967-1969	Silver Surfer (1968) #1–18 (main stories only); material from Fantastic Four Annual #5; Not Brand Echh #13	#1-18	576	6 Jun 2007	Esad Ribić DM cover: 978-0785127536
1	The Silver Surfer Vol. 1	1967-1969	Silver Surfer (1968) #1–18 (main stories only); material from Fantastic Four Annual #5; Not Brand Echh #13	#1-18	576	5 May 2020	John Buscema cover 978-1302922696
1	The Silver Surfer Vol. 1	1967-1969	Silver Surfer (1968) #1–18 (main stories only); material from Fantastic Four Annual #5; Not Brand Echh #13	#1-18	576	5 May 2020	Esad Ribić DM cover: 978-1302924546
1	The Silver Surfer Vol. 1	1967-1969	Silver Surfer (1968) #1–18 (main stories only); material from Fantastic Four Annual #5; Not Brand Echh #13	#1-18	576	3 Jun 2025	John Buscema cover: 978-1302963583
1	The Silver Surfer Vol. 1	1967-1969	Silver Surfer (1968) #1–18 (main stories only); material from Fantastic Four Annual #5; Not Brand Echh #13	#1-18	576	3 Jun 2025	John Buscema Thor DM cover: 978-1302963590
2	Silver Surfer: Return to the Spaceways	1980-1990	Silver Surfer (1982) #1; Silver Surfer (1987) #1–33, Annual (1988) #1–2; Marvel Graphic Novel No. 38: Silver Surfer: Judgment Day (1988); Silver Surfer (1988) #1–2; Silver Surfer: The Enslavers (1990); Fantastic Four (1961) #325; Super-Villain Classics (1983) #1; material from Epic Illustrated (1980) #1, Marvel Comics Presents (1988) #1 and Marvel Fanfare (1982) #51	#19-52	1,360	20 May 2025	Ron Lim cover: 978-1302964429
2	Silver Surfer: Return to the Spaceways	1980-1990	Silver Surfer (1982) #1; Silver Surfer (1987) #1–33, Annual (1988) #1–2; Marvel Graphic Novel No. 38: Silver Surfer: Judgment Day (1988); Silver Surfer (1988) #1–2; Silver Surfer: The Enslavers (1990); Fantastic Four (1961) #325; Super-Villain Classics (1983) #1; material from Epic Illustrated (1980) #1, Marvel Comics Presents (1988) #1 and Marvel Fanfare (1982) #51	#19-52	1,360	20 May 2025	Jim Lee DM cover: 978-1302964436
3	Silver Surfer: The Infinity Gauntlet	1990-1992	Silver Surfer (1987) #34–66, Annual (1988) #3–4; Thanos Quest (1990) #1-2; Infinity Gauntlet (1991) #1–6; material from Marvel Comics Presents (1988) #50, #69, #93-97	#53-85	1,384	3 Nov 2026	Ron Lim Infinity Gauntlet cover: 978-1302969837
3	Silver Surfer: The Infinity Gauntlet	1990-1992	Silver Surfer (1987) #34–66, Annual (1988) #3–4; Thanos Quest (1990) #1-2; Infinity Gauntlet (1991) #1–6; material from Marvel Comics Presents (1988) #50, #69, #93-97	#53-85	1,384	3 Nov 2026	Ron Lim Marvel Age DM cover: 978-1302969844
Jump to: Infinity Gauntlet
	Silver Surfer by Slott and Allred	2014-2017	Silver Surfer (2014) #1–15; Marvel NOW! Point One #1 (Silver Surfer story); Silver Surfer (2016) #1–14	#180-208	688	4 Dec 2018	Mike Allred cover: 978-1302913595
	Silver Surfer by Slott and Allred	2014-2017	Silver Surfer (2014) #1–15; Marvel NOW! Point One #1 (Silver Surfer story); Silver Surfer (2016) #1–14	#180-208	688	7 Mar 2023	Mike Allred Galactus cover: 978-1302945619
	Silver Surfer by Slott and Allred	2014-2017	Silver Surfer (2014) #1–15; Marvel NOW! Point One #1 (Silver Surfer story); Silver Surfer (2016) #1–14	#180-208	688	7 Mar 2023	Mike Allred Swirl DM cover: 978-1302945626

=== Spider-Gwen ===
#	Title	Years covered	Material collected	Pages	Released	ISBN
1	Spider-Gwen	2014-2018	Edge of Spider-Verse #2; Spider-Gwen (2015A) #1–5; Spider-Gwen (2015B) #1–34, Annual #1; All-New Wolverine Annual #1; Spider-Women Alpha and Omega; Silk (2015B) #7–8; Spider-Woman (2015) #6–7; Spider-Man (2016) #12–14	1,224	9 Jun 2021	Robbi Rodriguez cover: 978-1302930387
1	Spider-Gwen	2014-2018	Edge of Spider-Verse #2; Spider-Gwen (2015A) #1–5; Spider-Gwen (2015B) #1–34, Annual #1; All-New Wolverine Annual #1; Spider-Women Alpha and Omega; Silk (2015B) #7–8; Spider-Woman (2015) #6–7; Spider-Man (2016) #12–14	1,224	9 Jun 2021	Nick Bradshaw DM cover: 978-1302930394
2	Spider-Gwen: Ghost-Spider	2018-2021	Spider-Gwen: Ghost-Spider (2018) #1–10; Spider-Geddon: Ghost-Spider Video Comic (2018) #1; Ghost-Spider (2019) #1–10, Annual (2019) #1; King in Black: Gwenom vs. Carnage (2021) #1–3; Web-Warriors (2015) #1–11; material from Amazing Spider-Man (2015) #1	824	1 Aug 2023	Bengal cover: 978-1302946791
2	Spider-Gwen: Ghost-Spider	2018-2021	Spider-Gwen: Ghost-Spider (2018) #1–10; Spider-Geddon: Ghost-Spider Video Comic (2018) #1; Ghost-Spider (2019) #1–10, Annual (2019) #1; King in Black: Gwenom vs. Carnage (2021) #1–3; Web-Warriors (2015) #1–11; material from Amazing Spider-Man (2015) #1	824	1 Aug 2023	Inhyuk Lee DM cover: 978-1302951740

=== Spider-Man ===
- See also: Spider-Man collected editions

#	Title	Years covered	Material collected	Legacy	Pages	Released	ISBN
1	The Amazing Spider-Man Vol. 1	1962-1966	Amazing Fantasy #15; Amazing Spider-Man #1–38, Annual #1–2	#1-38	1,088	25 Apr 2007	Steve Ditko cover: 978-0785124023
1	The Amazing Spider-Man Vol. 1	1962-1966	Amazing Fantasy #15; Amazing Spider-Man #1–38, Annual #1–2	#1-38	1,088	25 Apr 2007	Alex Ross DM cover: 978-0785125099
1	The Amazing Spider-Man Vol. 1	1962-1966	Amazing Fantasy #15; Amazing Spider-Man #1–38, Annual #1–2	#1-38	1,088	28 Aug 2013	Steve Ditko cover: 978-0785185659
1	The Amazing Spider-Man Vol. 1	1962-1966	Amazing Fantasy #15; Amazing Spider-Man #1–38, Annual #1–2	#1-38	1,088	4 May 2016	Steve Ditko cover: 978-1302900823
1	The Amazing Spider-Man Vol. 1	1962-1966	Amazing Fantasy #15; Amazing Spider-Man #1–38, Annual #1–2	#1-38	1,088	12 Jun 2019	Steve Ditko cover: 978-1302919375
1	The Amazing Spider-Man Vol. 1	1962-1966	Material from Strange Tales Annual #2 and Fantastic Four Annual #1	#1-38	1,152	19 Jul 2022	Steve Ditko cover: 978-1302945633
1	The Amazing Spider-Man Vol. 1	1962-1966	Material from Strange Tales Annual #2 and Fantastic Four Annual #1	#1-38	1,152	19 Jul 2022	Alex Ross DM cover: 978-1302945633
	Untold Tales of Spider-Man	1995-1997	Amazing Fantasy (vol. 2) #16–18; Untold Tales of Spider-Man #1–25, -1, Annual (1996-97); Untold Tales of Spider-Man: Strange Encounter; material from Amazing Spider-Man Annual #37		808	25 Aug 2012	Pat Olliffe Villains cover: 978-0785162476
	Untold Tales of Spider-Man	1995-1997	Amazing Fantasy (vol. 2) #16–18; Untold Tales of Spider-Man #1–25, -1, Annual (1996-97); Untold Tales of Spider-Man: Strange Encounter; material from Amazing Spider-Man Annual #37		808	25 Aug 2012	Pat Olliffe Web-Shooter DM cover: 978-0785162483
	Untold Tales of Spider-Man	1995-1997	Amazing Fantasy (vol. 2) #16–18; Untold Tales of Spider-Man #1–25, -1, Annual (1996-97); Untold Tales of Spider-Man: Strange Encounter; material from Amazing Spider-Man Annual #37		808	11 May 2021	Pat Olliffe Villains cover: 978-1302928612
	Untold Tales of Spider-Man	1995-1997	Amazing Fantasy (vol. 2) #16–18; Untold Tales of Spider-Man #1–25, -1, Annual (1996-97); Untold Tales of Spider-Man: Strange Encounter; material from Amazing Spider-Man Annual #37		808	11 May 2021	Pat Olliffe Web-Shooter DM cover: 978-1302928629
2	The Amazing Spider-Man Vol. 2	1966-1968	Amazing Spider-Man #39–67, Annual #3–5; Spectacular Spider-Man magazine #1–2; material from Not Brand Echh #2, 6, 11	#39-67	968	18 Apr 2012	Humberto Ramos cover: 978-0785158578
2	The Amazing Spider-Man Vol. 2	1966-1968	Amazing Spider-Man #39–67, Annual #3–5; Spectacular Spider-Man magazine #1–2; material from Not Brand Echh #2, 6, 11	#39-67	968	18 Apr 2012	John Romita DM cover: 978-0785160144
2	The Amazing Spider-Man Vol. 2	1966-1968	Amazing Spider-Man #39–67, Annual #3–5; Spectacular Spider-Man magazine #1–2; material from Not Brand Echh #2, 6, 11	#39-67	968	28 Sep 2016	Humberto Ramos cover: 978-1302901806
2	The Amazing Spider-Man Vol. 2	1966-1968	Amazing Spider-Man #39–67, Annual #3–5; Spectacular Spider-Man magazine #1–2; material from Not Brand Echh #2, 6, 11	#39-67	968	5 Feb 2021	Humberto Ramos cover: 978-1302927943
2	The Amazing Spider-Man Vol. 2	1966-1968	Amazing Spider-Man #39–67, Annual #3–5; Spectacular Spider-Man magazine #1–2; material from Not Brand Echh #2, 6, 11	#39-67	968	5 Feb 2021	John Romita DM cover: 978-1302927950
3	The Amazing Spider-Man Vol. 3	1967-1972	Amazing Spider-Man #68–104, Annual #6–8 (covers only)	#68-104	920	17 May 2017	Mike McKone cover: 978-1302904081
3	The Amazing Spider-Man Vol. 3	1967-1972	Amazing Spider-Man #68–104, Annual #6–8 (covers only)	#68-104	920	17 May 2017	Gil Kane DM cover: 978-1302904524
3	The Amazing Spider-Man Vol. 3	1967-1972	Amazing Spider-Man #68–104, Annual #6–8 (covers only)	#68-104	920	22 Sep 2021	Mike McKone cover: 978-1302931391
3	The Amazing Spider-Man Vol. 3	1967-1972	Amazing Spider-Man #68–104, Annual #6–8 (covers only)	#68-104	920	22 Sep 2021	Gil Kane DM cover: 978-1302931407
4	The Amazing Spider-Man Vol. 4	1972-1975	Amazing Spider-Man #105–142, Annual #9 (cover only); Giant-Size Super-Heroes #1; Marvel Super-Heroes #14	#105-142	976	22 May 2019	Frank Cho cover: 978-1302915599
4	The Amazing Spider-Man Vol. 4	1972-1975	Amazing Spider-Man #105–142, Annual #9 (cover only); Giant-Size Super-Heroes #1; Marvel Super-Heroes #14	#105-142	976	22 May 2019	John Romita cover DM cover: 978-1302915605
4	The Amazing Spider-Man Vol. 4	1972-1975	Amazing Spider-Man #105–142, Annual #9 (cover only); Giant-Size Super-Heroes #1; Marvel Super-Heroes #14	#105-142	976	8 Aug 2023	Frank Cho cover: 978-1302952570
4	The Amazing Spider-Man Vol. 4	1972-1975	Amazing Spider-Man #105–142, Annual #9 (cover only); Giant-Size Super-Heroes #1; Marvel Super-Heroes #14	#105-142	976	8 Aug 2023	John Romita cover DM cover: 978-1302952587
1	Marvel Team-Up Vol. 1	1971-1975	Marvel Team-Up #1-30; Daredevil #103; Giant-Size Super-Heroes Featuring Spider-Man #1; Giant-Size Spider-Man #1-3		840	9 Dec 2025	Gil Kane cover: 978-1302966997
1	Marvel Team-Up Vol. 1	1971-1975	Marvel Team-Up #1-30; Daredevil #103; Giant-Size Super-Heroes Featuring Spider-Man #1; Giant-Size Spider-Man #1-3		840	9 Dec 2025	Jim Starlin DM cover: 978-1302967000
2	Marvel Team-Up Vol. 2	1975-1977	Marvel Team-Up #31-64, Annual #1; Giant-Size Spider-Man #4-5; Marvel Two-in-One #17; Marvel Comics Calendar 1975, 1976, 1977; material from Marvel Treasury Edition #13, Marvel Tales #255, 262-263		TBC	Jan 2027	Gil Kane cover: TBC
2	Marvel Team-Up Vol. 2	1975-1977	Marvel Team-Up #31-64, Annual #1; Giant-Size Spider-Man #4-5; Marvel Two-in-One #17; Marvel Comics Calendar 1975, 1976, 1977; material from Marvel Treasury Edition #13, Marvel Tales #255, 262-263		TBC	Jan 2027	Dave Cockrum DM cover: TBC
5	The Amazing Spider-Man Vol. 5	1975-1978	Amazing Spider-Man #143–180, Annual #10–11; Nova #12	#143-180	880	1 Sep 2021	Angel Medina cover: 978-1302926991
5	The Amazing Spider-Man Vol. 5	1975-1978	Amazing Spider-Man #143–180, Annual #10–11; Nova #12	#143-180	880	1 Sep 2021	Gil Kane DM cover: 978-1302927004
1	The Spectacular Spider-Man Vol. 1	1976-1980	Peter Parker, the Spectacular Spider-Man #1–42, Annual #1; Amazing Spider-Man Annual #13; Fantastic Four #218		928	23 Nov 2022	Sal Buscema cover: 978-1302947408
1	The Spectacular Spider-Man Vol. 1	1976-1980	Peter Parker, the Spectacular Spider-Man #1–42, Annual #1; Amazing Spider-Man Annual #13; Fantastic Four #218		928	23 Nov 2022	Dave Cockrum DM cover: 978-1302947415
6	The Amazing Spider-Man Vol. 6	1978-1980	Amazing Spider-Man #181–205, Annual #12–13; Spectacular Spider-Man Annual #1; What If? #1, 7, 19, material from #8	#181-205	792	11 Feb 2025	Keith Pollard cover: 978-1302962135
6	The Amazing Spider-Man Vol. 6	1978-1980	Amazing Spider-Man #181–205, Annual #12–13; Spectacular Spider-Man Annual #1; What If? #1, 7, 19, material from #8	#181-205	792	11 Feb 2025	Spider-Man vs Doc Ock DM cover: 978-1302962142
7	The Amazing Spider-Man Vol. 7	1980-1981	Amazing Spider-Man #206–223, Annual #14–15; Marvel Treasury Edition #25; material from What If...? #23-24, 30	#206–223	680	23 Jun 2026	John Romita Jr. cover: 978-1302968243
7	The Amazing Spider-Man Vol. 7	1980-1981	Amazing Spider-Man #206–223, Annual #14–15; Marvel Treasury Edition #25; material from What If...? #23-24, 30	#206–223	680	23 Jun 2026	Frank Miller DM cover: 978-1302968250
8	The Amazing Spider-Man Vol. 8	1981-1984	Amazing Spider-Man #224–251, Annual #16–17; Spectacular Spider-Man #85; Marvel Guide to Collecting Comics, the Official Marvel Try-Out Book	#224–251	952	1 Jun 2027	John Romita Jr. cover:978-1302971342
8	The Amazing Spider-Man Vol. 8	1981-1984	Amazing Spider-Man #224–251, Annual #16–17; Spectacular Spider-Man #85; Marvel Guide to Collecting Comics, the Official Marvel Try-Out Book	#224–251	952	1 Jun 2027	John Romita Jr. DM cover:978-1302971359
Jump to: Secret Wars (1984)
	Spider-Man: The Complete Black Costume Saga	1984-1985	Amazing Spider-Man #252–263, Annual #18; Marvel Team-Up #141–150, Annual #7; Peter Parker, the Spectacular Spider-Man #90–100, Annual #4; Web of Spider-Man #1	#252–263	992	24 Sep 2024	Ron Frenz cover: 978-1302959920
	Spider-Man: The Complete Black Costume Saga	1984-1985	Amazing Spider-Man #252–263, Annual #18; Marvel Team-Up #141–150, Annual #7; Peter Parker, the Spectacular Spider-Man #90–100, Annual #4; Web of Spider-Man #1	#252–263	992	24 Sep 2024	Charles Vess DM cover: 978-1302959937
1	Web of Spider-Man Vol. 1	1985-1987	Web of Spider-Man #1–34, Annual #1–3; Amazing Spider-Man #268, 293–295; Peter Parker, the Spectacular Spider-Man #131–133	#293–295	1,128	18 Mar 2025	Charles Vess cover: 978-1302963866
1	Web of Spider-Man Vol. 1	1985-1987	Web of Spider-Man #1–34, Annual #1–3; Amazing Spider-Man #268, 293–295; Peter Parker, the Spectacular Spider-Man #131–133	#293–295	1,128	18 Mar 2025	Mike Zeck DM cover: 978-1302963873
1	Web of Spider-Man Vol. 1	1985-1987	Web of Spider-Man #1–34, Annual #1–3; Amazing Spider-Man #268, 293–295; Peter Parker, the Spectacular Spider-Man #131–133	#293–295	1,128	18 Mar 2025	Greg Larocque DM cover: 978-1302964535
2	Web of Spider-Man Vol. 2	1987-1990	Web of Spider-Man #35–72, Annual #4-6; Amazing Spider-Man #312–313, 329; Spectacular Spider-Man #143, 146-147, 150-153, 158; Incredible Hulk #349	#312-313	1,360	12 May 2026	Bob Budiansky Hobgoblin cover: 978-1302968571
2	Web of Spider-Man Vol. 2	1987-1990	Web of Spider-Man #35–72, Annual #4-6; Amazing Spider-Man #312–313, 329; Spectacular Spider-Man #143, 146-147, 150-153, 158; Incredible Hulk #349	#312-313	1,360	12 May 2026	Alex Saviuk Spider-Hulk DM cover: 978-1302968588
	Amazing Spider-Man by David Michelinie & Todd McFarlane	1987-1989	Amazing Spider-Man #296–329; material from Spectacular Spider-Man Annual #10	#296–329	856	10 Aug 2011	Todd McFarlane cover: 978-0785157298
	Amazing Spider-Man by David Michelinie & Todd McFarlane	1987-1989	Amazing Spider-Man #296–329; material from Spectacular Spider-Man Annual #10	#296–329	856	3 Oct 2018	Todd McFarlane cover: 978-1302914141
	Amazing Spider-Man by David Michelinie & Todd McFarlane	1987-1989	Amazing Spider-Man #296–329; material from Spectacular Spider-Man Annual #10	#296–329	856	2 Sep 2021	Todd McFarlane cover: 978-1302928650
Jump to: Acts of Vengeance (#326-329)
	Spider-Man by David Michelinie and Erik Larsen	1989-1992	Amazing Spider-Man #287, 324, 327, 329–350; Spider-Man #15, 18, 19–20 (A-stories), 21–23; material from Marvel Comics Presents #48–50	#329–350	888	20 Jun 2017	Erik Larsen cover: 978-1302907020
	Spider-Man by David Michelinie and Erik Larsen	1989-1992	Amazing Spider-Man #287, 324, 327, 329–350; Spider-Man #15, 18, 19–20 (A-stories), 21–23; material from Marvel Comics Presents #48–50	#329–350	888	24 Sep 2024	Erik Larsen Boomerang cover: 978-1302959036
	Spider-Man by David Michelinie and Erik Larsen	1989-1992	Amazing Spider-Man #287, 324, 327, 329–350; Spider-Man #15, 18, 19–20 (A-stories), 21–23; material from Marvel Comics Presents #48–50	#329–350	888	24 Sep 2024	Erik Larsen Venom DM cover: 978-1302959043
	Spider-Man by Todd McFarlane	1990-1991	Spider-Man #1–14, 16; X-Force #4		440	16 Aug 2016	Todd McFarlane cover: 978-1302900731
	Spider-Man by Todd McFarlane	1990-1991	Spider-Man #1–14, 16; X-Force #4		440	7 Sep 2021	Todd McFarlane cover: 978-1302928391
	Spider-Man by Todd McFarlane	1990-1991	Spider-Man #1–14, 16; X-Force #4		440	7 Sep 2021	Todd McFarlane Black Costume cover: 978-1302928407
1	Spider-Man by Michelinie & Bagley Vol. 1	1991-1993	Amazing Spider-Man #351–375, Annual #25–26; material from Spectacular Spider-Man Annual #11–12; Web of Spider-Man Annual #7–8; New Warriors Annual #2	#351–375	1,048	11 Jun 2024	Mark Bagley Web cover: 978-1302956912
1	Spider-Man by Michelinie & Bagley Vol. 1	1991-1993	Amazing Spider-Man #351–375, Annual #25–26; material from Spectacular Spider-Man Annual #11–12; Web of Spider-Man Annual #7–8; New Warriors Annual #2	#351–375	1,048	11 Jun 2024	Mark Bagley Venom & Carnage DM cover: 978-1302956929
2	Spider-Man by Michelinie & Bagley Vol. 2	1993-1994	Amazing Spider-Man #376–393, Annual #27–28; Web of Spider-Man #101–103, 112; Spider-Man #35–37, 45; Spectacular Spider-Man #201–203, 211; Amazing Spider-Man Ashcan Edition; Venom: Lethal Protector #1–6; material from Spider-Man Unlimited (1993) #1–2	#376-393	1,128	8 Jul 2025	Mark Bagley Hulk cover: 978-1302964238
2	Spider-Man by Michelinie & Bagley Vol. 2	1993-1994	Amazing Spider-Man #376–393, Annual #27–28; Web of Spider-Man #101–103, 112; Spider-Man #35–37, 45; Spectacular Spider-Man #201–203, 211; Amazing Spider-Man Ashcan Edition; Venom: Lethal Protector #1–6; material from Spider-Man Unlimited (1993) #1–2	#376-393	1,128	8 Jul 2025	Mark Bagley Enemies DM cover: 978-1302964245
	Spectacular Spider-Man by DeMatteis & Buscema	1991-1994	Spectacular Spider-Man (vol. 2) #178–216, Spectacular Spider-Man Annual #12–14, Amazing Spider-Man: Soul of the Hunter		1,208	26 Aug 2025	Sal Buscema Green Goblin cover: 978-1302964467
	Spectacular Spider-Man by DeMatteis & Buscema	1991-1994	Spectacular Spider-Man (vol. 2) #178–216, Spectacular Spider-Man Annual #12–14, Amazing Spider-Man: Soul of the Hunter		1,208	26 Aug 2025	Sal Buscema Rhino DM cover: 978-1302964474
1	The Clone Saga Vol. 1	1994-1995	Web of Spider-Man #117–125; Amazing Spider-Man #394–401; Spider-Man #51–58; Spectacular Spider-Man (vol. 2) #217–224; Spider-Man Unlimited (1993) #7–9; Spider-Man: Funeral for an Octopus #1–3; Spider-Man: The Clone Journal; material from Spider-Man Collector's Preview (1994)	#394-401	1,240	16 Oct 2016	Mark Bagley cover: 978-1302902162
1	The Clone Saga Vol. 1	1994-1995	Web of Spider-Man #117–125; Amazing Spider-Man #394–401; Spider-Man #51–58; Spectacular Spider-Man (vol. 2) #217–224; Spider-Man Unlimited (1993) #7–9; Spider-Man: Funeral for an Octopus #1–3; Spider-Man: The Clone Journal; material from Spider-Man Collector's Preview (1994)	#394-401	1,240	30 Jan 2024	Mark Bagley cover: 978-1302952952
1	The Clone Saga Vol. 1	1994-1995	Web of Spider-Man #117–125; Amazing Spider-Man #394–401; Spider-Man #51–58; Spectacular Spider-Man (vol. 2) #217–224; Spider-Man Unlimited (1993) #7–9; Spider-Man: Funeral for an Octopus #1–3; Spider-Man: The Clone Journal; material from Spider-Man Collector's Preview (1994)	#394-401	1,240	30 Jan 2024	Ron Lim DM cover: 978-1302952969
2	The Clone Saga Vol. 2	1995	Amazing Spider-Man #402–406; Spider-Man #59–63; Spectacular Spider-Man (vol. 2) #225–229; Web of Spider-Man #126–129; Venom Super Special; New Warriors #61–66; Spider-Man: The Jackal Files; Spider-Man: Maximum Clonage Alpha, Omega; Spider-Man Unlimited (1993) #10; Spider-Man Team-Up #1; Spider-Man: The Lost Years #1–3; Spider-Man: The Parker Years	#402-406	1,288	14 Nov 2017	Sal Buscema cover: 978-1302907983
2	The Clone Saga Vol. 2	1995	Amazing Spider-Man #402–406; Spider-Man #59–63; Spectacular Spider-Man (vol. 2) #225–229; Web of Spider-Man #126–129; Venom Super Special; New Warriors #61–66; Spider-Man: The Jackal Files; Spider-Man: Maximum Clonage Alpha, Omega; Spider-Man Unlimited (1993) #10; Spider-Man Team-Up #1; Spider-Man: The Lost Years #1–3; Spider-Man: The Parker Years	#402-406	1,288	12 Mar 2024	Sal Buscema cover: 978-1302955847
2	The Clone Saga Vol. 2	1995	Amazing Spider-Man #402–406; Spider-Man #59–63; Spectacular Spider-Man (vol. 2) #225–229; Web of Spider-Man #126–129; Venom Super Special; New Warriors #61–66; Spider-Man: The Jackal Files; Spider-Man: Maximum Clonage Alpha, Omega; Spider-Man Unlimited (1993) #10; Spider-Man Team-Up #1; Spider-Man: The Lost Years #1–3; Spider-Man: The Parker Years	#402-406	1,288	12 Mar 2024	Mark Bagley DM cover: 978-1302955854
1	Spider-Man: Ben Reilly Vol. 1	1995-1996	Web of Scarlet Spider #1–4; Amazing Scarlet Spider #1–2; Scarlet Spider (1995) #1–2; Spectacular Scarlet Spider #1–2; Scarlet Spider Unlimited #1; Green Goblin #3; Sensational Spider-Man #0–3, Wizard mini-comic; Amazing Spider-Man #407–410, Annual '96; Spider-Man #64–67; New Warriors #67; Spectacular Spider-Man (vol. 2) #230–233; Spider-Man/Punisher: Family Plot #1–2; Spider-Man Holiday Special 1995; Spider-Man: The Final Adventure #1–4; Spider-Man Unlimited (1993) #11; Spider-Man Team-Up #2–3; material from Venom: Along Came a Spider #1–4	#407-410	1,304	15 Jan 2019	Steven Butler cover: 978-1302913854
1	Spider-Man: Ben Reilly Vol. 1	1995-1996		#407-410	1,304	26 Dec 2023	Steven Butler cover: 978-1302952884
1	Spider-Man: Ben Reilly Vol. 1	1995-1996		#407-410	1,304	26 Dec 2023	Dan Jurgens DM cover: 978-1302952891
2	Spider-Man: Ben Reilly Vol. 2	1996-1997	Sensational Spider-Man #4–11; Amazing Spider-Man #411–418; Spider-Man #68–75; Spectacular Spider-Man (vol. 2) #234–241; Spider-Man Unlimited (1993) #12–14; Spider-Man: Redemption #1–4; Daredevil #354; Spider-Man Team-Up #4–5; Spider-Man: Revelations trade paperback (1997); Spider-Man: The Osborn Journal; 101 Ways to End the Clone Saga; Dead Man's Hand	#411-418	1,304	23 Sep 2020	Luke Ross cover: 978-1302925208
2	Spider-Man: Ben Reilly Vol. 2	1996-1997	Sensational Spider-Man #4–11; Amazing Spider-Man #411–418; Spider-Man #68–75; Spectacular Spider-Man (vol. 2) #234–241; Spider-Man Unlimited (1993) #12–14; Spider-Man: Redemption #1–4; Daredevil #354; Spider-Man Team-Up #4–5; Spider-Man: Revelations trade paperback (1997); Spider-Man: The Osborn Journal; 101 Ways to End the Clone Saga; Dead Man's Hand	#411-418	1,304	6 Feb 2024	Luke Ross cover: 978-1302955823
2	Spider-Man: Ben Reilly Vol. 2	1996-1997	Sensational Spider-Man #4–11; Amazing Spider-Man #411–418; Spider-Man #68–75; Spectacular Spider-Man (vol. 2) #234–241; Spider-Man Unlimited (1993) #12–14; Spider-Man: Redemption #1–4; Daredevil #354; Spider-Man Team-Up #4–5; Spider-Man: Revelations trade paperback (1997); Spider-Man: The Osborn Journal; 101 Ways to End the Clone Saga; Dead Man's Hand	#411-418	1,304	6 Feb 2024	John Romita Jr. DM cover: 978-1302955830
1	Amazing Spider-Man by J. Michael Straczynski Vol. 1	2001-2004	Amazing Spider-Man (vol. 2) #30–58; Amazing Spider-Man #500–514	#471-514	1,120	30 May 2019	J Scott Campbell cover: 978-1302917067
1	Amazing Spider-Man by J. Michael Straczynski Vol. 1	2001-2004	Amazing Spider-Man (vol. 2) #30–58; Amazing Spider-Man #500–514	#471-514	1,120	24 May 2022	J Scott Campbell cover: 978-1302945442
1	Amazing Spider-Man by J. Michael Straczynski Vol. 1	2001-2004	Amazing Spider-Man (vol. 2) #30–58; Amazing Spider-Man #500–514	#471-514	1,120	24 May 2022	Mike Deodato DM cover: 978-1302945435
2	Amazing Spider-Man by J. Michael Straczynski Vol. 2	2004-2007	Amazing Spider-Man #515–545; Friendly Neighborhood Spider-Man #1–4, 24; Marvel Knights: Spider-Man #19–22; Sensational Spider-Man #41; Spider-Man: The Other Sketchbook #1; Spider-Man: One More Day Sketchbook	#515-545	1,136	1 Sep 2020	Mike Deodato Jr. cover: 978-1302923136
2	Amazing Spider-Man by J. Michael Straczynski Vol. 2	2004-2007	Amazing Spider-Man #515–545; Friendly Neighborhood Spider-Man #1–4, 24; Marvel Knights: Spider-Man #19–22; Sensational Spider-Man #41; Spider-Man: The Other Sketchbook #1; Spider-Man: One More Day Sketchbook	#515-545	1,136	1 Sep 2020	Ron Garney Black Suit DM cover: 978-1302924348
2	Amazing Spider-Man by J. Michael Straczynski Vol. 2	2004-2007	Amazing Spider-Man #515–545; Friendly Neighborhood Spider-Man #1–4, 24; Marvel Knights: Spider-Man #19–22; Sensational Spider-Man #41; Spider-Man: The Other Sketchbook #1; Spider-Man: One More Day Sketchbook	#515-545	1,136	6 Aug 2024	Mike Deodato Jr. cover: 978-1302957759
2	Amazing Spider-Man by J. Michael Straczynski Vol. 2	2004-2007	Amazing Spider-Man #515–545; Friendly Neighborhood Spider-Man #1–4, 24; Marvel Knights: Spider-Man #19–22; Sensational Spider-Man #41; Spider-Man: The Other Sketchbook #1; Spider-Man: One More Day Sketchbook	#515-545	1,136	6 Aug 2024	Ron Garney Black Suit DM cover: 978-1302957766
2	Amazing Spider-Man by J. Michael Straczynski Vol. 2	2004-2007	Amazing Spider-Man #515–545; Friendly Neighborhood Spider-Man #1–4, 24; Marvel Knights: Spider-Man #19–22; Sensational Spider-Man #41; Spider-Man: The Other Sketchbook #1; Spider-Man: One More Day Sketchbook	#515-545	1,136	6 Aug 2024	Joe Quesada DM cover: 978-1302957773
1	Brand New Day Vol. 1	2007-2009	FCBD 2007 (Spider-Man); Amazing Spider-Man #546–583, Annual (2008); Secret Invasion: The Amazing Spider-Man #1–3; Presidents' Day Celebration Digital Comic; Spider-Man: Fear Itself One-Shot; Amazing Spider-Man: Extra! #2; Spider-Man: Swing Shift Director's Cut One-Shot; material from Amazing Spider-Man: Extra! #1	#546-583	1,280	13 Aug 2024	Steve McNiven cover: 978-1302951757
1	Brand New Day Vol. 1	2007-2009	FCBD 2007 (Spider-Man); Amazing Spider-Man #546–583, Annual (2008); Secret Invasion: The Amazing Spider-Man #1–3; Presidents' Day Celebration Digital Comic; Spider-Man: Fear Itself One-Shot; Amazing Spider-Man: Extra! #2; Spider-Man: Swing Shift Director's Cut One-Shot; material from Amazing Spider-Man: Extra! #1	#546-583	1,280	13 Aug 2024	Phil Jiminez DM cover: 978-1302951764
2	Brand New Day Vol. 2	2009-2010	Amazing Spider-Man #584-611, Annual (2009) #36; Amazing Spider-Man: Extra! (2008) 1 (C-story), 3; Spider- Man: The Short Halloween #1 (2009); Spider-Man: A Chemical Romance Digital Comic (2009) #1; Spider-Man: The Root of All Annoyance Digital Comic (2009) #1; Dark Reign: Mr. Negative (2009) #1-3; Amazing Spider-Man Presents: Anti-Venom - New Ways to Live (2009) #1-3; Amazing Spider-Man Presents: Jackpot (2010) #1-3; Amazing Spider-Man Family (2008) #6-7 (A stories); Web of Spider-Man (2009) #1 (A-story)	#584-611	1,240	6 Jan 2026	John Romita Jr. cover: 978-1302965907
2	Brand New Day Vol. 2	2009-2010		#584-611	1,240	6 Jan 2026	J. Scott Campbell DM Cover: 978-1302967390
3	Brand New Day Vol. 3	2010	Amazing Spider-Man #612–647, Annual (2009) #37; Dark Reign: The List - Amazing Spider-Man; Amazing Spider-Man Presents: Black Cat (2010) #1-4; Many Loves of the Amazing Spider-Man; material from Web of Spider-Man (vol. 2) #2-7, 12; Spider-Man: Origin of the Hunter; Spider-Man: Grim Hunt - The Kraven Saga	#612–647	1,392	9 Jun 2026	Steve McNiven cover: 978-1302968861
3	Brand New Day Vol. 3	2010	Amazing Spider-Man #612–647, Annual (2009) #37; Dark Reign: The List - Amazing Spider-Man; Amazing Spider-Man Presents: Black Cat (2010) #1-4; Many Loves of the Amazing Spider-Man; material from Web of Spider-Man (vol. 2) #2-7, 12; Spider-Man: Origin of the Hunter; Spider-Man: Grim Hunt - The Kraven Saga	#612–647	1,392	9 Jun 2026	Paolo Rivera DM cover: 978-1302968878
1	Big Time Vol. 1	2010–2011	Amazing Spider-Man #648-673, 654.1; Free Comic Book Day 2011 (Spider-Man) 1; Venom (2011) #6-9; Spider-Island: Avengers #1; Spider-Island: Deadly Foes #1; Spider-Island: Heroes For Hire #1; Spider-Island: I Love New York City #1; Spider-Island: Spider-Woman #1; Spider-Island: Amazing Spider-Girl #1-3; Spider-Island: Cloak & Dagger #1-3; Spider-Island: Deadly Hands of Kung Fu #1-3; Herc #7-8; Black Panther: The Most Dangerous Man Alive #524; Spider-Island: Emergence of Evil - Jackal & Hobgoblin #1 (framing story).	#648–673	1,376	18 May 2027	Humberto Ramos cover:978-1302972431
1	Big Time Vol. 1	2010–2011		#648–673	1,376	18 May 2027	Marko Djurdjevic DM cover:978-1302972448
1	The Superior Spider-Man	2012-2014	The Amazing Spider-Man #698–700, The Superior Spider-Man #1–31, Annual #1–2	#698-731	960	6 Jun 2023	Ryan Stegman cover: 978-1302951078
1	The Superior Spider-Man	2012-2014	The Amazing Spider-Man #698–700, The Superior Spider-Man #1–31, Annual #1–2	#698-731	960	6 Jun 2023	Joe Quesada DM cover: 978-1302951085
2	Superior Spider-Man Returns	2013-2024	Avenging Spider-Man (2011) #15.1, #16-22; Superior Spider-Man Team-Up (2013) #1-12; Superior Spider-Man (2013) #6AU, #32-33; Daredevil (2011) #22; Scarlet Spider (2012) #20; All-New X-Men Special (2013) #1; Indestructible Hulk Special (2013) #1; Superior Spider-Man Team-Up Special (2013) #1; Inhumanity: Superior Spider-Man (2014) #1; Superior Octopus (2018) #1 (A-story); Superior Spider-Man (2018) #1-12; Superior Spider-Man Returns (2023); Superior Spider-Man (2023) #1-8; Amazing Spider-Man (2022) #31 (Superior Spider-Man story)	#740-741	1,264	13 Jan 2026	Mark Bagley cover: 978-1302963606
2	Superior Spider-Man Returns	2013-2024		#740-741	1,264	13 Jan 2026	Mike Del Mundo DM cover: 978-1302963613
Jump to: Spider-Verse / Spider-Geddon (#740-748)
1	Amazing Spider-Man by Nick Spencer Vol. 1	2018-2020	Amazing Spider-Man (vol.5) #1–43, 16.HU and 18.HU–20.HU; Amazing Spider-Man: Full Circle; material from FCBD 2018 (Amazing Spider-Man/Guardians of the Galaxy)	#802-844	1,328	10 Jan 2023	Ryan Ottley cover: 978-1302946098
1	Amazing Spider-Man by Nick Spencer Vol. 1	2018-2020	Amazing Spider-Man (vol.5) #1–43, 16.HU and 18.HU–20.HU; Amazing Spider-Man: Full Circle; material from FCBD 2018 (Amazing Spider-Man/Guardians of the Galaxy)	#802-844	1,328	10 Jan 2023	Ryan Ottley DM cover: 978-1302946104
2	Amazing Spider-Man by Nick Spencer Vol. 2	2020-2021	Amazing Spider-Man (vol. 5) #44–73, 74 (A- and B-stories) and #50.LR–54.LR; Amazing Spider-Man: Sins Rising Prelude; Amazing Spider-Man: The Sins of Norman Osborn; Giant-Size Amazing Spider-Man: King's Random; Giant-Size Amazing Spider-Man: The Chameleon Conspiracy; Sinister War #1–4	#845-875	1,336	4 Jun 2024	Ryan Ottley cover: 978-1302953645
2	Amazing Spider-Man by Nick Spencer Vol. 2	2020-2021	Amazing Spider-Man (vol. 5) #44–73, 74 (A- and B-stories) and #50.LR–54.LR; Amazing Spider-Man: Sins Rising Prelude; Amazing Spider-Man: The Sins of Norman Osborn; Giant-Size Amazing Spider-Man: King's Random; Giant-Size Amazing Spider-Man: The Chameleon Conspiracy; Sinister War #1–4	#845-875	1,336	4 Jun 2024	Patrick Gleason DM cover: 978-1302953652
2	Amazing Spider-Man by Nick Spencer Vol. 2	2020-2021	Amazing Spider-Man (vol. 5) #44–73, 74 (A- and B-stories) and #50.LR–54.LR; Amazing Spider-Man: Sins Rising Prelude; Amazing Spider-Man: The Sins of Norman Osborn; Giant-Size Amazing Spider-Man: King's Random; Giant-Size Amazing Spider-Man: The Chameleon Conspiracy; Sinister War #1–4	#845-875	1,336	4 Jun 2024	Arthur Adams DM cover: 978-1302954130
	Amazing Spider-Man: Beyond	2021-2022	Amazing Spider-Man (vol. 5) #75–93, 78.BEY, 80.BEY, 88.BEY, 92.BEY, 74 (Ben Reilly story); FCBD 2021: Spider-Man/Venom (Spider-Man story); Mary Jane & Black Cat: Beyond	#876-894	672	6 Jun 2023	Arthur Adams Ben Reilly DM cover: 978-1302949624
	Amazing Spider-Man: Beyond	2021-2022	Amazing Spider-Man (vol. 5) #75–93, 78.BEY, 80.BEY, 88.BEY, 92.BEY, 74 (Ben Reilly story); FCBD 2021: Spider-Man/Venom (Spider-Man story); Mary Jane & Black Cat: Beyond	#876-894	672	6 Jun 2023	Arthur Adams Kraven the Hunter DM cover: 978-1302949631
	Amazing Spider-Man: Beyond	2021-2022	Amazing Spider-Man (vol. 5) #75–93, 78.BEY, 80.BEY, 88.BEY, 92.BEY, 74 (Ben Reilly story); FCBD 2021: Spider-Man/Venom (Spider-Man story); Mary Jane & Black Cat: Beyond	#876-894	672	6 Jun 2023	Humberto Ramos MJ & Black Cat DM cover: 978-1302949648
1	Spider-Man by Zeb Wells Vol. 1	2022-2023	Amazing Spider-Man (vol. 6) #1-26; Dark Web #1; Dark Web Finale #1; FCBD 2022: Spider-Man/Venom (Spider-Man story); Amazing Spider-Man Annual (2023); Fallen Friend: The Death of Ms. Marvel #1	#895-920	888	10 Feb 2026	John Romita Jr. cover: 978-1302966515
1	Spider-Man by Zeb Wells Vol. 1	2022-2023	Amazing Spider-Man (vol. 6) #1-26; Dark Web #1; Dark Web Finale #1; FCBD 2022: Spider-Man/Venom (Spider-Man story); Amazing Spider-Man Annual (2023); Fallen Friend: The Death of Ms. Marvel #1	#895-920	888	10 Feb 2026	Benjamin Su DM cover: 978-1302966522
2	Spider-Man by Zeb Wells Vol. 2	2023-2024	Amazing Spider-Man (vol. 6) #27-66; Amazing Spider-Man: Gang War First Strike; material from FCBD 2023: Spider-Man/Venom; FCBD 2024: Spider-Man/Ultimate Universe; Web of Spider-Man (2024) #1	#921-960	1,032	11 Aug 2026	John Romita Jr. cover: 978-1302966638
2	Spider-Man by Zeb Wells Vol. 2	2023-2024	Amazing Spider-Man (vol. 6) #27-66; Amazing Spider-Man: Gang War First Strike; material from FCBD 2023: Spider-Man/Venom; FCBD 2024: Spider-Man/Ultimate Universe; Web of Spider-Man (2024) #1	#921-960	1,032	11 Aug 2026	Ed McGuinness DM cover: 978-1302966645
Jump to: Dark Web (#908-912)
	Spider-Man: Gang War	2023-2024	Amazing Spider-Man (vol. 6) #39-44; Amazing Spider-Man: Gang War First Strike; Daredevil: Gang War #1-4; Deadly Hands of Kung-Fu: Gang War #1-3; Jackpot (2024); Luke Cage: Gang War #1-4; Miles Morales: Spider-Man (2022) #13-16; Spider-Woman (2023) #1-4	#933-938	680	19 Aug 2025	John Romita Jr. cover: 978-1302961824
	Spider-Man: Gang War	2023-2024	Amazing Spider-Man (vol. 6) #39-44; Amazing Spider-Man: Gang War First Strike; Daredevil: Gang War #1-4; Deadly Hands of Kung-Fu: Gang War #1-3; Jackpot (2024); Luke Cage: Gang War #1-4; Miles Morales: Spider-Man (2022) #13-16; Spider-Woman (2023) #1-4	#933-938	680	19 Aug 2025	Ryan Stegman DM cover: 978-1302961992
These creator-focused omnibuses jump around eras
	Spider-Man by Roger Stern	1980-1984	Amazing Spider-Man #206, 224–252; Annual #16–17; Peter Parker, the Spectacular Spider-Man #43–61, 85	#224-252	1,296	26 Mar 2014	John Romita Jr. Hobgoblin cover: 978-0785188278
	Spider-Man by Roger Stern	1980-1984	Amazing Spider-Man #206, 224–252; Annual #16–17; Peter Parker, the Spectacular Spider-Man #43–61, 85	#224-252	1,296	4 May 2021	John Romita Jr. Hobgoblin cover: 978-0785188278
	Spider-Man by Roger Stern	1980-1984	Amazing Spider-Man #206, 224–252; Annual #16–17; Peter Parker, the Spectacular Spider-Man #43–61, 85	#224-252	1,296	4 May 2021	John Romita Jr. Hobgoblin Unmasked DM cover: 978-1302928384
	Spider-Man by John Byrne	1977-2000	Amazing Spider-Man #189–190, 206, Annual #13; Peter Parker, the Spectacular Spider-Man #58; Spider-Man: Chapter One #0–12; Marvel Team-Up #53–55, 59–70, 75; Amazing Spider-Man (vol. 2) #1 (A- and C-stories), 2–11, 12 (A-story) 13–18; Marvel Authentix: Amazing Spider-Man #1		1,264	3 Sep 2019	John Byrne cover: 978-1302919528
	Spider-Man by Joe Kelly	2008-2022	Amazing Spider-Man #575–576, 595–599, 606–607, 611, 617, 625; Non-Stop Spider-Man (2021) #1–5; Savage Spider-Man (2022) #1–5; Marvel Fanfare (1996) #2–3; Webspinners: Tales of Spider-Man (1999) #7–9; material from Amazing Spider-Man: Extra! (2008) #1, 3; Amazing Spider-Man #577, 600, 612, 634–637, 647; Spider-Man: Grim Hunt - The Kraven Saga (2010)		880	14 Jan 2025	Ken Lashley cover: 978-1302951931
	Spider-Man by Joe Kelly	2008-2022	Amazing Spider-Man #575–576, 595–599, 606–607, 611, 617, 625; Non-Stop Spider-Man (2021) #1–5; Savage Spider-Man (2022) #1–5; Marvel Fanfare (1996) #2–3; Webspinners: Tales of Spider-Man (1999) #7–9; material from Amazing Spider-Man: Extra! (2008) #1, 3; Amazing Spider-Man #577, 600, 612, 634–637, 647; Spider-Man: Grim Hunt - The Kraven Saga (2010)		880	14 Jan 2025	Phil Jimenez DM cover: 978-1302951948
	Spider-Man by Chip Zdarsky	2017-2021	Peter Parker: The Spectacular Spider-Man (vol. 3) #1–6, #297–310, Annual (2018); FCBD 2017: Secret Empire (Spider-Man story); Spider-Man: Life Story #1–6, Annual (2021); Spider-Man: Spider's Shadow #1–5		928	12 Dec 2023	Adam Kubert cover: 978-1302952983
	Spider-Man by Chip Zdarsky	2017-2021	Peter Parker: The Spectacular Spider-Man (vol. 3) #1–6, #297–310, Annual (2018); FCBD 2017: Secret Empire (Spider-Man story); Spider-Man: Life Story #1–6, Annual (2021); Spider-Man: Spider's Shadow #1–5		928	12 Dec 2023	Paulo Siqueira DM cover: 978-1302952990
	Spider-Man by Chip Zdarsky	2017-2021	Peter Parker: The Spectacular Spider-Man (vol. 3) #1–6, #297–310, Annual (2018); FCBD 2017: Secret Empire (Spider-Man story); Spider-Man: Life Story #1–6, Annual (2021); Spider-Man: Spider's Shadow #1–5		928	12 Dec 2023	Chip Zdarsky DM cover: 978-1302955922
	Spider-Man by Chip Zdarsky	2017-2021	Peter Parker: The Spectacular Spider-Man (vol. 3) #1–6, #297–310, Annual (2018); FCBD 2017: Secret Empire (Spider-Man story); Spider-Man: Life Story #1–6, Annual (2021); Spider-Man: Spider's Shadow #1–5		928	15 Sep 2026	Adam Kubert cover: 978-1302969974
	Spider-Man by Chip Zdarsky	2017-2021	Peter Parker: The Spectacular Spider-Man (vol. 3) #1–6, #297–310, Annual (2018); FCBD 2017: Secret Empire (Spider-Man story); Spider-Man: Life Story #1–6, Annual (2021); Spider-Man: Spider's Shadow #1–5		928	15 Sep 2026	DM cover: TBC
Other Spider-Man series
	Spider-Man's Tangled Web	2001-2003	Tangled Web #1-4; Spider-Man's Tangled Web #5-22		560	27 Jun 2017	978-1302906825
	The Superior Foes of Spider-Man	2013-2014	The Superior Foes of Spider-Man #1-17		376	16 Feb 2016	978-0785198376
	Symbiote Spider-Man by Peter David	2019-2024	Symbiote Spider-Man (2019) #1-5; Symbiote Spider-Man: Alien Reality #1-5; Symbiote Spider-Man: King in Black #1-5; Symbiote Spider-Man: Crossroads #1-5; Symbiote Spider-Man 2099 (2024) #1-5		632	12 Aug 2025	Greg Land cover: 978-1302961947
	Symbiote Spider-Man by Peter David	2019-2024	Symbiote Spider-Man (2019) #1-5; Symbiote Spider-Man: Alien Reality #1-5; Symbiote Spider-Man: King in Black #1-5; Symbiote Spider-Man: Crossroads #1-5; Symbiote Spider-Man 2099 (2024) #1-5		632	12 Aug 2025	Nick Bradshaw DM cover: 978-1302961954
Jump to: Ultimate Spider-Man
Jump to: Miles Morales: Spider-Man
Jump to: Spider-Man 2099

=== Spider-Woman ===
#	Title	Years covered	Material collected	Legacy	Pages	Released	ISBN
	Spider-Woman	1976-1984	Marvel Spotlight #32; Marvel Two-in-One #29-33; Spider-Woman #1-50; Avengers #240-241, Annual #10; material from What If? #17	#1-50	1,320	24 Nov 2026	Joe Sinnott cover: 978-1302968526
	Spider-Woman	1976-1984	Marvel Spotlight #32; Marvel Two-in-One #29-33; Spider-Woman #1-50; Avengers #240-241, Annual #10; material from What If? #17	#1-50	1,320	24 Nov 2026	Steve Leialoha DM cover: 978-1302968533

=== Squadron Supreme ===
#	Title	Years covered	Material collected	Pages	Released	ISBN
	Squadron Supreme by Mark Gruenwald	1985-1989	Squadron Supreme #1–12; Captain America #314; Marvel Graphic Novel No. 55 – Squadron Supreme: Death of a Universe	448	3 Nov 2010	Alex Ross cover: 978-0785184690
	Squadron Supreme by Mark Gruenwald	1985-1989	Squadron Supreme #1–12; Captain America #314; Marvel Graphic Novel No. 55 – Squadron Supreme: Death of a Universe	448	3 Nov 2010	Bob Hall DM cover: 978-0785149866
	Squadron Supreme Classic	1969-2007	Avengers (1963) #69–70, 85–86, 141–144, 147–149; Thor (1966) #280; Defenders (1972) #112–114; Squadron Supreme (1985) #1–12; Captain America (1968) #314; Marvel Graphic Novel No. 55 – Squadron Supreme: Death of a Universe; Quasar #13–16, 51–52; Avengers (1998) #5–6; Avengers/Squadron Supreme Annual 1998; Squadron Supreme: New World Order; Exiles (2001) #77–78; Ultimate Power #7–9	1,240	14 Jun 2016	George Perez cover: 978-1302900656

=== Squirrel Girl ===
The Unbeatable Squirrel Girl omnibus contains the full 58-issue run of the comic, written by Ryan North, with art from Erica Henderson. The series begins with the superheroine starting college, before quickly having to face down planet-wide threats.

#	Title	Years covered	Material collected	Pages	Released	ISBN
	The Unbeatable Squirrel Girl	2015-2019	The Unbeatable Squirrel Girl (2015A) #1–8, The Unbeatable Squirrel Girl (2015B) #1–50, The Unbeatable Squirrel Girl Beats Up the Marvel Universe (2016), Howard the Duck (2015B) #6; material from A Year of Marvels: Unbeatable (2016) #1 and Not Brand Echh (2017) #14	1,616	21 Mar 2023	Erica Henderson cover: 978-1302950613
	The Unbeatable Squirrel Girl	2015-2019	The Unbeatable Squirrel Girl (2015A) #1–8, The Unbeatable Squirrel Girl (2015B) #1–50, The Unbeatable Squirrel Girl Beats Up the Marvel Universe (2016), Howard the Duck (2015B) #6; material from A Year of Marvels: Unbeatable (2016) #1 and Not Brand Echh (2017) #14	1,616	21 Mar 2023	Art Adams DM cover: 978-1302950606

=== Strange Academy ===
#	Title	Years covered	Material collected	Pages	Released	ISBN
	Strange Academy	2020-2022	Strange Academy (2020) #1–18, Strange Academy: Finals (2022) #1–6	592	6 May 2025	Humberto Ramos cover: 978-1302961343
	Strange Academy	2020-2022	Strange Academy (2020) #1–18, Strange Academy: Finals (2022) #1–6	592	6 May 2025	Skottie Young DM cover: 978-1302961350
Jump to: Doctor Strange

=== The Thing ===
#	Title	Years covered	Material collected	Pages	Released	ISBN
1	Marvel Two-in-One Vol. 1	1973-1977	Marvel Feature (1971) #11–12; Marvel Two-in-One (1974) #1–36; Marvel Two-in-One Annual #1; Marvel Team-Up (1972) #47; Fantastic Four Annual (1963) #11	888	17 Jun 2025	Gil Kane cover: 978-1302964672
1	Marvel Two-in-One Vol. 1	1973-1977	Marvel Feature (1971) #11–12; Marvel Two-in-One (1974) #1–36; Marvel Two-in-One Annual #1; Marvel Team-Up (1972) #47; Fantastic Four Annual (1963) #11	888	17 Jun 2025	John Buscema DM cover: 978-1302964689
	The Thing	1983-1991	Thing #1–36; Fantastic Four #274, 277, 296; Secret Wars II #7; West Coast Avengers (1985) #10; Questprobe #3; Marvel Tales #198; Marvel Graphic Novel No. 29 – The Incredible Hulk and the Thing: The Big Change; material from Marvel Fanfare #15 and Marvel Super Heroes #5	1,160	13 Dec 2022	John Byrne cover: 978-1302945787
	The Thing	1983-1991	Thing #1–36; Fantastic Four #274, 277, 296; Secret Wars II #7; West Coast Avengers (1985) #10; Questprobe #3; Marvel Tales #198; Marvel Graphic Novel No. 29 – The Incredible Hulk and the Thing: The Big Change; material from Marvel Fanfare #15 and Marvel Super Heroes #5	1,160	13 Dec 2022	Ron Wilson DM cover: 978-1302945794
Jump to: Fantastic Four

=== Thor ===
#	Title	Years covered	Material collected	Legacy	Pages	Released	ISBN
Thor legacy numbering starts at #83
1	The Mighty Thor Vol. 1	1962-1965	Journey Into Mystery #83–120, Annual #1	#83-120	768	5 Jan 2011	Olivier Coipel cover: 978-0785149736
1	The Mighty Thor Vol. 1	1962-1965	Journey Into Mystery #83–120, Annual #1	#83-120	768	5 Jan 2011	Jack Kirby DM cover: 978-0785150992
1	The Mighty Thor Vol. 1	1962-1965	Journey Into Mystery #83–120, Annual #1	#83-120	768	1 Dec 2021	Olivier Coipel cover: 978-1302932466
1	The Mighty Thor Vol. 1	1962-1965	Journey Into Mystery #83–120, Annual #1	#83-120	768	1 Dec 2021	Jack Kirby DM cover: 978-1302932473
2	The Mighty Thor Vol. 2	1965-1968	Journey into Mystery #121–125; Thor #126–152, Annual #2; material from Not Brand Echh #3	#121-152	792	27 Aug 2013	Esad Ribić cover: 978-0785167839
2	The Mighty Thor Vol. 2	1965-1968	Journey into Mystery #121–125; Thor #126–152, Annual #2; material from Not Brand Echh #3	#121-152	792	27 Aug 2013	Jack Kirby DM cover: 978-0785168133
3	The Mighty Thor Vol. 3	1968-1971	Thor #153–194	#153-194	1,000	3 Oct 2017	Russell Dauterman cover: 978-1302903817
3	The Mighty Thor Vol. 3	1968-1971	Thor #153–194	#153-194	1,000	3 Oct 2017	Jack Kirby DM cover: 978-1302903824
4	The Mighty Thor Vol. 4	1972-1974	Thor #195–228; material from Marvel Treasury Edition #3	#195-228	784	16 May 2023	Gil Kane cover: 978-1302949822
4	The Mighty Thor Vol. 4	1972-1974	Thor #195–228; material from Marvel Treasury Edition #3	#195-228	784	16 May 2023	John Buscema DM cover: 978-1302949839
5	The Mighty Thor Vol. 5	1974-1977	Thor #229–266, Annual #5-6; Marvel Spotlight #30; Marvel Premiere #26	#229-266	904	9 Sep 2025	Gil Kane cover: 978-1302962470
5	The Mighty Thor Vol. 5	1974-1977	Thor #229–266, Annual #5-6; Marvel Spotlight #30; Marvel Premiere #26	#229-266	904	9 Sep 2025	John Buscema DM cover: 978-1302962487
	Thor by Walter Simonson	1983-1987	Thor (1966) #337–355, 357–369, 371–382; Balder the Brave #1–4	#337-355, #357–369, #371–382	1,192	16 Mar 2011	Simonson Thor & Balder the Brave cover: 978-0785146339
	Thor by Walter Simonson	1983-1987	Thor (1966) #337–355, 357–369, 371–382; Balder the Brave #1–4	#337-355, #357–369, #371–382	1,192	16 Mar 2011	Walter Simonson DM cover: 978-0785146346
	Thor by Walter Simonson	1983-1987	Thor (1966) #337–355, 357–369, 371–382; Balder the Brave #1–4	#337-355, #357–369, #371–382	1,192	17 Oct 2017	Simonson Thor & Balder the Brave cover: 978-1302908874
	Thor by Walter Simonson	1983-1987	Thor (1966) #337–355, 357–369, 371–382; Balder the Brave #1–4	#337-355, #357–369, #371–382	1,192	12 Jun 2024	Simonson Thor & Balder the Brave cover: 978-1302957612
	Thor by Walter Simonson	1983-1987	Thor (1966) #337–355, 357–369, 371–382; Balder the Brave #1–4	#337-355, #357–369, #371–382	1,192	12 Jun 2024	Walter Simonson DM cover: 978-1302957629
Thor legacy number #356 is a Hercules story instead of a Thor story. Thor legacy number #370 can be found in: Black Panther by Christopher Priest Vol. 2
1	Thor: Heroes Return Vol. 1	1998-2001	Thor (vol. 2) #1–35, Rough Cut; Silver Surfer/Thor Annual 1998; Annual 1999 and Annual 2000; Peter Parker: Spider-Man (1999) #2, 11; Iron Man (1998) #21 (B-story), #22; Juggernaut: The Eighth Day	#503-537	1,232	4 Oct 2017	John Romita Jr. cover: 978-1302908133
2	Thor: Heroes Return Vol. 2	2001-2004	Thor (vol. 2) #36–85, Annual (2001); Iron Man (1998) #64; Avengers (1998) #63; material from Marvel Knights Double-Shot #1	#538-587	1,304	3 Oct 2018	Scott Eaton cover: 978-1302913618
	Thor by J. Michael Straczynski	2006-2009	Fantastic Four #536–537; Thor (vol. 3) #1–12, 600–603; Thor Giant-Size Finale	#588-603	520	3 Nov 2010	Olivier Coipel cover: 978-0785140290
	Thor by J. Michael Straczynski	2006-2009	Fantastic Four #536–537; Thor (vol. 3) #1–12, 600–603; Thor Giant-Size Finale	#588-603	520	3 Nov 2010	Michael Turner DM cover: 978-0785149569
	Thor by Straczynski & Gillen	2006-2010	Fantastic Four #536–537; Thor (vol. 3) #1–12, 600–614, Annual #1; Thor Giant-Size Finale; Siege #1–4, #1 Director's Cut; Siege: Loki #1; New Mutants (2009) #11; Secret Invasion Aftermath: Beta Ray Bill - The Green of Eden; Beta Ray Bill: Godhunter #1–3; material from Dark Reign: The Cabal	#588-614	1,144	23 Jan 2024	Olivier Coipel cover: 978-1302953010
	Thor by Straczynski & Gillen	2006-2010	Fantastic Four #536–537; Thor (vol. 3) #1–12, 600–614, Annual #1; Thor Giant-Size Finale; Siege #1–4, #1 Director's Cut; Siege: Loki #1; New Mutants (2009) #11; Secret Invasion Aftermath: Beta Ray Bill - The Green of Eden; Beta Ray Bill: Godhunter #1–3; material from Dark Reign: The Cabal	#588-614	1,144	23 Jan 2024	Michael Turner DM cover: 978-1302953027
	Thor by Matt Fraction	2008-2012	Thor: Ages of Thunder, Reign of Blood, Man of War; Secret Invasion: Thor #1–3; Thor God-Size Special #1; FCBD 2010: Iron Man/Thor; Thor #615–621, 620.1; The Mighty Thor (2011) #1–22, 12.1, Annual #1; Fear Itself #1–7, 7.2: Thor; Journey into Mystery #642–644	#615-643	1,352	7 Jun 2022	Olivier Coipel cover: 978-1302934811
	Thor by Matt Fraction	2008-2012	Thor: Ages of Thunder, Reign of Blood, Man of War; Secret Invasion: Thor #1–3; Thor God-Size Special #1; FCBD 2010: Iron Man/Thor; Thor #615–621, 620.1; The Mighty Thor (2011) #1–22, 12.1, Annual #1; Fear Itself #1–7, 7.2: Thor; Journey into Mystery #642–644	#615-643	1,352	7 Jun 2022	Joe Quesada DM cover: 978-1302934811
1	Thor by Jason Aaron Vol. 1	2012-2016	Thor: God of Thunder #1–25; Thor (vol. 4) #1–8, Annual #1; Thors #1–4; The Mighty Thor (2015) #1–12	#644-688	1,216	26 Apr 2022	Esad Ribić cover: 978-1302934859
1	Thor by Jason Aaron Vol. 1	2012-2016	Thor: God of Thunder #1–25; Thor (vol. 4) #1–8, Annual #1; Thors #1–4; The Mighty Thor (2015) #1–12	#644-688	1,216	26 Apr 2022	Russell Dauterman DM cover: 978-1302934866
1	Thor by Jason Aaron Vol. 1	2012-2016	Thor: God of Thunder #1–25; Thor (vol. 4) #1–8, Annual #1; Thors #1–4; The Mighty Thor (2015) #1–12	#644-688	1,216	26 Apr 2022	Joe Quesada DM cover: 978-1302934941
2	Thor by Jason Aaron Vol. 2	2016-2019	Mighty Thor (2015) #13–23, 700–702, 703 (A-story), 704–706; Unworthy Thor #1–5; Generations: The Unworthy Thor & the Mighty Thor #1; Mighty Thor: At the Gates of Valhalla #1; Thor (vol. 5) #1–16; War of the Realms #1–6; King Thor #1–4	#689-726	1,368	26 Oct 2023	Russell Dauterman cover: 978-1302953850
2	Thor by Jason Aaron Vol. 2	2016-2019	Mighty Thor (2015) #13–23, 700–702, 703 (A-story), 704–706; Unworthy Thor #1–5; Generations: The Unworthy Thor & the Mighty Thor #1; Mighty Thor: At the Gates of Valhalla #1; Thor (vol. 5) #1–16; War of the Realms #1–6; King Thor #1–4	#689-726	1,368	26 Oct 2023	Olivier Coipel DM cover: 978-1302953867
	Thor by Cates & Klein	2020-2023	Thor (vol. ) #1–35, Annual (2021) #1 (A-story), Annual (2023) (A-story); Hulk vs. Thor: Banner of War Alpha #1; Hulk (2021) #7–8; Thanos: Death Notes #1	#727-761	1,040	29 Oct 2024	Nic Klein Thor cover: 978-1302958541
	Thor by Cates & Klein	2020-2023	Thor (vol. ) #1–35, Annual (2021) #1 (A-story), Annual (2023) (A-story); Hulk vs. Thor: Banner of War Alpha #1; Hulk (2021) #7–8; Thanos: Death Notes #1	#727-761	1,040	29 Oct 2024	Nic Klein Team DM cover: 978-1302958565

=== Thunderbolts ===
#	Title	Years covered	Material collected	Legacy	Pages	Released	ISBN
1	Thunderbolts Vol. 1	1997-1999	Thunderbolts (1997) #0–33, Annual 1997; Thunderbolts: Distant Rumblings #-1; Incredible Hulk (1968) #449; Spider-Man Team-Up #7; Heroes for Hire (1997) #7; Captain America/Citizen V Annual 1998; Avengers (1998) #12; material from Tales of the Marvel Universe #1	#1-33	1,136	7 Apr 2021	Mark Bagley First Issue cover: 978-1302927073
1	Thunderbolts Vol. 1	1997-1999	Thunderbolts (1997) #0–33, Annual 1997; Thunderbolts: Distant Rumblings #-1; Incredible Hulk (1968) #449; Spider-Man Team-Up #7; Heroes for Hire (1997) #7; Captain America/Citizen V Annual 1998; Avengers (1998) #12; material from Tales of the Marvel Universe #1	#1-33	1,136	7 Apr 2021	Mark Bagley Annual DM cover: 978-1302927080
2	Thunderbolts Vol. 2	2000-2002, 2011	Thunderbolts (1997) #34–63, Annual 2000; Avengers (1998) #31–34, Annual 2000; Thunderbolts: Life Sentences (2001) #1; Thunderbolts: From the Marvel Vault (2011) #1; Citizen V and the V-Battalion (2001) #1-3; Citizen V and the V-Battalion: The Everlasting (2002) #1–4	#34-63	1,168	7 Jun 2022	Mark Bagley cover: 978-1302931896
2	Thunderbolts Vol. 2	2000-2002, 2011	Thunderbolts (1997) #34–63, Annual 2000; Avengers (1998) #31–34, Annual 2000; Thunderbolts: Life Sentences (2001) #1; Thunderbolts: From the Marvel Vault (2011) #1; Citizen V and the V-Battalion (2001) #1-3; Citizen V and the V-Battalion: The Everlasting (2002) #1–4	#34-63	1,168	7 Jun 2022	Patrick Zircher DM cover: 978-1302931902
3	Thunderbolts Vol. 3	2002-2007	Thunderbolts (1997) #64–75, 100–109; Avengers/Thunderbolts (2004) #1–6; New Thunderbolts (2004) #1–18; Thunderbolts Presents: Zemo - Born Better (2007) #1–4	#64-75, #82-109	1,216	2 May 2023	Tom Grummett New Thunderbolts cover: 978-1-302950378
3	Thunderbolts Vol. 3	2002-2007	Thunderbolts (1997) #64–75, 100–109; Avengers/Thunderbolts (2004) #1–6; New Thunderbolts (2004) #1–18; Thunderbolts Presents: Zemo - Born Better (2007) #1–4	#64-75, #82-109	1,216	2 May 2023	Tom Grummett Civil War DM cover: 978-1302950927
	Thunderbolts: Dark Reign	2003-2010	Thunderbolts #76-81, 110-143, Thunderbolts: Desperate Measures; Thunderbolts: Breaking Point; Thunderbolts: International Incident; Thunderbolts: Reason in Madness; Pennance: Relentless; Deadpool (2008) #8-9; Secret Warriors (2009) #7-9; material from Civil War: Choosing Sides; Civil War: The Initiative	#76-81, #110-143	1,328	5 May 2026	Marko Djurdjevic cover: 978-1302968618
	Thunderbolts: Dark Reign	2003-2010	Thunderbolts #76-81, 110-143, Thunderbolts: Desperate Measures; Thunderbolts: Breaking Point; Thunderbolts: International Incident; Thunderbolts: Reason in Madness; Pennance: Relentless; Deadpool (2008) #8-9; Secret Warriors (2009) #7-9; material from Civil War: Choosing Sides; Civil War: The Initiative	#76-81, #110-143	1,328	5 May 2026	Mike Deodato Jr. DM cover: 978-1302968625
	Thunderbolts: Uncaged	2010-2013	Thunderbolts #144–174, 163.1; Enter the Heroic Age (2010) #1 (E-story); Dark Avengers #175–190; Avengers Academy #3-4	#144-190	1,160	5 Dec 2023	Greg Land cover: 978-1302952853
	Thunderbolts: Uncaged	2010-2013	Thunderbolts #144–174, 163.1; Enter the Heroic Age (2010) #1 (E-story); Dark Avengers #175–190; Avengers Academy #3-4	#144-190	1,160	5 Dec 2023	Mark Bagley DM cover: 978-1302952860
	Thunderbolts Red	2012-2014	Thunderbolts (vol. 2) #1–32, Annual (2013)		760	13 Feb 2024	Phil Noto cover: 978-1302953058
	Thunderbolts Red	2012-2014	Thunderbolts (vol. 2) #1–32, Annual (2013)		760	13 Feb 2024	Julian Totino Tedesco DM cover: 978-1302953065

=== The Tomb of Dracula ===
#	Title	Years covered	Material collected	Pages	Released	ISBN
1	The Tomb of Dracula Vol. 1	1972-1975	The Tomb of Dracula #1–31; Werewolf by Night #15; Giant-Size Chillers Featuring the Curse of Dracula #1; Giant-Size Dracula #2–4	784	26 Nov 2008	Neal Adams cover: 978-0785127789
1	The Tomb of Dracula Vol. 1	1972-1975	The Tomb of Dracula #1–31; Werewolf by Night #15; Giant-Size Chillers Featuring the Curse of Dracula #1; Giant-Size Dracula #2–4	784	26 Nov 2008	Gene Colan DM cover: 978-0785134305
1	The Tomb of Dracula Vol. 1	1972-1975	The Tomb of Dracula #1–31; Werewolf by Night #15; Giant-Size Chillers Featuring the Curse of Dracula #1; Giant-Size Dracula #2–4	784	3 Oct 2018	Neal Adams cover: 978-1302914158
1	The Tomb of Dracula Vol. 1	1972-1975	The Tomb of Dracula #1–31; Werewolf by Night #15; Giant-Size Chillers Featuring the Curse of Dracula #1; Giant-Size Dracula #2–4	784	23 Sep 2025	Neal Adams cover: 978-1302965037
1	The Tomb of Dracula Vol. 1	1972-1975	The Tomb of Dracula #1–31; Werewolf by Night #15; Giant-Size Chillers Featuring the Curse of Dracula #1; Giant-Size Dracula #2–4	784	23 Sep 2025	Gene Colan DM cover: 978-1302965044
2	The Tomb of Dracula Vol. 2	1975-1979	The Tomb of Dracula #32–70; Doctor Strange #14; Giant-Size Dracula #5	816	9 Dec 2009	Kalman Andrasofszky cover: 978-0785135760
2	The Tomb of Dracula Vol. 2	1975-1979	The Tomb of Dracula #32–70; Doctor Strange #14; Giant-Size Dracula #5	816	9 Dec 2009	Gene Colan DM cover: 978-0785135777
3	The Tomb of Dracula Vol. 3	1973-1980	The Tomb of Dracula (black-and-white magazine) #1–6; The Frankenstein Monster #7–9; Dracula Lives! #1–13	944	29 Dec 2010	Arthur Adams cover: 978-0785135784
3	The Tomb of Dracula Vol. 3	1973-1980	The Tomb of Dracula (black-and-white magazine) #1–6; The Frankenstein Monster #7–9; Dracula Lives! #1–13	944	29 Dec 2010	Gene Colan DM cover: 978-0785135791

=== Venom ===
#	Title	Years covered	Material collected	Pages	Released	ISBN
	Spider-Man vs. Venom Omnibus	1984-1994	Amazing Spider-Man #258, 300, 315–317, 332–333, 346–347, 361–363, 374, 378–380; Web of Spider-Man #1, 95–96, 101–103; Quasar #6; Marvel Graphic Novel No. 68 - Avengers: Death Trap - The Vault; Darkhawk #13–14; Spider-Man: The Trial of Venom; Ghost Rider/Blaze: Spirits of Vengeance #5–6; Spider-Man #35–37; Spectacular Spider-Man (vol. 2) #201–203; material from Amazing Spider-Man #373, 375, 388, Annual #25–26; Spectacular Spider-Man Annual #12; Web of Spider-Man Annual #8; Marvel Comics Presents #117–122; Spider-Man Unlimited (vol. 2) #1–2; Venom subplot pages	1,160	20 Sep 2018	Todd McFarlane cover: 978-1302913205
	Spider-Man vs. Venom Omnibus	1984-1994		1,160	7 Mar 2023	Todd McFarlane cover: 978-1302949808
	Spider-Man vs. Venom Omnibus	1984-1994		1,160	7 Mar 2023	Mark Bagley Carnage vs Venom DM cover: 978-1302949792
1	Venomnibus Vol. 1	1993-1995	Venom: Lethal Protector #1–6; Venom: Funeral Pyre #1–3; Daredevil (1964) #323; Iron Man (1968) #302; Darkhawk #35–37; Venom: The Madness #1–3; Venom: The Enemy Within #1–3; Incredible Hulk vs. Venom #1; Venom: The Mace #1–3; Nightwatch #5–6; Venom: Nights of Vengeance #1–4; Spider-Man: The Arachnis Project #6; Web of Spider-Man (1985) #118–119; Spider-Man (1990) #52–53; Venom: Separation Anxiety #1–4; Venom: Carnage Unleashed #1–4; material from Silver Sable and the Wild Pack #18–19; Venom subplot pages	1,096	3 Jul 2018	Mark Bagley cover: 978-1302912444
1	Venomnibus Vol. 1	1993-1995		1,096	5 May 2021	Mark Bagley cover: 978-1302929503
1	Venomnibus Vol. 1	1993-1995		1,096	5 May 2021	Andrew Wildman DM cover: 978-1302929510
2	Venomnibus Vol. 2	1995-1998	Venom: Sinner Takes All #1–5; Venom: Along Came a Spider #1–4; Venom: The Hunted #1–3; Venom: The Hunger #1–4, and more: Venom: Tooth and Claw #1–3; Venom on Trial #1–3; Venom: License to Kill #1–3; Venom: Seed of Darkness #−1; Venom: Sign of the Boss #1–2; Spider-Man: The Venom Agenda; Venom: The Finale #1–3; Uncanny Origins #7; material from Amazing Spider-Man Super Special, Spider-Man Super Special, Venom Super Special, Spectacular Spider-Man Super Special, Web of Spider-Man Super Special and Spider-Man Holiday Special 1995	1,176	19 Feb 2019	Kyle Hotz cover: 978-1302916534
3	Venomnibus Vol. 3	1999-2010	Peter Parker: Spider-Man (1999) #9–10, 12 (A-story), 16–17; Amazing Spider-Man (1999) #12 (A-story), 19; Spectacular Spider-Man (2003) #1–5; Nova (1999) #7; Venom (2003) #1–18; Venom vs. Carnage #1–4; Marvel Knights Spider-Man (2004) #7–8, 11; Sensational Spider-Man (2006) #38–39; Spider-Man/Fantastic Four (2010) #2; material from Spider-Man Family (2007) #1–2	1,088	17 Nov 2020	Sam Kieth cover: 978-1302926328
3	Venomnibus Vol. 3	1999-2010	Peter Parker: Spider-Man (1999) #9–10, 12 (A-story), 16–17; Amazing Spider-Man (1999) #12 (A-story), 19; Spectacular Spider-Man (2003) #1–5; Nova (1999) #7; Venom (2003) #1–18; Venom vs. Carnage #1–4; Marvel Knights Spider-Man (2004) #7–8, 11; Sensational Spider-Man (2006) #38–39; Spider-Man/Fantastic Four (2010) #2; material from Spider-Man Family (2007) #1–2	1,088	17 Nov 2020	Mike Deodato Tongue DM cover: 978-1302926335
	Agent Venomnibus	2011-2017	Amazing Spider-Man #654 (B-story), 654.1; Venom (2011) #1-42, 13.1-13.4, 27.1; Venom Space Knight #1-13; Minimum Carnage Alpha; Minimum Carnage Omega; Scarlet Spider (2012) #10-11	1,464	15 Jul 2025	Tony Moore cover: 978-1302966270
	Agent Venomnibus	2011-2017	Amazing Spider-Man #654 (B-story), 654.1; Venom (2011) #1-42, 13.1-13.4, 27.1; Venom Space Knight #1-13; Minimum Carnage Alpha; Minimum Carnage Omega; Scarlet Spider (2012) #10-11	1,464	15 Jul 2025	Mike Deodato Jr. DM cover: 978-1302966287
	Venomnibus by Cates & Stegman	2018-2021	Venom (2018) #1–35, Annual (2018) #1; Web of Venom: Ve'Nam; Web of Venom: Carnage Born; Web of Venom: Wraith; Absolute Carnage #1–5; King in Black #1–5; material from FCBD 2019 (Spider-Man/Venom), FCBD 2020 (Spider-Man/Venom), Incoming! #1, Carnage Black, White & Blood #2	1,352	13 Dec 2022	Ryan Stegman King in Black cover: 978-1302946418
	Venomnibus by Cates & Stegman	2018-2021	Venom (2018) #1–35, Annual (2018) #1; Web of Venom: Ve'Nam; Web of Venom: Carnage Born; Web of Venom: Wraith; Absolute Carnage #1–5; King in Black #1–5; material from FCBD 2019 (Spider-Man/Venom), FCBD 2020 (Spider-Man/Venom), Incoming! #1, Carnage Black, White & Blood #2	1,352	13 Dec 2022	Ryan Stegman Rex DM cover: 978-1302946425
Jump to: King in Black
Jump to: Venom War

=== Werewolf by Night ===
#	Title	Years covered	Material collected	Pages	Released	ISBN
	Werewolf By Night	1972-1977	Marvel Spotlight (1971) #2–4, Werewolf by Night (1972) #1–43, Marvel Team-Up (1972) #12, The Tomb of Dracula (1972) #18, Giant-Size Creatures #1, Giant-Size Werewolf #2–5, Marvel Premiere #28, material from The Tomb of Dracula #17 and Monsters Unleashed #6–7	1,176	6 Oct 2015	Mike Ploog cover: 978-0785199045
	Werewolf By Night	1972-1977	Marvel Spotlight (1971) #2–4, Werewolf by Night (1972) #1–43, Marvel Team-Up (1972) #12, The Tomb of Dracula (1972) #18, Giant-Size Creatures #1, Giant-Size Werewolf #2–5, Marvel Premiere #28, material from The Tomb of Dracula #17 and Monsters Unleashed #6–7	1,176	6 Oct 2015	Art Adams DM cover: 978-0785199076

=== What If...? ===
#	Title	Years covered	Material collected	Legacy	Pages	Released	ISBN
1	What If...?: The Original Marvel Series Vol. 1	1977-1980	What If? (1977) #1–15, 17–22	#1–15, #17–22	776	31 Aug 2021	Ron Wilson Spider-Man cover: 978-1302931353
1	What If...?: The Original Marvel Series Vol. 1	1977-1980	What If? (1977) #1–15, 17–22	#1–15, #17–22	776	31 Aug 2021	Jack Kirby FF DM cover: 978-1302930561
1	What If...?: The Original Marvel Series Vol. 1	1977-1980	What If? (1977) #1–15, 17–22	#1–15, #17–22	776	31 Aug 2021	John Buscema Thor DM cover: 978-1302929947
What If...? legacy number #16 can be found in: Shang-Chi, Master of Kung Fu Vol. 3
2	What If...?: The Original Marvel Series Vol. 2	1980-1984	What If? (1977) #23–47	#23–47	1,024	22 Feb 2022	Bob Budiansky Wolverine v Hulk cover: 978-1302929930
2	What If...?: The Original Marvel Series Vol. 2	1980-1984	What If? (1977) #23–47	#23–47	1,024	22 Feb 2022	Bob Layton Watcher DM cover: 978-1302931353
2	What If...?: The Original Marvel Series Vol. 2	1980-1984	What If? (1977) #23–47	#23–47	1,024	22 Feb 2022	John Romita Jr. Galactus DM cover: 978-1302931346
1	What If...?: Into the Multiverse Vol. 1	1988-1992	What If? Special (1988); What If? (1989) #1–39; Quasar #30	#48–87	1,240	26 Sep 2023	Al Milgrom Iron Man cover: 978-1302946456
1	What If...?: Into the Multiverse Vol. 1	1988-1992	What If? Special (1988); What If? (1989) #1–39; Quasar #30	#48–87	1,240	26 Sep 2023	Rodney Ramos X-Men DM cover: 978-1302946463
2	What If...?: Into the Multiverse Vol. 2	1992-1995	What If? (1989) #40–75	#88–123	1,096	19 Nov 2024	Bryan Hitch Canada cover: 978-1302953881
2	What If...?: Into the Multiverse Vol. 2	1992-1995	What If? (1989) #40–75	#88–123	1,096	19 Nov 2024	Bryan Hitch Galactus DM cover: 978-1302953898
3	What If...?: Into the Multiverse Vol. 3	1995-1998	What If? (1989) #76–83, 85-114, -1	#124–131, #133–163	1,112	7 Apr 2026	Doug Braithwaite Scarlet Spider cover: 978-1302965990
3	What If...?: Into the Multiverse Vol. 3	1995-1998	What If? (1989) #76–83, 85-114, -1	#124–131, #133–163	1,112	7 Apr 2026	Mike Wieringo Storm/Phoenix DM cover: 978-1302966003
What If...? legacy number #132 hasn't been collected anywhere

=== Wolverine ===
#	Title	Years covered	Material collected	Legacy	Pages	Released	ISBN
1	Wolverine Vol. 1	1974-1989, 1991	Marvel Comics Presents #1–10, 72–84; Incredible Hulk #180–182, 340; Marvel Treasury Edition #26; Best of Marvel Comics; Wolverine (1982) #1–4; Uncanny X-Men #172–173; Kitty Pryde and Wolverine #1–6; Captain America Annual #8; Spider-Man vs. Wolverine #1; Marvel Age Annual #4; Wolverine #1–10; The Punisher War Journal #6–7	#1-10	1,064	1 Apr 2009	Frank Miller cover: 978-0785134770
1	Wolverine Vol. 1	1974-1989, 1991	Marvel Comics Presents #1–10, 72–84; Incredible Hulk #180–182, 340; Marvel Treasury Edition #26; Best of Marvel Comics; Wolverine (1982) #1–4; Uncanny X-Men #172–173; Kitty Pryde and Wolverine #1–6; Captain America Annual #8; Spider-Man vs. Wolverine #1; Marvel Age Annual #4; Wolverine #1–10; The Punisher War Journal #6–7	#1-10	1,064	1 Apr 2009	Steve McNiven DM cover: 978-0785136651
1	Wolverine Vol. 1	1974-1989, 1991	Marvel Comics Presents #1–10, 72–84; Incredible Hulk #180–182, 340; Marvel Treasury Edition #26; Best of Marvel Comics; Wolverine (1982) #1–4; Uncanny X-Men #172–173; Kitty Pryde and Wolverine #1–6; Captain America Annual #8; Spider-Man vs. Wolverine #1; Marvel Age Annual #4; Wolverine #1–10; The Punisher War Journal #6–7	#1-10	1,064	7 Apr 2020	Frank Miller cover: 978-1302922672
1	Wolverine Vol. 1	1974-1989, 1991	Marvel Comics Presents #1–10, 72–84; Incredible Hulk #180–182, 340; Marvel Treasury Edition #26; Best of Marvel Comics; Wolverine (1982) #1–4; Uncanny X-Men #172–173; Kitty Pryde and Wolverine #1–6; Captain America Annual #8; Spider-Man vs. Wolverine #1; Marvel Age Annual #4; Wolverine #1–10; The Punisher War Journal #6–7	#1-10	1,064	7 Apr 2020	Steve McNiven DM cover: 978-1302923839
2	Wolverine Vol. 2	1989-1990	Wolverine #11–30; Havok & Wolverine: Meltdown #1–4; Wolverine/Nick Fury: The Scorpio Connection; Wolverine: The Jungle Adventure; Wolverine: Bloodlust; material from Marvel Comics Presents #38–71	#11-30	1,248	4 Aug 2021	Jim Lee cover: 978-1302929954
2	Wolverine Vol. 2	1989-1990	Wolverine #11–30; Havok & Wolverine: Meltdown #1–4; Wolverine/Nick Fury: The Scorpio Connection; Wolverine: The Jungle Adventure; Wolverine: Bloodlust; material from Marvel Comics Presents #38–71	#11-30	1,248	4 Aug 2021	Barry Windsor-Smith DM cover: 978-1302930523
2	Wolverine Vol. 2	1989-1990	Wolverine #11–30; Havok & Wolverine: Meltdown #1–4; Wolverine/Nick Fury: The Scorpio Connection; Wolverine: The Jungle Adventure; Wolverine: Bloodlust; material from Marvel Comics Presents #38–71	#11-30	1,248	4 Aug 2021	John Byrne DM cover: 978-1302929961
2	Wolverine Vol. 2	1989-1990	Wolverine #11–30; Havok & Wolverine: Meltdown #1–4; Wolverine/Nick Fury: The Scorpio Connection; Wolverine: The Jungle Adventure; Wolverine: Bloodlust; material from Marvel Comics Presents #38–71	#11-30	1,248	8 Nov 2022	Jim Lee cover: 978-1302945138
2	Wolverine Vol. 2	1989-1990	Wolverine #11–30; Havok & Wolverine: Meltdown #1–4; Wolverine/Nick Fury: The Scorpio Connection; Wolverine: The Jungle Adventure; Wolverine: Bloodlust; material from Marvel Comics Presents #38–71	#11-30	1,248	8 Nov 2022	Barry Windsor-Smith DM cover: 978-1302945145
2	Wolverine Vol. 2	1989-1990	Wolverine #11–30; Havok & Wolverine: Meltdown #1–4; Wolverine/Nick Fury: The Scorpio Connection; Wolverine: The Jungle Adventure; Wolverine: Bloodlust; material from Marvel Comics Presents #38–71	#11-30	1,248	8 Nov 2022	John Byrne DM cover: 978-1302945121
3	Wolverine Vol. 3	1990-1992	Wolverine #31–59; Wolverine: Bloody Choices; Wolverine: Rahne of Terra; Ghost Rider/Wolverine/Punisher: Hearts of Darkness; X-Men (1991) #4–7; material from Marvel Fanfare #54–55 and Marvel Comics Presents #85–108	#31-59	1,264	17 Jan 2023	Marc Silvestri cover: 978-1302946517
3	Wolverine Vol. 3	1990-1992	Wolverine #31–59; Wolverine: Bloody Choices; Wolverine: Rahne of Terra; Ghost Rider/Wolverine/Punisher: Hearts of Darkness; X-Men (1991) #4–7; material from Marvel Fanfare #54–55 and Marvel Comics Presents #85–108	#31-59	1,264	17 Jan 2023	Jim Lee DM cover: 978-1302946524
3	Wolverine Vol. 3	1990-1992	Wolverine #31–59; Wolverine: Bloody Choices; Wolverine: Rahne of Terra; Ghost Rider/Wolverine/Punisher: Hearts of Darkness; X-Men (1991) #4–7; material from Marvel Fanfare #54–55 and Marvel Comics Presents #85–108	#31-59	1,264	17 Jan 2023	Michael Avon Oeming DM cover: 978-1302948399
4	Wolverine Vol. 4	1992-1993	Wolverine #60–75; Wolverine: Inner Fury; Wolverine: Killing; Wolverine: Global Jeopardy; Wolverine and the Punisher: Damaging Evidence #1–3; Sabretooth #1–4; Spider-Man/Punisher/Sabretooth: Designer Genes; X-Men (1991) #25; material from Marvel Comics Presents #109–142 and Marvel Holiday Special #2	#60-75	1,176	12 Sep 2023	Adam Kubert cover: 978-1302953997
4	Wolverine Vol. 4	1992-1993	Wolverine #60–75; Wolverine: Inner Fury; Wolverine: Killing; Wolverine: Global Jeopardy; Wolverine and the Punisher: Damaging Evidence #1–3; Sabretooth #1–4; Spider-Man/Punisher/Sabretooth: Designer Genes; X-Men (1991) #25; material from Marvel Comics Presents #109–142 and Marvel Holiday Special #2	#60-75	1,176	12 Sep 2023	Andy Kubert Magneto DM cover: 978-1302954000
4	Wolverine Vol. 4	1992-1993	Wolverine #60–75; Wolverine: Inner Fury; Wolverine: Killing; Wolverine: Global Jeopardy; Wolverine and the Punisher: Damaging Evidence #1–3; Sabretooth #1–4; Spider-Man/Punisher/Sabretooth: Designer Genes; X-Men (1991) #25; material from Marvel Comics Presents #109–142 and Marvel Holiday Special #2	#60-75	1,176	12 Sep 2023	Mark Texeira Sabretooth DM cover: 978-1302954017
5	Wolverine Vol. 5	1993-1996	Wolverine #76–101, Annual '95; Marvel Comics Presents #150–151, 152–155 (A-stories); Cable #16; Wolverine: Evilution #1; Wolverine & Nick Fury: Scorpio Rising #1 Ghost Rider/Wolverine/Punisher: The Dark Design #1; Wolverine: Knight of Terra #1; Wolverine/Gambit: Victims #1–4; Uncanny X-Men #332; Logan: Path of the Warlord #1	#76-101	1,296	14 May 2024	Adam Kubert cover: 978-1302958060
5	Wolverine Vol. 5	1993-1996	Wolverine #76–101, Annual '95; Marvel Comics Presents #150–151, 152–155 (A-stories); Cable #16; Wolverine: Evilution #1; Wolverine & Nick Fury: Scorpio Rising #1 Ghost Rider/Wolverine/Punisher: The Dark Design #1; Wolverine: Knight of Terra #1; Wolverine/Gambit: Victims #1–4; Uncanny X-Men #332; Logan: Path of the Warlord #1	#76-101	1,296	14 May 2024	Ian Churchill Cyber DM cover: 978-1302958077
5	Wolverine Vol. 5	1993-1996	Wolverine #76–101, Annual '95; Marvel Comics Presents #150–151, 152–155 (A-stories); Cable #16; Wolverine: Evilution #1; Wolverine & Nick Fury: Scorpio Rising #1 Ghost Rider/Wolverine/Punisher: The Dark Design #1; Wolverine: Knight of Terra #1; Wolverine/Gambit: Victims #1–4; Uncanny X-Men #332; Logan: Path of the Warlord #1	#76-101	1,296	14 May 2024	Tim Sale Gambit DM cover: 978-1302958107
6	Wolverine Vol. 6	1996-1997, 2000	Wolverine #102–118, -1, 1/2, 102.5; Annual 1996-1997; Logan: Shadow Society; Venom: Tooth and Claw #1–3; Maverick; Wolverine: Doombringer; Kitty Pryde: Agent of S.H.I.E.L.D. #1–3; Before the Fantastic Four: Ben Grimm and Logan #1–3; Wolverine: Days of Future Past #1–3; Wolverine Encyclopedia #1–2; material from Marvel: Shadows and Light	#102-118	1,152	27 May 2025	Leinil Francis Yu cover: 978-1302964313
6	Wolverine Vol. 6	1996-1997, 2000	Wolverine #102–118, -1, 1/2, 102.5; Annual 1996-1997; Logan: Shadow Society; Venom: Tooth and Claw #1–3; Maverick; Wolverine: Doombringer; Kitty Pryde: Agent of S.H.I.E.L.D. #1–3; Before the Fantastic Four: Ben Grimm and Logan #1–3; Wolverine: Days of Future Past #1–3; Wolverine Encyclopedia #1–2; material from Marvel: Shadows and Light	#102-118	1,152	27 May 2025	David Winn DM cover: 978-1302964320
	Wolverine: Not Dead Yet	1998-2000	Wolverine #119-158, Annual 1999; Wolverine: Black Rio; Wolverine/Cable; Wolverine/Punisher: Revelation #1-4; Iron Fist/Wolverine #1-4; Hulk #8	#119-158	1,392	2 Jun 2026	Leinil Francis Yu cover: 978-1302968632
	Wolverine: Not Dead Yet	1998-2000	Wolverine #119-158, Annual 1999; Wolverine: Black Rio; Wolverine/Cable; Wolverine/Punisher: Revelation #1-4; Iron Fist/Wolverine #1-4; Hulk #8	#119-158	1,392	2 Jun 2026	Ian Churchill DM cover: 978-1302968649
	Weapon X: The Return	2001-2004, 2014	Wolverine #162–166, 173–174, 176; Deadpool (1997) #57–60; Weapon X (2002) #1–28, 1/2; Weapon X: The Draft - Sauron, Wild Child, Kane, Marrow and Agent Zero; Weapon X: Days of Future Now #1–5; material from Wolverine #175, Deadpool (2013) #27	#162-176	1,280	15 May 2018	Bart Sears cover: 978-1302911829
	Wolverine by Mark Millar	2004-2005, 2009	Wolverine (2003) #20–32, 66–72; Wolverine: Giant-Size Old Man Logan	#209-221, #255-261	576	2 Jul 2013	Joe Quesada cover: 978-0785167969
1	Wolverine by Jason Aaron Vol. 1	2007-2010, 2002	Wolverine (2003) #56, 62–65; Wolverine: Manifest Destiny #1–4; Wolverine: Weapon X #1–16; Dark Reign: The List – Wolverine; material from Wolverine (2003) #73–74, Dark X-Men: The Beginning #3, Wolverine (1988) #175	#245, #251-254, #262-279	688	1 Jul 2011	David Finch cover: 978-0785156390
1	Wolverine by Jason Aaron Vol. 1	2007-2010, 2002	Wolverine (2003) #56, 62–65; Wolverine: Manifest Destiny #1–4; Wolverine: Weapon X #1–16; Dark Reign: The List – Wolverine; material from Wolverine (2003) #73–74, Dark X-Men: The Beginning #3, Wolverine (1988) #175	#245, #251-254, #262-279	688	15 Apr 2025	David Finch cover: 978-1302961367
1	Wolverine by Jason Aaron Vol. 1	2007-2010, 2002	Wolverine (2003) #56, 62–65; Wolverine: Manifest Destiny #1–4; Wolverine: Weapon X #1–16; Dark Reign: The List – Wolverine; material from Wolverine (2003) #73–74, Dark X-Men: The Beginning #3, Wolverine (1988) #175	#245, #251-254, #262-279	688	15 Apr 2025	Adam Kubert Motorbike DM cover: 978-1302961374
	Daken: Dark Wolverine	2009-2012	Dark Wolverine #75-90, Daken: Dark Wolverine #1-23, 9.1; Dark Reign: The List - Punisher; Wolverine Origins #11-15, #47-48; Franken-Castle #19-20; X-23 (2010B) #7-9; What If...? Wolverine Father; Dark Wolverine Saga; Daken Saga; material from Wolverine Origins #10, Wolverine: The Road to Hell		1,328	28 Apr 2026	Leinil Francis Yu cover: 978-1302966621
	Daken: Dark Wolverine	2009-2012	Dark Wolverine #75-90, Daken: Dark Wolverine #1-23, 9.1; Dark Reign: The List - Punisher; Wolverine Origins #11-15, #47-48; Franken-Castle #19-20; X-23 (2010B) #7-9; What If...? Wolverine Father; Dark Wolverine Saga; Daken Saga; material from Wolverine Origins #10, Wolverine: The Road to Hell		1,328	28 Apr 2026	Giuseppe Camuncoli DM cover: 978-1302966614
2	Wolverine Goes to Hell	2010-2012	Astonishing Spider-Man and Wolverine #1–6; Wolverine (2010) #1–20, 5.1; Wolverine 300–304; X-Men: Schism #1–5; material from Wolverine: Road to Hell	#280-304	984	15 May 2018	Jae Lee cover: 978-1302911591
2	Wolverine Goes to Hell	2010-2012	Astonishing Spider-Man and Wolverine #1–6; Wolverine (2010) #1–20, 5.1; Wolverine 300–304; X-Men: Schism #1–5; material from Wolverine: Road to Hell	#280-304	984	22 Jul 2025	Jae Lee cover: 978-1302961381
2	Wolverine Goes to Hell	2010-2012	Astonishing Spider-Man and Wolverine #1–6; Wolverine (2010) #1–20, 5.1; Wolverine 300–304; X-Men: Schism #1–5; material from Wolverine: Road to Hell	#280-304	984	22 Jul 2025	Arthur Adams DM cover: 978-1302961398
3	Wolverine and the X-Men by Jason Aaron	2011-2014	Wolverine and the X-Men #1–35, 38–42, Annual #1		928	17 Jun 2014	978-0785190240
3	Wolverine and the X-Men by Jason Aaron	2011-2014	Wolverine and the X-Men #1–35, 38–42, Annual #1		928	2 Feb 2022	Chris Bachalo cover: 978-1302932442
3	Wolverine and the X-Men by Jason Aaron	2011-2014	Wolverine and the X-Men #1–35, 38–42, Annual #1		928	2 Feb 2022	Stuart Immonen DM cover: 978-1302932459
	Death of Wolverine	2013-2014	Wolverine (2013) #1–13; Wolverine (2014) #1–12, Annual #1; Marvel 75th Anniversary Celebration (Wolverine story); Death of Wolverine #1–4; Death of Wolverine: The Weapon X Program #1–5; Death of Wolverine: The Logan Legacy #1–7; Death of Wolverine: Deadpool & Captain America #1; Death of Wolverine: Life After Logan #1; Nightcrawler (2014) #7; Wolverine and the X-Men (2014) #10–11; Storm (2014) #4–5	#318-342	1,232	17 Dec 2024	Alex Ross cover: 978-1302959876
	Death of Wolverine	2013-2014	Wolverine (2013) #1–13; Wolverine (2014) #1–12, Annual #1; Marvel 75th Anniversary Celebration (Wolverine story); Death of Wolverine #1–4; Death of Wolverine: The Weapon X Program #1–5; Death of Wolverine: The Logan Legacy #1–7; Death of Wolverine: Deadpool & Captain America #1; Death of Wolverine: Life After Logan #1; Nightcrawler (2014) #7; Wolverine and the X-Men (2014) #10–11; Storm (2014) #4–5	#318-342	1,232	17 Dec 2024	Joe Quesada DM cover: 978-1302959883
	Wolverine: Return of Wolverine	2015-2019	Wolverines #1-20; Hunt For Wolverine; Hunt For Wolverine: Weapon Lost #1-4; Hunt For Wolverine: The Adamantium Agenda #1-4; Hunt For Wolverine: The Claws of a Killer #1-4; Hunt For Wolverine: Mystery in Mandripoor #1-4; Hunt For Wolverine: Dead Ends; Return of Wolverine #1-5; Wolverine: Infinity Watch #1-5; material from Marvel Legacy (2017); The Amazing Spider-Man #794; Captain America #697; Mighty Thor #703; Avengers #680; Black Panther #170; Marvel 2-In-One #3; Incredible Hulk #714; Invincible Iron Man #598; X-Men: Red #2; X-Men: Gold (2017) #30		1,232	25 Nov 2025	John Cassaday cover: 978-1302965877
	Wolverine: Return of Wolverine	2015-2019			1,232	25 Nov 2025	Nick Bradshaw DM cover: 978-1302965884
	Wolverine: Return of Wolverine	2015-2019			1,232	25 Nov 2025	R.B. Silva DM cover: 978-1302967383
	Wolverine: Sabretooth War	2022-2024	Sabretooth (2022) #1–5; Sabretooth & the Exiles (2022) #1–5; Wolverine (2020) #41–50	#383-392	592	3 Jun 2025	Leinil Francis Yu cover: 978-1302961404
	Wolverine: Sabretooth War	2022-2024	Sabretooth (2022) #1–5; Sabretooth & the Exiles (2022) #1–5; Wolverine (2020) #41–50	#383-392	592	3 Jun 2025	Greg Capullo DM cover: 978-1302961411
Other Wolverine series
1	Wolverine: Old Man Logan Vol. 1	2008-2009, 2015-2017	Wolverine (2003) #66–72; Wolverine: Old Man Logan Giant-Size, Old Man Logan (2015) #1-5, Old Man Logan (2016) #1-24	#255-261	944	15 Dec 2026	Andrea Sorrentino cover: 978-1302970147
1	Wolverine: Old Man Logan Vol. 1	2008-2009, 2015-2017	Wolverine (2003) #66–72; Wolverine: Old Man Logan Giant-Size, Old Man Logan (2015) #1-5, Old Man Logan (2016) #1-24	#255-261	944	15 Dec 2026	Rahzzah DM cover: TBC

=== Wonder Man ===
#	Title	Years covered	Material collected	Pages	Released	ISBN
	Wonder Man: The Early Years	1964-2008	Avengers #9, 52, 131–132, 151–153, 157–160, 164–166, 181, 192–194, 197, 203, 207–208, 211, 239; Giant-Size Avengers #3; Marvel Team-Up #78, 136; Marvel Premiere #55; Marvel Two-in-One #78; Vision and the Scarlet Witch (1982) #3; Vision and the Scarlet Witch (1985) #2; West Coast Avengers (1984) #2; West Coast Avengers (1985) #1–2 and #25; Avengers West Coast #66–68; Wonder Man (1986) #1; material from Avengers #201, Annual #6, Solo Avengers #13, Marvel Comics Presents #38–45, Marvel Super-Heroes #4; Avengers West Coast (1989) #65 and Avengers Classic (2007) #9	1,064	12 Dec 2023	Arthur Adams cover: 978-1302953522
	Wonder Man: The Early Years	1964-2008		1,064	12 Dec 2023	Jack Kirby DM cover: 978-1302953539

=== X-23 (Laura Kinney) ===
#	Title	Years covered	Material collected	Pages	Released	ISBN
1	X-23 Vol. 1	2005-2012	X-23 (2005) #1–6, X-23: Target X #1–6, X-23 (2010A) #1, X-23 (2010B) #1–21, Captain Universe/X-23 #1, Daken: Dark Wolverine #8–9; material from X-Men: To Serve and Protect #2, Wolverine: The Road to Hell #1, All-New Wolverine Saga	928	27 Jun 2023	Mike Choi cover: 978-1302951603
1	X-23 Vol. 1	2005-2012	X-23 (2005) #1–6, X-23: Target X #1–6, X-23 (2010A) #1, X-23 (2010B) #1–21, Captain Universe/X-23 #1, Daken: Dark Wolverine #8–9; material from X-Men: To Serve and Protect #2, Wolverine: The Road to Hell #1, All-New Wolverine Saga	928	27 Jun 2023	Leinil Francis Yu DM cover: 978-1302951610
	All-New Wolverine by Tom Taylor	2015-2018	All-New Wolverine #1–35, Annual #1; Generations: Wolverine and All-New Wolverine	862	21 Apr 2021	Bengal cover: 978-1302926441
	All-New Wolverine by Tom Taylor	2015-2018	All-New Wolverine #1–35, Annual #1; Generations: Wolverine and All-New Wolverine	862	21 Apr 2021	Adam Kubert DM cover: 978-1302926458

=== X-Factor ===
#	Title	Years covered	Material collected	Legacy	Pages	Released	ISBN
1	X-Factor: The Original X-Men Vol. 1	1986-1988	Avengers #263; Fantastic Four #286, 312; X-Factor #1–26, Annual #1–2; Iron Man Annual #8; Amazing Spider-Man #282; Thor #373–374, 377–378; Power Pack #27, 35; Mephisto vs. #2; Incredible Hulk (vol. 2) #336–337; Classic X-Men #8, #43; Secret Wars II #5; material from Marvel Fanfare #40	#1-26	1,224	16 Jul 2024	Walt Simonson Classic Costumes cover: 978-1302956974
1	X-Factor: The Original X-Men Vol. 1	1986-1988	Avengers #263; Fantastic Four #286, 312; X-Factor #1–26, Annual #1–2; Iron Man Annual #8; Amazing Spider-Man #282; Thor #373–374, 377–378; Power Pack #27, 35; Mephisto vs. #2; Incredible Hulk (vol. 2) #336–337; Classic X-Men #8, #43; Secret Wars II #5; material from Marvel Fanfare #40	#1-26	1,224	16 Jul 2024	Walt Simonson Modern Costumes DM cover: 978-1302956981
Jump to: Mutant Massacre (#1-17)
Jump to: Fall of the Mutants (#18-26)
2	X-Factor: The Original X-Men Vol. 2	1988-1990	X-Factor #27–50, Annual #3-4; X-Terminators #1-4; Uncanny X-Men #240-243; New Mutants #76; Fantastic Four #342; material from New Mutants Annual #5; Marvel Comics Presents #15, 17-24	#27-50	1,136	27 Jan 2026	Walt Simonson Inferno cover: 978-1302966096
2	X-Factor: The Original X-Men Vol. 2	1988-1990	X-Factor #27–50, Annual #3-4; X-Terminators #1-4; Uncanny X-Men #240-243; New Mutants #76; Fantastic Four #342; material from New Mutants Annual #5; Marvel Comics Presents #15, 17-24	#27-50	1,136	27 Jan 2026	Walt Simonson Evolutionary War DM cover: 978-1302966102
3	X-Factor: The Original X-Men Vol. 3	1990-1991	X-Factor #51-70; X-Factor Annual #5-6; X-Factor: Prisoner of Love #1; Marvel Fanfare #50; Uncanny X-Men #270-273, #278-280; New Mutants #95-97; material from Fantastic Four Annual #23; New Mutants Annual #6; X-Men Annual #14; X-Force Annual #1; Marvel Comics Presents #74, #85-92	#51-70	1,240	10 Nov 2026	Whilce Portacio cover: 978-1302970208
3	X-Factor: The Original X-Men Vol. 3	1990-1991	X-Factor #51-70; X-Factor Annual #5-6; X-Factor: Prisoner of Love #1; Marvel Fanfare #50; Uncanny X-Men #270-273, #278-280; New Mutants #95-97; material from Fantastic Four Annual #23; New Mutants Annual #6; X-Men Annual #14; X-Force Annual #1; Marvel Comics Presents #74, #85-92	#51-70	1,240	10 Nov 2026	Mike Mignola DM cover: 978-1302970192
Jump to: X-Tinction Agenda (#60-62)
1	X-Factor by Peter David Vol. 1	1990-1993	X-Factor #55, 70–92, Annual #7–8; Incredible Hulk (vol. 2) #390–392; material from X-Factor Annual #5–6; New Mutants Annual #6	#70-92	848	31 Aug 2021	Larry Stroman cover: 978-1302930653
1	X-Factor by Peter David Vol. 1	1990-1993	X-Factor #55, 70–92, Annual #7–8; Incredible Hulk (vol. 2) #390–392; material from X-Factor Annual #5–6; New Mutants Annual #6	#70-92	848	31 Aug 2021	Joe Quesada DM cover: 978-1302930660
1	X-Factor by Peter David Vol. 1	1990-1993	X-Factor #55, 70–92, Annual #7–8; Incredible Hulk (vol. 2) #390–392; material from X-Factor Annual #5–6; New Mutants Annual #6	#70-92	848	29 Jul 2025	Larry Stroman cover: 978-1302963705
1	X-Factor by Peter David Vol. 1	1990-1993	X-Factor #55, 70–92, Annual #7–8; Incredible Hulk (vol. 2) #390–392; material from X-Factor Annual #5–6; New Mutants Annual #6	#70-92	848	29 Jul 2025	Joe Quesada DM cover: 978-1302963712
2	X-Factor by Peter David Vol. 2	2004-2009	Madrox (2004) #1–5, X-Factor (vol. 3) #1–20, 21–24 (A-stories), 25–39; X-Factor: The Quick and the Dead; X-Factor Special: Layla Miller; She-Hulk (2005) #31	#150-188	1,128	29 Nov 2022	Ryan Sook cover: 978-1302945220
2	X-Factor by Peter David Vol. 2	2004-2009	Madrox (2004) #1–5, X-Factor (vol. 3) #1–20, 21–24 (A-stories), 25–39; X-Factor: The Quick and the Dead; X-Factor Special: Layla Miller; She-Hulk (2005) #31	#150-188	1,128	29 Nov 2022	Pablo Raimondi DM cover: 978-1302945237
3	X-Factor by Peter David Vol. 3	2009-2012	X-Factor (vol. 3) #40–50, 200–232, 224.1; Nation X: X-Factor #1	#189-232	1,160	12 Mar 2024	David Yardin cover: 978-1302953300
3	X-Factor by Peter David Vol. 3	2009-2012	X-Factor (vol. 3) #40–50, 200–232, 224.1; Nation X: X-Factor #1	#189-232	1,160	12 Mar 2024	Nick Bradshaw DM cover: 978-1302953294
4	X-Factor by Peter David Vol. 4	2012-2015, 2021	X-Factor #233–262; All-New X-Factor #1–20; X-Men Legends (2021) #5–6	#233-282	1,152	15 Jul 2025	David Yardin cover: 978-1302964252
4	X-Factor by Peter David Vol. 4	2012-2015, 2021	X-Factor #233–262; All-New X-Factor #1–20; X-Men Legends (2021) #5–6	#233-282	1,152	15 Jul 2025	Todd Nauck DM cover: 978-1302964269

=== X-Force ===
The first appearance of X-Force is in New Mutants issue 98. That series ended in 1991 with issue #100 and relaunched as X-Force #1.

#	Title	Years covered	Material collected	Legacy	Pages	Released	ISBN
Jump to: New Mutants
1	X-Force Vol. 1	1991-1992	New Mutants #98–100, Annual #7; material from New Warriors Annual #1; X-Men Annual #15; X-Factor Annual #6; X-Force #1–15, material from Annual #1; Spider-Man #16; Cable: Blood & Metal #1–2	#1-15	840	26 Feb 2013	Rob Liefeld Black Bands cover: 978-0785165958
1	X-Force Vol. 1	1991-1992	New Mutants #98–100, Annual #7; material from New Warriors Annual #1; X-Men Annual #15; X-Factor Annual #6; X-Force #1–15, material from Annual #1; Spider-Man #16; Cable: Blood & Metal #1–2	#1-15	840	26 Feb 2013	Rob Liefeld DM cover: 978-0785166184
1	X-Force Vol. 1	1991-1992	New Mutants #98–100, Annual #7; material from New Warriors Annual #1; X-Men Annual #15; X-Factor Annual #6; X-Force #1–15, material from Annual #1; Spider-Man #16; Cable: Blood & Metal #1–2	#1-15	848	17 Dec 2024	Rob Liefeld Black Bands cover: 978-1302959128
1	X-Force Vol. 1	1991-1992	New Mutants #98–100, Annual #7; material from New Warriors Annual #1; X-Men Annual #15; X-Factor Annual #6; X-Force #1–15, material from Annual #1; Spider-Man #16; Cable: Blood & Metal #1–2	#1-15	848	17 Dec 2024	Rob Liefeld DM cover: 978-1302959135
X-Force legacy numbers #16-18 are part of the X-Cutioner's Song event and can be found in: X-Men: Blue & Gold - Mutant Genesis
	Deadpool & X-Force	1992-1994	X-Force #19–31, Annual #2; Cable #1–8; Deadpool: The Circle Chase #1–4; Deadpool (1994) #1–4; New Warriors #31; Nomad (1992) #20	#19-31	872	1 Nov 2017	Greg Capullo, Ian Churchill & Ken Lashley cover: 978-1302908300
	Deadpool & X-Force	1992-1994	X-Force #19–31, Annual #2; Cable #1–8; Deadpool: The Circle Chase #1–4; Deadpool (1994) #1–4; New Warriors #31; Nomad (1992) #20	#19-31	872	16 Dec 2025	Greg Capullo, Ian Churchill & Ken Lashley cover: 978-1302961176
	Deadpool & X-Force	1992-1994	X-Force #19–31, Annual #2; Cable #1–8; Deadpool: The Circle Chase #1–4; Deadpool (1994) #1–4; New Warriors #31; Nomad (1992) #20	#19-31	872	16 Dec 2025	Greg Capullo DM cover: 978-1302961183
	Cable and X-Force	1994-1995	X-Force (1991) #32–43, Annual #3; Cable #9–20; New Warriors #45–46; X-Factor #106; Excalibur #82; Wolverine (1988) #85	#32-43	864	3 Jul 2019	Steve Skroce cover: 978-1302917777
	Uncanny X-Force by Rick Remender	2010-2012	Uncanny X-Force #1–35, 5.1, 19.1; material from Wolverine: Road to Hell #1	#164-198	928	5 Mar 2014	Esad Ribić cover: 978-0785185710
	Uncanny X-Force by Rick Remender	2010-2012	Uncanny X-Force #1–35, 5.1, 19.1; material from Wolverine: Road to Hell #1	#164-198	928	17 Mar 2020	Esad Ribić cover: 978-1302922665
	Uncanny X-Force by Rick Remender	2010-2012	Uncanny X-Force #1–35, 5.1, 19.1; material from Wolverine: Road to Hell #1	#164-198	928	9 Jul 2024	Esad Ribić cover: 978-1302957735
	Uncanny X-Force by Rick Remender	2010-2012	Uncanny X-Force #1–35, 5.1, 19.1; material from Wolverine: Road to Hell #1	#164-198	928	9 Jul 2024	Mark Brooks DM cover: 978-1302957742

=== X-Men ===
#	Title	Years covered	Material collected	Legacy	Pages	Released	ISBN
1	The X-Men Vol. 1	1963-1967	The X-Men #1–31	#1–31	768	18 Mar 2009	Alan Davis cover: 978-0785129585
1	The X-Men Vol. 1	1963-1967	The X-Men #1–31	#1–31	768	18 Mar 2009	Jack Kirby DM cover: 978-0785131939
1	The X-Men Vol. 1	1963-1967	The X-Men #1–31	#1–31	768	23 Feb 2022	Alan Davis cover: 978-1302932893
1	The X-Men Vol. 1	1963-1967	The X-Men #1–31	#1–31	768	23 Feb 2022	Jack Kirby DM cover: 978-1302932909
2	The X-Men Vol. 2	1967-1971	The X-Men #32–66; The Avengers #53; Ka-Zar #2–3; Marvel Tales #30; material from Not Brand Echh #4, 8	#32–66	912	27 Apr 2011	John Cassaday cover: 978-0785153078
2	The X-Men Vol. 2	1967-1971	The X-Men #32–66; The Avengers #53; Ka-Zar #2–3; Marvel Tales #30; material from Not Brand Echh #4, 8	#32–66	912	27 Apr 2011	George Tuska DM cover: 978-0785156543
2	The X-Men Vol. 2	1967-1971	The X-Men #32–66; The Avengers #53; Ka-Zar #2–3; Marvel Tales #30; material from Not Brand Echh #4, 8	#32–66	912	29 Mar 2022	John Cassaday cover: 978-1302932909
2	The X-Men Vol. 2	1967-1971	The X-Men #32–66; The Avengers #53; Ka-Zar #2–3; Marvel Tales #30; material from Not Brand Echh #4, 8	#32–66	912	29 Mar 2022	George Tuska DM cover: 978-1302933746
	X-Men Classic	1986-1991	Back-up stories and new pages from Classic X-Men #1–44; material from Marvel Fanfare (1982) #60; Director's Cut of Giant-Size X-Men #1, Uncanny X-Men #94		1,040	19 Dec 2017	Arthur Adams cover: 978-1302908119
	X-Men: The Hidden Years	1999-2001, 1962, 1970	X-Men: The Hidden Years #1–22; Fantastic Four #102–104; material from X-Men (1991) #94, Amazing Adult Fantasy #14		624	2 Jan 2024	John Byrne New Costumes cover: 978-1302950217
	X-Men: The Hidden Years	1999-2001, 1962, 1970	X-Men: The Hidden Years #1–22; Fantastic Four #102–104; material from X-Men (1991) #94, Amazing Adult Fantasy #14		624	2 Jan 2024	John Byrne Classic Costumes DM cover: 978-1302950224
X-Men legacy numbers #67-93 are exclusively reprints of previously released stories
1	The Uncanny X-Men Vol. 1	1975-1980	Giant-Size X-Men #1; Uncanny X-Men #94–131, Annual #3	#94–131	848	31 May 2006	Gil Kane cover: 978-0785121015
1	The Uncanny X-Men Vol. 1	1975-1980	Giant-Size X-Men #1; Uncanny X-Men #94–131, Annual #3	#94–131	848	14 Nov 2007	Gil Kane cover: 978-0785121013
1	The Uncanny X-Men Vol. 1	1975-1980	Giant-Size X-Men #1; Uncanny X-Men #94–131, Annual #3	#94–131	848	17 Sep 2013	Gil Kane cover: 978-0785185697
1	The Uncanny X-Men Vol. 1	1975-1980	Giant-Size X-Men #1; Uncanny X-Men #94–131, Annual #3	#94–131	848	4 May 2016	Gil Kane cover: 978-1302900830
1	The Uncanny X-Men Vol. 1	1975-1980	Giant-Size X-Men #1; Uncanny X-Men #94–131, Annual #3	#94–131	848	14 Jul 2020	Gil Kane cover: 978-1302924805
2	The Uncanny X-Men Vol. 2	1980-1982	Uncanny X-Men #132–153, Annual #4–5; Avengers Annual #10; Phoenix: The Untold Story (one-shot); material from Marvel Fanfare #1–4; Marvel Treasury Edition #26–27; Marvel Team-Up #100; Bizarre Adventures #27	#132–153	912	29 Apr 2014	Stuart Immonen cover: 978-0785185727
2	The Uncanny X-Men Vol. 2	1980-1982	Uncanny X-Men #132–153, Annual #4–5; Avengers Annual #10; Phoenix: The Untold Story (one-shot); material from Marvel Fanfare #1–4; Marvel Treasury Edition #26–27; Marvel Team-Up #100; Bizarre Adventures #27	#132–153	912	29 Apr 2014	John Byrne DM cover: 978-0785185734
2	The Uncanny X-Men Vol. 2	1980-1982	Uncanny X-Men #132–153, Annual #4–5; Avengers Annual #10; Phoenix: The Untold Story (one-shot); material from Marvel Fanfare #1–4; Marvel Treasury Edition #26–27; Marvel Team-Up #100; Bizarre Adventures #27	#132–153	912	5 Oct 2016	John Byrne cover: 978-1302901660
2	The Uncanny X-Men Vol. 2	1980-1982	Uncanny X-Men #132–153, Annual #4–5; Avengers Annual #10; Phoenix: The Untold Story (one-shot); material from Marvel Fanfare #1–4; Marvel Treasury Edition #26–27; Marvel Team-Up #100; Bizarre Adventures #27	#132–153	912	10 Nov 2020	John Byrne cover: 978-1302926342
2	The Uncanny X-Men Vol. 2	1980-1982	Uncanny X-Men #132–153, Annual #4–5; Avengers Annual #10; Phoenix: The Untold Story (one-shot); material from Marvel Fanfare #1–4; Marvel Treasury Edition #26–27; Marvel Team-Up #100; Bizarre Adventures #27	#132–153	912	15 Oct 2024	Stuart Immonen cover: 978-1302959074
2	The Uncanny X-Men Vol. 2	1980-1982	Uncanny X-Men #132–153, Annual #4–5; Avengers Annual #10; Phoenix: The Untold Story (one-shot); material from Marvel Fanfare #1–4; Marvel Treasury Edition #26–27; Marvel Team-Up #100; Bizarre Adventures #27	#132–153	912	15 Oct 2024	John Byrne DM cover: 978-1302959081
3	The Uncanny X-Men Vol. 3	1982-1983	Uncanny X-Men #154–175, Annual #6–7; Marvel Graphic Novel No. 5 – X-Men: God Loves, Man Kills; Wolverine (1982) #1–4; X-Men Special Edition (1983) #1; Magik #1–4	#154–175	1,056	16 Feb 2016	Jerome Opena cover: 978-0785199229
3	The Uncanny X-Men Vol. 3	1982-1983	Uncanny X-Men #154–175, Annual #6–7; Marvel Graphic Novel No. 5 – X-Men: God Loves, Man Kills; Wolverine (1982) #1–4; X-Men Special Edition (1983) #1; Magik #1–4	#154–175	1,056	16 Feb 2016	Paul Smith DM cover: 978-0785199236
3	The Uncanny X-Men Vol. 3	1982-1983	Uncanny X-Men #154–175, Annual #6–7; Marvel Graphic Novel No. 5 – X-Men: God Loves, Man Kills; Wolverine (1982) #1–4; X-Men Special Edition (1983) #1; Magik #1–4	#154–175	1,056	5 Jan 2021	Jerome Opena cover: 978-1302927028
3	The Uncanny X-Men Vol. 3	1982-1983	Uncanny X-Men #154–175, Annual #6–7; Marvel Graphic Novel No. 5 – X-Men: God Loves, Man Kills; Wolverine (1982) #1–4; X-Men Special Edition (1983) #1; Magik #1–4	#154–175	1,056	5 Jan 2021	Paul Smith DM cover: 978-1302927035
4	The Uncanny X-Men Vol. 4	1983-1985	Uncanny X-Men #176–193, Annual #8; Kitty Pryde and Wolverine #1–6; X-Men and Alpha Flight (1985) #1–2; material from Marvel Fanfare #40	#176–193	848	16 Feb 2021	R. B. Silva cover: 978-1302927042
4	The Uncanny X-Men Vol. 4	1983-1985	Uncanny X-Men #176–193, Annual #8; Kitty Pryde and Wolverine #1–6; X-Men and Alpha Flight (1985) #1–2; material from Marvel Fanfare #40	#176–193	848	16 Feb 2021	John Romita Jr. DM cover: 978-1302927059
5	The Uncanny X-Men Vol. 5	1985-1986	Uncanny X-Men #194–209, Annual #9–10; New Mutants Special Edition #1; New Mutants Annual #2; Nightcrawler (1985) #1–4; Longshot (1985) #1–6; material from Marvel Fanfare #33	#194–209	1,064	13 Jun 2023	John Romita Jr. cover: 978-1302948719
5	The Uncanny X-Men Vol. 5	1985-1986	Uncanny X-Men #194–209, Annual #9–10; New Mutants Special Edition #1; New Mutants Annual #2; Nightcrawler (1985) #1–4; Longshot (1985) #1–6; material from Marvel Fanfare #33	#194–209	1,064	13 Jun 2023	Barry Windsor-Smith DM cover: 978-1302948726
6	The Uncanny X-Men Vol. 6	1986-1987	Uncanny X-Men #210-231; X-Men Annual #11; Mephisto Vs. #3-4; Spider-Man Vs. Wolverine #1; Fantastic Four vs X-Men #1-4; X-Men vs Avengers #1-4; material from Marvel Fanfare #38; Best of Marvel (1987); Official Handbook of the Marvel Universe: Deluxe Edition (1985)	#210-231	1,208	27 Oct 2026	Marc Silvestri cover: 978-1302968502
6	The Uncanny X-Men Vol. 6	1986-1987	Uncanny X-Men #210-231; X-Men Annual #11; Mephisto Vs. #3-4; Spider-Man Vs. Wolverine #1; Fantastic Four vs X-Men #1-4; X-Men vs Avengers #1-4; material from Marvel Fanfare #38; Best of Marvel (1987); Official Handbook of the Marvel Universe: Deluxe Edition (1985)	#210-231	1,208	27 Oct 2026	Barry Windsor-Smith DM cover: 978-1302968519
Jump to: Phoenix
Jump to: Mutant Massacre (#194-219)
Jump to: Fall of the Mutants (#220-227)
Jump to: Inferno (#228-243)
1	X-Men by Chris Claremont and Jim Lee Vol. 1	1989-1990	Uncanny X-Men #244–269, Annual #13; Classic X-Men #39	#244-269	720	20 Apr 2011	Jim Lee Magneto & Team cover: 978-0785158226
1	X-Men by Chris Claremont and Jim Lee Vol. 1	1989-1990	Uncanny X-Men #244–269, Annual #13; Classic X-Men #39	#244-269	720	20 Apr 2011	Jim Lee Havok & Team DM cover: 978-0785158233
1	X-Men by Chris Claremont and Jim Lee Vol. 1	1989-1990	Uncanny X-Men #244–269, Annual #13; Classic X-Men #39	#244-269	720	19 Jan 2021	Jim Lee Magneto & Team cover: 978-1302927127
1	X-Men by Chris Claremont and Jim Lee Vol. 1	1989-1990	Uncanny X-Men #244–269, Annual #13; Classic X-Men #39	#244-269	720	19 Jan 2021	Jim Lee Havok & Team DM cover: 978-1302927134
Jump to: X-Tinction Agenda (#270–272)
2	X-Men by Chris Claremont and Jim Lee Vol. 2	1991-1992	Uncanny X-Men #273–280; X-Factor #63–70; X-Men (1991) #1–9, material from #10–11; Ghost Rider (1990) #26–27	#273-280	832	28 Jan 2012	Jim Lee Wolverine and the X-Men cover: 978-0785159056
2	X-Men by Chris Claremont and Jim Lee Vol. 2	1991-1992	Uncanny X-Men #273–280; X-Factor #63–70; X-Men (1991) #1–9, material from #10–11; Ghost Rider (1990) #26–27	#273-280	832	28 Jan 2012	Jim Lee 275th Issue DM cover: 978-0785159063
2	X-Men by Chris Claremont and Jim Lee Vol. 2	1991-1992	Uncanny X-Men #273–280; X-Factor #63–70; X-Men (1991) #1–9, material from #10–11; Ghost Rider (1990) #26–27	#273-280	832	11 Feb 2021	Jim Lee Wolverine and the X-Men cover: 978-1302927141
2	X-Men by Chris Claremont and Jim Lee Vol. 2	1991-1992	Uncanny X-Men #273–280; X-Factor #63–70; X-Men (1991) #1–9, material from #10–11; Ghost Rider (1990) #26–27	#273-280	832	11 Feb 2021	Jim Lee 275th Issue DM cover: 978-1302927158
1	X-Men: Blue & Gold - Mutant Genesis	1991-1993, 2008	X-Men (1991) #1-16, Annual #1; Uncanny X-Men #281-297, Annual #16; Ghost Rider (1990) #26-27; X-Factor #84-86; X-Force #16-18; Stryfe's Strike File; material from X-Factor Annual #7; X-Force Annual #1; Marvel Comics Presents #89; X-Men: Odd Men Out	#281-297	1,360	9 Sep 2025	Jim Lee cover: 978-1302965365
1	X-Men: Blue & Gold - Mutant Genesis	1991-1993, 2008	X-Men (1991) #1-16, Annual #1; Uncanny X-Men #281-297, Annual #16; Ghost Rider (1990) #26-27; X-Factor #84-86; X-Force #16-18; Stryfe's Strike File; material from X-Factor Annual #7; X-Force Annual #1; Marvel Comics Presents #89; X-Men: Odd Men Out	#281-297	1,360	9 Sep 2025	Jim Lee Fallout! DM cover: 978-1302965372
Jump to: Fatal Attractions (#298–305)
2	X-Men: Blue & Gold - Fatal Attractions	1993-1994	Uncanny X-Men #298–306, Annual #17; X-Men (1991) #17-25; X-Men Unlimited #1–2; X-Factor #92; X-Force #25; Wolverine (1988) #75; Excalibur #71; Gambit #1-4; X-Men: Survival Guide to the Mansion	#298-306	TBC	Jul 2027	Andy Kubert cover: TBC
2	X-Men: Blue & Gold - Fatal Attractions	1993-1994	Uncanny X-Men #298–306, Annual #17; X-Men (1991) #17-25; X-Men Unlimited #1–2; X-Factor #92; X-Force #25; Wolverine (1988) #75; Excalibur #71; Gambit #1-4; X-Men: Survival Guide to the Mansion	#298-306	TBC	Jul 2027	Greg Capullo DM cover: TBC
3	X-Men: Blue & Gold - Bloodties	1993-1994	Uncanny X-Men #307-314, Annual #18; X-Men (1991) #26-35, Annual #2; Avengers #368-369; Avengers West Coast #101; Cable #6-8;X-Men Unlimited #3-5; X-Men: The Wedding Album; What If...? (1989) #60; Adventures of Cyclops and Phoenix #1-4; X-Men Ashcan Edition	#307-314	1,120	25 Aug 2026	Andy Kubert cover: 978-1302969707
3	X-Men: Blue & Gold - Bloodties	1993-1994	Uncanny X-Men #307-314, Annual #18; X-Men (1991) #26-35, Annual #2; Avengers #368-369; Avengers West Coast #101; Cable #6-8;X-Men Unlimited #3-5; X-Men: The Wedding Album; What If...? (1989) #60; Adventures of Cyclops and Phoenix #1-4; X-Men Ashcan Edition	#307-314	1,120	25 Aug 2026	John Romita Jr. DM cover: 978-1302969714
Jump to: Age of Apocalypse (#320–321)
Jump to: Onslaught (#322–340)
	X-Men: The Trial of Gambit	1997	Uncanny X-Men #341-350, -1; X-Men #62-64, -1; Imperial Guard #1-3; Psylocke & Archangel - Crimson Dawn #1-4; Gambit (1997) #1-4; Bishop: Xavier Security Enforcer #1-3; Marvel Fanfare (1996) #4-5; Longshot; material from Marvel Valentine's Special (1997)	#341-350	864	19 May 2026	Joe Madureira cover: 978-1302968908
	X-Men: The Trial of Gambit	1997	Uncanny X-Men #341-350, -1; X-Men #62-64, -1; Imperial Guard #1-3; Psylocke & Archangel - Crimson Dawn #1-4; Gambit (1997) #1-4; Bishop: Xavier Security Enforcer #1-3; Marvel Fanfare (1996) #4-5; Longshot; material from Marvel Valentine's Special (1997)	#341-350	864	19 May 2026	Carlos Pacheco DM cover: 978-1302968915
	X-Men vs. Apocalypse: The Twelve	1999-2000	Uncanny X-Men #371–380, Annual '99; X-Men (1991) #91–93, 94 (A-story), 95–99, Annual '99; X-Men Unlimited #24 (A-story), 25–26; Gambit (1999) #8–9; Astonishing X-Men (1999) #1–3; Wolverine (1988) #145–149; Cable #71–78; X-Man #59–60; X-51 #8; X-Force #101; X-Men 1999 Yearbook	#371-380	1,280	18 Feb 2020	Jim Cheung cover: 978-1302922870
	X-Men: Revolution by Chris Claremont	2000-2001	X-Men (1991) #100–109, Annual 2000; Uncanny X-Men #381–389; X-Men Unlimited (1993) #27–29; X-Men: Black Sun #1–5; Bishop: The Last X-Man #15–16; Cable (1993) #87	#381-389	904	14 Aug 2018	Arthur Adams cover: 978-1302912147
	New X-Men	2001-2004	New X-Men (2001) #114–154; Annual #1		1,120	6 Dec 2006	Frank Quitely First Issue cover: 978-0785123262
	New X-Men	2001-2004	New X-Men (2001) #114–154; Annual #1		1,120	15 Aug 2012	Frank Quitely First Issue cover: 978-0785165057
	New X-Men	2001-2004	New X-Men (2001) #114–154; Annual #1		1,120	20 Sep 2016	Frank Quitely First Issue cover: 978-1302901967
	New X-Men	2001-2004	New X-Men (2001) #114–154; Annual #1		1,120	27 Jun 2023	Frank Quitely First Issue cover: 978-1302949846
	New X-Men	2001-2004	New X-Men (2001) #114–154; Annual #1		1,120	27 Jun 2023	Frank Quitely Promo DM cover: 978-1302949853
1	X-Treme X-Men by Chris Claremont Vol. 1	2001-2003	Uncanny X-Men #389; X-Men (1991) #109; X-Treme X-Men #1–24, Annual 2001; X-Treme X-Men: Savage Land #1–4; X-Treme X-Men X-Posé #1–2; material from X-Men Unlimited (1993) #36		888	25 Oct 2022	Salvador Larroca First Issue cover: 978-1302946395
1	X-Treme X-Men by Chris Claremont Vol. 1	2001-2003	Uncanny X-Men #389; X-Men (1991) #109; X-Treme X-Men #1–24, Annual 2001; X-Treme X-Men: Savage Land #1–4; X-Treme X-Men X-Posé #1–2; material from X-Men Unlimited (1993) #36		888	25 Oct 2022	Salvador Larroca DM cover: 978-1302946401
2	X-Treme X-Men by Chris Claremont Vol. 2	2002-2004, 2010	Mekanix #1–6; X-Treme X-Men #25–46; X-Women #1; material from X-Men Unlimited (1993) #39		816	20 Aug 2024	Salvador Larroca Storm & Wolverine Cover: 978-1302954031
2	X-Treme X-Men by Chris Claremont Vol. 2	2002-2004, 2010	Mekanix #1–6; X-Treme X-Men #25–46; X-Women #1; material from X-Men Unlimited (1993) #39		816	20 Aug 2024	Salvador Larroca Cable DM cover: 978-1302954048
	Astonishing X-Men by Joss Whedon and John Cassaday	2004-2008	Astonishing X-Men (2004) #1–24; Giant-Size Astonishing X-Men #1		672	27 Oct 2010	John Cassaday cover: 978-0785138013
	Astonishing X-Men by Joss Whedon and John Cassaday	2004-2008	Astonishing X-Men (2004) #1–24; Giant-Size Astonishing X-Men #1		672	8 Apr 2020	John Cassaday cover: 978-1302922689
	Astonishing X-Men by Joss Whedon and John Cassaday	2004-2008	Astonishing X-Men (2004) #1–24; Giant-Size Astonishing X-Men #1		672	8 Apr 2020	John Cassaday Wolverine Reading DM cover: 978-1302923983
Jump to: House of M
	X-Men: Decimation	2005-2006	House of M #8; Mutopia X #5; Decimation: House of M - The Day After; X-Men (1991) #177–179; New X-Men (2004) #20–24; X-Factor (2005) #1–4; Generation M (2005) #1–5; Son of M #1–6; X-Men: The 198 #1–5; Sentinel Squad O*N*E #1–5; New Avengers (2004) #16–20; X-Men Unlimited (2004) #13; X-Men: The 198 Files		1,088	10 Dec 2024	Salvador Larroca cover: 978-1302960247
	X-Men: Decimation	2005-2006	House of M #8; Mutopia X #5; Decimation: House of M - The Day After; X-Men (1991) #177–179; New X-Men (2004) #20–24; X-Factor (2005) #1–4; Generation M (2005) #1–5; Son of M #1–6; X-Men: The 198 #1–5; Sentinel Squad O*N*E #1–5; New Avengers (2004) #16–20; X-Men Unlimited (2004) #13; X-Men: The 198 Files		1,088	10 Dec 2024	Esad Ribić DM cover: 978-1302960254
Jump to: War of Kings (#475-486)
	X-Men: The Messiah Trilogy	2008-2010	Uncanny X-Men #492-494, 523-525; X-Men #205-207; X-Men: Messiah Complex; New X-Men #44-46; X-Factor (2005) #25-27; X-Men: Messiah Complex - Mutant Files; X-Men: The Time and Life of Lucas Bishop #1-3; Cable (2008) #11-15; X-Force/Cable: Messiah War; X-Force (2008) #14-15; 26-28; X-Men: Future History - The Messiah War Sourcebook; Second Coming Prepare; Second Coming #1-2; New Mutants (2009) #12-14; X-Men Legacy #235-237	#492-494, #523-525	1,112	23 Jun 2026	David Finch cover: 978-1302966737
	X-Men: The Messiah Trilogy	2008-2010	Uncanny X-Men #492-494, 523-525; X-Men #205-207; X-Men: Messiah Complex; New X-Men #44-46; X-Factor (2005) #25-27; X-Men: Messiah Complex - Mutant Files; X-Men: The Time and Life of Lucas Bishop #1-3; Cable (2008) #11-15; X-Force/Cable: Messiah War; X-Force (2008) #14-15; 26-28; X-Men: Future History - The Messiah War Sourcebook; Second Coming Prepare; Second Coming #1-2; New Mutants (2009) #12-14; X-Men Legacy #235-237	#492-494, #523-525	1,112	23 Jun 2026	Adi Granov DM cover: 978-1302966720
	Uncanny X-Men by Kieron Gillen	2009-2012	S.W.O.R.D. #1–5; Uncanny X-Men #534.1, 535–544; X-Men: Regenesis #1; Uncanny X-Men (2011) #1–20, AVX: Consequences (2012) #1–5	#535-564	1,000	14 Apr 2026	Terry Dodson cover: 978-1302967055
	Uncanny X-Men by Kieron Gillen	2009-2012	S.W.O.R.D. #1–5; Uncanny X-Men #534.1, 535–544; X-Men: Regenesis #1; Uncanny X-Men (2011) #1–20, AVX: Consequences (2012) #1–5	#535-564	1,000	14 Apr 2026	Carlos Pacheco DM cover: 978-1302967062
Jump to: Avengers vs. X-Men
	X-Men: Legacy – Legion	2012-2014	X-Men: Legacy #1–24		528	18 Apr 2017	Mike Del Mundo cover: 978-1302903923
	X-Men: Legacy – Legion	2012-2014	X-Men: Legacy #1–24		528	22 Sep 2026	Mike Del Mundo cover: 978-1302969950
	X-Men: Legacy – Legion	2012-2014	X-Men: Legacy #1–24		528	22 Sep 2026	Kaare Andrews DM cover: 978-1302969967
	All-New X-Men by Brian Michael Bendis	2012-2015	All-New X-Men #1–15, 18-41; Guardians of the Galaxy (2013) #11-13		1,048	12 Aug 2025	Stuart Immonen cover: 978-1302966348
	All-New X-Men by Brian Michael Bendis	2012-2015	All-New X-Men #1–15, 18-41; Guardians of the Galaxy (2013) #11-13		1,048	12 Aug 2025	Alex Ross DM cover: 978-1302966355
	Uncanny X-Men by Brian Michael Bendis	2013-2015	Uncanny X-Men (2013) #1–14, 15.INH, 16-35, 600, Annual (2014); All-New X-Men #16-17, Annual (2014); Wolverine and the X-Men #36-37; X-Men: Battle of the Atom #1-2; X-Men (2013) #5-6	#565-600	1,128	25 Nov 2025	Chris Bachalo cover: 978-1302966454
	Uncanny X-Men by Brian Michael Bendis	2013-2015	Uncanny X-Men (2013) #1–14, 15.INH, 16-35, 600, Annual (2014); All-New X-Men #16-17, Annual (2014); Wolverine and the X-Men #36-37; X-Men: Battle of the Atom #1-2; X-Men (2013) #5-6	#565-600	1,128	25 Nov 2025	Ed McGuinness DM cover: 978-1302966461
	X-Men by Marc Guggenheim	2017-2018; 2008-2023	Young X-Men (2008) #1-12; X-Men (2013) #18-22; X-Tinction Agenda (2015) #1-4; X-Men Prime; X-Men Gold (2017) #1-36, Annual (2018); X-Men Blue (2017) #13-15; X-Men: The Wedding Special; X-Men: Days of Future Past - Doomsday #1-4; material from X-Men: Manifest Destiny 3; X-Men: To Serve and Protect		1,552	14 Oct 2025	Ken Lashley cover: 978-1302966164
	X-Men by Marc Guggenheim	2017-2018; 2008-2023	Young X-Men (2008) #1-12; X-Men (2013) #18-22; X-Tinction Agenda (2015) #1-4; X-Men Prime; X-Men Gold (2017) #1-36, Annual (2018); X-Men Blue (2017) #13-15; X-Men: The Wedding Special; X-Men: Days of Future Past - Doomsday #1-4; material from X-Men: Manifest Destiny 3; X-Men: To Serve and Protect		1,552	14 Oct 2025	Arthur Adams DM cover: 978-1302966171
	X-Men by Jonathan Hickman	2019-2021	X-Men (2019) #1–11, 16–21; Giant-Size X-Men: Jean Grey and Emma Frost #1; Nightcrawler #1; Magneto #1; Fantomex #1; Storm #1; material from Incoming! #1	#645-656, #660-665	704	29 Mar 2022	Leinil Francis Yu cover: 978-1302929985
	X-Men by Jonathan Hickman	2019-2021	X-Men (2019) #1–11, 16–21; Giant-Size X-Men: Jean Grey and Emma Frost #1; Nightcrawler #1; Magneto #1; Fantomex #1; Storm #1; material from Incoming! #1	#645-656, #660-665	704	29 Mar 2022	Russell Dauterman DM cover: 978-1302932084
1	X-Men: Age of Krakoa - Dawn of X Vol. 1	2019-2020	X-Men (2019) #1-7; X-Force (2019) #1-8; Marauders #1-8; Excalibur (2019) #1-8; Fallen Angels (2019) #1-6; New Mutants (2019) #1-7; Wolverine (2020) #2-3; Giant-Sized X-Men: Jean Grey and Emma Frost #1; material from Wolverine (2020) #1	#645-651	1,472	16 Sep 2025	Leinil Francis Yu cover: 978-1302966362
1	X-Men: Age of Krakoa - Dawn of X Vol. 1	2019-2020	X-Men (2019) #1-7; X-Force (2019) #1-8; Marauders #1-8; Excalibur (2019) #1-8; Fallen Angels (2019) #1-6; New Mutants (2019) #1-7; Wolverine (2020) #2-3; Giant-Sized X-Men: Jean Grey and Emma Frost #1; material from Wolverine (2020) #1	#645-651	1,472	16 Sep 2025	Russell Dauterman DM cover: 978-1302966379
2	X-Men: Age of Krakoa - Dawn of X Vol. 2	2020	New Mutants (2019) #9-12; X-Men/Fantastic Four (2020) #1-4; Cable (2020) #1-4; X-Men (2019) #8-11; X-Force (2019) #9-12; Excalibur (2019) #9-12; Giant-Sized X-Men: Nightcrawler; Hellions (2020) #1-4; Wolverine (2020) #4-5; X-Factor (2020) #1-3; Giant-Sized X-Men: Magneto; Empyre: X-Men #1-4; Giant-Sized X-Men: Fantomex; Giant-Sized X-Men: Storm; material from Wolverine (2020) #1	#652-655	1,320	17 Mar 2026	Russell Dauterman cover: 978-1302966553
2	X-Men: Age of Krakoa - Dawn of X Vol. 2	2020	New Mutants (2019) #9-12; X-Men/Fantastic Four (2020) #1-4; Cable (2020) #1-4; X-Men (2019) #8-11; X-Force (2019) #9-12; Excalibur (2019) #9-12; Giant-Sized X-Men: Nightcrawler; Hellions (2020) #1-4; Wolverine (2020) #4-5; X-Factor (2020) #1-3; Giant-Sized X-Men: Magneto; Empyre: X-Men #1-4; Giant-Sized X-Men: Fantomex; Giant-Sized X-Men: Storm; material from Wolverine (2020) #1	#652-655	1,320	17 Mar 2026	Ben Oliver DM cover: 978-1302966560
X-Men legacy numbers #656-659 can be found in oversized hardcover format
3	X-Men: Age of Krakoa - Reign of X Omnibus Vol. 1	2020-2021	Cable (2020) #7-9; Excalibur (2019) #16-17; Hellions (2020) #7-8; Juggernaut (2020) #1-5; King in Black: Marauders (2021); Marauders (2019) #16-19; New Mutants (2019) #14-17; S.W.O.R.D. (2020) #1-4; Wolverine (2020) #8-10; X-Factor (2020) #5-6; X-Force (2019) #15-19; X-Men (2019) #16-19	#660-663	1,040	29 Sep 2026	Mahmud Asrar cover: 978-1302967154
3	X-Men: Age of Krakoa - Reign of X Omnibus Vol. 1	2020-2021	Cable (2020) #7-9; Excalibur (2019) #16-17; Hellions (2020) #7-8; Juggernaut (2020) #1-5; King in Black: Marauders (2021); Marauders (2019) #16-19; New Mutants (2019) #14-17; S.W.O.R.D. (2020) #1-4; Wolverine (2020) #8-10; X-Factor (2020) #5-6; X-Force (2019) #15-19; X-Men (2019) #16-19	#660-663	1,040	29 Sep 2026	Leinil Yu DM cover: 978-1302967161
4	X-Men: Age of Krakoa - Reign of X Omnibus Vol. 2	2020-2021, 1986	Cable (2020) #10-12; Children of the Atom #1-6; Excalibur (2019) #18-21; Hellions #9-12; Marauders #20-21; New Mutants (2019) #18-19; Planet-Size X-Men; S.W.O.R.D. (2020) #5-6; Way of X #1-3; Wolverine (2020) #11-13; X-Corp #1-2; X-Factor (2020) #7-10; X-Force (2019) #20; X-Men (2019) #20-21; X-Men Vote Comic Strips #1-5; Hellfire Gala Guide; material from Classic X-Men #7; Marvel's Voices; Marvel's Voices: Indigenous Voices; Marvel’s Voices: Legacy; Marvel’s Voices: Pride, Women of Marvel (2021)	#664-665	1,232	16 Feb 2027	Leinil Yu cover: 978-1302971816
4	X-Men: Age of Krakoa - Reign of X Omnibus Vol. 2	2020-2021, 1986		#664-665	1,232	16 Feb 2027	Pepe Larraz DM cover: 978-1302971823
Jump to: A.X.E.: Judgment Day
	X-Men by Al Ewing	2020-2024	S.W.O.R.D. (2020) #1-11; X-Men: Red #1-15, 17-18; Storm and the Brotherhood of Mutants #1-3; Resurrection of Magneto #1-4; Cable: Reloaded; X-Men: Before the Fall - Heralds of Apocalypse; Marvel's Voices: X-Men; material from X-Men: Red #16		1,136	11 Nov 2025	Stefano Caselli cover: 978-1302966423
	X-Men by Al Ewing	2020-2024	S.W.O.R.D. (2020) #1-11; X-Men: Red #1-15, 17-18; Storm and the Brotherhood of Mutants #1-3; Resurrection of Magneto #1-4; Cable: Reloaded; X-Men: Before the Fall - Heralds of Apocalypse; Marvel's Voices: X-Men; material from X-Men: Red #16		1,136	11 Nov 2025	Felipe Massafera DM cover: 978-1302966430
	Way of X	2021-2023	Way of X #1-5; X-Men: The Onslaught Revelation; Legion of X #1-10; X-Men: Before the Fall - Sons of X; Uncanny Spider-Man #1-5; X-Men Blue: Origins; Nightcrawlers #1-3		764	29 Sep 2026	Giuseppe Camuncoli cover: 978-1302969936
	Way of X	2021-2023	Way of X #1-5; X-Men: The Onslaught Revelation; Legion of X #1-10; X-Men: Before the Fall - Sons of X; Uncanny Spider-Man #1-5; X-Men Blue: Origins; Nightcrawlers #1-3		764	29 Sep 2026	DM cover: TBC
	X-Men by Gerry Duggan	2021-2024	X-Men (2021) #1-34, Annual (2022); Planet-Size X-Men; X-Men: Hellfire Gala (2022), (2023); X-Men Unlimited: X-Men Green	#666-699	1,304	28 Oct 2025	Pepe Larraz cover: 978-1302961435
	X-Men by Gerry Duggan	2021-2024	X-Men (2021) #1-34, Annual (2022); Planet-Size X-Men; X-Men: Hellfire Gala (2022), (2023); X-Men Unlimited: X-Men Green	#666-699	1,304	28 Oct 2025	Joshua Cassara DM cover: 978-1302961442
	X-Men: Age of Krakoa by Kieron Gillen	2021-2023	Immortal X-Men (2022) #1-18; Sins of Sinister (2023); Immoral X-Men (2023) #1-3; Sins of Sinister: Dominion (2023); X-Men: Before the Fall - Sinister Four ; X-Men: Forever (2024) #1-4		832	20 Oct 2026	Leinil Yu cover: 978-1302966706
	X-Men: Age of Krakoa by Kieron Gillen	2021-2023	Immortal X-Men (2022) #1-18; Sins of Sinister (2023); Immoral X-Men (2023) #1-3; Sins of Sinister: Dominion (2023); X-Men: Before the Fall - Sinister Four ; X-Men: Forever (2024) #1-4		832	20 Oct 2026	Mark Brooks DM cover: 978-1302966713
	X-Men: Fall of the House of X / Rise of the Powers of X	2023-2024	Fall of the House of X #1-5; Rise of the Powers of X #1-5; X-Men (2021) #30-34; Resurrection of Magneto #1-4; Dead X-Men #1-4; X-Men Forever #1-4; Invincible Iron Man (2022) #13-20; Avengers (2023) #12-13; Ms Marvel: Mutant Menace #1-4; Cable (2024) #1-4; material from X-Men (2021) #35		1,248	5 Aug 2025	Mark Brooks cover: 978-1302956578
	X-Men: Fall of the House of X / Rise of the Powers of X	2023-2024	Fall of the House of X #1-5; Rise of the Powers of X #1-5; X-Men (2021) #30-34; Resurrection of Magneto #1-4; Dead X-Men #1-4; X-Men Forever #1-4; Invincible Iron Man (2022) #13-20; Avengers (2023) #12-13; Ms Marvel: Mutant Menace #1-4; Cable (2024) #1-4; material from X-Men (2021) #35		1,248	5 Aug 2025	David Nakayama DM cover: 978-1302956820
	X-Men: Fall of the House of X / Rise of the Powers of X	2023-2024	Fall of the House of X #1-5; Rise of the Powers of X #1-5; X-Men (2021) #30-34; Resurrection of Magneto #1-4; Dead X-Men #1-4; X-Men Forever #1-4; Invincible Iron Man (2022) #13-20; Avengers (2023) #12-13; Ms Marvel: Mutant Menace #1-4; Cable (2024) #1-4; material from X-Men (2021) #35		1,248	5 Aug 2025	Pepe Larraz DM cover: 978-1302965228
	X-Men: The Animated Series – The Adaptations	1992-1996	X-Men: The Animated Series #1–15; X-Men Adventures (1994) #1–13; X-Men Adventures (1995) #1–13		1,008	7 Feb 2023	Steve Lightle cover: 978-1302947774
	X-Men: The Animated Series – The Adaptations	1992-1996	X-Men: The Animated Series #1–15; X-Men Adventures (1994) #1–13; X-Men Adventures (1995) #1–13		1,008	7 Feb 2023	Kerry Gammill DM cover: 978-1302947781
	Cosmic X-Men	1977-2022	X-Men #105, 107–108, 137; Uncanny X-Men #154–158, 161–167, 276—277, 475–486; Astonishing X-Men (2004) #19–24; Giant-Size Astonishing X-Men #1; Mr. and Mrs. X #1–5; Marauders (2022) #1–5; material from Uncanny X-Men #274–275		1,200	25 Mar 2025	John Cassaday cover: 978-1302964276
	Cosmic X-Men	1977-2022	X-Men #105, 107–108, 137; Uncanny X-Men #154–158, 161–167, 276—277, 475–486; Astonishing X-Men (2004) #19–24; Giant-Size Astonishing X-Men #1; Mr. and Mrs. X #1–5; Marauders (2022) #1–5; material from Uncanny X-Men #274–275		1,200	25 Mar 2025	Dave Cockrum DM cover: 978-1302964283
	X-Men: Grand Design	1963-2019	X-Men: Grand Design #1–2; X-Men: Grand Design – Second Genesis #1–2; X-Men: Grand Design – X-tinction #1–2; X-Men #1; Giant-Size X-Men #1; Uncanny X-Men #268		488	16 Sep 2020	Ed Piskor cover: 978-1302925246
Jump to: Ultimate X-Men
Jump to: X-Men 2099

=== X-Statix ===
#	Title	Years covered	Material collected	Pages	Released	ISBN
	X-Statix	2001-2006	X-Force #116–129; Brotherhood #9; X-Statix #1–26; Dead Girl #1–5; Wolverine/Doop #1–2; material from X-Men Unlimited #41; I ♥ Marvel: My Mutant Heart and Nation X #4	1,200	16 Nov 2011	Mike Allred cover: 978-0785158448

=== Young Avengers ===
#	Title	Years covered	Material collected	Pages	Released	ISBN
	Young Avengers by Heinberg & Cheung	2005-2012	Young Avengers (2005) #1–12, Young Avengers Special; Civil War: Young Avengers & Runaways #1–4; Young Avengers Presents #1–6; Secret Invasion: Runaways/Young Avengers #1–3; Dark Reign: Young Avengers #1–5; Siege: Young Avengers #1; Avengers: The Children's Crusade #1–9; Avengers: The Children's Crusade - Young Avengers #1; Young Avengers (2005) #1 Director's Cut; material from Uncanny X-Men #526	1,080	18 Oct 2022	Jim Cheung Patriot cover: 978-1302933890
	Young Avengers by Heinberg & Cheung	2005-2012	Young Avengers (2005) #1–12, Young Avengers Special; Civil War: Young Avengers & Runaways #1–4; Young Avengers Presents #1–6; Secret Invasion: Runaways/Young Avengers #1–3; Dark Reign: Young Avengers #1–5; Siege: Young Avengers #1; Avengers: The Children's Crusade #1–9; Avengers: The Children's Crusade - Young Avengers #1; Young Avengers (2005) #1 Director's Cut; material from Uncanny X-Men #526	1,080	18 Oct 2022	Jim Cheung Scarlet Witch DM cover: 978-1302933906
	Young Avengers by Kieron Gillen & Jamie McKelvie	2013	Young Avengers (2013) #1–15; Marvel NOW! Point One #1 (Young Avengers Story)	360	16 Dec 2014	Jamie McKelvie cover: 978-0785191711
	Young Avengers by Kieron Gillen & Jamie McKelvie	2013	Young Avengers (2013) #1–15; Marvel NOW! Point One #1 (Young Avengers Story)	360	16 Nov 2021	Jamie McKelvie cover: 978-1302930059
	Young Avengers by Kieron Gillen & Jamie McKelvie	2013	Young Avengers (2013) #1–15; Marvel NOW! Point One #1 (Young Avengers Story)	360	16 Nov 2021	Jim Cheung cover: 978-1302930066

== Event omnibuses ==
Marvel's first major line-wide event was Marvel Super Heroes Secret Wars in 1984. The event "capitalized on the success of previous crossovers to make an epic storyline involving most of the Marvel Universe". It also introduced Spider-Man's black costume - and ultimately the Venom symbiote.

By the mid-2000s, large comics events had become an annual tradition for Marvel, with Avengers Disassembled (2004), House of M (2005), Civil War (2006-2007) and Secret Invasion (2008) providing enormous sales success.

Marvel have used the omnibus format to collect full events, including the main run of comics, plus all related tie-ins. The breadth of material means the company's largest omnibus is Avengers vs. X-Men, at 1,680 pages. Two more of the top-five longest omnibuses are also events: War of the Realms (1,576) and King in Black (1,568).

=== Absolute Carnage ===
Title	Years covered	Material collected	Pages	Released	ISBN
Absolute Carnage	2019	Absolute Carnage #1–5; Absolute Carnage vs. Deadpool #1–3; Absolute Carnage: Captain Marvel; Absolute Carnage: The Immortal Hulk, and more: Absolute Carnage: Symbiote Spider-Man; Absolute Carnage: Symbiote of Vengeance; Absolute Carnage: Lethal Protectors #1–3; Absolute Carnage: Avengers #1; Absolute Carnage: Miles Morales #1–3; Absolute Carnage: Weapon Plus; Absolute Carnage: Scream #1–3; Absolute Carnage: Separation Anxiety; Amazing Spider-Man #29–31; Venom #16-20; Absolute Carnage stinger pages	880	23 Sep 2020	Ryan Stegman cover: 978-1302925291
Jump to: Carnage

=== Acts of Vengeance ===
#	Title	Years covered	Material collected	Pages	Released	ISBN
1	Acts of Vengeance	1989-1990	Avengers #311–313, Annual #19; Avengers Spotlight #26–29; Avengers West Coast #53–55; Captain America #365–367; Iron Man #251–252; Quasar #5–7; Thor #411–413; Cloak and Dagger (vol. 3) #9; Amazing Spider-Man #326–329; Spectacular Spider-Man #158–160; Web of Spider-Man #59–61	744	2 Feb 2011	Alan Davis cover: 978-0785144649
1	Acts of Vengeance	1989-1990	Avengers #311–313, Annual #19; Avengers Spotlight #26–29; Avengers West Coast #53–55; Captain America #365–367; Iron Man #251–252; Quasar #5–7; Thor #411–413; Cloak and Dagger (vol. 3) #9; Amazing Spider-Man #326–329; Spectacular Spider-Man #158–160; Web of Spider-Man #59–61	744	2 Feb 2011	John Byrne DM cover: 978-0785144656
2	Acts of Vengeance Crossovers	1989-1990	Fantastic Four #334–336; Wolverine (vol. 2) #19–20; Doctor Strange, Sorcerer Supreme #11–13; Incredible Hulk #363; Punisher (vol. 2) #28–29; Punisher War Journal (vol. 2) #12–13; Marc Spector: Moon Knight #8–10; Daredevil #275–276; Power Pack #53; Alpha Flight #79–80; New Mutants #84–86; Uncanny X-Men #256–258; X-Factor #49–50; Damage Control (vol. 2) #1–4; Web of Spider-Man #64–65	768	3 Aug 2011	Alan Davis cover: 978-0785144885
2	Acts of Vengeance Crossovers	1989-1990	Fantastic Four #334–336; Wolverine (vol. 2) #19–20; Doctor Strange, Sorcerer Supreme #11–13; Incredible Hulk #363; Punisher (vol. 2) #28–29; Punisher War Journal (vol. 2) #12–13; Marc Spector: Moon Knight #8–10; Daredevil #275–276; Power Pack #53; Alpha Flight #79–80; New Mutants #84–86; Uncanny X-Men #256–258; X-Factor #49–50; Damage Control (vol. 2) #1–4; Web of Spider-Man #64–65	768	3 Aug 2011	John Byrne DM cover: 978-0785144892

=== Age of Apocalypse ===
#	Title	Years covered	Material collected	Pages	Released	ISBN
1	X-Men: Age of Apocalypse	1995	Uncanny X-Men #320–321; X-Men (1991) #40–41; Cable #20; X-Men Alpha, Amazing X-Men #1–4; Astonishing X-Men (1995) #1–4; Factor X #1–4; Gambit and the X-Ternals #1–4; Generation Next #1–4; Weapon X (1995) #1–4; X-Calibre #1–4; X-Man #1–4; X-Men Omega; Age of Apocalypse: The Chosen; X-Men Ashcan Edition	1,072	23 Mar 2012	Billy Tan cover: 978-0785159827
1	X-Men: Age of Apocalypse	1995	Uncanny X-Men #320–321; X-Men (1991) #40–41; Cable #20; X-Men Alpha, Amazing X-Men #1–4; Astonishing X-Men (1995) #1–4; Factor X #1–4; Gambit and the X-Ternals #1–4; Generation Next #1–4; Weapon X (1995) #1–4; X-Calibre #1–4; X-Man #1–4; X-Men Omega; Age of Apocalypse: The Chosen; X-Men Ashcan Edition	1,072	23 Mar 2012	Joe Madureira DM cover: 978-0785162919
1	X-Men: Age of Apocalypse	1995	Uncanny X-Men #320–321; X-Men (1991) #40–41; Cable #20; X-Men Alpha, Amazing X-Men #1–4; Astonishing X-Men (1995) #1–4; Factor X #1–4; Gambit and the X-Ternals #1–4; Generation Next #1–4; Weapon X (1995) #1–4; X-Calibre #1–4; X-Man #1–4; X-Men Omega; Age of Apocalypse: The Chosen; X-Men Ashcan Edition	1,072	30 Mar 2016	Billy Tan cover: 978-0785195092
1	X-Men: Age of Apocalypse	1995	Uncanny X-Men #320–321; X-Men (1991) #40–41; Cable #20; X-Men Alpha, Amazing X-Men #1–4; Astonishing X-Men (1995) #1–4; Factor X #1–4; Gambit and the X-Ternals #1–4; Generation Next #1–4; Weapon X (1995) #1–4; X-Calibre #1–4; X-Man #1–4; X-Men Omega; Age of Apocalypse: The Chosen; X-Men Ashcan Edition	1,072	2 Jun 2021	Billy Tan cover: 978-1302930028
1	X-Men: Age of Apocalypse	1995	Uncanny X-Men #320–321; X-Men (1991) #40–41; Cable #20; X-Men Alpha, Amazing X-Men #1–4; Astonishing X-Men (1995) #1–4; Factor X #1–4; Gambit and the X-Ternals #1–4; Generation Next #1–4; Weapon X (1995) #1–4; X-Calibre #1–4; X-Man #1–4; X-Men Omega; Age of Apocalypse: The Chosen; X-Men Ashcan Edition	1,072	2 Jun 2021	Joe Madureira DM cover: 978-1302930035
1	X-Men: Age of Apocalypse	1995	Uncanny X-Men #320–321; X-Men (1991) #40–41; Cable #20; X-Men Alpha, Amazing X-Men #1–4; Astonishing X-Men (1995) #1–4; Factor X #1–4; Gambit and the X-Ternals #1–4; Generation Next #1–4; Weapon X (1995) #1–4; X-Calibre #1–4; X-Man #1–4; X-Men Omega; Age of Apocalypse: The Chosen; X-Men Ashcan Edition	1,072	28 Jul 2026	Billy Tan cover: 978-1302970635
1	X-Men: Age of Apocalypse	1995	Uncanny X-Men #320–321; X-Men (1991) #40–41; Cable #20; X-Men Alpha, Amazing X-Men #1–4; Astonishing X-Men (1995) #1–4; Factor X #1–4; Gambit and the X-Ternals #1–4; Generation Next #1–4; Weapon X (1995) #1–4; X-Calibre #1–4; X-Man #1–4; X-Men Omega; Age of Apocalypse: The Chosen; X-Men Ashcan Edition	1,072	28 Jul 2026	Joe Madureira DM cover: 978-1302970642
2	X-Men: Age of Apocalypse Companion	1995-2006	X-Men Chronicles #1–2; Tales from the Age of Apocalypse #1–2; X-Man #−1 and 53–54; Blink #1–4; X-Universe #1–2; Exiles #60–61; X-Men: Age of Apocalypse #1–6 and one-shot; What If? (1989) #77, 81; What If? X-Men: Age of Apocalypse; material from Hulk: Broken Worlds #2, X-Men Prime, X-Man Annual '96, X-Men: Endangered Species, Exiles: Days of Then and Now and The Official Handbook of the Marvel Universe: Age of Apocalypse	992	2 Apr 2014	Adam Kubert cover: 978-0785185147
2	X-Men: Age of Apocalypse Companion	1995-2006	X-Men Chronicles #1–2; Tales from the Age of Apocalypse #1–2; X-Man #−1 and 53–54; Blink #1–4; X-Universe #1–2; Exiles #60–61; X-Men: Age of Apocalypse #1–6 and one-shot; What If? (1989) #77, 81; What If? X-Men: Age of Apocalypse; material from Hulk: Broken Worlds #2, X-Men Prime, X-Man Annual '96, X-Men: Endangered Species, Exiles: Days of Then and Now and The Official Handbook of the Marvel Universe: Age of Apocalypse	992	9 Jun 2021	Adam Kubert cover: 978-1302930004
2	X-Men: Age of Apocalypse Companion	1995-2006	X-Men Chronicles #1–2; Tales from the Age of Apocalypse #1–2; X-Man #−1 and 53–54; Blink #1–4; X-Universe #1–2; Exiles #60–61; X-Men: Age of Apocalypse #1–6 and one-shot; What If? (1989) #77, 81; What If? X-Men: Age of Apocalypse; material from Hulk: Broken Worlds #2, X-Men Prime, X-Man Annual '96, X-Men: Endangered Species, Exiles: Days of Then and Now and The Official Handbook of the Marvel Universe: Age of Apocalypse	992	9 Jun 2021	Bryan Hitch DM cover: 978-1302930011

=== Annihilation ===
#	Title	Years covered	Material collected	Pages	Released	ISBN
1	Annihilation	2005-2007	Drax the Destroyer #1–4; Annihilation: Prologue; Annihilation: Nova #1–4; Annihilation: Silver Surfer #1–4; Annihilation: Super Skrull #1–4; Annihilation: Ronan #1–4, Annihilation #1–6; Annihilation: Heralds of Galactus #1–2; Annihilation: Nova Corps Files	880	7 May 2014	Gabriele Dell'Otto cover: 978-0785188896
1	Annihilation	2005-2007	Drax the Destroyer #1–4; Annihilation: Prologue; Annihilation: Nova #1–4; Annihilation: Silver Surfer #1–4; Annihilation: Super Skrull #1–4; Annihilation: Ronan #1–4, Annihilation #1–6; Annihilation: Heralds of Galactus #1–2; Annihilation: Nova Corps Files	880	4 Dec 2019	Gabriele Dell'Otto cover: 978-1302921651
1	Annihilation	2005-2007	Drax the Destroyer #1–4; Annihilation: Prologue; Annihilation: Nova #1–4; Annihilation: Silver Surfer #1–4; Annihilation: Super Skrull #1–4; Annihilation: Ronan #1–4, Annihilation #1–6; Annihilation: Heralds of Galactus #1–2; Annihilation: Nova Corps Files	880	3 May 2022	Gabriele Dell'Otto cover: 978-1302934071
1	Annihilation	2005-2007	Drax the Destroyer #1–4; Annihilation: Prologue; Annihilation: Nova #1–4; Annihilation: Silver Surfer #1–4; Annihilation: Super Skrull #1–4; Annihilation: Ronan #1–4, Annihilation #1–6; Annihilation: Heralds of Galactus #1–2; Annihilation: Nova Corps Files	880	3 May 2022	Andrea Di Vito DM cover: 978-1302934088
1	Annihilation	2005-2007	Drax the Destroyer #1–4; Annihilation: Prologue; Annihilation: Nova #1–4; Annihilation: Silver Surfer #1–4; Annihilation: Super Skrull #1–4; Annihilation: Ronan #1–4, Annihilation #1–6; Annihilation: Heralds of Galactus #1–2; Annihilation: Nova Corps Files	880	6 May 2025	Gabriele Dell'Otto cover: 978-1302963576
1	Annihilation	2005-2007	Drax the Destroyer #1–4; Annihilation: Prologue; Annihilation: Nova #1–4; Annihilation: Silver Surfer #1–4; Annihilation: Super Skrull #1–4; Annihilation: Ronan #1–4, Annihilation #1–6; Annihilation: Heralds of Galactus #1–2; Annihilation: Nova Corps Files	880	6 May 2025	Andrea Di Vito DM cover: 978-1302963569
2	Annihilation: Conquest	2007-2008	Nova (vol. 4) #1–12, Annual #1; Annihilation: Conquest Prologue #1; Annihilation: Conquest – Star-Lord #1–4; Annihilation: Conquest – Quasar #1–4; Annihilation: Conquest – Wraith #1–4; Annihilation: Conquest #1–6; Annihilation Saga	872	17 Jun 2015	Aleksi Briclot cover: 978-0785192701
2	Annihilation: Conquest	2007-2008	Nova (vol. 4) #1–12, Annual #1; Annihilation: Conquest Prologue #1; Annihilation: Conquest – Star-Lord #1–4; Annihilation: Conquest – Quasar #1–4; Annihilation: Conquest – Wraith #1–4; Annihilation: Conquest #1–6; Annihilation Saga	872	12 May 2021	Aleksi Briclot cover: 978-1302929091
2	Annihilation: Conquest	2007-2008	Nova (vol. 4) #1–12, Annual #1; Annihilation: Conquest Prologue #1; Annihilation: Conquest – Star-Lord #1–4; Annihilation: Conquest – Quasar #1–4; Annihilation: Conquest – Wraith #1–4; Annihilation: Conquest #1–6; Annihilation Saga	872	12 May 2021	Clint Langley DM cover: 978-1302929107
2	Annihilation: Conquest	2007-2008	Nova (vol. 4) #1–12, Annual #1; Annihilation: Conquest Prologue #1; Annihilation: Conquest – Star-Lord #1–4; Annihilation: Conquest – Quasar #1–4; Annihilation: Conquest – Wraith #1–4; Annihilation: Conquest #1–6; Annihilation Saga	872	19 Aug 2025	Aleksi Briclot cover: 978-1302966324
2	Annihilation: Conquest	2007-2008	Nova (vol. 4) #1–12, Annual #1; Annihilation: Conquest Prologue #1; Annihilation: Conquest – Star-Lord #1–4; Annihilation: Conquest – Quasar #1–4; Annihilation: Conquest – Wraith #1–4; Annihilation: Conquest #1–6; Annihilation Saga	872	19 Aug 2025	Clint Langley DM cover: 978-1302966331
Jump to: War of Kings

=== Atlantis Attacks ===
Title	Years covered	Material collected	Pages	Released	ISBN
Atlantis Attacks	1989	Silver Surfer Annual #2; Iron Man Annual #10; Marvel Comics Presents #26; Uncanny X-Men Annual #13; Amazing Spider-Man Annual #23; Punisher Annual #2; Spectacular Spider-Man Annual #9; Daredevil Annual #5; Avengers Annual #18; New Mutants #76, Annual #5; X-Factor Annual #4; Web of Spider-Man Annual #5; Avengers West Coast #56, Annual #4; Thor Annual #14; Fantastic Four Annual #22	552	9 Feb 2011	Mike Mayhew cover: 978-0785144922
Atlantis Attacks	1989	Silver Surfer Annual #2; Iron Man Annual #10; Marvel Comics Presents #26; Uncanny X-Men Annual #13; Amazing Spider-Man Annual #23; Punisher Annual #2; Spectacular Spider-Man Annual #9; Daredevil Annual #5; Avengers Annual #18; New Mutants #76, Annual #5; X-Factor Annual #4; Web of Spider-Man Annual #5; Avengers West Coast #56, Annual #4; Thor Annual #14; Fantastic Four Annual #22	552	9 Feb 2011	Bob Layton DM cover: 978-0785144939

=== Avengers vs. X-Men ===
Title	Years covered	Material collected	Pages	Released	ISBN
Avengers vs. X-Men	2011-2012	Avengers vs. X-Men #0–12; Point One #1 (AVX story); AVX: Vs. #1–6; Avengers vs. X-Men: Infinite #1, 6, 10; Avengers Academy #29–33; Secret Avengers #26–28; Avengers (2010) #25–30; New Avengers (2010) #24–30; X-Men Legacy #266–270; Wolverine and the X-Men #9–16, 18; AVX: Consequences #1–5; Uncanny X-Men (2011) #11–20; A-Babies vs. X-Babies #1	1,680	1 Nov 2022	Jim Cheung Iron Man vs Magneto cover: 978-1302946777
Avengers vs. X-Men	2011-2012	Avengers vs. X-Men #0–12; Point One #1 (AVX story); AVX: Vs. #1–6; Avengers vs. X-Men: Infinite #1, 6, 10; Avengers Academy #29–33; Secret Avengers #26–28; Avengers (2010) #25–30; New Avengers (2010) #24–30; X-Men Legacy #266–270; Wolverine and the X-Men #9–16, 18; AVX: Consequences #1–5; Uncanny X-Men (2011) #11–20; A-Babies vs. X-Babies #1	1,680	1 Nov 2022	Jim Cheung Captain America vs Wolverine DM cover: 978-1302946784

=== A.X.E.: Judgment Day ===
Title	Years covered	Material collected	Pages	Released	ISBN
A.X.E.: Judgment Day	2022	A.X.E.: Eve of Judgment #1, A.X.E.: Judgment Day #1–6, Immortal X-Men #5–7, X-Men Red (2022) #5–7, A.X.E.: Death to the Mutants #1–3, X-Force (2020) #30–33, X-Men (2021) #13–14, Wolverine (2020) #24, Legion of X (2022) #6, Marauders (2022) #6, Fantastic Four (2018) #47–48, Avengers (2018) #60, A.X.E.: Avengers #1, Amazing Spider-Man (2022) #10, A.X.E.: X-Men #1, A.X.E.: Iron Fist #1, A.X.E.: Starfox #1, Captain Marvel (2019) #42, A.X.E.: Eternals #1, A.X.E.: Judgment Day Omega #1, and material from Free Comic Book Day 2022: Avengers/X-Men and Wolverine (2020) #25	904	16 Jan 2024	Mark Brooks cover: 978-1302952907
A.X.E.: Judgment Day	2022		904	16 Jan 2024	Patrick Gleason DM cover: 978-1302952914

=== Blood Hunt ===
Title	Years covered	Material collected	Pages	Released	ISBN
Blood Hunt	2024	Blood Hunt #1-5; Free Comic Book Day 2024: Blood Hunt/X-Men (Blood Hunt story); Amazing Spider-Man (vol. 6) #49; Amazing Spider-Man: Blood Hunt #1-3; Miles Morales: Spider-Man (vol. 2) #21-22; Avengers (vol. 9) #14-16; Black Panther: Blood Hunt #1-3; Strange Academy: Blood Hunt #1-3; Hulk: Blood Hunt; Blood Hunters #1-4; Doctor Strange (vol. 6) #15-17; Dracula: Blood Hunt #1-3; Union Jack the Ripper: Blood Hunt #1-3; Midnight Sons: Blood Hunt #1-3; Werewolf by Night: Blood Hunt; X-Men: Blood Hunt - Jubilee; X-Men: Blood Hunt - Magik; X-Men: Blood Hunt - Psylocke; X-Men: Blood Hunt - Laura Kinney the Wolverine; Wolverine: Blood Hunt #1-4; Fantastic Four (vol. 7) #21-22; Vengeance of the Moon Knight (vol. 2) #5-7; Venom (vol. 5) #33-34	1368	6 Oct 2026	Pepe Larraz cover: 978-1302966652
Blood Hunt	2024		1368	6 Oct 2026	Alex Ross DM cover: 978-1302966669

=== Dark Web ===
Title	Years covered	Material collected	Pages	Released	ISBN
Dark Web	2022-2023	Dark Web #1, Amazing Spider-Man (vol. 6) #14–18, Venom (2021) #13–16, Dark Web: X-Men #1–3, Dark Web: Ms. Marvel #1–2, Dark Web Finale #1, Mary Jane & Black Cat #1–5, Gold Goblin #1–5 and material from FCBD 2022: Spider-Man/Venom	528	4 Feb 2025	John Romita Jr cover: 978-1302961152
Dark Web	2022-2023	Dark Web #1, Amazing Spider-Man (vol. 6) #14–18, Venom (2021) #13–16, Dark Web: X-Men #1–3, Dark Web: Ms. Marvel #1–2, Dark Web Finale #1, Mary Jane & Black Cat #1–5, Gold Goblin #1–5 and material from FCBD 2022: Spider-Man/Venom	528	4 Feb 2025	Ryan Stegman DM cover: 978-1302961169

=== Devil's Reign ===
Title	Years covered	Material collected	Pages	Released	ISBN
Jump to: Daredevil omnibuses
Devil's Reign	2021-2022	Devil's Reign #1–6; Spider-Woman (2020) #18–19; Daredevil: Woman Without Fear #1–3; Devil's Reign: Superior Four #1–3; Devil's Reign: Villains for Hire #1–3; Devil's Reign: Winter Soldier; Devil's Reign: X-Men #1–3; Devil's Reign: Spider-Man; Moon Knight (2021) #8; Devil's Reign: Moon Knight; Devil's Reign: Omega	656	9 Jan 2024	Marco Checchetto cover: 978-1302952921
Devil's Reign	2021-2022	Devil's Reign #1–6; Spider-Woman (2020) #18–19; Daredevil: Woman Without Fear #1–3; Devil's Reign: Superior Four #1–3; Devil's Reign: Villains for Hire #1–3; Devil's Reign: Winter Soldier; Devil's Reign: X-Men #1–3; Devil's Reign: Spider-Man; Moon Knight (2021) #8; Devil's Reign: Moon Knight; Devil's Reign: Omega	656	9 Jan 2024	In-Hyuk Lee DM cover: 978-1302952938

=== Empyre ===
Title	Years covered	Material collected	Pages	Released	ISBN
Empyre	2019-2020	Incoming! #1; Road to Empyre: The Kree/Skrull War; Empyre #0: Avengers; Empyre #0: Fantastic Four: Empyre #0; Empyre #1–6; Empyre: Aftermath - Avengers; Empyre: Fallout - Fantastic Four; Empyre: X-Men #1–4; Lords of Empyre: Emperor Hulkling, Celestial Messiah and Swordsman; Empyre: Savage Avengers; Empyre: Captain America #1–3; Empyre: Avengers #1–3; X-Men (2019) #10–11; Fantastic Four (2018) #21–23; Captain Marvel (2019) #18–21; The Immortal She-Hulk #1; Web of Venom: Empyre's End; Black Panther and the Agents of Wakanda #7–8; Empyre Handbook	1,424	24 Nov 2021	Jim Cheung Avenger/Fantastic Four cover: 978-1302928254
Empyre	2019-2020		1,424	24 Nov 2021	Jim Cheung Hulking/Wiccan DM cover: 978-1302928261

=== The Evolutionary War ===
Title	Years covered	Material collected	Pages	Released	ISBN
The Evolutionary War	1988	X-Factor Annual #3; Punisher Annual #1; Silver Surfer Annual #1; New Mutants Annual #4; Amazing Spider-Man Annual #22; Fantastic Four Annual #21; Uncanny X-Men Annual #12; Web of Spider-Man Annual #4; West Coast Avengers Annual #3; Spectacular Spider-Man Annual #8; Avengers Annual #17	472	14 Sep 2011	Lee Garbett cover: 978-0785155478
The Evolutionary War	1988	X-Factor Annual #3; Punisher Annual #1; Silver Surfer Annual #1; New Mutants Annual #4; Amazing Spider-Man Annual #22; Fantastic Four Annual #21; Uncanny X-Men Annual #12; Web of Spider-Man Annual #4; West Coast Avengers Annual #3; Spectacular Spider-Man Annual #8; Avengers Annual #17	472	14 Sep 2011	John Buscema DM cover: 978-0785155485

=== Fall of the Mutants ===
Title	Years covered	Material collected	Pages	Released	ISBN
X-Men: Fall of the Mutants	1987-1988	New Mutants #55–61; Uncanny X-Men #220–227; X-Factor #18–26; Captain America #339; Daredevil #252; Fantastic Four #312; Incredible Hulk #336–337, 340; Power Pack #35	824	17 May 2022	Alan Davis cover: 978-1302934118
X-Men: Fall of the Mutants	1987-1988	New Mutants #55–61; Uncanny X-Men #220–227; X-Factor #18–26; Captain America #339; Daredevil #252; Fantastic Four #312; Incredible Hulk #336–337, 340; Power Pack #35	824	17 May 2022	Bret Blevins DM cover: 978-1302934125

=== Fatal Attractions ===
Title	Years covered	Material collected	Pages	Released	ISBN
X-Men: Fatal Attractions	1993-1994	Uncanny X-Men #298–305, 315, Annual #17; X-Factor #87–92; X-Men Unlimited #1–2; X-Force #25; X-Men (1991) #25; Wolverine (1988) #75; Excalibur #71	816	25 Feb 2025	John Romita Jr. cover: 978-1302963507
X-Men: Fatal Attractions	1993-1994	Uncanny X-Men #298–305, 315, Annual #17; X-Factor #87–92; X-Men Unlimited #1–2; X-Force #25; X-Men (1991) #25; Wolverine (1988) #75; Excalibur #71	816	25 Feb 2025	Bob Larking DM cover: 978-1302963774
X-Men: Fatal Attractions	1993-1994	Uncanny X-Men #298–305, 315, Annual #17; X-Factor #87–92; X-Men Unlimited #1–2; X-Force #25; X-Men (1991) #25; Wolverine (1988) #75; Excalibur #71	816	25 Feb 2025	Greg Capullo DM cover: 978-1302963514

=== Heroes Reborn ===
Title	Years covered	Material collected	Pages	Released	ISBN
Heroes Reborn	1996-1997	Heroes Reborn #½; Captain America (vol. 2) #1–12; Avengers (vol. 2) #1–12; Fantastic Four (vol. 2) #1–12; Iron Man (vol. 2) #1–12; material from Incredible Hulk (vol. 2) #450	1,360	26 Jun 2019	Brett Booth & Tom McWeeney cover: 978-1302918040
Heroes Reborn	1996-1997	Heroes Reborn #½; Captain America (vol. 2) #1–12; Avengers (vol. 2) #1–12; Fantastic Four (vol. 2) #1–12; Iron Man (vol. 2) #1–12; material from Incredible Hulk (vol. 2) #450	1,360	16 Jun 2021	Brett Booth cover: 978-1302929718
Heroes Reborn	1996-1997	Heroes Reborn #½; Captain America (vol. 2) #1–12; Avengers (vol. 2) #1–12; Fantastic Four (vol. 2) #1–12; Iron Man (vol. 2) #1–12; material from Incredible Hulk (vol. 2) #450	1,360	16 Jun 2021	Jim Lee DM cover: 978-1302929725
Heroes Reborn: The Return	1998-2011	Heroes Reborn: The Return #1–4; Thor Annual 1999; Heroes Reborn: Doomsday, Ashema, Masters of Evil, Rebel, Remnants, Young Allies, Doom; Fantastic Four (1998) #25, 31; Doom #1–3; Doom: The Emperor Returns #1–3; Thunderbolts #51–52, 60–62, 64, 66, 68, 70, 72, 74; Exiles #81–82; Onslaught Reborn #1–5; Onslaught Unleashed #1–4; Marvel Spotlight: Heroes Reborn/Onslaught Reborn	1,136	9 Sep 2020	Brett Booth cover: 978-1302925178
Heroes Reborn: America's Mightiest Heroes	2021	Heroes Reborn (2021) #1–7; Heroes Return (2021) #1; Heroes Reborn: Hyperion & the Imperial Guard (2021) #1; Heroes Reborn: Peter Parker, the Amazing Shutterbug (2021) #1; Heroes Reborn: Magneto & the Mutant Force (2021) #1; Heroes Reborn: Young Squadron (2021) #1; Heroes Reborn: Siege Society (2021) #1; Heroes Reborn: Squadron Savage (2021) #1; Heroes Reborn: Marvel Double Action (2021) #1; Heroes Reborn: American Knights (2021) #1; Heroes Reborn: Night-Gwen (2021) #1; Heroes Reborn: Weapon X & Final Flight (2021) #1	560	1 Nov 2022	Ed McGuinness cover: 978-1302945190
Heroes Reborn: America's Mightiest Heroes	2021		560	1 Nov 2022	Carlos Pacheco DM cover: 978-1302945206

=== House of M ===
Title	Years covered	Material collected	Pages	Released	ISBN
House of M	2005-2006, 2009	House of M (2005) #1–8; Spider-Man: House of M (2005) #1–5; Secrets of the House of M (2005); Decimation: House of M - The Day After; House of M: Director's Cut (2005); House of M Sketchbook (2005), and more: Fantastic Four: House of M (2005) #1–3; Iron Man: House of M (2005) #1–3; New Thunderbolts (2004) #11; Black Panther (2005) #7; Uncanny X-Men (1981) #462–465; Wolverine (2003) #33–35; Captain America (2004) #10; Pulse (2004) #10; Cable & Deadpool (2004) #17; Incredible Hulk (2000) #83–87; New X-Men (2004) #16–19; Exiles (2001) #69–71; Mutopia X (2005) #1–5; Giant-Size Ms. Marvel (2006) #1; Pulse: House of M Special (2005); material from Hulk: Broken Worlds (2009) #1	1,368	10 Jan 2023	Olivier Coipel cover: 978-1302948221
House of M	2005-2006, 2009		1,368	10 Jan 2023	Esad Ribić DM cover: 978-1302948238
House of M Companion	2004-2015	Excalibur (2004) #8–14, New Avengers (2004) #16–20, House of M: Avengers (2007) #1–5, Civil War: House of M (2008) #1–5, House of M: Masters of Evil (2009) #1–4, What If? Spider-Man: House of M (2009), House of M (2015) #1–4, material from What If? House of M	800	9 Jul 2024	Olivier Coipel cover: 978-1302953768
House of M Companion	2004-2015	Excalibur (2004) #8–14, New Avengers (2004) #16–20, House of M: Avengers (2007) #1–5, Civil War: House of M (2008) #1–5, House of M: Masters of Evil (2009) #1–4, What If? Spider-Man: House of M (2009), House of M (2015) #1–4, material from What If? House of M	800	9 Jul 2024	Mike Deodato DM cover: 978-1302953775

=== Inferno ===
#	Title	Years covered	Material collected	Pages	Released	ISBN
1	X-Men: Inferno Prologue	1988	X-Factor #27–32, Annual #3; Uncanny X-Men #228–238; New Mutants #62–70, Annual #4; X-Men Annual #12; material from Marvel Age Annual #4 and Marvel Fanfare #40	824	7 Dec 2021	Marc Silvestri cover: 978-1302931360
1	X-Men: Inferno Prologue	1988	X-Factor #27–32, Annual #3; Uncanny X-Men #228–238; New Mutants #62–70, Annual #4; X-Men Annual #12; material from Marvel Age Annual #4 and Marvel Fanfare #40	824	7 Dec 2021	Arthur Adams DM cover: 978-1302931377
2	X-Men: Inferno	1988-1989	Uncanny X-Men #239–243; New Mutants #71–73; X-Factor #33–40, material from Annual #4; X-Terminators #1–4; Power Pack #40, 42–44; Avengers #298–300; Fantastic Four #322–324; Amazing Spider-Man #311–313; Spectacular Spider-Man #146–148; Web of Spider-Man #47–48; Daredevil #262–263, 265; Excalibur #6–7; Mutant Misadventures of Cloak and Dagger #4	1,240	17 Mar 2021	Marc Silvestri cover: 978-1302928544
2	X-Men: Inferno	1988-1989	Uncanny X-Men #239–243; New Mutants #71–73; X-Factor #33–40, material from Annual #4; X-Terminators #1–4; Power Pack #40, 42–44; Avengers #298–300; Fantastic Four #322–324; Amazing Spider-Man #311–313; Spectacular Spider-Man #146–148; Web of Spider-Man #47–48; Daredevil #262–263, 265; Excalibur #6–7; Mutant Misadventures of Cloak and Dagger #4	1,240	17 Mar 2021	Walter Simonson DM cover: 978-1302928551

=== Infinity ===
Title	Years covered	Material collected	Pages	Released	ISBN
The Thanos Wars: Infinity Origins	1973-1982	Iron Man (1968) #55, Captain Marvel (1968) #25–34, Marvel Feature (1971) #12, Avengers (1963) #125, Strange Tales (1951) #178–181, Warlock (1972) #9–15, Marvel Team-Up (1972) #55, Avengers Annual (1967) #7, Marvel Two-in-One Annual (1976) #2, Marvel Graphic Novel (1982) No. 1 – The Death of Captain Marvel, material from Daredevil (1964) #105 and Logan's Run (1977) #6	800	9 Apr 2019	Ron Lim cover: 978-1302915308
The Thanos Wars: Infinity Origins	1973-1982	Iron Man (1968) #55, Captain Marvel (1968) #25–34, Marvel Feature (1971) #12, Avengers (1963) #125, Strange Tales (1951) #178–181, Warlock (1972) #9–15, Marvel Team-Up (1972) #55, Avengers Annual (1967) #7, Marvel Two-in-One Annual (1976) #2, Marvel Graphic Novel (1982) No. 1 – The Death of Captain Marvel, material from Daredevil (1964) #105 and Logan's Run (1977) #6	800	9 Apr 2019	In-Hyuk Lee DM cover: 978-1302915315
Infinity Gauntlet	1990-1991	Silver Surfer (1987) #34–38, 40, 44–60; Thanos Quest #1–2; Infinity Gauntlet (1991) #1–6, Cloak and Dagger (1988) #18; Spider-Man (1990) #17; Incredible Hulk (vol. 2) #383–385; Doctor Strange, Sorcerer Supreme #31–36; Quasar #26–27; Sleepwalker #7	1,248	15 Jul 2014	George Perez cover: 978-0785154686
Infinity Gauntlet	1990-1991	Silver Surfer (1987) #34–38, 40, 44–60; Thanos Quest #1–2; Infinity Gauntlet (1991) #1–6, Cloak and Dagger (1988) #18; Spider-Man (1990) #17; Incredible Hulk (vol. 2) #383–385; Doctor Strange, Sorcerer Supreme #31–36; Quasar #26–27; Sleepwalker #7	1,248	15 Jul 2014	Jim Starlin DM cover: 978-0785154693
Infinity Gauntlet	1990-1991	Silver Surfer (1987) #34–38, 40, 44–60; Thanos Quest #1–2; Infinity Gauntlet (1991) #1–6, Cloak and Dagger (1988) #18; Spider-Man (1990) #17; Incredible Hulk (vol. 2) #383–385; Doctor Strange, Sorcerer Supreme #31–36; Quasar #26–27; Sleepwalker #7	1,248	28 Oct 2020	George Perez cover: 978-1302926380
Infinity Gauntlet	1990-1991	Silver Surfer (1987) #34–38, 40, 44–60; Thanos Quest #1–2; Infinity Gauntlet (1991) #1–6, Cloak and Dagger (1988) #18; Spider-Man (1990) #17; Incredible Hulk (vol. 2) #383–385; Doctor Strange, Sorcerer Supreme #31–36; Quasar #26–27; Sleepwalker #7	1,248	28 Oct 2020	Jim Starlin DM cover: 978-1302926397
Infinity War	1992	Infinity War #1–6; Fantastic Four (1961) #366–370; Spider-Man (1990) #24; Deathlok (1991) #16; Daredevil (1964) #310; Warlock and the Infinity Watch #7–10; Doctor Strange, Sorcerer Supreme #42–47; Silver Surfer (1987) #67–69; Wonder Man (1991) #13–15; Alpha Flight (1983) #110–112; Silver Sable and the Wild Pack #4–5; Guardians of the Galaxy (1990) #27–29; Quasar #37–40; New Warriors (1990) #27; Marc Spector: Moon Knight #41–44; Nomad (1992) #7; Sleepwalker #18; material from Captain America (1968) #408, Alpha Flight (1983) #109 and Marvel Comics Presents (1988) #108–112	1,352	16 Apr 2019	Ron Lim cover: 978-1302915964
Infinity Crusade	1993	Infinity Crusade #1–6; Warlock Chronicles #1–5; Warlock and the Infinity Watch #18–22; Thor #463–467; Iron Man #294–295; Avengers West Coast #96–97; Darkhawk #30–31; Cage #17; Alpha Flight #124–125, 127; Marc Spector: Moon Knight #57; Silver Surfer #83–85; Deathlok #28; material from Doctor Strange, Sorcerer Supreme #54–56, Alpha Flight #122–123, 126, Web of Spider-Man #104–106, Silver Sable and the Wild Pack #16–17 and Deathlok #29	1,200	12 Jan 2021	Ron Lim cover: 978-1302923495
Infinity Crusade	1993	Infinity Crusade #1–6; Warlock Chronicles #1–5; Warlock and the Infinity Watch #18–22; Thor #463–467; Iron Man #294–295; Avengers West Coast #96–97; Darkhawk #30–31; Cage #17; Alpha Flight #124–125, 127; Marc Spector: Moon Knight #57; Silver Surfer #83–85; Deathlok #28; material from Doctor Strange, Sorcerer Supreme #54–56, Alpha Flight #122–123, 126, Web of Spider-Man #104–106, Silver Sable and the Wild Pack #16–17 and Deathlok #29	1,200	12 Jan 2021	Stephen Platt DM cover: 978-1302927165
Thanos: The Infinity Saga	2014-2019	Thanos Annual (2014) #1, Thanos: The Infinity Revelation (2014), Thanos vs. Hulk (2014) #1–4, Thanos: The Infinity Relativity (2015), Infinity Entity (2016) #1–4, Thanos: The Infinity Finale (2016), Guardians of the Galaxy: Mother Entropy (2017) #1–5, Thanos: The Infinity Siblings (2018), Thanos: The Infinity Conflict (2018), Thanos: The Infinity Ending (2019)	984	24 Nov 2020	Thanos Face cover: 978-1302926366
Thanos: The Infinity Saga	2014-2019	Thanos Annual (2014) #1, Thanos: The Infinity Revelation (2014), Thanos vs. Hulk (2014) #1–4, Thanos: The Infinity Relativity (2015), Infinity Entity (2016) #1–4, Thanos: The Infinity Finale (2016), Guardians of the Galaxy: Mother Entropy (2017) #1–5, Thanos: The Infinity Siblings (2018), Thanos: The Infinity Conflict (2018), Thanos: The Infinity Ending (2019)	984	24 Nov 2020	Thanos Fist DM cover: 978-1302926373
Infinity by Starlin and Hickman	1991-2013	Infinity Gauntlet (1991) #1–6, Infinity #1–6, New Avengers (vol. 3) #7–12, Avengers (vol. 5) #14–23	848	2 Apr 2019	George Perez cover: 978-1302915650

=== King in Black ===
Title	Years covered	Material collected	Pages	Released	ISBN
King in Black	2020-2021	King in Black (2020) #1–5; King in Black: Planet of the Symbiotes (2021) #1–3; King in Black: Spider-Man (2021) #1; Venom (2018) #31–34; King in Black: The Immortal Hulk (2020) #1; King in Black: Iron Man/Doctor Doom (2020) #1; King in Black: Black Knight (2021) #1; King in Black: Marauders (2021) #1; King in Black: Black Panther (2021) #1; King in Black: Captain America (2021) #1; King in Black: Wiccan and Hulkling (2021) #1; King in Black: Scream (2021) #1; King in Black: Ghost Rider (2021) #1; King in Black: Gwenom vs. Carnage (2021) #1–3; King in Black: Namor (2021) #1–5; King in Black: Return of the Valkyries (2021) #1–4; King in Black: Thunderbolts (2021) #1–3; Symbiote Spider-Man: King in Black (2020) #1–5; Black Cat (2020) #1–3; Daredevil (2019) #26–27; Deadpool (2019) #10; Fantastic Four (2018) #29–30; Guardians of the Galaxy (2020) #10; Miles Morales: Spider-Man (2018) #23; S.W.O.R.D. (2020) #2–4; Savage Avengers (2019) #17–19; Spider-Woman (2020) #7–8; Union (2020) #1–2; King in Black Handbook (2021)	1,568	6 Dec 2022	Ryan Stegman Fall cover: 978-1302946432
King in Black	2020-2021		1,568	6 Dec 2022	Ryan Stegman Dawn DM cover: 978-1302946449
King in Black	2020-2021		1,568	18 Aug 2026	Ryan Stegman Fall cover: 978-1302970710
King in Black	2020-2021		1,568	18 Aug 2026	Ryan Stegman Dawn DM cover: TBC
Jump to: Venom

=== Mutant Massacre ===
#	Title	Years covered	Material collected	Pages	Released	ISBN
1	X-Men: Mutant Massacre Prelude	1985-1986	Uncanny X-Men #194–209, Annual #9–10; New Mutants Special Edition #1; New Mutants Annual #2; Nightcrawler (1985) #1–4; Longshot (1985) #1–6; Avengers #263; Fantastic Four #286; X-Factor #1–8, Annual #1; Iron Man Annual #8; Amazing Spider-Man #282; material from Marvel Fanfare #33 and Classic X-Men #8, 43	1,496	6 Aug 2024	John Romita Jr. cover: 978-1302959739
1	X-Men: Mutant Massacre Prelude	1985-1986	Uncanny X-Men #194–209, Annual #9–10; New Mutants Special Edition #1; New Mutants Annual #2; Nightcrawler (1985) #1–4; Longshot (1985) #1–6; Avengers #263; Fantastic Four #286; X-Factor #1–8, Annual #1; Iron Man Annual #8; Amazing Spider-Man #282; material from Marvel Fanfare #33 and Classic X-Men #8, 43	1,496	6 Aug 2024	Bob Layton DM cover: 978-1302959746
2	X-Men: Mutant Massacre	1986-1987	Uncanny X-Men #210–219, Annual #11; X-Factor #9–17, Annual #2; New Mutants #46; Thor #373–374, 377–378; Power Pack #27; Daredevil #238; Fantastic Four vs. X-Men #1–4; The X-Men vs. The Avengers #1–4	952	20 Nov 2018	John Romita Jr. cover: 1302914243
2	X-Men: Mutant Massacre	1986-1987	Uncanny X-Men #210–219, Annual #11; X-Factor #9–17, Annual #2; New Mutants #46; Thor #373–374, 377–378; Power Pack #27; Daredevil #238; Fantastic Four vs. X-Men #1–4; The X-Men vs. The Avengers #1–4	952	12 Jan 2022	John Romita Jr. cover: 978-1302931599
2	X-Men: Mutant Massacre	1986-1987	Uncanny X-Men #210–219, Annual #11; X-Factor #9–17, Annual #2; New Mutants #46; Thor #373–374, 377–378; Power Pack #27; Daredevil #238; Fantastic Four vs. X-Men #1–4; The X-Men vs. The Avengers #1–4	952	12 Jan 2022	Alan Davis DM cover: 978-1302931605

=== Onslaught ===
#	Title	Years covered	Material collected	Pages	Released	ISBN
1	X-Men: Road to Onslaught Vol. 1	1995	X-Men Prime #1, Uncanny X-Men #322–328, Annual '95, X-Men (1991) #42–47, Annual '95, X-Men Unlimited #8–9, Sabretooth (1996) #1, Wolverine/Gambit: Victims #1–4, Starjammers #1–4	912	3 Dec 2024	Joe Madureira cover: 978-1302959500
1	X-Men: Road to Onslaught Vol. 1	1995	X-Men Prime #1, Uncanny X-Men #322–328, Annual '95, X-Men (1991) #42–47, Annual '95, X-Men Unlimited #8–9, Sabretooth (1996) #1, Wolverine/Gambit: Victims #1–4, Starjammers #1–4	912	3 Dec 2024	Andy Kubert DM cover: 978-1302959517
2	X-Men: Road to Onslaught Vol. 2	1996	Uncanny X-Men #329–332, X-Men (1991) #48–52; X-Men Unlimited #10; Archangel #1; X-Men Vs. The Brood #1-2; X-Men & ClanDestine #1-2; Storm (1996) #1-4; Further Adventures of Cyclops & Phoenix #1-4; Rise of Apocalypse #1-4; Wolverine (vol. 2) #101; Black Knight: Exodus #1; Fantastic Four (1961) #19; Xavier Institute Alumni Yearbook	984	3 Mar 2026	Steve Geiger cover: 978-1302965488
2	X-Men: Road to Onslaught Vol. 2	1996	Uncanny X-Men #329–332, X-Men (1991) #48–52; X-Men Unlimited #10; Archangel #1; X-Men Vs. The Brood #1-2; X-Men & ClanDestine #1-2; Storm (1996) #1-4; Further Adventures of Cyclops & Phoenix #1-4; Rise of Apocalypse #1-4; Wolverine (vol. 2) #101; Black Knight: Exodus #1; Fantastic Four (1961) #19; Xavier Institute Alumni Yearbook	984	3 Mar 2026	Sam Liu DM cover: 978-1302965495
3	X-Men / Avengers: Onslaught	1996	Cable #32–36; Uncanny X-Men #333–337; X-Force #55, 57–58; X-Man #15–19; X-Men (1991) #53–57, Annual '96; X-Men Unlimited #11; Onslaught: X-Men, Marvel Universe, Epilogue; Avengers #401–402; Fantastic Four #415; Incredible Hulk (vol. 2) #444–445; Wolverine (vol. 2) #104–105; X-Factor #125–126; Amazing Spider-Man #415; Green Goblin #12; Spider-Man #72; Iron Man #332; Punisher #11; Thor #502; X-Men: Road to Onslaught #1; material from Excalibur #100 and Fantastic Four #416	1,296	14 Jul 2015	Andy Kubert cover: 978-0785192626
3	X-Men / Avengers: Onslaught	1996	Cable #32–36; Uncanny X-Men #333–337; X-Force #55, 57–58; X-Man #15–19; X-Men (1991) #53–57, Annual '96; X-Men Unlimited #11; Onslaught: X-Men, Marvel Universe, Epilogue; Avengers #401–402; Fantastic Four #415; Incredible Hulk (vol. 2) #444–445; Wolverine (vol. 2) #104–105; X-Factor #125–126; Amazing Spider-Man #415; Green Goblin #12; Spider-Man #72; Iron Man #332; Punisher #11; Thor #502; X-Men: Road to Onslaught #1; material from Excalibur #100 and Fantastic Four #416	1,296	8 Mar 2022	Alan Davis Team cover: 978-1302931612
3	X-Men / Avengers: Onslaught	1996	Cable #32–36; Uncanny X-Men #333–337; X-Force #55, 57–58; X-Man #15–19; X-Men (1991) #53–57, Annual '96; X-Men Unlimited #11; Onslaught: X-Men, Marvel Universe, Epilogue; Avengers #401–402; Fantastic Four #415; Incredible Hulk (vol. 2) #444–445; Wolverine (vol. 2) #104–105; X-Factor #125–126; Amazing Spider-Man #415; Green Goblin #12; Spider-Man #72; Iron Man #332; Punisher #11; Thor #502; X-Men: Road to Onslaught #1; material from Excalibur #100 and Fantastic Four #416	1,296	8 Mar 2022	Alan Davis Magneto DM cover: 978-1302931629
4	X-Men: Onslaught Aftermath	1996-1997	Uncanny X-Men #338–340, Annual '96–'97; X-Men (1991) #58–61, Annual '97; X-Men Unlimited #12–15; Magneto (1996) #1–4; XSE #1–4; X-Factor #130; Juggernaut (1997) #1; Beast #1–3; material from Marvel Holiday Special (1996) #1	848	24 Jun 2025	Adam Kubert cover: 978-1302964191
4	X-Men: Onslaught Aftermath	1996-1997	Uncanny X-Men #338–340, Annual '96–'97; X-Men (1991) #58–61, Annual '97; X-Men Unlimited #12–15; Magneto (1996) #1–4; XSE #1–4; X-Factor #130; Juggernaut (1997) #1; Beast #1–3; material from Marvel Holiday Special (1996) #1	848	24 Jun 2025	Steve Epting wraparound DM cover: 978-1302964207

=== Secret Invasion ===
Title	Years covered	Material collected	Pages	Released	ISBN
Secret Invasion by Brian Michael Bendis	2006-2009	Secret Invasion #1–8; Secret Invasion: Prologue; New Avengers (2004) #31–32, 39–49; Mighty Avengers (2007) #7, 12–20; New Avengers: Illuminati (2006) #1, 5	952	7 Aug 2018	Gabriele Dell'Otto cover: 978-1302912154

=== Secret War ===
Title	Years covered	Material collected	Pages	Released	ISBN
Secret War by Brian Michael Bendis	2004-2005	Secret War (2004) #1-5, Pulse (2004) #6-9, Secret War: From the Files of Nick Fury (2005)	368	1 Apr 2025	Classic costume cover: 978-1302963828
Secret War by Brian Michael Bendis	2004-2005	Secret War (2004) #1-5, Pulse (2004) #6-9, Secret War: From the Files of Nick Fury (2005)	368	1 Apr 2025	Secret War costume DM cover: 978-1302963835

=== Secret Wars (1984) ===
Title	Years covered	Material collected	Pages	Released	ISBN
Secret Wars	1984, 1987, 1989, 1998, 2004	Marvel Super Heroes Secret Wars #1–12; Thor (1966) #383; She-Hulk (2004) #10; What If? (1989) #4, 114	496	21 Jan 2009	Mike Zeck cover: 978-0785131106
Secret Wars	1984, 1987, 1989, 1998, 2004	Marvel Super Heroes Secret Wars #1–12; Thor (1966) #383; She-Hulk (2004) #10; What If? (1989) #4, 114	496	21 Jan 2009	Alex Ross DM cover: 978-0785132936
Secret Wars	1984, 1987, 1989, 1998, 2004	Marvel Super Heroes Secret Wars #1–12; Thor (1966) #383; She-Hulk (2004) #10; What If? (1989) #4, 114	496	10 Jan 2023	Mike Zeck cover: 978-1302945596
Secret Wars	1984, 1987, 1989, 1998, 2004	Marvel Super Heroes Secret Wars #1–12; Thor (1966) #383; She-Hulk (2004) #10; What If? (1989) #4, 114	496	10 Jan 2023	Alex Ross DM cover: 978-1302945602
Secret Wars II	1985-1988	Secret Wars II #1–9; New Mutants #30, 36–37; Captain America #308; Uncanny X-Men #196, 202–203; Iron Man #197; Fantastic Four #282, 285, 288, 316–319; Web of Spider-Man #6; The Amazing Spider-Man #268, 273–274; Daredevil #223; The Incredible Hulk (vol. 2) #312; The Avengers #260–261, 265–266; Dazzler #40; Alpha Flight #28; The Thing #30; Doctor Strange #74; Cloak and Dagger #4; Power Pack #18; Thor #363; Power Man and Iron Fist #121; Peter Parker, the Spectacular Spider-Man #111; Defenders #152; Deadpool Team-Up #1; Quasar #8	1,184	6 May 2009	Ed McGuinness & Mark Farmer cover: 978-0785131113
Secret Wars II	1985-1988		1,184	6 May 2009	John Byrne DM cover: 978-0785136583

=== Secret Wars (2015) ===
#	Title	Years covered	Material collected	Pages	Released	ISBN
	Secret Wars by Jonathan Hickman	2014-2016	Avengers (2012) #35–44, New Avengers (2013) #24–33, FCBD 2015 (Secret Wars) #0 (A-story), Secret Wars (2015) #1–9	872	17 Dec 2024	Alex Ross Mr Fantastic cover: 978-1302959777
	Secret Wars by Jonathan Hickman	2014-2016	Avengers (2012) #35–44, New Avengers (2013) #24–33, FCBD 2015 (Secret Wars) #0 (A-story), Secret Wars (2015) #1–9	872	17 Dec 2024	Alex Ross Battle DM cover: 978-1302960261
	Secret Wars by Jonathan Hickman	2014-2016	Avengers (2012) #35–44, New Avengers (2013) #24–33, FCBD 2015 (Secret Wars) #0 (A-story), Secret Wars (2015) #1–9	872	17 Dec 2024	Jim Cheung DM cover: 978-1302959784
1	Secret Wars: Battleworld Vol. 1	2015	1602: Witch Hunter Angela (2015) #1–4; 1872 (2015) #1–4; A-Force (2015) #1–5; Age of Apocalypse (2015) #1–5; Age of Ultron vs. Marvel Zombies (2015) #1–4; Amazing Spider-Man: Renew Your Vows (2015) #1–5; Armor Wars (2015) #1–5, 1/2; Captain Britain and the Mighty Defenders (2015) #1–2; Captain Marvel and the Carol Corps (2015) #1–4; Civil War (2015) #1–5; Deadpool's Secret Secret Wars (2015) #1–4; E is for Extinction (2015) #1–4	1,288	28 Jan 2025	Jim Cheung cover: 978-1302959685
1	Secret Wars: Battleworld Vol. 1	2015	1602: Witch Hunter Angela (2015) #1–4; 1872 (2015) #1–4; A-Force (2015) #1–5; Age of Apocalypse (2015) #1–5; Age of Ultron vs. Marvel Zombies (2015) #1–4; Amazing Spider-Man: Renew Your Vows (2015) #1–5; Armor Wars (2015) #1–5, 1/2; Captain Britain and the Mighty Defenders (2015) #1–2; Captain Marvel and the Carol Corps (2015) #1–4; Civil War (2015) #1–5; Deadpool's Secret Secret Wars (2015) #1–4; E is for Extinction (2015) #1–4	1,288	28 Jan 2025	Humberto Ramos X-Men DM cover: 978-1302959692
2	Secret Wars: Battleworld Vol. 2	2015	Future Imperfect #1-5; Ghost Racers #1-4; Giant-Sized Little Marvel: AvX #1-4; Guardians of Knowhere #1-4; Hail Hydra #1-4; Hank Johnson: Agent of Hydra; House of M (2015) #1-4; Howard the Human; Inferno (2015) #1-5; Infinity Gauntlet (2015) #1-5; Inhumans: Attilian Rising #1-5; Korvac Saga #1-4; M.O.D.O.K.: Assassin #1-5	1,176	30 Dec 2025	Simone Bianchi cover: 978-1302965525
2	Secret Wars: Battleworld Vol. 2	2015	Future Imperfect #1-5; Ghost Racers #1-4; Giant-Sized Little Marvel: AvX #1-4; Guardians of Knowhere #1-4; Hail Hydra #1-4; Hank Johnson: Agent of Hydra; House of M (2015) #1-4; Howard the Human; Inferno (2015) #1-5; Infinity Gauntlet (2015) #1-5; Inhumans: Attilian Rising #1-5; Korvac Saga #1-4; M.O.D.O.K.: Assassin #1-5	1,176	30 Dec 2025	Esad Ribić DM cover: 978-1302965532
3	Secret Wars: Battleworld Vol. 3	2015	Marvel Zombies (2015) #1-4; Master of Kung Fu (2015) #1-4; Mrs. Deadpool and the Howling Commandos (2015) #1-4; Old Man Logan (2015) #1-5; Planet Hulk (2015) #1-5; Red Skull (2015) #1-3; Runaways (2015) #1-4; Secret Wars 2099 (2015) #1-5; Secret Wars: Agents of Atlas (2015); Secret Wars: Battleworld (2015) #1-4; Secret Wars Journal (2015) #1-5; Secret Wars: Secret Love (2015); Secret Wars, Too (2015); Siege (2015) #1-4	1,200	24 Feb 2026	Paco Medina cover: 978-1302968410
3	Secret Wars: Battleworld Vol. 3	2015	Marvel Zombies (2015) #1-4; Master of Kung Fu (2015) #1-4; Mrs. Deadpool and the Howling Commandos (2015) #1-4; Old Man Logan (2015) #1-5; Planet Hulk (2015) #1-5; Red Skull (2015) #1-3; Runaways (2015) #1-4; Secret Wars 2099 (2015) #1-5; Secret Wars: Agents of Atlas (2015); Secret Wars: Battleworld (2015) #1-4; Secret Wars Journal (2015) #1-5; Secret Wars: Secret Love (2015); Secret Wars, Too (2015); Siege (2015) #1-4	1,200	24 Feb 2026	Andrea Sorrentino DM cover: 978-1302968427

=== Spider-Verse / Spider-Geddon ===
Title	Years covered	Material collected	Pages	Released	ISBN
Spider-Verse / Spider-Geddon	2014-2018	Edge of Spider-Verse (2014) #1–5; Spider-Verse (2014) #1–2; Superior Spider-Man (2013) #32–33; Amazing Spider-Man (vol. 3) #7–15; Spider-Man 2099 (2014) #5–8; Scarlet Spiders (2014) #1–3; Spider-Woman (2014) #1–4; Spider-Verse Team-Up (2014) #1–3; material from FCBD 2014: Guardians of the Galaxy; Edge of Spider-Geddon (2018) #1–4; Spider-Geddon (2018) #0–5; Superior Octopus (2018) #1; Spider-Force (2018) #1–3; Spider-Girls (2018) #1–3; Peter Parker, the Spectacular Spider-Man (2017) #311–313; Spider-Gwen: Ghost-Spider (2018) #1–4; Vault of Spiders (2018) #1–2; Spider-Geddon: Spider-Man Noir Video Comic (2018); Spider-Geddon: Spider-Gwen - Ghost-Spider Video Comic (2018); Spider-Geddon: Spider-Man Video Comic (2018); Spider-Geddon Handbook (2018)	1,440	21 Feb 2023	Olivier Coipel cover: 978-1302947422
Spider-Verse / Spider-Geddon	2014-2018		1,440	21 Feb 2023	Giuseppe Camuncoli DM cover: 978-1302947439
Spider-Verse / Spider-Geddon	2014-2018		1,440	25 Aug 2026	Olivier Coipel cover: 978-1302970734
Spider-Verse / Spider-Geddon	2014-2018		1,440	25 Aug 2026	Giuseppe Camuncoli DM cover: TBC

=== Venom War ===
Title	Years covered	Material collected	Pages	Released	ISBN
Venom War	2024-2025	Venom War #1-5; Venom (vol. 5) #35-39; Venom War: Spider-Man #1-4; Venom War: Lethal Protectors #1-3; Venom War: Fantastic Four; Venom War: It's Jeff; Venom War: Wolverine #1-3; Venom War: Deadpool #1-3; Venom War: Carnage #1-3; Venom War: Zombiotes #1-3; Venom War: Venomous #1-3; Black Widow: Venomous; Venom War: Daredevil	888	8 Dec 2026	Iban Coello cover: 978-1302966850
Venom War	2024-2025	Venom War #1-5; Venom (vol. 5) #35-39; Venom War: Spider-Man #1-4; Venom War: Lethal Protectors #1-3; Venom War: Fantastic Four; Venom War: It's Jeff; Venom War: Wolverine #1-3; Venom War: Deadpool #1-3; Venom War: Carnage #1-3; Venom War: Zombiotes #1-3; Venom War: Venomous #1-3; Black Widow: Venomous; Venom War: Daredevil	888	8 Dec 2026	Carlos Gómez DM cover: 978-1302966867

=== War of Kings ===
#	Title	Years covered	Material collected	Pages	Released	ISBN
Jump to: Annihilation
1	War of Kings Prelude: Road to War of Kings	2005-2009	Son of M #1–6; X-Men: Deadly Genesis #1–6; Silent War #1–6; Secret Invasion: Inhumans #1–4; Nova (2007) #13–22; Guardians of the Galaxy (2008) #1–12; Nova: The Origin of Richard Rider; War of Kings Saga	1,192	20 Apr 2017	Stjepan Sejic cover: 978-1302904463
2	War of Kings	2006-2009	Uncanny X-Men #475–486; X-Men: Emperor Vulcan #1–5; Secret Invasion: War of Kings; X-Men: Kingbreaker #1–4; War of Kings: Darkhawk #1–2; War of Kings: Warriors #1–2; War of Kings #1–6; War of Kings: Ascension #1–4; War of Kings: Savage World of Sakaar; Nova (2007) #23–28; Guardians of the Galaxy (2008) #13–19; War of Kings: Who Will Rule?; Marvel Spotlight: War of Kings	1,304	8 Nov 2016	David Yardin cover: 978-1302902254
2	War of Kings	2006-2009	Uncanny X-Men #475–486; X-Men: Emperor Vulcan #1–5; Secret Invasion: War of Kings; X-Men: Kingbreaker #1–4; War of Kings: Darkhawk #1–2; War of Kings: Warriors #1–2; War of Kings #1–6; War of Kings: Ascension #1–4; War of Kings: Savage World of Sakaar; Nova (2007) #23–28; Guardians of the Galaxy (2008) #13–19; War of Kings: Who Will Rule?; Marvel Spotlight: War of Kings	1,304	11 Apr 2023	David Yardin cover: 978-1302945671
2	War of Kings	2006-2009	Uncanny X-Men #475–486; X-Men: Emperor Vulcan #1–5; Secret Invasion: War of Kings; X-Men: Kingbreaker #1–4; War of Kings: Darkhawk #1–2; War of Kings: Warriors #1–2; War of Kings #1–6; War of Kings: Ascension #1–4; War of Kings: Savage World of Sakaar; Nova (2007) #23–28; Guardians of the Galaxy (2008) #13–19; War of Kings: Who Will Rule?; Marvel Spotlight: War of Kings	1,304	11 Apr 2023	Brandon Peterson DM cover: 978-1302945688
3	War of Kings Aftermath: Realm of Kings	2009-2011	Realm of Kings #1; Realm of Kings: Inhumans #1–5; Realm of Kings: Imperial Guard #1–5; Realm of Kings: Son of Hulk #1–4; Nova (2007) #29–36; Guardians of the Galaxy (2008) #20–25; Thanos Imperative #1–6, Ignition, Devastation; Annihilators #1–4; Annihilators: Earthfall #1–4; Thanos Sourcebook; material from I Am An Avenger #3	1,248	14 Feb 2017	Alex Garner cover: 978-1302904470

=== War of the Realms ===
Title	Years covered	Material collected	Pages	Released	ISBN
The War of the Realms	2019	War of the Realms #1–6, Omega #1; War of the Realms: War Scrolls #1–3; War of the Realms Strikeforce: The Land of the Giants #1, The Dark Elf Realm #1, War Avengers #1; Giant-Man (2019) #1–3; War of the Realms: Journey into Mystery #1–5; Spider-Man & the League of Realms #1–3; War of the Realms: The Punisher #1-3; War of the Realms: Uncanny X-Men #1–3; War of the Realms: New Agents of Atlas #1–4; Asgardians of the Galaxy #8–10; Tony Stark: Iron Man (2018) #12–13; Venom (2018) #13–15; Thor (2018) #8–16; Avengers (2018) #18–20; Captain Marvel (2019) #6–7; Champions (2019) #5–6; Deadpool (2018) #13–14; Fantastic Four (2018) #10; Moon Girl and Devil Dinosaur (2016) #43; Superior Spider-Man (2019) #7–8; The Unbeatable Squirrel Girl (2015) #43–46	1,576	14 Oct 2020	Russell Dauterman cover: 978-1302926410
The War of the Realms	2019		1,576	14 Oct 2020	Art Adams DM cover: 978-1302926427
The War of the Realms	2019		1,576	12 Apr 2022	Russell Dauterman cover: 978-1302934019
The War of the Realms	2019		1,576	12 Apr 2022	Art Adams DM cover: 978-1302934002

=== X-Tinction Agenda ===
Title	Years covered	Material collected	Pages	Released	ISBN
X-Men: X-Tinction Agenda	1990-1991	Uncanny X-Men #270–272, Annual #14–15; New Mutants #95–97; X-Factor #60–62; X-Men: Spotlight on Starjammers #1–2; material from Fantastic Four Annual #23, New Mutants Annual #6–7, X-Factor Annual #5–6, New Warriors Annual #1, Marvel Comics Presents #10–17, 24–32, 41, 43, 48–49, Marvel Super-Heroes #2, 6–8, Marvel Holiday Special #1, Marvel Tales #262	984	29 Oct 2024	Jim Lee Final Strike cover: 978-1302960117
X-Men: X-Tinction Agenda	1990-1991	Uncanny X-Men #270–272, Annual #14–15; New Mutants #95–97; X-Factor #60–62; X-Men: Spotlight on Starjammers #1–2; material from Fantastic Four Annual #23, New Mutants Annual #6–7, X-Factor Annual #5–6, New Warriors Annual #1, Marvel Comics Presents #10–17, 24–32, 41, 43, 48–49, Marvel Super-Heroes #2, 6–8, Marvel Holiday Special #1, Marvel Tales #262	984	29 Oct 2024	Jim Lee Wanted DM cover: 978-1302960124

== Anthology Omnibuses ==
The following omnibuses either collect Anthology series not necessarily following one ongoing story, or collect various comics that share a unifying theme.

In 2014, the company used the format to help celebrate its 75th anniversary, by allowing fans to vote for the best comics be included in a 1,000-page omnibus. The top choice was the Spider-Man story The Death of Gwen Stacy, followed by Civil War (represented by the epilogue story The Death of Captain America), then Spider-Man: Kraven's Last Hunt

#	Title	Years covered	Material collected	Pages	Released	ISBN
	Adventure Into Fear	1970-1975	Adventure into Fear (1970) #1–31	816	9 Jul 2020	Jack Kirby cover: 978-1302925123
	Amazing Fantasy	1961-1962	Amazing Adventures #1–6; Amazing Adult Fantasy #7–14; Amazing Fantasy #15	416	5 Sep 2007	Steve Ditko cover: 978-0785124580
	Amazing Fantasy	1961-1962	Amazing Adventures #1–6; Amazing Adult Fantasy #7–14; Amazing Fantasy #15	416	5 Sep 2007	Jack Kirby DM cover: 978-0785128953
	Amazing Fantasy	1961-1962	Amazing Adventures #1–6; Amazing Adult Fantasy #7–14; Amazing Fantasy #15	448	24 Jun 2020	Steve Ditko cover: 978-1302922702
	Amazing Fantasy	1961-1962	Amazing Adventures #1–6; Amazing Adult Fantasy #7–14; Amazing Fantasy #15	448	24 Jun 2020	Daniel Brereton DM cover: 978-1302924799
	Giant-Size Marvel	1974-1975	Giant-Size Super-Stars (1974) #1; Giant-Size Fantastic Four (1974) #2–5; Giant-Size Super-Heroes Featuring Spider-Man (1974) #1; Giant-Size Spider-Man (1974) #1, 4–5; Giant-Size Chillers Featuring the Curse of Dracula (1974) #1; Giant-Size Dracula (1974) #2–5; Giant-Size Creatures Featuring Werewolf (1974) #1; Giant-Size Werewolf (1974) #2–5; Giant-Size Defenders (1974) #1–5; Giant-Size Avengers (1974) #1–4; Giant-Size Man-Thing (1974) #1–5; Giant-Size Chillers (1975) #1–3; Giant-Size Super-Villain Team-Up (1975) #1–2; Giant-Size X-Men (1975) #1; Giant-Size Invaders (1975) #1–2	1,272	27 May 2025	Dave Cockrum X-Men cover: 978-1302963880
	Giant-Size Marvel	1974-1975		1,272	27 May 2025	Gil Kane Dr. Doom DM cover: 978-1302964580
	Giant-Size Marvel	1974-1975		1,272	27 May 2025	John Romita Sr. Dracula DM cover: 978-1302963897
1	Golden Age Marvel Comics Vol. 1	1939-1940	Marvel Comics #1; Marvel Mystery Comics #2–12	848	23 Sep 2009	Jelena Kevic Djurdjevic cover: 978-0785135708
1	Golden Age Marvel Comics Vol. 1	1939-1940	Marvel Comics #1; Marvel Mystery Comics #2–12	848	23 Sep 2009	Frank R. Paul DM cover: 978-0785141594
1	Golden Age Marvel Comics Vol. 1	1939-1940	Marvel Comics #1; Marvel Mystery Comics #2–12	848	7 Aug 2019	Frank R. Paul cover: 978-1302918972
2	Golden Age Marvel Comics Vol. 2	1940-1941	Marvel Mystery Comics #13–24	832	23 Sep 2020	Kaare Kyle Andrews cover: 978-1302922047
2	Golden Age Marvel Comics Vol. 2	1940-1941	Marvel Mystery Comics #13–24	832	23 Sep 2020	Alex Schomburg DM cover: 978-1302922054
	Marvel 75th Anniversary	1941-2013	Fantastic Four (1961) #1, 48–50, 285; Hulk (1962) #1, and more: Avengers (1963) #1, 57; Amazing Spider-Man (vol. 1) #31–33, 50, 121–122; Incredible Hulk (1968) #181; Giant-Size X-Men #1; X-Men (1963) #141; Uncanny X-Men (1981) #142; Daredevil (1964) #181; Marvel Graphic Novel No. 1 – The Death of Captain Marvel and No. 5 – X-Men: God Loves, Man Kills; Thor (1966) #337; Marvels #1; X-Men Alpha; Thunderbolts (1997) #1; Amazing Spider-Man (1999) #36; The Ultimates (2002) #1; Captain America (2005) #25; Hawkeye (2012) #11; material from Captain America Comics (1941) #1, Amazing Fantasy (1962) #15 and Amazing Spider-Man (vol. 1) #248, 700	1,000	18 Nov 2014	978-0785191988
	Marvel Classics Comics	1977-1978	Marvel Classics Comics #13–36	1,264	30 Sep 2020	John Buscema cover: 978-1302925260
1	Marvel Fanfare Vol. 1	1982-1985	Marvel Fanfare (1982) #1–19	736	13 May 2025	Michael Golden cover: 978-1302962272
1	Marvel Fanfare Vol. 1	1982-1985	Marvel Fanfare (1982) #1–19	736	13 May 2025	Frank Miller DM cover: 978-1302962289
2	Marvel Fanfare Vol. 2	1985-1988	Marvel Fanfare (1982) #20-40	784	3 Feb 2026	Jim Starlin cover: 978-1302962654
2	Marvel Fanfare Vol. 2	1985-1988	Marvel Fanfare (1982) #20-40	784	3 Feb 2026	Arthur Adams DM cover: 978-1302962661
3	Marvel Fanfare Vol. 3	1988-1992	Marvel Fanfare (1982) #41-60	792	25 Aug 2026	Dave Gibbons cover: 978-1302968465
3	Marvel Fanfare Vol. 3	1988-1992	Marvel Fanfare (1982) #41-60	792	25 Aug 2026	Walter Simonson DM cover: 978-1302968472
	Marvel Firsts: The 1990s	1990-1999	Ghost Rider (1990) #1, Deathlok (1990) #1, New Warriors (1990) #1, Foolkiller (1990) #1, and more: Darkhawk #1, Sleepwalker #1, X-Force (1991) #1, X-Factor (1986) #71, Warlock and the Infinity Watch #2, Death's Head II (1992) #1, Silver Sable and the Wild Pack #1, Terror Inc. (1992) #1, Night Thrasher: Four Control #1, Darkhold: Pages from the Book of Sins #1, Nightstalkers #1, Spider-Man 2099 (1992) #1, Venom: Lethal Protector #1, Cable (1993) #1, Deadpool: The Circle Chase #1, Thunderstrike (1993) #1, Gambit (1993) #1, War Machine (1994) #1, Blackwulf #1, Force Works #1, Blade the Vampire Hunter (1994) #1, Generation X: San Diego Preview, Fantastic Force (1994) #1, Web of Spider-Man (1985) #118, Bishop #1, X-Man #1, Elektra: Root of Evil #1, Green Goblin #1, Captain Marvel (1995) #1, Heroes for Hire (1997) #1, Maverick #1, Quicksilver #1, Spider-Girl (1998) #1, Slingers #0, Spider-Woman (1999) #1, Deathlok (1999) #1; Warlock (1999) #1; material from Captain America Annual #9, Web of Spider-Man (1985) #100, Marvel Comics Presents (1988) #147, 158, and Tales of the Marvel Universe	1,288	18 Aug 2015	978-0785198161
	Marvel Horror	1961-1982	Strange Tales (1951) #169–174, 176–177; Supernatural Thrillers #5, 7–15, and more: Astonishing Tales (1970) #21–24, Dead of Night #11; Marvel Spotlight (1971) #26; Marvel Chillers #1–2; Marvel Team-Up (1972) #24; Werewolf by Night (1972) #39–41; Marvel Two-in-One (1974) #11, 18, 33, 41, 95; Doctor Strange (1974) #48; Incredible Hulk (1968) #244; Fantastic Four (1961) #222–223; Avengers (1963) #185–187; material from Tales of the Zombie (1973) #1–10, Haunt of Horror (1974) #2–5, Monsters Unleashed (1973) #11, Bizarre Adventures #33, Menace #5, Moon Knight (1980) #21, Tales of Suspense (1959) #14, 20 and Strange Tales (1951) #74, 89	1,328	17 Sep 2019	John Romita Sr cover: 978-1302919535
	Marvel Horror Lives Again!	1961-1981	The Tomb of Dracula (1972) #10, 67; Adventure into Fear #24; Marvel Preview #3, and more: Incredible Hulk (1968) #162, 180–181, 272; X-Men (1963) #139–140; Marvel Spotlight (1971) #24; Marvel Premiere #27; Marvel Team-up (1972) #80–81; Giant-Size Chillers Featuring the Curse of Dracula #1; X-Men Annual (1970) #6; War Is Hell #9-15; Man-Thing (1979) #10–11; Marvel Presents #1–2; material from Vampire Tales #2–4, 6, 8–9, Marvel Preview #7–8, 12, 16, Monsters Unleashed (1973) #9, Haunt of Horror (1974) #2, 4–5, Dracula Lives! #10–11, The Tomb of Dracula black and white magazine #3, 5–6, Solo Avengers #5, Rampaging Hulk #1–6, 8, Strange Tales (1951) #73 and Legion of Monsters (1975) #1	1,176	14 Oct 2020	Inhyuk Lee cover: 978-1302927462
	Marvel Horror Lives Again!	1961-1981		1,176	14 Oct 2020	John Romita Sr. DM cover: 978-1302927479
	August 1961	1961	Journey into Mystery #73–74, Kathy #13, Life with Millie #13, Patsy Walker #97, Amazing Adventures #6, Fantastic Four #1, Kid Colt, Outlaw #101, Linda Carter, Student Nurse #2, Millie the Model #105, Strange Tales #90, Tales of Suspense #23, Tales to Astonish #25, Gunsmoke Western #67, Love Romances #96, Teen-Age Romance #84, Amazing Adult Fantasy #7, Patsy and Hedy #79, Rawhide Kid #25	520	11 Aug 2021	Javier Rodriguez cover: 978-1302930486
	August 1961	1961	Journey into Mystery #73–74, Kathy #13, Life with Millie #13, Patsy Walker #97, Amazing Adventures #6, Fantastic Four #1, Kid Colt, Outlaw #101, Linda Carter, Student Nurse #2, Millie the Model #105, Strange Tales #90, Tales of Suspense #23, Tales to Astonish #25, Gunsmoke Western #67, Love Romances #96, Teen-Age Romance #84, Amazing Adult Fantasy #7, Patsy and Hedy #79, Rawhide Kid #25	520	11 Aug 2021	Jack Kirby DM cover: 978-1302930493
	June 1962	1962	Journey into Mystery (1952) #83; Amazing Fantasy (1962) #15; Tales to Astonish (1959) #35; Kathy (1959) #18; Life with Millie (1960) #18; Patsy Walker (1945) #102; Kid Colt, Outlaw (1948) #106; Fantastic Four (1961) #6; Linda Carter, Student Nurse (1961) #7; Millie the Model (1945) #110; Strange Tales (1951) #100; Tales of Suspense (1959) #33; Love Romances (1949) #101; The Incredible Hulk (1962) #3; Gunsmoke Western (1955) #72; Patsy and Hedy (1952) #84; Rawhide Kid (1955) #30	504	31 May 2022	Javier Rodriguez cover: 978-1302945046
	June 1962	1962	Journey into Mystery (1952) #83; Amazing Fantasy (1962) #15; Tales to Astonish (1959) #35; Kathy (1959) #18; Life with Millie (1960) #18; Patsy Walker (1945) #102; Kid Colt, Outlaw (1948) #106; Fantastic Four (1961) #6; Linda Carter, Student Nurse (1961) #7; Millie the Model (1945) #110; Strange Tales (1951) #100; Tales of Suspense (1959) #33; Love Romances (1949) #101; The Incredible Hulk (1962) #3; Gunsmoke Western (1955) #72; Patsy and Hedy (1952) #84; Rawhide Kid (1955) #30	504	31 May 2022	Steve Ditko Spider-Man DM cover: 978-1302945053
	July 1963	1963	Avengers (1963) #1; Amazing Spider-Man (1963) #5; Fantastic Four (1961) #19, Annual (1963) #1; Journey into Mystery (1952) #96; Modeling with Millie (1963) #25; Patsy and Hedy (1952) #90, Annual (1963) #1; Patsy Walker (1945) #109; Rawhide Kid (1955) #36; Sgt. Fury (1963) #3; Strange Tales (1951) #113; Tales of Suspense (1959) #46; Tales to Astonish (1959) #48; X-Men (1963) #1; Kathy (1959) #25; Kid Colt: Outlaw (1948) #113; Millie the Model (1945) #117; Two-Gun Kid (1948) #66	656	27 Jun 2023	Javier Rodriguez cover: 978-1302950088
	July 1963	1963	Avengers (1963) #1; Amazing Spider-Man (1963) #5; Fantastic Four (1961) #19, Annual (1963) #1; Journey into Mystery (1952) #96; Modeling with Millie (1963) #25; Patsy and Hedy (1952) #90, Annual (1963) #1; Patsy Walker (1945) #109; Rawhide Kid (1955) #36; Sgt. Fury (1963) #3; Strange Tales (1951) #113; Tales of Suspense (1959) #46; Tales to Astonish (1959) #48; X-Men (1963) #1; Kathy (1959) #25; Kid Colt: Outlaw (1948) #113; Millie the Model (1945) #117; Two-Gun Kid (1948) #66	656	27 Jun 2023	Jack Kirby Avengers DM cover: 978-1302950095
	July 1963	1963	Avengers (1963) #1; Amazing Spider-Man (1963) #5; Fantastic Four (1961) #19, Annual (1963) #1; Journey into Mystery (1952) #96; Modeling with Millie (1963) #25; Patsy and Hedy (1952) #90, Annual (1963) #1; Patsy Walker (1945) #109; Rawhide Kid (1955) #36; Sgt. Fury (1963) #3; Strange Tales (1951) #113; Tales of Suspense (1959) #46; Tales to Astonish (1959) #48; X-Men (1963) #1; Kathy (1959) #25; Kid Colt: Outlaw (1948) #113; Millie the Model (1945) #117; Two-Gun Kid (1948) #66	656	27 Jun 2023	Jack Kirby X-Men DM cover: 978-1302950897
	February 1964	1964	Daredevil (1964) #1, Amazing Spider-Man (1963) #12, Fantastic Four (1961) #26, Journey Into Mystery (1952) #103, Kid Colt Outlaw (1948) #116, Millie the Model (1945) #120, Modeling with Millie (1963) #30, Patsy Walker (1945) #114, Strange Tales (1951) #120, Tales of Suspense (1959) #53, Tales to Astonish (1959) #55, Two-Gun Kid (1948) #69, Avengers (1963) #5, Patsy and Hedy (1952) #94, Rawhide Kid (1955) #40, Sgt. Fury (1963) #7, X-Men (1963) #5	480	6 Feb 2024	Javier Rodriguez cover: 978-1302954871
	February 1964	1964	Daredevil (1964) #1, Amazing Spider-Man (1963) #12, Fantastic Four (1961) #26, Journey Into Mystery (1952) #103, Kid Colt Outlaw (1948) #116, Millie the Model (1945) #120, Modeling with Millie (1963) #30, Patsy Walker (1945) #114, Strange Tales (1951) #120, Tales of Suspense (1959) #53, Tales to Astonish (1959) #55, Two-Gun Kid (1948) #69, Avengers (1963) #5, Patsy and Hedy (1952) #94, Rawhide Kid (1955) #40, Sgt. Fury (1963) #7, X-Men (1963) #5	480	6 Feb 2024	Jack Kirby Daredevil DM cover: 978-1302954888
	May 1965	1965	Strange Tales (1951) #135, X-Men (1963) #12, Journey into Mystery (1952) #118, Tales to Astonish (1959) #70, Patsy and Hedy (1952) #101, Rawhide Kid (1955) #47, Fantastic Four (1961) #41, Amazing Spider-Man (1963) #27, Avengers (1963) #18, Tales of Suspense (1959) #68, Sgt. Fury (1963) #20, Daredevil (1964) #9, Modeling with Millie (1963) #40, Patsy Walker (1945) #122, Kid Colt Outlaw (1948) #124, Two-Gun Kid (1948) #77, Millie the Model (1945) #130	496	29 Apr 2025	Javier Rodriguez cover: 978-1302962258
	May 1965	1965	Strange Tales (1951) #135, X-Men (1963) #12, Journey into Mystery (1952) #118, Tales to Astonish (1959) #70, Patsy and Hedy (1952) #101, Rawhide Kid (1955) #47, Fantastic Four (1961) #41, Amazing Spider-Man (1963) #27, Avengers (1963) #18, Tales of Suspense (1959) #68, Sgt. Fury (1963) #20, Daredevil (1964) #9, Modeling with Millie (1963) #40, Patsy Walker (1945) #122, Kid Colt Outlaw (1948) #124, Two-Gun Kid (1948) #77, Millie the Model (1945) #130	496	29 Apr 2025	Jack Kirby Nick Fury DM cover: 978-1302962265
	Marvel NOW!	2012	Uncanny Avengers #1; Marvel NOW! Point One #1; A+X #1; Deadpool #1, and more: Iron Man #1; All-New X-Men #1; Fantastic Four #1; Thor: God of Thunder #1; X-Men Legacy #1; Captain America #1; Indestructible Hulk #1; FF #1; Avengers #1; T-Bolts #1; Avengers Arena #1; Cable/X-Force #1; New Avengers #1; Superior Spider-Man #1; Savage Wolverine #1; Young Avengers #1; Uncanny X-Men #1; Secret Avengers #1; Nova #1; Guardians of the Galaxy #1; Red She-Hulk #58; Fearless Defenders #1; Journey into Mystery #646; Morbius #1; Uncanny X-Force #1; Wolverine #1; X-Men #1; Avengers Assemble #9	776	17 Jul 2013	Joe Quesada cover: 978-0785183808
	Women of Marvel: Celebrating Seven Decades	1960-1991	Tales to Astonish #51–58; X-Men #57; Night Nurse #1–4; The Claws of the Cat #1–4; Shanna the She-Devil #1–5; Marvel Team-Up #8; Giant-Size Creatures #1; Marvel Premiere #42; Ka-Zar, Lord of the Hidden Jungle #2; Daredevil #108–112; Marvel Two-in-One #3; Marvel Graphic Novel No. 12 - Dazzler: The Movie, No. 16 - The Aladdin Effect and No. 18 - The Sensational She-Hulk; Firestar #1–4; Sensational She-Hulk: Ceremony #1–2; Captain Marvel #1 (1989); Captain Marvel #1 (1994); Millie the Model #100; Patsy and Hedy Annual #1; Solo Avengers #9; Marvel Comics Presents #36; Marvel Fanfare #59	1,160	5 Jan 2011	Olivier Coipel cover: 978-0785143260
	Women of Marvel: Celebrating Seven Decades	1960-1991		1,160	5 Jan 2011	Ramona Fradon DM cover: 978-0785149996

== Alternate universe omnibuses ==
As part of the Marvel multiverse, other fictional continuities exist. Books in this section still contain Marvel characters; however, they are alternate versions who don't, or rarely, interact with characters from the mainstream Earth-616 section.

=== 2099 ===
Marvel's 2099 universe was a project "intended to explore the future of the Marvel Comics universe", that was imagined by writer Stan Lee, as something for him to work on with artist John Byrne. The collaboration "fell through"; however, the line was commissioned by Editor Joey Cavalieri. He said the books "offered a chance to create the Marvel Universe all over again. At the very beginning of the Marvel Universe of 2099, there are no superheroes. We start to see them, one by one, just as you did in the '60s." The 2099 universe is designated as Earth-2099.

#	Title	Years covered	Material collected	Pages	Released	ISBN
	Fantastic Four/Doom 2099	1993-1996	Doom 2099 (1993) #1–24, 25 (A and C stories), 26-44, 2099 A.D. Apocalypse #1, Fantastic Four 2099 (1996) #1–8, Fantastic Four (1961) #413; material from 2099 Unlimited (1993) #5–8, 2099 A.D. Genesis #1, 2099 Special: World of Doom (1995) #1	1,448	17 Jun 2025	Pat Broderick Doom cover: 978-1302964153
	Fantastic Four/Doom 2099	1993-1996	Doom 2099 (1993) #1–24, 25 (A and C stories), 26-44, 2099 A.D. Apocalypse #1, Fantastic Four 2099 (1996) #1–8, Fantastic Four (1961) #413; material from 2099 Unlimited (1993) #5–8, 2099 A.D. Genesis #1, 2099 Special: World of Doom (1995) #1	1,448	17 Jun 2025	Rick Leonardi FF DM cover: 978-1302964160
	Ghost Rider 2099	1994-1996	Ghost Rider 2099 (1994) #1–25; material from 2099: Manifest Destiny #1	632	22 Oct 2024	Chris Bachalo cover: 978-1302959623
	Ghost Rider 2099	1994-1996	Ghost Rider 2099 (1994) #1–25; material from 2099: Manifest Destiny #1	632	22 Oct 2024	Chris Sprouse DM cover: 978-1302959630
1	Spider-Man 2099 Omnibus Vol. 1	1993-1996	Spider-Man 2099 #1–46, Annual #1, Special; Ravage 2099 #15; X-Men 2099 #5; Doom 2099 #14; Punisher 2099 #13; Spider-Man 2099 Meets Spider-Man	1,384	25 Oct 2022	Jim Fern cover: 978-1302947798
1	Spider-Man 2099 Omnibus Vol. 1	1993-1996	Spider-Man 2099 #1–46, Annual #1, Special; Ravage 2099 #15; X-Men 2099 #5; Doom 2099 #14; Punisher 2099 #13; Spider-Man 2099 Meets Spider-Man	1,384	25 Oct 2022	Rick Leonardi DM cover: 978-1302947804
2	Spider-Man 2099 Omnibus Vol. 2	2014-2017	Spider-Man 2099 (vol. 2) #1–12; Spider-Man 2099 (vol. 3) #1–25; Captain Marvel (1999) #27–30; Superior Spider-Man #17–19; Secret Wars 2099 #1–5; material from 2099 Unlimited (1993) #1–3, 8–10; Amazing Spider-Man (vol. 3) #1; Amazing Spider-Man (vol. 4) #1	1,256	2 Apr 2024	Simon Bianchi cover: 978-1302953836
2	Spider-Man 2099 Omnibus Vol. 2	2014-2017	Spider-Man 2099 (vol. 2) #1–12; Spider-Man 2099 (vol. 3) #1–25; Captain Marvel (1999) #27–30; Superior Spider-Man #17–19; Secret Wars 2099 #1–5; material from 2099 Unlimited (1993) #1–3, 8–10; Amazing Spider-Man (vol. 3) #1; Amazing Spider-Man (vol. 4) #1	1,256	2 Apr 2024	Pasqual Ferry DM cover: 978-1302953843
	X-Men 2099	1993-1996	X-Men 2099 #1–35, Special #1; Spider-Man 2099 #16; Ravage 2099 #15; Doom 2099 #14; Punisher 2099 #13; X-Men 2099: Oasis #1; X-Nation 2099 #1–6	1,232	30 Apr 2024	Ron Lim cover: 978-1302952068
	X-Men 2099	1993-1996	X-Men 2099 #1–35, Special #1; Spider-Man 2099 #16; Ravage 2099 #15; Doom 2099 #14; Punisher 2099 #13; X-Men 2099: Oasis #1; X-Nation 2099 #1–6	1,232	30 Apr 2024	Greg Hildebrandt DM cover: 978-1302952075

=== Earth X ===
The Earth X universe was created by Dave Kreuger and Alex Ross, and "showed a possible near future for the Marvel Universe". The project came from "an article for Wizard Magazine and their reaction to the amazing work Alex had done in reimagining and designing the DCU for Kingdom Come." The Earth X universe is designated as Earth-9997.

#	Title	Years covered	Material collected	Pages	Released	ISBN
1	Earth X Trilogy: Alpha	1999-2001	Earth X #0–12, X, ½; Earth X Epilogue; Earth X Sketchbook; Universe X #0–12, X; Universe X 4; Universe X Spidey; Universe X Cap; Universe X Beasts; Universe X Iron Men	1,304	5 Sep 2018	978-1302913175
2	Earth X Trilogy: Omega	2001-2003	Paradise X: Heralds #1–3; Paradise X #0–12; Paradise X Xen; Paradise X Devils; Paradise X A; Paradise X X; Paradise X Special Edition; Paradise X: Ragnarok #1–2; Nighthawk #1–3	840	13 Mar 2019	978-1302916220

=== Marvel Cinematic Universe ===
#	Title	Years covered	Material collected	Pages	Released	ISBN
	The Marvel Cinematic Universe: The Marvel Comics	2010-2018	Iron Man: I Am Iron Man! #1–2; Iron Man 2: Agents of S.H.I.E.L.D.; Iron Man 2: Public Identity #1–3; Iron Man 2 Adaptation #1–2; Thor Adaptation #1–2; Captain America: First Vengeance #1–4; Captain America: The First Avenger Adaptation #1–2; Avengers Prelude: Fury's Big Week #1–4; Avengers: Black Widow Strikes #1–3; Avengers Adaptation #1–2; Iron Man 3 Prelude #1–2; Thor: The Dark World Prelude #1–2; Captain America: The Winter Soldier Infinite Comic; Guardians of the Galaxy Prelude #1–2; Guardians of the Galaxy Infinite Comic; Avengers: Age of Ultron Prelude - Infinite Comic; Ant-Man Prelude #1–2, Ant-Man Infinite Comic; Captain America: Civil War Prelude #1–4; Captain America: Civil War Infinite Comic; Doctor Strange Prelude #1–2; Doctor Strange Infinite Comic; Guardians of the Galaxy Vol. 2 Prelude #1–2, Spider-Man: Homecoming Prelude #1–2; Thor: Ragnarok Prelude #1–4; Black Panther Prelude #1–2; Avengers: Infinity War Prelude #1–2; Ant-Man and the Wasp Prelude #1–2	1,304	16 Oct 2018	978-1302913236

=== Marvel: The End ===
After a two-year run on The Incredible Hulk in the 1990s, writer Peter David and artist Dale Keown re-teamed for Hulk: The End, a one-shot showcasing the character's final days. The success of that book led to multiple miniseries in the following six years, chronicling the final days of various Marvel Universe superheroes.

After 12 years with no further material, a further series of one-shots was announced at the 2019 New York Comic Con.

Marvel's The End omnibus contains the full run of all material across 18 years.

#	Title	Years covered	Material collected	Pages	Released	ISBN
	Marvel: The End	2002-2020	Hulk: The End (2002) #1, Marvel Universe: The End (2003) #1–6, Wolverine: The End (2003) #1–6, X-Men: The End Book One (2004) #1–6, X-Men: The End Book Two (2005) #1–6, X-Men: The End Book Three (2006) #1–6, Fantastic Four: The End (2006) #1–6, Iron Man: The End (2008) #1, Captain America: The End (2020) #1, Captain Marvel: The End (2020) #1, Deadpool: The End (2020) #1, Doctor Strange: The End (2020) #1, Miles Morales: The End (2020) #1, Venom: The End (2020) #1	1,168	7 Jan 2025	Jim Starlin cover: 978-1302959661
	Marvel: The End	2002-2020	Hulk: The End (2002) #1, Marvel Universe: The End (2003) #1–6, Wolverine: The End (2003) #1–6, X-Men: The End Book One (2004) #1–6, X-Men: The End Book Two (2005) #1–6, X-Men: The End Book Three (2006) #1–6, Fantastic Four: The End (2006) #1–6, Iron Man: The End (2008) #1, Captain America: The End (2020) #1, Captain Marvel: The End (2020) #1, Deadpool: The End (2020) #1, Doctor Strange: The End (2020) #1, Miles Morales: The End (2020) #1, Venom: The End (2020) #1	1,168	7 Jan 2025	Claudio Castellini Wolverine DM cover: 978-1302959678

=== Marvel Zombies ===
The first appearance of Marvel Zombies was in Ultimate Fantastic Four #21, written by Mark Millar. He said: "I had this idea on the plane from Scotland about a superhero arriving from another dimension with a zombie plague and biting the Avengers when they showed up to contain the problem. Everyone hated it. It was so universally loathed and everyone thought I was kidding when I suggested it."

Despite that, after the first appearance, the concept grew to launch its own series, with Marvel Zombies and Marvel Zombies 2 written by The Walking Dead creator, Robert Kirkman. The initial Zombies universe is designated Earth-2149.

#	Title	Years covered	Material collected	Pages	Released	ISBN
1	Marvel Zomnibus	2005-2011	Marvel Zombies: Dead Days #1; Marvel Apes: Prime Eight #1; Marvel Zombies: Evil Evolution #1; Ultimate Fantastic Four #21–23, 30–32; Marvel Zombies #1–5; Black Panther (2005) #28–30; Marvel Zombies 2 #1–5; Marvel Zombies Return #1–5; Marvel Zombies 3 #1–4; Marvel Zombies 4 #1–4; Marvel Zombies 5 #1–5; Marvel Zombies Supreme #1–5	1,200	19 Sep 2012	Arthur Suydam Secret Wars cover: 978-0785140269
1	Marvel Zomnibus	2005-2011	Marvel Zombies: Dead Days #1; Marvel Apes: Prime Eight #1; Marvel Zombies: Evil Evolution #1; Ultimate Fantastic Four #21–23, 30–32; Marvel Zombies #1–5; Black Panther (2005) #28–30; Marvel Zombies 2 #1–5; Marvel Zombies Return #1–5; Marvel Zombies 3 #1–4; Marvel Zombies 4 #1–4; Marvel Zombies 5 #1–5; Marvel Zombies Supreme #1–5	1,200	4 Jul 2023	Arthur Suydam Spider-Man cover: 978-1302951849
1	Marvel Zomnibus	2005-2011	Marvel Zombies: Dead Days #1; Marvel Apes: Prime Eight #1; Marvel Zombies: Evil Evolution #1; Ultimate Fantastic Four #21–23, 30–32; Marvel Zombies #1–5; Black Panther (2005) #28–30; Marvel Zombies 2 #1–5; Marvel Zombies Return #1–5; Marvel Zombies 3 #1–4; Marvel Zombies 4 #1–4; Marvel Zombies 5 #1–5; Marvel Zombies Supreme #1–5	1,200	4 Jul 2023	Arthur Suydam Secret Wars DM cover: 978-1302951832
2	Marvel Zomnibus Returns	2009-2020	Deadpool: Merc with a Mouth (2009) #1–13, A Zombies Christmas Carol (2011) #1–5, Marvel Zombies Destroy! (2012) #1–5, Marvel Zombies Halloween (2012) #1, Marvel Zombies (2015) #1–4, Age of Ultron vs. Marvel Zombies (2015) #1–4, Marvel Zombie (2018) #1, Marvel Zombies: Resurrection (2019) #1, Marvel Zombies: Resurrection (2020) #1–4	976	24 Oct 2023	Inhyuk Lee cover: 978-1302953782
2	Marvel Zomnibus Returns	2009-2020	Deadpool: Merc with a Mouth (2009) #1–13, A Zombies Christmas Carol (2011) #1–5, Marvel Zombies Destroy! (2012) #1–5, Marvel Zombies Halloween (2012) #1, Marvel Zombies (2015) #1–4, Age of Ultron vs. Marvel Zombies (2015) #1–4, Marvel Zombie (2018) #1, Marvel Zombies: Resurrection (2019) #1, Marvel Zombies: Resurrection (2020) #1–4	976	24 Oct 2023	Greg Land DM cover: 978-1302953799

=== Strikeforce: Morituri ===
Strikeforce: Morituri is a largely standalone series, created by Peter B. Gillis and Brent Anderson, that was published by Marvel Comics from 1986. It saw "an alien invasion of Earth, countered by a programme that turned humans into superhumans, but would kill them in a year." There were disputes over the series' ownership up until Gillis's death in June 2024. The Strikeforce: Morituri universe is designated as Earth-1287.

#	Title	Years covered	Material collected	Pages	Released	ISBN
	Strikeforce: Morituri	1986-1989	Strikeforce: Morituri (1986) #1–31, Strikeforce: Morituri: Electric Undertow (1989) #1–5	1,080	13 May 2025	Brent Anderson Ultimate Sacrifice cover: 978-1302963804
	Strikeforce: Morituri	1986-1989	Strikeforce: Morituri (1986) #1–31, Strikeforce: Morituri: Electric Undertow (1989) #1–5	1,080	13 May 2025	Brent Anderson Path's Glory DM cover: 978-1302963811

=== Ultimate Marvel omnibuses ===
Ultimate Marvel launched in 2000 as a response to "so much backstory that the stories (in the main books) were almost incomprehensible."

Bill Jemas, President of Marvel Enterprises from 2000 to 2004, wrote: "Joe Quesada and I started the Ultimate books because we wanted Marvel to get back in touch with kids. We wanted Marvel's great teen heroes - Spidey and the X-Men - to star in comics for 2001 kids." The first Ultimate universe is designated as Earth-1610.

#	Title	Years covered	Material collected	Pages	Released	ISBN
1	Ultimate Marvel	2000-2004	Ultimate Spider-Man #1–7; Ultimate X-Men #1–6; The Ultimates #1–6; Ultimate Fantastic Four #1–6	768	18 Aug 2015	978-0785197508
	Ultimate Marvel by Jonathan Hickman	2010-2012	Ultimate Thor #1-4, Ultimate Comics Hawkeye #1-4, Ultimate Comics Ultimates #1-12, material from Ultimate Fallout #2-6	560	19 Mar 2024	Kaare Andrews cover: 978-1302956936
	Ultimate Marvel by Jonathan Hickman	2010-2012	Ultimate Thor #1-4, Ultimate Comics Hawkeye #1-4, Ultimate Comics Ultimates #1-12, material from Ultimate Fallout #2-6	560	19 Mar 2024	Olivier Coipel DM cover: 978-1302956943

==== Ultimate Fantastic Four ====
After Ultimate Spider-Man, Ultimate X-Men, and The Ultimates, Ultimate Fantastic Four was the final core book to launch in Marvel's new universe. Writers Mark Millar and Brian Michael Bendis worked together with artist Adam Kubert for the first six-issue arc, before Warren Ellis took on the series.

Compared to the main universe counterparts, the new series saw: "The more "superheroic" elements of the series done away with, as the Ultimate Fantastic Four book focused more on science fiction and exploration. Doctor Doom was given a less cartoony characterization than his more well-known mainstream counterpart. Other villains such as Mole Man, Annihilus and even Galactus also received massive makeovers."

#	Title	Years covered	Material collected	Pages	Released	ISBN
1	Ultimate Fantastic Four Vol. 1	2004-2007	Ultimate Fantastic Four #1–32, Annual #1	856	11 Feb 2025	Stuart Immonen cover: 978-1302963668
1	Ultimate Fantastic Four Vol. 1	2004-2007	Ultimate Fantastic Four #1–32, Annual #1	856	11 Feb 2025	Jae Lee DM cover: 978-1302963675
2	Ultimate Fantastic Four Vol. 2	2007-2009	Ultimate Fantastic Four #33–60, Annual #2; Ultimate X-Men/Fantastic Four, Annual; Ultimate Fantastic Four/X-Men, Annual; Ultimatum: Fantastic Four Requiem	896	21 Apr 2026	Pasqual Ferry Silver Surfer cover: 978-1302967970
2	Ultimate Fantastic Four Vol. 2	2007-2009	Ultimate Fantastic Four #33–60, Annual #2; Ultimate X-Men/Fantastic Four, Annual; Ultimate Fantastic Four/X-Men, Annual; Ultimatum: Fantastic Four Requiem	896	21 Apr 2026	Pasqual Ferry Thanos DM cover: 978-1302967987

==== Ultimate Spider-Man ====
The first book in Marvel's Ultimate Universe was Ultimate Spider-Man. The title ran from 2000 until 2012, with a younger version of Peter Parker as the main protagonist. The new iteration was a response to "so much backstory that the stories (in the main books) were almost incomprehensible."

Bill Jemas, President of Marvel Enterprises from 2000 to 2004, wrote: "Joe Quesada and I started the Ultimate books because we wanted Marvel to get back in touch with kids. We wanted Marvel's great teen heroes - Spidey and the X-Men - to star in comics for 2001 kids."

The title went on to run for more than 150 issues and launched the character of Miles Morales.

- See also: Ultimate Spider-Man collected editions

#	Title	Years covered	Material collected	Pages	Released	ISBN
1	Ultimate Spider-Man Vol. 1	2000-2003	Ultimate Spider-Man #1–39, ½	1,000	2 Jun 2012	Joe Quesada cover: 978-0785164753
1	Ultimate Spider-Man Vol. 1	2000-2003	Ultimate Spider-Man #1–39, ½	1,000	2 Jun 2012	Mark Bagley DM cover: 978-0785164982
1	Ultimate Spider-Man Vol. 1	2000-2003	Ultimate Spider-Man #1–39, ½	1,000	4 Jan 2022	Joe Quesada cover: 978-1302931872
1	Ultimate Spider-Man Vol. 1	2000-2003	Ultimate Spider-Man #1–39, ½	1,000	4 Jan 2022	Joe Quesada web DM cover: 978-1302931889
1	Ultimate Spider-Man Vol. 1	2000-2003	Ultimate Spider-Man #1–39, ½	1,000	4 Jan 2022	Mark Bagley Venom DM cover: 978-1302931865
2	Ultimate Spider-Man Vol. 2	2003-2005	Ultimate Spider-Man #40–71, Ultimate Six #1–7	984	17 Jan 2023	Mark Bagley cover: 978-1302947484
2	Ultimate Spider-Man Vol. 2	2003-2005	Ultimate Spider-Man #40–71, Ultimate Six #1–7	984	17 Jan 2023	Mark Bagley Carnage DM cover: 978-1302947484
2	Ultimate Spider-Man Vol. 2	2003-2005	Ultimate Spider-Man #40–71, Ultimate Six #1–7	984	17 Jan 2023	John Cassaday Sinister Six DM cover: 978-1302947491
2	Ultimate Spider-Man Vol. 2	2003-2005	Ultimate Spider-Man #40–71, Ultimate Six #1–7	984	4 Aug 2026	Mark Bagley cover: 978-1302970659
2	Ultimate Spider-Man Vol. 2	2003-2005	Ultimate Spider-Man #40–71, Ultimate Six #1–7	984	4 Aug 2026	Mark Bagley Carnage DM cover: 978-1302970666
2	Ultimate Spider-Man Vol. 2	2003-2005	Ultimate Spider-Man #40–71, Ultimate Six #1–7	984	4 Aug 2026	John Cassaday Sinister Six DM cover: 978-1302970673
3	Ultimate Spider-Man Vol. 3	2005-2007	Ultimate Spider-Man #72–111, Annual #1–2	1,088	6 Dec 2023	Mark Bagley cover: 978-1302950194
3	Ultimate Spider-Man Vol. 3	2005-2007	Ultimate Spider-Man #72–111, Annual #1–2	1,088	6 Dec 2023	Mark Bagley Carnage DM cover: 978-1302950323
3	Ultimate Spider-Man Vol. 3	2005-2007	Ultimate Spider-Man #72–111, Annual #1–2	1,088	6 Dec 2023	Mark Bagley Moon Knight DM cover: 978-1302950200
4	Ultimate Spider-Man Vol. 4	2007-2010	Ultimate Spider-Man #112–133, Annual #3, Ultimatum: Spider-Man – Requiem #1–2, Ultimate Spider-Man (vol. 2) #1–15	1,008	27 Aug 2024	Stuart Immonen cover: 978-1302959555
4	Ultimate Spider-Man Vol. 4	2007-2010	Ultimate Spider-Man #112–133, Annual #3, Ultimatum: Spider-Man – Requiem #1–2, Ultimate Spider-Man (vol. 2) #1–15	1,008	27 Aug 2024	Stuart Immonen X-Men DM cover: 978-1302959562
5	Ultimate Spider-Man Vol. 5	2010-2011; 2001-2002	Ultimate Spider-Man (vol. 2) #150–160; Ultimate Comics Fallout #1; Ultimate Marvel Team-Up #1-16; Ultimate Spider-Man Super Special; material from Ultimate Comics Fallout #2, 4, 6	856	18 Nov 2025	David LaFuente cover: 978-1302965464
5	Ultimate Spider-Man Vol. 5	2010-2011; 2001-2002	Ultimate Spider-Man (vol. 2) #150–160; Ultimate Comics Fallout #1; Ultimate Marvel Team-Up #1-16; Ultimate Spider-Man Super Special; material from Ultimate Comics Fallout #2, 4, 6	856	18 Nov 2025	Mark Bagley DM cover: 978-1302965471
5 (Alt)	Ultimate Comics Spider-Man: Death of Spider-Man	2010-2011	Ultimate Spider-Man (vol. 2) #15, 150–160; Ultimate Avengers vs. New Ultimates #1–6; Ultimate Comics Fallout #1–6	608	28 Nov 2012	Joe Quesada cover: 978-0785164647
5 (Alt)	Ultimate Comics Spider-Man: Death of Spider-Man	2010-2011	Ultimate Spider-Man (vol. 2) #15, 150–160; Ultimate Avengers vs. New Ultimates #1–6; Ultimate Comics Fallout #1–6	608	27 Feb 2024	Joe Quesada cover: 978-1302957551
5 (Alt)	Ultimate Comics Spider-Man: Death of Spider-Man	2010-2011	Ultimate Spider-Man (vol. 2) #15, 150–160; Ultimate Avengers vs. New Ultimates #1–6; Ultimate Comics Fallout #1–6	608	27 Feb 2024	Mark Bagley Sinister Six DM cover: 978-1302957568
Jump to: Miles Morales: Spider-Man

==== Ultimate X-Men ====
Launched by writer Mark Millar, Ultimate X-Men saw "the superheroic side of the franchise pushed a bit to the sidelines. Instead, the prejudice mutants faced on a daily basis took center stage."

Millar was followed by superstar writers Brian Michael Bendis, Brian K Vaughan, and Robert Kirkman, and "the Ultimate X-Men comics quickly became the most popular titles at Marvel Comics, even outselling X-Men books in the mainstream continuity."

#	Title	Years covered	Material collected	Pages	Released	ISBN
1	Ultimate X-Men Vol. 1	2001-2003	Ultimate X-Men #1–33, 1/2; Ultimate War #1–4	1,024	25 Oct 2022	Adam Kubert X-Men cover: 978-1302946357
1	Ultimate X-Men Vol. 1	2001-2003	Ultimate X-Men #1–33, 1/2; Ultimate War #1–4	1,024	25 Oct 2022	Adam Kubert Wolverine DM cover: 978-1302946364
2	Ultimate X-Men Vol. 2	2003-2006	Ultimate X-Men #34–74, Annual #1–2; Ultimate X-Men/Fantastic Four #1; Ultimate Fantastic Four/X-Men #1	1,160	13 Feb 2024	David Finch cover: 978-1302950118
2	Ultimate X-Men Vol. 2	2003-2006	Ultimate X-Men #34–74, Annual #1–2; Ultimate X-Men/Fantastic Four #1; Ultimate Fantastic Four/X-Men #1	1,160	13 Feb 2024	Andy Kubert DM cover: 978-1302950125
3	Ultimate X-Men Vol. 3	2006-2009	Ultimate X-Men #75-100; Ultimate Wolverine vs. Hulk #1–6; Ultimate X-Men/Ultimate Fantastic Four Annual (2008); Ultimate Fantastic Four/Ultimate X-Men Annual (2008); Ultimatum #1-5; Ultimatum X-Men Requiem	1,088	20 Jan 2026	Michael Turner cover: 978-1302963620
3	Ultimate X-Men Vol. 3	2006-2009	Ultimate X-Men #75-100; Ultimate Wolverine vs. Hulk #1–6; Ultimate X-Men/Ultimate Fantastic Four Annual (2008); Ultimate Fantastic Four/Ultimate X-Men Annual (2008); Ultimatum #1-5; Ultimatum X-Men Requiem	1,088	20 Jan 2026	Ed McGuinness DM cover: 978-1302963637
4	Ultimate X-Men Vol. 4	2009-2013	Ultimate Comics X #1-5; Ultimate Comics X-Men #1-33; #18.1, Ultimate Comics Wolverine #1-4; Cataclysm: Ultimate X-Men (2013) #1-3; Cataclysm: The Ultimates' Last Stand #4-5; material from Ultimate Fallout #2-6	1,136	4 Aug 2026	Kaare Andrews cover: 978-1302969394
4	Ultimate X-Men Vol. 4	2009-2013	Ultimate Comics X #1-5; Ultimate Comics X-Men #1-33; #18.1, Ultimate Comics Wolverine #1-4; Cataclysm: Ultimate X-Men (2013) #1-3; Cataclysm: The Ultimates' Last Stand #4-5; material from Ultimate Fallout #2-6	1,136	4 Aug 2026	Arthur Adams DM cover: 978-1302969400
Jump to: X-Men

==== Ultimates ====
The Ultimates portrayed a version of the Avengers outside of the main Marvel continuity that "looked and sounded like a movie in a way that no Marvel story ever had."

Written by Mark Millar, and drawn by Bryan Hitch, the comic blurred the lines of right and wrong, where the heroes "have no idea they are supervillains. They think they're merely doing what superheroes are supposed to do: defend truth, justice, and the American Way — with an emphasis on the latter." Millar conceded that point, describing the series as a "pro-status quo book" and "kind of a right-wing book, like Rush Limbaugh doing super comics".

Director of Marvel Studio's 2012 The Avengers movie, Joss Whedon, said: "It's my feeling that Ultimates brought Marvel into the modern age in a way no other book did."

#	Title	Years covered	Material collected	Pages	Released	ISBN
	Ultimates by Mark Millar and Bryan Hitch	2002-2007	Ultimates #1–13; Ultimates 2 #1–13, Annual #1; Ultimates 2 #1 (retailer sketch variant)	880	1 Jul 2009	Bryan Hitch cover: 978-0785137801
	Ultimates by Mark Millar and Bryan Hitch	2002-2007	Ultimates #1–13; Ultimates 2 #1–13, Annual #1; Ultimates 2 #1 (retailer sketch variant)	880	25 Feb 2020	Bryan Hitch cover: 978-1302922658
	Ultimates by Mark Millar and Bryan Hitch	2002-2007	Ultimates #1–13; Ultimates 2 #1–13, Annual #1; Ultimates 2 #1 (retailer sketch variant)	856	15 Nov 2022	Bryan Hitch Ultimates cover: 978-1302945657
	Ultimates by Mark Millar and Bryan Hitch	2002-2007	Ultimates #1–13; Ultimates 2 #1–13, Annual #1; Ultimates 2 #1 (retailer sketch variant)	856	15 Nov 2022	Bryan Hitch Ultimates 2 DM cover: 978-1302945664
	Ultimate Comics Avengers by Mark Millar	2009-2011	Ultimate Avengers #1–6; Ultimate Avengers 2 #1–6; Ultimate Avengers 3 #1–6; Ultimate Comics: Avengers vs. New Ultimates 1–6	608	2 May 2012	Leinil Francis Yu cover: 978-0785161325

== Licensed omnibuses ==
As well as publishing omnibuses featuring the company's own characters, Marvel also releases books from other franchises. Some of these – like Star Wars – are owned by Marvel's parent company, Disney; others – like Conan or The Dark Tower – are licensed for certain periods of time.

=== Aliens ===
In July 2020, Marvel Comics gained the rights to publish Alien and Predator in the wake of Fox's sale to Disney. Since then, the company has been republishing comics originally produced by Dark Horse comics.

#	Title	Years covered	Material collected	Pages	Released	ISBN
1	Aliens: The Original Years	1988-1992	Aliens (1988) #1–6; Aliens (1989) #1–4; Aliens: Earth War #1–4; Aliens: Genocide #1–4; Aliens: Hive #1–4; Aliens: Tribes #1; Aliens: Newt's Tale #1–2; Alien 3 #1–3; Aliens: Space Marines #1–12 (Kenner); Alien 3: Alone (trading card comic); material from Dark Horse Insider (1989) #14–27 and Dark Horse Presents (1986) #24, 42–43, 56, Fifth Anniversary Special	1,032	23 Apr 2021	Greg Land cover: 978-1302928155
1	Aliens: The Original Years	1988-1992	Aliens (1988) #1–6; Aliens (1989) #1–4; Aliens: Earth War #1–4; Aliens: Genocide #1–4; Aliens: Hive #1–4; Aliens: Tribes #1; Aliens: Newt's Tale #1–2; Alien 3 #1–3; Aliens: Space Marines #1–12 (Kenner); Alien 3: Alone (trading card comic); material from Dark Horse Insider (1989) #14–27 and Dark Horse Presents (1986) #24, 42–43, 56, Fifth Anniversary Special	1,032	23 Apr 2021	Mark Nelson DM cover: 978-1302928162
2	Aliens: The Original Years	1992-1994	Aliens: Rogue #1–4; Aliens: Colonial Marines #1–10; Aliens: Labyrinth #1–4; Aliens: Salvation; Aliens: Music of the Spears #1–4; Aliens: Stronghold #1–4; material from Dark Horse Comics #3–5, 11–13, 15–19, Previews (1993) #1–12, Previews (1994) #1 and Aliens Magazine (1992) #9–20	1,000	11 Jan 2022	Mahmud Asrar cover: 978-1302928902
2	Aliens: The Original Years	1992-1994	Aliens: Rogue #1–4; Aliens: Colonial Marines #1–10; Aliens: Labyrinth #1–4; Aliens: Salvation; Aliens: Music of the Spears #1–4; Aliens: Stronghold #1–4; material from Dark Horse Comics #3–5, 11–13, 15–19, Previews (1993) #1–12, Previews (1994) #1 and Aliens Magazine (1992) #9–20	1,000	11 Jan 2022	Paul Mendoza DM cover: 978-1302928919
3	Aliens: The Original Years	1995-2009	Aliens: Berserker #1–4; Aliens: Mondo Heat #1; Aliens: Lovesick #1; Aliens: Pig #1; Aliens Special #1; Aliens: Havoc #1–2; Aliens: Purge #1; Aliens: Alchemy #1–3; Alien Resurrection #1–2; Aliens: Kidnapped #1–3; Aliens: Survival #1–3; Aliens: Glass Corridor #1; Aliens: Stalker #1; Aliens: Wraith #1; Aliens: Apocalypse – The Destroying Angels #1–4; Aliens: Xenogenesis #1–4; Aliens (2009) #1–4; material from Dark Horse Comics (1992) #22–24, Dark Horse Presents (1986) #101–102, 121, 140, Dark Horse Presents Annual 1997 and A Decade of Dark Horse (1996) #3 of 4; FCBD 2009: Aliens	1,008	22 Nov 2022	Carlos Pacheco cover: 978-1302928926
3	Aliens: The Original Years	1995-2009		1,008	22 Nov 2022	Bernie Wrightson DM cover: 978-1302928933
4	Aliens: The Original Years	2011-2020	Aliens: Fast Track to Heaven #1; Aliens: Colonial Marines – No Man Left Behind #1; Alien: Isolation #1; Aliens: Defiance #1–12; Aliens: Dead Orbit #1–4; Aliens: Dust to Dust #1–4; Aliens 3: The Unproduced Screenplay #1–5; Aliens: Resistance #1–4; Aliens: Rescue #1–4; Alien: The Original Screenplay #1–5; material from Dark Horse Presents (2011) #12–17; FCBD 2016: Aliens	1,032	14 Mar 2023	James Stokoe cover: 978-1302928940
4	Aliens: The Original Years	2011-2020	Aliens: Fast Track to Heaven #1; Aliens: Colonial Marines – No Man Left Behind #1; Alien: Isolation #1; Aliens: Defiance #1–12; Aliens: Dead Orbit #1–4; Aliens: Dust to Dust #1–4; Aliens 3: The Unproduced Screenplay #1–5; Aliens: Resistance #1–4; Aliens: Rescue #1–4; Alien: The Original Screenplay #1–5; material from Dark Horse Presents (2011) #12–17; FCBD 2016: Aliens	1,032	14 Mar 2023	Carlos D'Anda DM cover: 978-1302928957

=== Conan ===
As well as his own series, Conan appeared in Marvel's Savage Avengers series, which ran from 2019.

From 2022 onward, Marvel lost the licence to publish new Conan comics. "The trademark for the name Conan and the names of Robert E. Howard's other principal characters, is maintained by Conan Properties International and licensed to Cabinet Entertainment. This company, or new owners, now wish to publish Conan comic books themselves. And so won't be renewing the Marvel Comics license."

The licence ended up with Titan Publishing.

==== Conan the Barbarian: The Original Marvel Years ====
#	Title	Years covered	Material collected	Pages	Released	ISBN
1	Conan the Barbarian: The Original Marvel Years Vol. 1	1970-1974	Conan the Barbarian #1–26; material from Chamber of Darkness #4 and Savage Tales #1, 4	776	29 Jan 2019	John Cassaday cover: 978-1302915124
1	Conan the Barbarian: The Original Marvel Years Vol. 1	1970-1974	Conan the Barbarian #1–26; material from Chamber of Darkness #4 and Savage Tales #1, 4	776	29 Jan 2019	Barry Windsor-Smith DM cover: 978-1302915131
2	Conan the Barbarian: The Original Marvel Years Vol. 2	1973-1975	Conan the Barbarian #27–51, Annual #1; Giant-Size Conan #1–4; material from Savage Sword of Conan #1, 8, 10	856	24 Jul 2019	Dale Keown cover: 978-1302915148
2	Conan the Barbarian: The Original Marvel Years Vol. 2	1973-1975	Conan the Barbarian #27–51, Annual #1; Giant-Size Conan #1–4; material from Savage Sword of Conan #1, 8, 10	856	24 Jul 2019	Neal Adams DM cover: 978-1302915155
3	Conan the Barbarian: The Original Marvel Years Vol. 3	1975-1977	Conan the Barbarian #52–83, Annual #2; Giant-Size Conan #5; Power Records #31: Conan the Barbarian – Crawler in the Mists; material from Annual #3 and FOOM #14	832	15 Jan 2020	Frank Cho cover: 978-1302917838
3	Conan the Barbarian: The Original Marvel Years Vol. 3	1975-1977	Conan the Barbarian #52–83, Annual #2; Giant-Size Conan #5; Power Records #31: Conan the Barbarian – Crawler in the Mists; material from Annual #3 and FOOM #14	832	15 Jan 2020	Gil Kane DM cover: 978-1302917845
4	Conan the Barbarian: The Original Marvel Years Vol. 4	1977-1980	Conan the Barbarian #84–115, Annual #4–5; What If? #13	848	22 Sep 2020	Valerio Giangiordano cover: 978-1302917890
4	Conan the Barbarian: The Original Marvel Years Vol. 4	1977-1980	Conan the Barbarian #84–115, Annual #4–5; What If? #13	848	22 Sep 2020	John Buscema DM cover: 978-1302917906
5	Conan the Barbarian: The Original Marvel Years Vol. 5	1980-1983	Conan the Barbarian #116–149, Annual #6–7; Marvel Graphic Novel No. 42 – Conan of the Isles; What If? #39	1,048	2 Mar 2021	Alex Ross cover: 978-1302926564
5	Conan the Barbarian: The Original Marvel Years Vol. 5	1980-1983	Conan the Barbarian #116–149, Annual #6–7; Marvel Graphic Novel No. 42 – Conan of the Isles; What If? #39	1,048	2 Mar 2021	Gil Kane DM cover: 978-1302926571
6	Conan the Barbarian: The Original Marvel Years Vol. 6	1983-1985	Conan the Barbarian #150–171, Annual #8–9; What If? #43	672	16 Nov 2021	Paulo Siqueira cover: 978-1302926588
6	Conan the Barbarian: The Original Marvel Years Vol. 6	1983-1985	Conan the Barbarian #150–171, Annual #8–9; What If? #43	672	16 Nov 2021	John Buscema DM cover: 978-1302926595
7	Conan the Barbarian: The Original Marvel Years Vol. 7	1985-1987	Conan the Barbarian #172–194, Annual #10–11	680	8 Mar 2022	Leinil Francis Yu cover: 978-1302934323
7	Conan the Barbarian: The Original Marvel Years Vol. 7	1985-1987	Conan the Barbarian #172–194, Annual #10–11	680	8 Mar 2022	John Buscema DM cover: 978-1302934330
8	Conan the Barbarian: The Original Marvel Years Vol. 8	1986-1988	Conan the Barbarian #195–213, Annual #12; The Official Handbook of the Conan Universe (1986) #1	624	27 Sep 2022	Arthur Adams cover: 978-1302934347
8	Conan the Barbarian: The Original Marvel Years Vol. 8	1986-1988	Conan the Barbarian #195–213, Annual #12; The Official Handbook of the Conan Universe (1986) #1	624	27 Sep 2022	Geof Isherwood DM cover: 978-1302934354
9	Conan the Barbarian: The Original Marvel Years Vol. 9	1989-1990	Conan the Barbarian #214–240; material from What If? (1989) #16	704	22 Nov 2022	Jim Lee cover: 978-1302947255
9	Conan the Barbarian: The Original Marvel Years Vol. 9	1989-1990	Conan the Barbarian #214–240; material from What If? (1989) #16	704	22 Nov 2022	Michael Higgins DM cover: 978-1302947262
10	Conan the Barbarian: The Original Marvel Years Vol. 10	1991-1993	Conan the Barbarian #241–275; material from What The--?! (1988) #12	944	3 Jan 2023	Todd McFarlane cover: 978-1302947279
10	Conan the Barbarian: The Original Marvel Years Vol. 10	1991-1993	Conan the Barbarian #241–275; material from What The--?! (1988) #12	944	3 Jan 2023	Jim Lee DM cover: 978-1302947286

==== The Savage Sword of Conan: The Original Marvel Years ====
#	Title	Years covered	Material collected	Pages	Released	ISBN
1	The Savage Sword of Conan: The Original Marvel Years Vol. 1	1971-1976	Conan material from Savage Tales (1971) #1–5; Savage Sword of Conan (1974) #1–12; Special (1975) #1	1,072	2 Apr 2019	Gabriele Dell'Otto cover: 978-1787740860
1	The Savage Sword of Conan: The Original Marvel Years Vol. 1	1971-1976	Conan material from Savage Tales (1971) #1–5; Savage Sword of Conan (1974) #1–12; Special (1975) #1	1,072	2 Apr 2019	Boris Vallejo DM cover: 978-1302915339
2	The Savage Sword of Conan: The Original Marvel Years Vol. 2	1976-1978	Conan material from Savage Sword of Conan (1974) #13–28; Marvel Comics Super Special (1977) #2	944	19 Nov 2019	Simone Bianchi cover: 978-1302915162
2	The Savage Sword of Conan: The Original Marvel Years Vol. 2	1976-1978	Conan material from Savage Sword of Conan (1974) #13–28; Marvel Comics Super Special (1977) #2	944	19 Nov 2019	Jim Starlin DM cover: 978-1302915179
3	The Savage Sword of Conan: The Original Marvel Years Vol. 3	1978-1979	Conan material from Savage Sword of Conan (1974) #29–44; Marvel Comics Super Special (1977) #9	912	2 Jun 2020	Ryan Brown cover: 978-1302922429
3	The Savage Sword of Conan: The Original Marvel Years Vol. 3	1978-1979	Conan material from Savage Sword of Conan (1974) #29–44; Marvel Comics Super Special (1977) #9	912	2 Jun 2020	Earl Norem DM cover: 978-1302922436
4	The Savage Sword of Conan: The Original Marvel Years Vol. 4	1979-1980	Conan material from Savage Sword of Conan (1974) #45–60	976	8 Jan 2021	Adi Granov cover: 978-1302922443
4	The Savage Sword of Conan: The Original Marvel Years Vol. 4	1979-1980	Conan material from Savage Sword of Conan (1974) #45–60	976	8 Jan 2021	Earl Norem DM cover: 978-1302922450
5	The Savage Sword of Conan: The Original Marvel Years Vol. 5	1980-1981	Conan material from Savage Sword of Conan (1974) #61–72	768	7 Jul 2021	Mahmud Asrar cover: 978-1302926922
5	The Savage Sword of Conan: The Original Marvel Years Vol. 5	1980-1981	Conan material from Savage Sword of Conan (1974) #61–72	768	7 Jul 2021	David Mattingly DM cover: 978-1302926939
6	The Savage Sword of Conan: The Original Marvel Years Vol. 6	1981-1983	Conan material from Savage Sword of Conan (1974) #73–87, Marvel Comics Super Special (1977) #21	1,016	18 Jan 2022	Dan Panosian cover: 978-1302926946
6	The Savage Sword of Conan: The Original Marvel Years Vol. 6	1981-1983	Conan material from Savage Sword of Conan (1974) #73–87, Marvel Comics Super Special (1977) #21	1,016	18 Jan 2022	Joe Jusko DM cover: 978-1302926953
7	The Savage Sword of Conan: The Original Marvel Years Vol. 7	1983-1984	Conan material from Savage Sword of Conan (1974) #88–101	936	26 Apr 2022	Kevin Nowlan cover: 978-1302934309
7	The Savage Sword of Conan: The Original Marvel Years Vol. 7	1983-1984	Conan material from Savage Sword of Conan (1974) #88–101	936	26 Apr 2022	Bob Larkin DM cover: 978-1302934316
8	The Savage Sword of Conan: The Original Marvel Years Vol. 8	1984-1985	Conan material from Savage Sword of Conan (1974) #102–116, Marvel Comics Super Special (1977) #35	1,056	18 Oct 2022	Nic Klein cover: 978-1302934903
8	The Savage Sword of Conan: The Original Marvel Years Vol. 8	1984-1985	Conan material from Savage Sword of Conan (1974) #102–116, Marvel Comics Super Special (1977) #35	1,056	18 Oct 2022	Bill Sienkiewicz DM cover: 978-1302934910

==== Conan the King: The Original Marvel Years ====
#	Title	Years covered	Material collected	Pages	Released	ISBN
1	Conan the King: The Original Marvel Years Vol. 1	1980-1983	King Conan (1980) #1–19	776	16 Aug 2022	Kaare Andrews cover: 978-1302946654
1	Conan the King: The Original Marvel Years Vol. 1	1980-1983	King Conan (1980) #1–19	776	16 Aug 2022	John Buscema DM cover: 978-1302946661

==== Conan the Barbarian: The Dark Horse Years ====
#	Title	Years covered	Material collected	Pages	Released	ISBN
1	Conan the Barbarian by Kurt Busiek	2003-2007	Conan: The Legend #0; Conan (2004) #1–28, 32, 39, 45–46; Conan: Book of Thoth #1–4	1,024	18 Dec 2020	Cary Nord cover: 978-1302926533
1	Conan the Barbarian by Kurt Busiek	2003-2007	Conan: The Legend #0; Conan (2004) #1–28, 32, 39, 45–46; Conan: Book of Thoth #1–4	1,024	18 Dec 2020	Joseph Michael Linsner DM cover: 978-1302926540

=== Crossgen Universe ===
Crossgen was founded in 1998 and "quickly became one of the largest independent U.S. publishers of comics and graphic novels". By 2004, however, the company was "bought for a reported $1million at a bankruptcy auction by Cal Publishing Inc., a subsidiary of Disney".

When Marvel was also acquired by Disney in 2009, the rights to publish Crossgen titles fell to Marvel. Partly as an effort to maintain copyright, the company have been releasing Crossgen content as omnibuses since 2023.

#	Title	Years covered	Material collected	Pages	Released	ISBN
	Sigil	2000-2003	Sigil (2000) #1–42, CrossGen Chronicles (2000) #4, Saurians: Unnatural Selection (2002) #1–2; material from CrossGenesis (2000) #1, CrossGen Chronicles (2000) #1	1,192	19 Dec 2023	Claudio Castellini cover: 978-1302953508
	Sigil	2000-2003	Sigil (2000) #1–42, CrossGen Chronicles (2000) #4, Saurians: Unnatural Selection (2002) #1–2; material from CrossGenesis (2000) #1, CrossGen Chronicles (2000) #1	1,192	19 Dec 2023	Ben Lai DM cover: 978-1302953515
	Mystic	2000-2004	Mystic (2000) #1–43, Crossgen Chronicles (2000) #5, material from Crossgen Chronicles (2000) #1	1,152	13 Aug 2024	Brandon Peterson cover: 978-1302958770
	Mystic	2000-2004	Mystic (2000) #1–43, Crossgen Chronicles (2000) #5, material from Crossgen Chronicles (2000) #1	1,152	13 Aug 2024	Aaron Lopresti cover: 978-1302958787

=== The Dark Tower ===
Marvel held the rights to graphic adaptations of Stephen King's Dark Tower series from 2007.

The company produced five miniseries "detailing (gunslinger) Roland Deschain's early years, then adapted the Dark Tower novels themselves in a series of six books."

In 2018, the rights switched to publisher Gallery 13.

#	Title	Years covered	Material collected	Pages	Released	ISBN
1	The Dark Tower (Slipcase Edition)	2007-2010	The Dark Tower: The Gunslinger Born #1–7; The Dark Tower: The Long Road Home #1–5; The Dark Tower: Treachery #1–6; The Dark Tower: The Sorcerer #1; The Dark Tower: The Fall of Gilead #1–6; The Dark Tower: The Battle of Jericho Hill #1–5; The Dark Tower: Gunslinger's Guidebook; The Dark Tower: End-World Almanac; The Dark Tower: Guide to Gilead; Marvel Spotlight: The Dark Tower	896	21 Sep 2011	Richard Isanove & Jae Lee cover: 978-0785155416
2	The Dark Tower: The Gunslinger	2010-2013	The Journey Begins #1–5; The Little Sisters of Eluria #1–5; The Battle of Tull #1–5; The Way Station #1–5; The Man in Black #1–5; Sheemie's Tale #1–2; Evil Ground #1–2; So Fell Lord Perth #1	1,048	2 Sep 2014	Richard Isanove & Jae Lee cover: 978-0785188704

=== John Carter, Warlord of Mars ===
#	Title	Years covered	Material collected	Pages	Released	ISBN
	John Carter, Warlord of Mars	1977-1979	John Carter, Warlord of Mars #1–28, Annual #1–3	632	8 Feb 2012	Alan Davis cover: 978-0785159902
	John Carter, Warlord of Mars	1977-1979	John Carter, Warlord of Mars #1–28, Annual #1–3	632	8 Feb 2012	Gil Kane DM cover: 978-0785159919

=== Kull ===
#	Title	Years covered	Material collected	Pages	Released	ISBN
	Kull the Destroyer: The Original Marvel Years	1971-1978	Kull the Conqueror (1971) #1–10; Kull the Destroyer (1973) #11–29; material from Creatures on the Loose (1971) #10, Monsters on the Prowl (1971) #16, Kull and the Barbarians (1975) #1–3, Savage Sword of Conan (1974) #9 and Conan the Barbarian (1970) #10, Annual #3	784	2 Nov 2021	Paulo Siqueira cover: 978-1302929190
	Kull the Destroyer: The Original Marvel Years	1971-1978	Kull the Conqueror (1971) #1–10; Kull the Destroyer (1973) #11–29; material from Creatures on the Loose (1971) #10, Monsters on the Prowl (1971) #16, Kull and the Barbarians (1975) #1–3, Savage Sword of Conan (1974) #9 and Conan the Barbarian (1970) #10, Annual #3	784	2 Nov 2021	Mike Ploog DM cover: 978-1302929206
	Kull: Savage Sword – The Original Marvel Years	1971-1985	Kull material from Kull and the Barbarians (1975) #1–3; Savage Tales (1971) #2; Savage Sword of Conan (1974) #1–3, 7, 9, 14–16, 19, 23, 34, 39, 42–43, 52, 55, 61, 119–122, 124–141, #143–145, 147–152, 158–159, 161, 165, 169–170, 172–173, 177, 182–183, 186, 190–194, 196–199, 202, 213, 215, 229–233; Savage Tales Annual (1975) #1; Marvel Previews (1975) #19; Bizarre Adventures (1981) #26; Conan Saga (1987) #13, 25, 47, 57, 97	952	5 May 2021	Mark Brooks cover: 978-1302926809
	Kull: Savage Sword – The Original Marvel Years	1971-1985	Kull material from Kull and the Barbarians (1975) #1–3; Savage Tales (1971) #2; Savage Sword of Conan (1974) #1–3, 7, 9, 14–16, 19, 23, 34, 39, 42–43, 52, 55, 61, 119–122, 124–141, #143–145, 147–152, 158–159, 161, 165, 169–170, 172–173, 177, 182–183, 186, 190–194, 196–199, 202, 213, 215, 229–233; Savage Tales Annual (1975) #1; Marvel Previews (1975) #19; Bizarre Adventures (1981) #26; Conan Saga (1987) #13, 25, 47, 57, 97	952	5 May 2021	Michael Whelan DM cover: 978-1302926816
	Kull the Conqueror: The Original Marvel Years	1981-1989	Marvel Team-Up (1972) #111–112; Kull the Conqueror (1982) #1–2; Kull the Conqueror (1983) #1–10; Marvel Graphic Novel No. 47 – Kull: The Vale of Shadow (1989)	632	16 Nov 2021	David Lopez cover: 978-1302929176
	Kull the Conqueror: The Original Marvel Years	1981-1989	Marvel Team-Up (1972) #111–112; Kull the Conqueror (1982) #1–2; Kull the Conqueror (1983) #1–10; Marvel Graphic Novel No. 47 – Kull: The Vale of Shadow (1989)	632	16 Nov 2021	John Bolton DM cover: 978-1302929183

=== Miracleman ===
#	Title	Years covered	Material collected	Pages	Released	ISBN
	Miracleman	1982-2014	Material from Warrior (1982) #1–18, #20–21; Miracleman (1985) #1, 3, 6–16; Marvelman Special (1984) #1; material from A1 (1989) #1; All-New Miracleman Annual 2014	808	25 Oct 2022	Alan Davis cover: 978-1302947293
	Miracleman	1982-2014	Material from Warrior (1982) #1–18, #20–21; Miracleman (1985) #1, 3, 6–16; Marvelman Special (1984) #1; material from A1 (1989) #1; All-New Miracleman Annual 2014	808	25 Oct 2022	Kevin Nowlan DM cover: 978-1302947309
	Miracleman	1982-2014	Material from Warrior (1982) #1–18, #20–21; Miracleman (1985) #1, 3, 6–16; Marvelman Special (1984) #1; material from A1 (1989) #1; All-New Miracleman Annual 2014	808	25 Oct 2022	Garry Leach DM cover: 978-1302947316

=== The Muppets ===
The Muppets omnibus is branded as a "Disney Comics Omnibus".

#	Title	Years covered	Material collected	Pages	Released	ISBN
	The Muppets	2009-2012	The Muppet Show Comic Book: Meet the Muppets (2009) #1–4; The Muppet Show Comic Book: The Treasure of Peg-Leg Wilson #1–4; The Muppet Show Comic Book (ongoing series) #0–11; The Muppets (2012) #1–4	600	18 Mar 2014	Andrew Langridge cover: 978-0785187929
	The Muppets	2009-2012	The Muppet Show Comic Book: Meet the Muppets (2009) #1–4; The Muppet Show Comic Book: The Treasure of Peg-Leg Wilson #1–4; The Muppet Show Comic Book (ongoing series) #0–11; The Muppets (2012) #1–4	600	18 Mar 2014	Phil Noto DM cover: 978-0785187936
	Muppet Babies	1983-1989	Muppet Babies #1–26; Marvel Super Special #32	680	4 Oct 2017	Marie Severin cover: 978-1302908256
	Muppet Babies	1983-1989	Muppet Babies #1–26; Marvel Super Special #32	680	4 Oct 2017	Kermit DM cover: 978-1302908263

=== Oz ===
#	Title	Years covered	Material collected	Pages	Released	ISBN
	Oz	2008-2013	The Wonderful Wizard of Oz #1–8; The Marvelous Land of Oz #1–8; Ozma of Oz #1–8; Dorothy and the Wizard in Oz #1–8; Road to Oz #1–6; The Emerald City of Oz #1–5; Marvel Illustrated: Wizard of Oz Sketchbook; Oz Primer	1,080	2 Sep 2014	Skottie Young cover: 978-0785187837

=== Planet of the Apes ===
Following Fox's sale to Disney in 2020, Marvel Comics reacquired a series of publishing rights, including Alien, Predator, and Planet of the Apes.

As well as releasing new Planet of the Apes material, Marvel have republished full-color comics first produced by them in 1975.

#	Title	Years covered	Material collected	Pages	Released	ISBN
	Planet of the Apes Adventures: The Original Marvel Years	1975-1976	Adventures on the Planet of the Apes (1975) #1–11	224	18 Apr 2023	Erik Gist cover: 978-1302950736
	Planet of the Apes Adventures: The Original Marvel Years	1975-1976	Adventures on the Planet of the Apes (1975) #1–11	224	18 Apr 2023	Gil Kane DM cover: 978-1302950743

=== Powers ===
The Powers series was published by Image Comics between 2000 and 2004, before moving to Marvel's Icon label in 2004.

The omnibus, plus a series of other collected editions, were published between then and 2017, before writer Brian Michael Bendis signed a deal to republish the books with Dark Horse Comics in 2021.

#	Title	Years covered	Material collected	Pages	Released	ISBN
	Powers Vol. 1	2000-2004	Powers (2000) #1–37	1,296	28 Jul 2015	Michael Avon Oeming cover: 978-0785198277

=== Predator ===
Marvel Comics gained the rights to publish Predator comics from Dark Horse in 2021; however, a dispute with the film's screenwriters led to delays with release of new material.

The company solicited two Predator omnibuses, reprinting comics first published by Dark Horse; however, the second had material removed due to "racial concerns".

#	Title	Years covered	Material collected	Pages	Released	ISBN
1	Predator: The Original Years Vol. 1	1989-1997	Predator (1989) #1–4; Predator 2 #1–2; Predator: Big Game #1–4; Predator: Cold War #1–4; Predator: The Bloody Sands of Time #1–2; Predator: Bad Blood #1–4; Predator: Invaders from the Fourth Dimension; Predator: Dark River #1–4; Predator: Strange Roux; Predator: Kindred #1–4; material from Dark Horse Presents (1986) #46, 67–69, 119, Dark Horse Comics #1–2, 4–7, 10–14, 16–18, 20–21 and A Decade of Dark Horse #1 of 4	1,032	27 Dec 2022	Iban Coello cover: 978-1302928964
1	Predator: The Original Years Vol. 1	1989-1997	Predator (1989) #1–4; Predator 2 #1–2; Predator: Big Game #1–4; Predator: Cold War #1–4; Predator: The Bloody Sands of Time #1–2; Predator: Bad Blood #1–4; Predator: Invaders from the Fourth Dimension; Predator: Dark River #1–4; Predator: Strange Roux; Predator: Kindred #1–4; material from Dark Horse Presents (1986) #46, 67–69, 119, Dark Horse Comics #1–2, 4–7, 10–14, 16–18, 20–21 and A Decade of Dark Horse #1 of 4	1,032	27 Dec 2022	Chris Warner DM cover: 978-1302928971
2	Predator: The Original Years Vol. 2	1997-2020	Predator: Hell & Hot Water (1997) #1-3, Predator: Primal (1997) #1-2, Predator: Nemesis (1997) #1-2, Predator: Captive (1998) #1, Predator: Homeworld (1999) #1-4, Predator: Xenogenesis (1999) #1-4, Predator (2009) #1-4, Predators (2010) #1-4, Predators: Beating the Bullet (2010) #1, Predators: Preserve the Game (2010) #1, Predator: Hunters (2017) #1-5, Predator: Hunters II (2018) #1-4, Predator: Hunters III (2020) #1-4; material from Dark Horse Presents (1986) #124; Free Comic Book Day 2009: Predator	992	26 Mar 2024	InHyuk Lee cover: 978-1302928988
2	Predator: The Original Years Vol. 2	1997-2020		992	26 Mar 2024	Bob Eggleton DM cover: 978-1302928995

=== Solomon Kane ===
#	Title	Years covered	Material collected	Pages	Released	ISBN
	Solomon Kane: The Original Marvel Years	1973-1994	Marvel Premiere (1972) #33–34; Sword of Solomon Kane (1985) #1–6; material from Conan Saga (1987) #50, Dracula Lives! (1973) #3, Kull and the Barbarians (1975) #2–3, Marvel Preview (1975) #19, Monsters Unleashed (1973) #1 and Savage Sword of Conan (1974) #13–14, 18–20, 22, 25–26, 33–34, 37, 39, 41, 53–54, 62, 83, 162, 169, 171, 219–220	624	5 Aug 2020	Patrick Zircher cover: 978-1302925147
	Solomon Kane: The Original Marvel Years	1973-1994	Marvel Premiere (1972) #33–34; Sword of Solomon Kane (1985) #1–6; material from Conan Saga (1987) #50, Dracula Lives! (1973) #3, Kull and the Barbarians (1975) #2–3, Marvel Preview (1975) #19, Monsters Unleashed (1973) #1 and Savage Sword of Conan (1974) #13–14, 18–20, 22, 25–26, 33–34, 37, 39, 41, 53–54, 62, 83, 162, 169, 171, 219–220	624	5 Aug 2020	Howard Chaykin DM cover: 978-1302925611

=== The Stand ===
#	Title	Years covered	Material collected	Pages	Released	ISBN
	The Stand (two-book slipcase edition)	2008-2011	The Stand: Captain Trips #1–5; The Stand: American Nightmares #1–5; The Stand: Soul Survivors #1–5; The Stand: Hardcases #1–5; The Stand: No Man's Land #1–5; The Stand: The Night Has Come #1–5	768	4 Sep 2012	Mike Perkins & Laura Martin cover: 978-0785153313

=== Star Wars ===
Marvel's first 1977 comic was a six-issue adaptation of the original film. The series ran for 107 issues and three Annuals until 1986, featuring stories set between the original trilogy of films, as well as adaptations of The Empire Strikes Back and Return of the Jedi. Rights briefly went to Blackthorne Publishing, before being acquired by Dark Horse Comics. The company produced over 100 Star Wars titles until 2014.

Following the October 2012 acquisition of Lucasfilm by Disney, it was announced that the Star Wars comics license would return to Marvel Comics in 2015. In April 2014, Lucasfilm rebranded the majority of the Star Wars Expanded Universe as Legends, only keeping the theatrical Skywalker saga and the 2008 Clone Wars film and television series as canon.

Marvel's Senior Vice President of sales and marketing, David Gabriel, said the Star Wars releases would "be bouncing around to different periods of Star Wars history ... constructing one huge tapestry, collecting full unbroken runs of all the greatest Star Wars comics from the past 35 years."

==== The Original Marvel Years ====
#	Title	Years covered	Material collected	Pages	Released	ISBN
1	Star Wars: The Original Marvel Years Vol. 1	1977-1981	Star Wars #1–44, Annual #1	880	27 Jan 2015	Howard Chaykin cover: 978-0785191063
1	Star Wars: The Original Marvel Years Vol. 1	1977-1981	Star Wars #1–44, Annual #1	880	27 Jan 2015	Greg Hildebrandt DM cover: 978-0785193180
2	Star Wars: The Original Marvel Years Vol. 2	1981-1983	Star Wars #45–78, Annual #2	848	19 May 2015	Gene Day cover: 978-0785193425
2	Star Wars: The Original Marvel Years Vol. 2	1981-1983	Star Wars #45–78, Annual #2	848	19 May 2015	Greg Hildebrandt DM cover: 978-0785193432
3	Star Wars: The Original Marvel Years Vol. 3	1984-1986, 1979-1982	Star Wars #79–107, Annual #3; Return of the Jedi #1–4; material from Pizzazz #1–16, Star Wars Weekly (U.K.) #60, 94–99, 104–115, The Empire Strikes Back (U.K.) #149, 151, 153–157 and Star Wars (U.K.) #159	1,136	6 Oct 2015	Tom Palmer cover: 978-0785193463
3	Star Wars: The Original Marvel Years Vol. 3	1984-1986, 1979-1982	Star Wars #79–107, Annual #3; Return of the Jedi #1–4; material from Pizzazz #1–16, Star Wars Weekly (U.K.) #60, 94–99, 104–115, The Empire Strikes Back (U.K.) #149, 151, 153–157 and Star Wars (U.K.) #159	1,136	6 Oct 2015	Tim Hildebrandt DM cover: 978-0785193470
	Star Wars: The Marvel U.K. Collection	1979-1982	Star Wars Weekly (UK) #60, 94–99, 104–115; The Empire Strikes Back (UK) #149, 151, 153–157; Star Wars (UK) #159; Ewoks Annual 1989; Star Wars: The Official Collectors' Magazine; material from Pizzazz #10–16; UK exclusive covers, pin-ups and articles	808	19 Sep 2017	Tony DeZuniga cover: 978-1302908201
	Star Wars: Droids and Ewoks	1985-1987	Ewoks #1–14; Droids #1–8; Ewoks Annual 1989 (UK)	536	14 Jun 2016	Ernie Colon Droids cover: 978-1302900854
	Star Wars: Droids and Ewoks	1985-1987	Ewoks #1–14; Droids #1–8; Ewoks Annual 1989 (UK)	536	14 Jun 2016	Warren Kremer Ewoks DM cover: 978-1302901257

==== Star Wars Legends ====
#	Title	Years covered	Material collected	Pages	Released	ISBN
	Star Wars Legends: The Newspaper Strips	1979-1997	Classic Star Wars: The Early Adventures (1994) #1-9; Classic Star Wars: Han Solo At Stars' End (1997) #1-3; Classic Star Wars (1992) #1-20; Classic Star Wars: A New Hope (1994) #1-2; Classic Star Wars: The Vandelhelm Mission (1995); Star Wars newspaper strips: The Constancia Affair; The Kashyyyk Depths, Planet of Kadril	1,096	21 Jul 2026	Al Williamson Early Adventures cover: 978-1302968014
	Star Wars Legends: The Newspaper Strips	1979-1997	Classic Star Wars: The Early Adventures (1994) #1-9; Classic Star Wars: Han Solo At Stars' End (1997) #1-3; Classic Star Wars (1992) #1-20; Classic Star Wars: A New Hope (1994) #1-2; Classic Star Wars: The Vandelhelm Mission (1995); Star Wars newspaper strips: The Constancia Affair; The Kashyyyk Depths, Planet of Kadril	1,096	21 Jul 2026	Al Williamson Ord Mantell DM cover: 978-1302968021
	Star Wars Legends: Tales of the Jedi	1993-2014	Star Wars: Dawn of the Jedi – Force Storm (2012) #1–5; Star Wars: Dawn of the Jedi – Prisoner of Bogan (2012) #1–5; Star Wars: Dawn of the Jedi – Force War (2013) #1–5; Star Wars: Dawn of the Jedi (2012) #0; Star Wars: Tales of the Jedi – The Golden Age of the Sith (1996) #0–5; Star Wars: Tales of the Jedi – The Fall of the Sith Empire (1997) #1–5; Star Wars: Tales of the Jedi (1993) #1–5; Star Wars: Tales of the Jedi – The Freedom Nadd Uprising (1994) #1–2; Star Wars: Tales of the Jedi – Dark Lords of the Sith (1994) #1–6; Star Wars: Tales of the Jedi – The Sith War (1995) #1–6; Star Wars: Tales of the Jedi – Redemption (1998) #1–5; material from Star Wars Tales (1999) #23; Dark Horse Comics (1992) #7–9	1,336	2 Jul 2024	Dave Dorman Jabba cover: 978-1302953959
	Star Wars Legends: Tales of the Jedi	1993-2014		1,336	2 Jul 2024	Dave Dorman Ulic Qel-Droma DM cover: 978-1302953966
1	Star Wars Legends: The Old Republic Vol. 1	2006-2012	Star Wars: Knights of the Old Republic #1–50; Star Wars: Knights of the Old Republic – War #1–5; Star Wars: Knights of the Old Republic Handbook; material from Star Wars: Knights of the Old Republic/Rebellion #0	1,344	7 Jul 2021	Brian Ching cover: 978-1302930615
1	Star Wars Legends: The Old Republic Vol. 1	2006-2012	Star Wars: Knights of the Old Republic #1–50; Star Wars: Knights of the Old Republic – War #1–5; Star Wars: Knights of the Old Republic Handbook; material from Star Wars: Knights of the Old Republic/Rebellion #0	1,344	7 Jul 2021	Dustin Weaver DM cover: 978-1302930622
1	Star Wars Legends: The Old Republic Vol. 1	2006-2012	Star Wars: Knights of the Old Republic #1–50; Star Wars: Knights of the Old Republic – War #1–5; Star Wars: Knights of the Old Republic Handbook; material from Star Wars: Knights of the Old Republic/Rebellion #0	1,344	18 Mar 2025	Brian Ching cover: 978-1302961282
1	Star Wars Legends: The Old Republic Vol. 1	2006-2012	Star Wars: Knights of the Old Republic #1–50; Star Wars: Knights of the Old Republic – War #1–5; Star Wars: Knights of the Old Republic Handbook; material from Star Wars: Knights of the Old Republic/Rebellion #0	1,344	18 Mar 2025	Dustin Weaver DM cover: 978-1302961299
2	Star Wars Legends: The Old Republic Vol. 2	2011-2012	Star Wars: The Old Republic (2010) #1–6; Star Wars: The Old Republic - The Lost Sons (2010) #1–5; Star Wars: Lost Tribe of the Sith - Spiral #1-5; Star Wars: Knight Errant #1-5; Star Wars: Knight Errant - Deluge #1-5; Star Wars: Knight Errant - Escape #1-5; Star Wars: Jedi Vs. Sith (2001) #1-6; material from Star Wars Tales #16, 17, 24; Star Wars Visionaries	976	21 Oct 2025	Benjamin Carre cover: 978-1302965969
2	Star Wars Legends: The Old Republic Vol. 2	2011-2012	Star Wars: The Old Republic (2010) #1–6; Star Wars: The Old Republic - The Lost Sons (2010) #1–5; Star Wars: Lost Tribe of the Sith - Spiral #1-5; Star Wars: Knight Errant #1-5; Star Wars: Knight Errant - Deluge #1-5; Star Wars: Knight Errant - Escape #1-5; Star Wars: Jedi Vs. Sith (2001) #1-6; material from Star Wars Tales #16, 17, 24; Star Wars Visionaries	976	21 Oct 2025	Joe Quinones DM cover: 978-1302966027
	Star Wars Legends: Rise of the Sith	1998-2011	Star Wars: Jedi – The Dark Side #1–5; Star Wars: Qui-Gon & Obi-Wan – The Aurorient Express #1–2; Star Wars: Qui-Gon & Obi-Wan – Last Stand on Ord Mantell #1–3; Star Wars: Jedi Council – Acts of War #1–4; Star Wars (1998) #0–6; Star Wars: Darth Maul (2000) #1–4; Star Wars: Episode I - The Phantom Menace #1/2 and #1–4; Star Wars: Episode I - Anakin Skywalker, Queen Amidala, Qui-Gon Jinn and Obi-Wan Kenobi; material from Star Wars Tales #1, 3, 5, 7, 9–10, 13–14, 20, 24	1,000	29 Sep 2021	Ramon Bachs Jedis cover: 978-1302932091
	Star Wars Legends: Rise of the Sith	1998-2011	Star Wars: Jedi – The Dark Side #1–5; Star Wars: Qui-Gon & Obi-Wan – The Aurorient Express #1–2; Star Wars: Qui-Gon & Obi-Wan – Last Stand on Ord Mantell #1–3; Star Wars: Jedi Council – Acts of War #1–4; Star Wars (1998) #0–6; Star Wars: Darth Maul (2000) #1–4; Star Wars: Episode I - The Phantom Menace #1/2 and #1–4; Star Wars: Episode I - Anakin Skywalker, Queen Amidala, Qui-Gon Jinn and Obi-Wan Kenobi; material from Star Wars Tales #1, 3, 5, 7, 9–10, 13–14, 20, 24	1,000	29 Sep 2021	Hugh Fleming Darth Maul DM cover: 978-1302932107
1	Star Wars Legends: Menace Revealed Vol. 1	1999-2002	Star Wars: Jango Fett – Open Seasons #1-4; Star Wars (1998) #7-35; material from Star Wars Tales #8, 13, 21-24; Dark Horse Extra #35-37; Dark Horse Presents Annual 2000	920	22 Dec 2026	Jan Duursema cover: 978-1302969660
1	Star Wars Legends: Menace Revealed Vol. 1	1999-2002	Star Wars: Jango Fett – Open Seasons #1-4; Star Wars (1998) #7-35; material from Star Wars Tales #8, 13, 21-24; Dark Horse Extra #35-37; Dark Horse Presents Annual 2000	920	22 Dec 2026	Ramón Bachs DM cover: TBC
1	Star Wars Legends: The Clone Wars Vol. 1	2003-2012	Star Wars: Republic #49-67; Star Wars: Jedi – Mace Windu; Star Wars: Jedi – Shaak Ti; Star Wars: Jedi – Aayla Secura; Star Wars: Jedi – Count Dooku; Star Wars: Jedi – Yoda; Star Wars: Darth Maul – Death Sentence #1-4; material from Star Wars Tales #14, 19, 22; Star Wars Visionaries	848	19 Jan 2027	Jan Duursema cover: 978-1302969646
1	Star Wars Legends: The Clone Wars Vol. 1	2003-2012	Star Wars: Republic #49-67; Star Wars: Jedi – Mace Windu; Star Wars: Jedi – Shaak Ti; Star Wars: Jedi – Aayla Secura; Star Wars: Jedi – Count Dooku; Star Wars: Jedi – Yoda; Star Wars: Darth Maul – Death Sentence #1-4; material from Star Wars Tales #14, 19, 22; Star Wars Visionaries	848	19 Jan 2027	Dave Dorman DM cover: TBC
1	Star Wars Legends: The Empire Vol. 1	2005-2013	Star Wars: Republic #78–80; Star Wars: Purge; Star Wars: Purge – Seconds to Die; Star Wars: Purge – The Hidden Blade; Star Wars: Purge – The Tyrant's Fist #1–2; Star Wars: Darth Vader and the Lost Command #1–5; Star Wars: Dark Times #1–17, Star Wars: Dark Times – Blue Harvest #0; Star Wars: Dark Times – Out of the Wilderness #1–5; Star Wars: Darth Vader and the Ghost Prison #1–5	992	3 May 2022	Tsuneo Sanda cover: 978-1302934187
1	Star Wars Legends: The Empire Vol. 1	2005-2013	Star Wars: Republic #78–80; Star Wars: Purge; Star Wars: Purge – Seconds to Die; Star Wars: Purge – The Hidden Blade; Star Wars: Purge – The Tyrant's Fist #1–2; Star Wars: Darth Vader and the Lost Command #1–5; Star Wars: Dark Times #1–17, Star Wars: Dark Times – Blue Harvest #0; Star Wars: Dark Times – Out of the Wilderness #1–5; Star Wars: Darth Vader and the Ghost Prison #1–5	992	3 May 2022	Dave Wilkins DM cover: 978-1302934187
2	Star Wars Legends: The Empire Vol. 2	1994-2014	Star Wars: Dark Times – Fire Carrier #1–5; Star Wars: Dark Times – A Spark Remains #1–5; Star Wars: Darth Vader and the Ninth Assassin #1–5; Star Wars: Darth Vader and the Cry of Shadows #1–5; Star Wars: Droids (1994) #1–6, Special; Star Wars: Droids (1995) #1–8; Star Wars: The Protocol Offensive #1; material from Star Wars Visionaries; Star Wars Tales #11-12, 15, 20; Dark Horse Presents Annual '99; Star Wars Galaxy Magazine #1	1,032	31 Oct 2023	Felipe Massafera cover: 978-1302951719
2	Star Wars Legends: The Empire Vol. 2	1994-2014	Star Wars: Dark Times – Fire Carrier #1–5; Star Wars: Dark Times – A Spark Remains #1–5; Star Wars: Darth Vader and the Ninth Assassin #1–5; Star Wars: Darth Vader and the Cry of Shadows #1–5; Star Wars: Droids (1994) #1–6, Special; Star Wars: Droids (1995) #1–8; Star Wars: The Protocol Offensive #1; material from Star Wars Visionaries; Star Wars Tales #11-12, 15, 20; Dark Horse Presents Annual '99; Star Wars Galaxy Magazine #1	1,032	31 Oct 2023	Killian Plunkett DM cover: 978-1302951726
3	Star Wars Legends: The Empire Vol. 3	1995-2012	Star Wars: Jabba the Hutt - The Gaarr Suppoon Hit #1, Star Wars: Jabba the Hutt - The Hunger of Princess Nampi #1, Star Warrs: Jabba the Hutt - The Dynasty Trap #1, Star Wars: Jabba the Hutt - Betrayal #1, Free Comic Book Day 2012: Star Wars, Star Wars: Boba Fett - Enemy of the Empire #1-4, Star Wars: Agent of the Empire - Iron Eclipse #1-5, Star Wars: Agent of the Empire - Hard Targets #1-5, Star Wars: The Force Unleashed, Star Wars: The Force Unleashed II, Star Wars: Blood Ties #1-4, Star Wars: Blood Ties - Boba Fett is Dead #1-4, Star Wars: Empire #1-4; material from Star Wars Tales #7, 11, 15-16, 18-20; A Decade of Dark Horse #2	1,056	24 Dec 2024	Ken Kelly cover: 978-1302959791
3	Star Wars Legends: The Empire Vol. 3	1995-2012		1,056	24 Dec 2024	Chris Scalf DM cover: 978-1302959807
4	Star Wars Legends: The Empire Vol. 4	2000-2013	Star Wars: Underworld - The Yavin Vassilikka #1-5; FCBD 2013: Star Wars; Star Wars: Empire #5-6, 8-13, 15; Star Wars: X-Wing Rogue Squadron ½; Star Wars: A New Hope - The Special Edition #1-4; Star Wars: Tag and Blink Are Dead; Star Wars Infinities: A New Hope #1-4; The Star Wars #0-8; material from Star Wars Tales #1-2, 4, 6, 8-10, 12, 14, 16, 19-20	1,048	17 Mar 2026	Douglas Wheatley cover: 978-1302965921
4	Star Wars Legends: The Empire Vol. 4	2000-2013	Star Wars: Underworld - The Yavin Vassilikka #1-5; FCBD 2013: Star Wars; Star Wars: Empire #5-6, 8-13, 15; Star Wars: X-Wing Rogue Squadron ½; Star Wars: A New Hope - The Special Edition #1-4; Star Wars: Tag and Blink Are Dead; Star Wars Infinities: A New Hope #1-4; The Star Wars #0-8; material from Star Wars Tales #1-2, 4, 6, 8-10, 12, 14, 16, 19-20	1,048	17 Mar 2026	Nick Runge DM cover: 978-1302965938
1	Star Wars Legends: The Rebellion Vol. 1	1977-2014	Star Wars: Empire #7, 14, 16–27; Star Wars: Vader's Quest #1–4; Star Wars (2013) #1–20; Star Wars (1997) #1–11, 12 (A-story), 13–20; Star Wars 3-D #1–3	1,072	14 Mar 2023	Ryan Benjamin Millennium Falcon cover: 978-1302947446
1	Star Wars Legends: The Rebellion Vol. 1	1977-2014	Star Wars: Empire #7, 14, 16–27; Star Wars: Vader's Quest #1–4; Star Wars (2013) #1–20; Star Wars (1997) #1–11, 12 (A-story), 13–20; Star Wars 3-D #1–3	1,072	14 Mar 2023	Hugh Fleming Luke Skywalker DM cover: 978-1302947453
2	Star Wars Legends: The Rebellion Vol. 2	1995-2008	Star Wars: River of Chaos #1–4; Star Wars: Empire #28–40; Star Wars: Rebellion #1–16; Star Wars: Boba Fett – Overkill #1; Star Wars: Boba Fett (1997) #1/2; Star Wars: Splinter of the Mind's Eye #1–4; material from Star Wars: Knights of the Old Republic/Rebellion #0 and Star Wars Tales #3, 15, 17, 21	1,024	14 May 2024	Tommy Lee Edwards Luke & Leia cover: 978-1302953935
2	Star Wars Legends: The Rebellion Vol. 2	1995-2008	Star Wars: River of Chaos #1–4; Star Wars: Empire #28–40; Star Wars: Rebellion #1–16; Star Wars: Boba Fett – Overkill #1; Star Wars: Boba Fett (1997) #1/2; Star Wars: Splinter of the Mind's Eye #1–4; material from Star Wars: Knights of the Old Republic/Rebellion #0 and Star Wars Tales #3, 15, 17, 21	1,024	14 May 2024	Joe Corroney Luke & Vader DM cover: 978-1302953942
3	Star Wars Legends: The Rebellion Vol. 3	1994-2014	Star Wars: Shadow Stalker (1997) #1, Star Wars: Rebel Heist (2014) #1–4, Star Wars: A Valentine Story (2003) #1, Classic Star Wars: The Empire Strikes Back (1994) #1–2, Star Wars: Shadows of the Empire (1996) #1–6, Star Wars: Shadows of the Empire Minicomic (1996) #1–2, Star Wars: Tales from Mos Eisley (1996) #1, Star Wars: The Bounty Hunters – Scoundrel's Wages (1999) #1, Classic Star Wars: Return of the Jedi (1994) #1–2, Star Wars: Tag & Bink Are Dead (2001) #2, Star Wars: Tag & Bink II (2006) #1, Sergio Aragones Stomps Star Wars (2000) #1, Star Wars Infinities: The Empire Strikes Back (2002) #1–4, Star Wars Infinities: Return of the Jedi (2003) #1–4; material from Star Wars Kids (1997) #12, Star Wars Visionaries (2005) and Star Wars Tales (1999) #2, 4–8, 10, 12, 15–17, 20	1,032	17 Jun 2025	Hugh Fleming Luke cover: 978-1302964177
3	Star Wars Legends: The Rebellion Vol. 3	1994-2014		1,032	17 Jun 2025	Hugh Fleming Leia DM cover: 978-1302964184
1	Star Wars Legends: The New Republic Vol. 1	1995-2005	Star Wars: Mara Jade – By the Emperor's Hand #0–6; Star Wars: Shadows of the Empire – Evolution #1–5; Star Wars: X-Wing Rogue Leader #1–3; Star Wars: X-Wing Rogue Squadron #1–35; Star Wars: X-Wing Rogue Squadron Special #1; Star Wars Handbook (1998) #1; material from Star Wars Tales #10, 12, 15, 23	1,304	24 Jan 2023	Mathieu Lauffray Chewbacca cover: 978-1302946470
1	Star Wars Legends: The New Republic Vol. 1	1995-2005	Star Wars: Mara Jade – By the Emperor's Hand #0–6; Star Wars: Shadows of the Empire – Evolution #1–5; Star Wars: X-Wing Rogue Leader #1–3; Star Wars: X-Wing Rogue Squadron #1–35; Star Wars: X-Wing Rogue Squadron Special #1; Star Wars Handbook (1998) #1; material from Star Wars Tales #10, 12, 15, 23	1,304	24 Jan 2023	Gary Erskine X-Wing DM cover: 978-1302946487
2	Star Wars Legends: The New Republic Vol. 2	1991-2005	Star Wars: The Jabba Tape (1998) #1; Star Wars: Heir to the Empire (1995) #1–6; Star Wars: Dark Force Rising (1997) #1–6; Star Wars: The Last Command (1997) #1–6; Star Wars: Dark Empire (1991) #1–6; Star Wars: Dark Empire II (1994) #1–6; Star Wars: Empire's End (1995) #1–2; Star Wars: Boba Fett – Twin Engines of Destruction (1997) #1; Star Wars: Boba Fett – Bounty on Bar-Kooda (1995) #1, Star Wars: Boba Fett – When the Fat Lady Sings (1996) #2, Star Wars: Boba Fett – Murder Most Foul (1997) #3; Star Wars: Boba Fett – Agent of Doom (2000) #1; Star Wars Handbook (1998) #3; material from Star Wars Tales (1998) #1, 3–5, 10, 14, 20, 22	1,312	11 Jun 2024	Dave Dorman Heroes cover: 978-1302951795
2	Star Wars Legends: The New Republic Vol. 2	1991-2005		1,312	11 Jun 2024	Dave Dorman Villains DM cover: 978-1302951801
3	Star Wars Legends: The New Republic Vol. 3	1997-2011	Star Wars: Crimson Empire #0-6; Star Wars: The Bounty Hunters - Kenix Kil; Star Wars: Crimson Empire II - Council of Blood #1-6; Star Wars: Crimson Empire III - Empire Lost #1-6; Star Wars: Jedi Academy - Leviathan #1-4; Star Wars: The Mixed-Up Droid; Star Wars: Union #1-4; Star Wars: Chewbacca #1-4; Star Wars: Invasion #0-5; Star Wars: Invasion - Rescues #1-6; Star Wars: Invasion - Revelations #1-5; Star Wars Handbook #2; material from Dark Horse Extra #21-24; Dark Horse Presents (2011); Star Wars Tales #8, 11, 16-19	1,344	16 Jun 2026	Dave Dorman Crimson Empire cover: 978-1302965945
3	Star Wars Legends: The New Republic Vol. 3	1997-2011		1,344	16 Jun 2026	Dave Dorman Empire Lost DM cover: 978-1302965952
1	Star Wars Legends: Legacy Vol. 1	2006-2009	Star Wars: Legacy (2006) #0, ½, 1-36, 41	928	19 May 2026	Jan Duursema Cover cover: 978-1302968557
1	Star Wars Legends: Legacy Vol. 1	2006-2009	Star Wars: Legacy (2006) #0, ½, 1-36, 41	928	19 May 2026	Travis Charest DM cover: 978-1302968564

==== Star Wars (canon) ====
#	Title	Years covered	Material collected	Pages	Released	ISBN
I	Star Wars: The High Republic - Light of the Jedi	2021-2022	Star Wars: The High Republic (2021) #1–15; Star Wars: The High Republic – Eye of the Storm (2022) #1–2; Star Wars: The High Republic – Trail of Shadows (2021) #1–5	544	17 Dec 2023	Phil Noto cover: 978-0785194880
I	Star Wars: The High Republic - Light of the Jedi	2021-2022	Star Wars: The High Republic (2021) #1–15; Star Wars: The High Republic – Eye of the Storm (2022) #1–2; Star Wars: The High Republic – Trail of Shadows (2021) #1–5	544	17 Dec 2023	Ario Anindito DM cover: 978-0785194897
II	Star Wars: The High Republic - Quest of the Jedi	2022-2023	Star Wars: The High Republic (2022) #1-10; Star Wars: The High Republic - The Blade (2022) #1-4	360	12 Nov 2024	Phil Noto cover: 978-1302958497
II	Star Wars: The High Republic - Quest of the Jedi	2022-2023	Star Wars: The High Republic (2022) #1-10; Star Wars: The High Republic - The Blade (2022) #1-4	360	12 Nov 2024	Marc Laming DM cover: 978-1302958503
III	Star Wars: The High Republic - Trials of the Jedi	2023-2025	Star Wars: The High Republic (2023) #1-10, Star Wars: The Acolyte - Kelnacca; Star Wars: The High Republic - Shadows of Starlight #1-4; Star Wars: The High Republic - Fear of the Jedi #1-5; Star Wars: The High Republic - The Finale; material from Star Wars: Revelations (2023)	528	21 Apr 2026	Phil Noto cover: 978-1302961329
III	Star Wars: The High Republic - Trials of the Jedi	2023-2025	Star Wars: The High Republic (2023) #1-10, Star Wars: The Acolyte - Kelnacca; Star Wars: The High Republic - Shadows of Starlight #1-4; Star Wars: The High Republic - Fear of the Jedi #1-5; Star Wars: The High Republic - The Finale; material from Star Wars: Revelations (2023)	528	21 Apr 2026	Giuseppe Camuncoli DM cover: 978-1302961336
	Star Wars by Jason Aaron	2015-2017	Star Wars (2015) #1–37; Star Wars: Vader Down #1; Darth Vader (2015) #13–15; Star Wars: Doctor Aphra (2016) #7–8; Star Wars: The Screaming Citadel #1; Star Wars Annual #1–3	1,296	12 Mar 2019	John Cassaday cover: 978-1302915377
	Star Wars by Jason Aaron	2015-2017	Star Wars (2015) #1–37; Star Wars: Vader Down #1; Darth Vader (2015) #13–15; Star Wars: Doctor Aphra (2016) #7–8; Star Wars: The Screaming Citadel #1; Star Wars Annual #1–3	1,296	3 May 2022	John Cassaday cover: 978-1302934095
	Star Wars by Jason Aaron	2015-2017	Star Wars (2015) #1–37; Star Wars: Vader Down #1; Darth Vader (2015) #13–15; Star Wars: Doctor Aphra (2016) #7–8; Star Wars: The Screaming Citadel #1; Star Wars Annual #1–3	1,296	3 May 2022	Stuart Immonen DM cover: 978-1302934293
	Star Wars by Jason Aaron	2015-2017	Star Wars (2015) #1–37; Star Wars: Vader Down #1; Darth Vader (2015) #13–15; Star Wars: Doctor Aphra (2016) #7–8; Star Wars: The Screaming Citadel #1; Star Wars Annual #1–3	1,296	3 May 2022	Mark Brooks DM cover: 978-1302934101
	Star Wars by Gillen & Pak	2017-2020	Star Wars (2015) #38–75, Star Wars Annual (2016) #4, Star Wars: Empire Ascendant (2019) #1	1,000	23 Apr 2024	Phil Noto cover: 978-1302955908
	Star Wars by Gillen & Pak	2017-2020	Star Wars (2015) #38–75, Star Wars Annual (2016) #4, Star Wars: Empire Ascendant (2019) #1	1,000	23 Apr 2024	Pepe Larraz DM cover: 978-1302955915
	Star Wars: Darth Vader by Kieron Gillen and Salvador Larroca (Original Trilogy Era)	2015-2016	Darth Vader (2015) #1–25, Annual #1; Star Wars: Vader Down #1; Star Wars #13–14	736	19 Sep 2017	Kaare Andrews cover: 978-1302908218
	Star Wars: Darth Vader by Kieron Gillen and Salvador Larroca (Original Trilogy Era)	2015-2016	Darth Vader (2015) #1–25, Annual #1; Star Wars: Vader Down #1; Star Wars #13–14	736	26 Apr 2022	Kaare Andrews cover: 978-1302934040
	Star Wars: Darth Vader by Kieron Gillen and Salvador Larroca (Original Trilogy Era)	2015-2016	Darth Vader (2015) #1–25, Annual #1; Star Wars: Vader Down #1; Star Wars #13–14	736	26 Apr 2022	Alex Ross DM cover: 978-1302934057
	Star Wars: Darth Vader by Charles Soule (Prequel Trilogy Era)	2017-2018	Darth Vader (2017, a.k.a. Dark Lord of the Sith) #1–25, Annual #2	624	21 Dec 2021	Mike Deodato Jr. cover: 978-1302931735
	Star Wars: Darth Vader by Charles Soule (Prequel Trilogy Era)	2017-2018	Darth Vader (2017, a.k.a. Dark Lord of the Sith) #1–25, Annual #2	624	21 Dec 2021	Giuseppe Camuncoli DM cover: 978-1302931742
	Star Wars: Kanan (branded as Omnibus internally but not externally)	2015-2016	Kanan - The Last Padawan #1-5; Kanan #6-12	272	20 Dec 2016	Mark Brooks cover: 978-1302902223
1	Star Wars: Doctor Aphra Vol. 1	2015-2019	Star Wars: Doctor Aphra (2016) #1–40, Annual #1–3; Darth Vader (2015) #3–4, 8, 21; Star Wars (2015) #13, 19, 31–32; Star Wars: The Screaming Citadel; material from Darth Vader (2015) #25 and Star Wars: Empire Ascendant	1,240	24 Feb 2021	Ashley Witter cover: 978-1302928438
1	Star Wars: Doctor Aphra Vol. 1	2015-2019	Star Wars: Doctor Aphra (2016) #1–40, Annual #1–3; Darth Vader (2015) #3–4, 8, 21; Star Wars (2015) #13, 19, 31–32; Star Wars: The Screaming Citadel; material from Darth Vader (2015) #25 and Star Wars: Empire Ascendant	1,240	24 Feb 2021	Rod Reis DM cover: 978-1302928445
1	Star Wars: Doctor Aphra Vol. 1	2015-2019	Star Wars: Doctor Aphra (2016) #1–40, Annual #1–3; Darth Vader (2015) #3–4, 8, 21; Star Wars (2015) #13, 19, 31–32; Star Wars: The Screaming Citadel; material from Darth Vader (2015) #25 and Star Wars: Empire Ascendant	1,240	31 Jan 2023	Ashley Witter cover: 978-1302947941
1	Star Wars: Doctor Aphra Vol. 1	2015-2019	Star Wars: Doctor Aphra (2016) #1–40, Annual #1–3; Darth Vader (2015) #3–4, 8, 21; Star Wars (2015) #13, 19, 31–32; Star Wars: The Screaming Citadel; material from Darth Vader (2015) #25 and Star Wars: Empire Ascendant	1,240	31 Jan 2023	Rod Reis DM cover: 978-1302947958
2	Star Wars: Doctor Aphra Vol. 2	2020-2022	Star Wars: Doctor Aphra (2020) #1–25	560	29 Aug 2023	Valentina Remenar cover: 978-1302949990
2	Star Wars: Doctor Aphra Vol. 2	2020-2022	Star Wars: Doctor Aphra (2020) #1–25	560	29 Aug 2023	Joshua Swaby "Sway" DM cover: 978-1302950002
3	Star Wars: Doctor Aphra: Friends & Enemies	2022-2024	Star Wars: Doctor Aphra (2020) #26–40; Star Wars Revelations (Aphra story); Star Wars: Sana Starros #1-5	472	2 Dec 2025	Jung-Geun Yoon cover: 978-1302961305
3	Star Wars: Doctor Aphra: Friends & Enemies	2022-2024	Star Wars: Doctor Aphra (2020) #26–40; Star Wars Revelations (Aphra story); Star Wars: Sana Starros #1-5	472	2 Dec 2025	Betsy Cola DM cover: 978-1302961312
	Star Wars: War of the Bounty Hunters	2021	Star Wars: War of the Bounty Hunters Alpha; Star Wars: War of the Bounty Hunters #1–5; Star Wars: War of the Bounty Hunters – Jabba the Hutt, 4-LOM & Zuckess, Boushh and IG-88; Star Wars (2020) #13–18; Star Wars: Bounty Hunters #12–17; Star Wars: Darth Vader (2020) #12–17; and Star Wars: Doctor Aphra (2020) #10–15	848	13 Dec 2022	Steve McNiven cover: 978-1302947835
	Star Wars: War of the Bounty Hunters	2021	Star Wars: War of the Bounty Hunters Alpha; Star Wars: War of the Bounty Hunters #1–5; Star Wars: War of the Bounty Hunters – Jabba the Hutt, 4-LOM & Zuckess, Boushh and IG-88; Star Wars (2020) #13–18; Star Wars: Bounty Hunters #12–17; Star Wars: Darth Vader (2020) #12–17; and Star Wars: Doctor Aphra (2020) #10–15	848	13 Dec 2022	Leinil Francis Yu DM cover: 978-1302947835
	Star Wars: Crimson Reign	2021-2022	Star Wars: Crimson Reign (2021) #1–5, Star Wars (2020) #19–25, Star Wars: Bounty Hunters (2020) #18–26, Star Wars: Darth Vader (2020) #18–27, Star Wars: Doctor Aphra (2020) #16–21	744	8 Apr 2025	Leinil Francis Yu cover: 978-1302961848
	Star Wars: Crimson Reign	2021-2022	Star Wars: Crimson Reign (2021) #1–5, Star Wars (2020) #19–25, Star Wars: Bounty Hunters (2020) #18–26, Star Wars: Darth Vader (2020) #18–27, Star Wars: Doctor Aphra (2020) #16–21	744	8 Apr 2025	Rod Reis DM cover: 978-1302961855
	Star Wars: Hidden Empire	2022-2023	Star Wars: Hidden Empire #1-5; Star Wars (2020) #26-36; Star Wars: Bounty Hunters #27-36; Star Wars: Darth Vader (2020) #28-36; Star Wars: Doctor Aphra (2020) #22-34; Star Wars: Revelations	1,000	17 Feb 2026	Paulo Siqueira cover: 978-1302961886
	Star Wars: Hidden Empire	2022-2023	Star Wars: Hidden Empire #1-5; Star Wars (2020) #26-36; Star Wars: Bounty Hunters #27-36; Star Wars: Darth Vader (2020) #28-36; Star Wars: Doctor Aphra (2020) #22-34; Star Wars: Revelations	1,000	17 Feb 2026	Declan Shalvey DM cover: 978-1302961893
	Star Wars: Dark Droids	2023	Star Wars: Dark Droids #1-5; Star Wars: Dark Droids – D-Squad #1-4; Star Wars (2020) #37-50; Star Wars: Bounty Hunters #37-42; Star Wars: Darth Vader (2020) #37-50; Star Wars: Doctor Aphra (2020) #35-40; Star Wars: Revelations; FCBD 2024: Star Wars	1,320	18 Aug 2026	Leinil Yu cover: 978-1302961862
	Star Wars: Dark Droids	2023	Star Wars: Dark Droids #1-5; Star Wars: Dark Droids – D-Squad #1-4; Star Wars (2020) #37-50; Star Wars: Bounty Hunters #37-42; Star Wars: Darth Vader (2020) #37-50; Star Wars: Doctor Aphra (2020) #35-40; Star Wars: Revelations; FCBD 2024: Star Wars	1,320	18 Aug 2026	Pete Woods DM cover: 978-1302961879
	Star Wars: Poe Dameron	2016-2018	Star Wars: Poe Dameron #1-31; Annual #1-2	792	8 Sep 2026	Phil Noto cover: 978-1302955878
	Star Wars: Poe Dameron	2016-2018	Star Wars: Poe Dameron #1-31; Annual #1-2	792	8 Sep 2026	Rod Reis DM cover: 978-1302955885

=== Ultraman ===
Title	Years covered	Material collected	Pages	Released	ISBN
Ultraman	1993-2024	The Rise of Ultraman (2020) #1-5; The Trials of Ultraman (2021) #1-5; Ultraman: The Mystery of Ultraseven (2022) #1-5; Ultraman X the Avengers (2024) #1-4; Ultraman (1993) #1-3; Ultraman (1994) #-1, 1-4	800	14 Jul 2026	Ed McGuinness 60th Anniversary cover: 978-1302967482
Ultraman	1993-2024	The Rise of Ultraman (2020) #1-5; The Trials of Ultraman (2021) #1-5; Ultraman: The Mystery of Ultraseven (2022) #1-5; Ultraman X the Avengers (2024) #1-4; Ultraman (1993) #1-3; Ultraman (1994) #-1, 1-4	800	14 Jul 2026	Peach Momoko DM cover: 978-1302967499

== Creator omnibuses ==
Outside of books dedicated to certain characters or storylines, Marvel also produces omnibuses for specific writers or artists. Some contain material from company archives; others – like Brian Michael Bendis: Crime Noir – reproduce work owned by the creator themselves.

=== Arthur Adams ===
#	Title	Years covered	Material collected	Pages	Released	ISBN
	Marvel Universe by Arthur Adams	1985-1991	Longshot (1985) #1–6; New Mutants Special Edition (1985) #1; X-Men Annual (1970) #9–10; Cloak and Dagger (1985) #9; X-Factor (1986) #41–42; Excalibur: Mojo Mayhem (1990); Fantastic Four (1961) #347–349; material from Web of Spider-Man Annual #2, X-Men Annual (1970) #12, 14; Fantastic Four (1961) #358; Marvel Holiday Special (1991) #1; covers from Classic X-Men (1986) #1–10, 12–16, 18–23; Official Handbook of the Marvel Universe (1985) and Marvel Universe Series I (1990) and Marvel Universe Series II (1991) trading cards	1,200	5 Dec 2023	Arthur Adams Earth cover: 978-1302950156
	Marvel Universe by Arthur Adams	1985-1991		1,200	5 Dec 2023	Arthur Adams Cosmic cover: 978-1302950163

=== Brian Michael Bendis ===
#	Title	Years covered	Material collected	Pages	Released	ISBN
	Brian Michael Bendis: Crime Noir	1993-1999	A.K.A. Goldfish: Ace, Jack, Queen, King and Joker; Jinx #1–5; Fire #1–2; Jinx: Torso #1–6	1,152	14 Jun 2017	Brian Michael Bendis cover: 978-1302901592

=== John Byrne ===
#	Title	Years covered	Material collected	Pages	Released	ISBN
1	Marvel Universe by John Byrne Vol. 1	1976-1990	Champions #11–15; Marvel Preview #11; Avengers (1963) #164–166, 181–191; Power Man and Iron Fist #48–50; Marvel Premiere #47–48; Captain America (1968) #247–255; Silver Surfer (1982) #1; Incredible Hulk (1968) #314–319; Wolverine (1988) #17–23; Marvel Fanfare (1982) #29	1,120	5 Apr 2016	978-0785195603
2	Marvel Universe by John Byrne Vol. 2	1975-1999	Marvel Premiere #25; Iron Fist (1975) #1–15; Marvel Team-Up (1972) #63–64, 100 (B-story); Marvel Chillers #6; Daredevil (1964) #138; Ghost Rider (1973) #20; The Champions (1975) #17; Incredible Hulk Annual #7; Iron Man (1968) #118; Marvel Two-in-One (1974) #43, 50, 53–55; Avengers Annual #13; Marvel Graphic Novel (1982) No. 18 – The Sensational She-Hulk; Star Brand #11–13, 19; New Mutants (1983) #75; Marvel: The Lost Generation #12–1; material from Giant-Size Dracula #5, Bizarre Adventures #31, Captain America (1968) #350, X-Factor Annual #4, Marvel Comics Presents (1988) #79 and Hulk (1999) #1	1,296	18 Dec 2018	978-1302914011

=== Donny Cates ===
#	Title	Years covered	Material collected	Pages	Released	ISBN
1	Marvel Cosmic Universe by Donny Cates Vol. 1	2017-2019	Thanos (2016) #13–18, Annual (2018) #1; Cosmic Ghost Rider (2018) #1–5; Death of the Inhumans (2018) #1–5; Silver Surfer: Black (2019) #1–5; Thanos Legacy (2018) #1 (A-story)	528	23 Dec 2020	Geoff Shaw Inhumans cover: 978-1302926823
1	Marvel Cosmic Universe by Donny Cates Vol. 1	2017-2019	Thanos (2016) #13–18, Annual (2018) #1; Cosmic Ghost Rider (2018) #1–5; Death of the Inhumans (2018) #1–5; Silver Surfer: Black (2019) #1–5; Thanos Legacy (2018) #1 (A-story)	528	23 Dec 2020	Tradd Moore Silver Surfer DM cover: 978-1302926830

=== Chris Claremont ===
#	Title	Years covered	Material collected	Pages	Released	ISBN
	Marvel Universe by Chris Claremont	1974-2009	War is Hell #9–15; Black Goliath #2–5; Captain Britain (U.K.) #1–10; Doctor Strange (1974) #38–45; Man-Thing (1979) #4–8, 10–11; Fantastic Four vs. The X-Men #1–4; Contest of Champions II #1–5; X-Men Unlimited #36; Mekanix #1–6; Big Hero 6 #1–5	1,144	5 Aug 2017	978-1302907150

=== Jack Kirby ===
#	Title	Years covered	Material collected	Pages	Released	ISBN
	The Complete Kirby War and Romance	1956-1965	Material from (some covers only) Battle (1951) #64–70, Battleground (1954) #14, Sgt. Fury (1963) #1–8, 10–20, 25, Love Romances (1949) #83–85, 87–88, 96–106, My Own Romance (1949) #71–76 and Teen-Age Romance (1960) #84–86 (The Yellow Claw (1956) #2–4 was originally planned for inclusion, but was removed before publishing)	592	21 May 2021	Jack Kirby war cover: 978-1302922085
	The Complete Kirby War and Romance	1956-1965	Material from (some covers only) Battle (1951) #64–70, Battleground (1954) #14, Sgt. Fury (1963) #1–8, 10–20, 25, Love Romances (1949) #83–85, 87–88, 96–106, My Own Romance (1949) #71–76 and Teen-Age Romance (1960) #84–86 (The Yellow Claw (1956) #2–4 was originally planned for inclusion, but was removed before publishing)	592	21 May 2021	Jack Kirby romance DM cover: 978-1302929541
	Timely's Greatest: The Golden Age Simon and Kirby	1939-1941	Material from Daring Mystery Comics #1–3, 6–8; Red Raven Comics #1; Marvel Mystery Comics #12–25; Human Torch #2 (1); Captain America Comics #1–10; U.S.A. Comics #1–3; All-Winners Comics #1–2; Young Allies Comics #1; Mystic Comics #7	840	5 Nov 2019	Joe Simon cover: 978-1302919344
	Timely's Greatest: The Golden Age Simon and Kirby	1939-1941	Material from Daring Mystery Comics #1–3, 6–8; Red Raven Comics #1; Marvel Mystery Comics #12–25; Human Torch #2 (1); Captain America Comics #1–10; U.S.A. Comics #1–3; All-Winners Comics #1–2; Young Allies Comics #1; Mystic Comics #7	840	5 Nov 2019	Jack Kirby DM cover: 978-1302919566

=== Stan Lee ===
#	Title	Years covered	Material collected	Pages	Released	ISBN
	The Best Marvel Stories by Stan Lee	1941-2014	Incredible Hulk #1; Avengers #1, 15–16; X-Men #4–5; Sgt. Fury #8; Fantastic Four Annual #2–3; Patsy Walker #119; Daredevil #7, 47; Captain America #109; Thor #179–181; Amazing Spider-Man #96–98; Marvel Premiere #3; Savage She-Hulk #1; Silver Surfer (1988) #1–2; material from Captain America Comics #3, 16; Mystic Comics #6; Suspense #29; Black Knight (1955) #1; Millie the Model #100; Life with Millie #10; Amazing Adult Fantasy #9, 11; Amazing Fantasy #15; Tales to Astonish #35; Fantastic Four #11; Tales of Suspense #39; Rawhide Kid #33; Strange Tales #135; Thor #146–152; Silver Surfer (1968) #3, 5; Our Love Story #5; Amazing Spider-Man #365, 634-635; Spectacular Spider-Man Super Special #1; Marvel 75th Anniversary Celebration #1; Amazing Spider-Man newspaper strip	896	29 Nov 2022	978-1302948146
	The Best Marvel Stories by Stan Lee	1941-2014		896	29 Nov 2022	Jack Kirby DM cover: 978-1302948153
1	Marvel Masters of Suspense: Stan Lee and Steve Ditko Vol. 1	1956-1961	Material from Journey into Mystery (1952) #33, 38, 50–73, Strange Tales (1951) #46, 50, 67–91, Tales to Astonish (1959) #1–26, Tales of Suspense (1959) #1–15, 17–24, Strange Worlds (1958) #1–5, World of Fantasy (1956) #16–19, Amazing Adventures (1961) #1–6, Journey into Unknown Worlds (1950) #45, 51, Mystery Tales (1950) #40, 45, 47, Two-Gun Western (1956) #4, World of Suspense (1956) #2, Marvel Tales (1949) #147, Spellbound (1952) #29, Strange Tales of the Unusual (1955) #5, Astonishing (1951) #53, World of Mystery (1956) #3, 6, Battle (1951) #63 and Gunsmoke Western (1955) #66	688	27 Aug 2019	Steve Ditko cover: 978-1302918750
2	Marvel Masters of Suspense: Stan Lee and Steve Ditko Vol. 2	1961-1963	Amazing Adult Fantasy (1961) #7–14; material from Journey into Mystery (1952) #74–96, Strange Tales (1951) #92–109, 112–113, Tales to Astonish (1959) #27–48, Tales of Suspense (1959) #25–44, 46 and Amazing Fantasy (1962) #15	696	3 Mar 2020	Steve Ditko cover: 978-1302922092
1	Monsters: The Marvel Monsterbus by Stan Lee, Larry Lieber and Jack Kirby	1959-1961	Material from Strange Tales of the Unusual (1955) #7, Astonishing (1951) #56, Strange Tales (1951) #67–70, 72–86, Journey into Mystery (1952) #51–70, World of Fantasy (1956) #15–19, Strange Worlds (1958) #1, 3–5, Tales to Astonish (1959) #1, 3–19 and Tales of Suspense (1959) #2–19	872	16 May 2017	978-1302908614
2	Monsters: The Marvel Monsterbus by Stan Lee, Larry Lieber and Jack Kirby	1961-1970	Material from Strange Tales (1951) #87–100, Annual (1962) #1, Journey into Mystery (1952) #71–82, Tales to Astonish (1959) #20–34, Tales of Suspense (1959) #20–38, Amazing Adventures (1961) #1–6 and Chamber of Darkness (1969) #4–5	872	15 Aug 2017	978-1302908621

=== Rob Liefeld ===
#	Title	Years covered	Material collected	Pages	Released	ISBN
	Marvel Universe by Rob Liefeld	1989-2006	X-Factor (1986) #40; Uncanny X-Men (1981) #245; What If? (1989) #7; Captain America (1996) #1–6; Avengers (1996) #1–7; Wolverine (1988) #154–157; Onslaught Reborn #1–5; material from Amazing Spider-Man Annual #23, Marvel Comics Presents (1988) #51–53, 85–86, 99 and Heroes Reborn #1/2	856	15 Oct 2019	978-1302920029

=== Jeph Loeb ===
#	Title	Years covered	Material collected	Pages	Released	ISBN
	Yellow, Blue, Gray and White by Jeph Loeb and Tim Sale	2001-2015	Daredevil: Yellow #1–6; Spider-Man: Blue #1–6; Hulk: Gray #1–6; Captain America: White #0–5	664	18 Dec 2018	978-1302914059

=== Frank Miller ===
#	Title	Years covered	Material collected	Pages	Released	ISBN
	Marvel Universe by Frank Miller	1979-1984	Peter Parker, the Spectacular Spider-Man (1976) #27–28; Marvel Two-in-One (1974) #51; Marvel Spotlight (1979) #8; Amazing Spider-Man Annual #14–15; Marvel Team-Up Annual #4; Wolverine (1982) #1–4; Marvel Fanfare (1982) #18; material from Marvel Preview #23, Marvel Team-Up (1972) #100, Power Man and Iron Fist (1978) #76, Incredible Hulk Annual #11 and Official Handbook of the Marvel Universe (1983) #2–6, 8, 10	448	19 Dec 2018	978-1302912772

== Miscellaneous omnibuses ==
=== DC versus Marvel ===
The DC versus Marvel Omnibus is produced by DC Comics as part of a joint venture with Marvel. It includes stories with DC and Marvel superheroes battling one another, or working together. There will only ever be one printing.

The Amalgam omnibus collects stories with various DC and Marvel superheroes combined into a unique single character. It was delayed after a printing error led to multiple copies being destroyed.

Title	Years covered	Material collected	Pages	Released	ISBN
DC versus Marvel	1976, 1995	Superman vs. The Amazing Spider-Man, Marvel Treasury Edition #28 – Superman and Spider-Man, DC Special Series #27 – Batman vs. The Incredible Hulk, and more: Marvel and DC Present: Featuring the Uncanny X-Men and the New Teen Titans, Batman/Punisher: Lake of Fire, Punisher/Batman: Deadly Knights, Darkseid vs. Galactus: The Hunger, Spider-Man and Batman: Disordered Minds, Green Lantern/Silver Surfer: Unholy Alliances', Silver Surfer/Superman #1, Batman & Captain America, Daredevil/Batman: Eye for an Eye, Batman & Spider-Man: New Age Dawning, Superman/Fantastic Four: The Infinite Destruction, Incredible Hulk vs. Superman, Batman/Daredevil: King of New York	1,096	29 Oct 2024	George Perez cover: 978-1779523259
DC versus Marvel	1976, 1995		1,096	29 Oct 2024	Jim Lee DM cover: 978-1779528827
DC Versus Marvel: The Amalgam Age Omnibus	1996	DC vs. Marvel #1, 4; Marvel vs. DC #2-3, and more: Amazon; Assassins; Dr. Strangefate; Dark Claw; Super Soldier; Bruce Wayne: Agent of S.H.I.E.L.D.; Bullets and Bracelets; Speed Demon; Spider-Boy; X-Patrol; DC/Marvel All Access #1-4; Bat-Thing; Dark Claw Adventures; Generation Hex; JLX Unleashed; Lobo the Duck; Super Soldier: Man of War; Challengers of the Fantastic; Exciting X-Patrol; Iron Lantern; Magnetic Men Featuring Magneto; Spider-Boy Team-Up; Thorion of the New Asgods; Unlimited Access #1-4	1,216	31 Dec 2024	Dave Gibbons cover: 978-1779523266
DC Versus Marvel: The Amalgam Age Omnibus	1996		1,216	31 Dec 2024	Jim Lee DM cover: 978-1779528834

=== Marvel Age ===
A promotional magazine featuring previews and news relating to Marvel Comics.

#	Title	Years covered	Material collected	Pages	Released	ISBN
1	Marvel Age Vol. 1	1983-1986	Marvel Age (1983) #1–34, Annual (1985) #1	1,192	10 Oct 2023	Kerry Gammill cover: 978-1302953270
1	Marvel Age Vol. 1	1983-1986	Marvel Age (1983) #1–34, Annual (1985) #1	1,192	10 Oct 2023	Richard Howell DM cover: 978-1302953287

=== The Official Handbook of the Marvel Universe ===
#	Title	Years covered	Material collected	Pages	Released	ISBN
	The Official Handbook of the Marvel Universe	1983-1984	Official Handbook of the Marvel Universe (1983) #1–15	576	19 Nov 2019	John Byrne cover: 978-1302920609
	The Official Handbook of the Marvel Universe: Deluxe Edition	1985-1988	Official Handbook of the Marvel Universe: Deluxe Edition (1985) #1–20	1,392	3 Mar 2021	John Byrne cover: 978-1302923648
	The Official Handbook of the Marvel Universe: Deluxe Edition	1985-1988	Official Handbook of the Marvel Universe: Deluxe Edition (1985) #1–20	1,392	3 Mar 2021	Ron Frenz DM cover: 978-1302927974
	The Official Handbook of the Marvel Universe Update '89	1989	Official Handbook of the Marvel Universe Update '89 (1989) #1–8	544	27 Dec 2022	Ron Frenz Villains cover: 978-1302934583
	The Official Handbook of the Marvel Universe Update '89	1989	Official Handbook of the Marvel Universe Update '89 (1989) #1–8	544	27 Dec 2022	Ron Frenz Heroes DM cover: 978-1302934576
1	Official Handbook of the Marvel Universe: Master Edition Vol. 1: A-L	1991-1993	Material from Official Handbook of the Marvel Universe: Master Edition (1991) #1–36, Entries A–L	888	6 Feb 2024	Hawkeye cover: 978-1302951771
1	Official Handbook of the Marvel Universe: Master Edition Vol. 1: A-L	1991-1993	Material from Official Handbook of the Marvel Universe: Master Edition (1991) #1–36, Entries A–L	888	6 Feb 2024	Captain America DM cover: 978-1302951788
2	Official Handbook of the Marvel Universe: Master Edition Vol. 2: M-Z	1991-1993	Material from Official Handbook of the Marvel Universe: Master Edition (1991) #1–36, Entries M–Z	880	11 Mar 2025	Heroes cover: 978-1302963521
2	Official Handbook of the Marvel Universe: Master Edition Vol. 2: M-Z	1991-1993	Material from Official Handbook of the Marvel Universe: Master Edition (1991) #1–36, Entries M–Z	880	11 Mar 2025	X-Men DM cover: 978-1302963538

== Statistics ==
=== Longest books ===
Pos	Title	Released	Price (USD)	Pages
1	Avengers vs. X-Men	1 Nov 2022	$150	1,680
=2	The Unbeatable Squirrel Girl	21 Mar 2023	$150	1,616
=2	The Immortal Hulk	15 Aug 2023	$150	1,616
4	War of the Realms	14 Oct 2020	$125	1,576
5	King in Black	6 Dec 2022	$150	1,568
6	X-Men by Mark Guggenheim	14 Oct 2025	$150	1,552
7	X-Men: Mutant Massacre Prelude	6 Aug 2024	$150	1,496
8	X-Men: Age of Krakoa - Dawn of X Vol. 1	16 Sep 2025	$150	1,472
9	Fantastic Four/Doom 2099	17 Jun 2025	$150	1,448
10	Spider-Verse / Spider-Geddon	21 Feb 2023	$125	1,440

=== Shortest books ===
Pos	Title	Released	Price (USD)	Pages
1	Devil Dinosaur by Jack Kirby	11 Jul 2007	$29.99	184
2	Planet of the Apes	18 Apr 2023	$100	224
=3	Young Avengers by Kieron Gillen & Jamie McKelvie	16 Dec 2014	$49.99 | $74.99 (reprint)	360
=3	Star Wars: The High Republic: Quest of the Jedi Vol. 2	12 Nov 2024	$75	360
5	Secret War by Brian Michael Bendis	1 Apr 2025	$75	368
6	The Superior Foes of Spider-Man	2 Feb 2016	$49.99	376
=7	Elektra by Frank Miller & Bill Sienkiewicz	22 Oct 2008	$74.99 | $100 (reprint)	384
=7	S.H.I.E.L.D. by Hickman and Weaver	21 Oct 2025	$75	384
9	Eternals by Jack Kirby	12 Jul 2006	$75	392
10	Guardians of the Galaxy by Gerry Duggan	26 Sep 2018	$75	408

=== Oldest books ===
Statistics for debut chart position and first-month sales come from ICv2. Estimates are for North American stores only, with UK purchases adding between three and 20 per cent to sales numbers.

Title	Released	Price (USD)	Pages	Chart Pos	Sales
Fantastic Four Vol. 1	22 Jun 2005	$45	848	58	1,835
Alias	29 Mar 2006	$69.99	592	62	1,843
Uncanny X-Men Vol. 1	31 May 2006	$99.99	848		
Eternals by Jack Kirby	12 Jul 2006	$75	392		
New X-Men	6 Dec 2006	$99.99	1,120		
Daredevil by Frank Miller and Klaus Janson	7 Mar 2007	$99.99	840	43	2,157
The Amazing Spider-Man Vol. 1	25 Apr 2007	$99.99	1,088	36	2,809
Silver Surfer Vol. 1	6 Jun 2007	$74.99	576		
Fantastic Four Vol. 2	13 Jun 2007	$99.99	832	73	1,537
Devil Dinosaur by Jack Kirby	11 Jul 2007	$29.99	184	57	1,952
Amazing Fantasy	5 Sep 2007	$74.99	416		
Captain America by Ed Brubaker	19 Sep 2007	$74.99	744	35	2,777
Uncanny X-Men Vol. 1 [REPRINT]	14 Nov 2007	$99.99	848		
Daredevil by Frank Miller Companion	28 Dec 2007	$49.99	608	46	1,887
The Invincible Iron Man Vol. 1	7 May 2008	$99.99	720		
The Incredible Hulk Vol. 1	25 Jun 2008	$99.99	752		
Howard the Duck	16 Jul 2008	$99.99	808		
Daredevil by Bendis & Maleev	27 Aug 2008	$99.99	848	72	1,502
Elektra by Frank Miller & Bill Sienkiewicz	22 Oct 2008	$74.99	384		
The Punisher by Garth Ennis	26 Nov 2008	$99.99	1,136	85	1,454

== Recent and upcoming releases ==
Title	Released	ISBN
August 2026
Ultimate X-Men Vol. 4	4 Aug 2026	Kaare Andrews cover: 978-1302969394
Ultimate X-Men Vol. 4	4 Aug 2026	Arthur Adams DM cover: 978-1302969400
Ultimate Spider-Man Vol. 2 [REPRINT]	4 Aug 2026	Mark Bagley cover: 978-1302970659
Ultimate Spider-Man Vol. 2 [REPRINT]	4 Aug 2026	Mark Bagley Carnage DM cover: 978-1302970666
Ultimate Spider-Man Vol. 2 [REPRINT]	4 Aug 2026	John Cassaday Sinister Six DM cover: 978-1302970673
Spider-Man by Zeb Wells Vol. 2	11 Aug 2026	John Romita Jr. cover: 978-1302966638
Spider-Man by Zeb Wells Vol. 2	11 Aug 2026	Ed McGuinness DM cover: 978-1302966645
Thor by Jason Aron Vol. 1 [REPRINT]	11 Aug 2026	Esad Ribić cover: 978-1302970680
Thor by Jason Aron Vol. 1 [REPRINT]	11 Aug 2026	Russell Dauterman DM cover: 978-1302970697
Thor by Jason Aron Vol. 1 [REPRINT]	11 Aug 2026	Joe Quesada DM cover: 978-1302970703
Star Wars: Dark Droids	18 Aug 2026	Leinil Yu cover: 978-1302961862
Star Wars: Dark Droids	18 Aug 2026	Pete Woods DM cover: 978-1302961879
King in Black [REPRINT]	18 Aug 2026	Ryan Stegman Fall cover: 978-1302970710
King in Black [REPRINT]	18 Aug 2026	Ryan Stegman Dawn DM cover: 978-1302970727
Marvel Fanfare Vol. 3	25 Aug 2026	Dave Gibbons cover: 978-1302968465
Marvel Fanfare Vol. 3	25 Aug 2026	Walter Simonson DM cover: 978-1302968472
X-Men: Blue & Gold - Bloodties	25 Aug 2026	Andy Kubert cover: 978-1302969707
X-Men: Blue & Gold - Bloodties	25 Aug 2026	John Romita Jr. DM cover: 978-1302969714
Spider-Verse/Spider-Geddon [REPRINT]	25 Aug 2026	Olivier Coipel cover: 978-1302970734
Spider-Verse/Spider-Geddon [REPRINT]	25 Aug 2026	Giuseppe Camuncoli DM cover: 978-1302970741
September 2026
Star Wars: Poe Dameron	8 Sep 2026	Phil Noto cover: 978-1302955878
Star Wars: Poe Dameron	8 Sep 2026	Rod Reis DM cover: 978-1302955885
Spider-Man by Chip Zdarsky [REPRINT]	15 Sep 2026	Adam Kubert cover: 978-1302969974
Spider-Man by Chip Zdarsky [REPRINT]	15 Sep 2026	Paulo Siqueira DM cover: 978-1302969981
Spider-Man by Chip Zdarsky [REPRINT]	15 Sep 2026	Chip Zdarsky DM cover: 978-1302969998
Daredevil Omnibus Vol. 4	22 Sep 2026	Gil Kane cover: 978-1302968489
Daredevil Omnibus Vol. 4	22 Sep 2026	Gene Colan DM cover: 978-1302968496
X-Men: Legacy – Legion [REPRINT]	22 Sep 2026	Mike Del Mundo cover: 978-1302969950
X-Men: Legacy – Legion [REPRINT]	22 Sep 2026	Kaare Andrews DM cover: 978-1302969967
X-Men: Age of Krakoa - Reign of X Omnibus Vol. 1	29 Sep 2026	Mahmud Asrar cover: 978-1302967154
X-Men: Age of Krakoa - Reign of X Omnibus Vol. 1	29 Sep 2026	Leinil Yu DM cover: 978-1302967161
Way of X	29 Sep 2026	Giuseppe Camuncoli cover: 978-1302969936
Way of X	29 Sep 2026	Tony Daniel DM cover: 978-1302969943
October 2026
Blood Hunt	6 Oct 2026	Pepe Larraz cover: 978-1302966652
Blood Hunt	6 Oct 2026	Alex Ross DM cover: 978-1302966669
Ghost Rider by Benjamin Percy	13 Oct 2026	Kael Ngu cover: 978-1302966676
Ghost Rider by Benjamin Percy	13 Oct 2026	Ryan Stegman DM cover: 978-1302966683
X-Men: Age of Krakoa by Kieron Gillen	20 Oct 2026	Leinil Yu cover: 978-1302966706
X-Men: Age of Krakoa by Kieron Gillen	20 Oct 2026	Mark Brooks DM cover: 978-1302966713
The Uncanny X-Men Vol. 6	27 Oct 2026	Marc Silvestri cover: 978-1302968502
The Uncanny X-Men Vol. 6	27 Oct 2026	Barry Windsor-Smith DM cover: 978-1302968519
November 2026
Silver Surfer: The Infinity Gauntlet	3 Nov 2026	Ron Lim Infinity Gauntlet cover: 978-1302969837
Silver Surfer: The Infinity Gauntlet	3 Nov 2026	Ron Lim Marvel Age DM cover: 978-1302969844
X-Factor: The Original X-Men Vol. 3	10 Nov 2026	Whilce Portacio cover: 978-1302970208
X-Factor: The Original X-Men Vol. 3	10 Nov 2026	Mike Mignola DM cover: 978-1302970192
New Avengers Vol. 3	17 Nov 2026	Stuart Immonen cover: 978-1302969752
New Avengers Vol. 3	17 Nov 2026	David Yardin DM cover: 978-1302969745
Spider-Woman	24 Nov 2026	Joe Sinnott cover: 978-1302968526
Spider-Woman	24 Nov 2026	Steve Leialoha DM cover: 978-1302968533
December 2026
Fantastic Four by Dan Slott Vol. 2	1 Dec 2026	Mark Brooks cover: 978-1302961220
Fantastic Four by Dan Slott Vol. 2	1 Dec 2026	CAFU DM cover: 978-1302961237
Venom War	8 Dec 2026	Iban Coello cover: 978-1302966850
Venom War	8 Dec 2026	Carlos Gómez DM cover: 978-1302966867
Wolverine: Old Man Logan Vol. 1	15 Dec 2026	Andrea Sorrentino cover: 978-1302970147
Wolverine: Old Man Logan Vol. 1	15 Dec 2026	Rahzzah DM cover: 978-1302970154
Star Wars Legends: Menace Revealed Vol. 1	22 Dec 2026	Jan Duursema cover: 978-1302969660
Star Wars Legends: Menace Revealed Vol. 1	22 Dec 2026	Ramón Bachs DM cover: 978-1302969677
New Mutants Vol. 4	29 Dec 2026	Rob Liefeld Cable cover: 978-1302969806
New Mutants Vol. 4	29 Dec 2026	Rob Liefeld Deadpool DM cover: 978-1302969813
January 2027
Ghost Rider: Danny Ketch Vol. 3	5 Jan 2027	Henry Martinez cover: 978-1302970161
Ghost Rider: Danny Ketch Vol. 3	5 Jan 2027	Ron Garney DM cover: 978-1302970178
Gwenpool [REPRINT]	5 Jan 2027	Gurihiru Dirt Bike cover: 978-1302970000
Gwenpool [REPRINT]	5 Jan 2027	Chris Bachalo Pool Lounger DM cover: 978-1302970017
Runaways By Rainbow Rowell	12 Jan 2027	Kris Anka cover
Runaways By Rainbow Rowell	12 Jan 2027	Adrian Alphona DM cover
Marvel Team-Up Vol. 2	19 Jan 2027	Gil Kane cover
Marvel Team-Up Vol. 2	19 Jan 2027	Dave Cockrum DM cover
Star Wars Legends: The Clone Wars Vol. 1	19 Jan 2027	Jan Duursema cover
Star Wars Legends: The Clone Wars Vol. 1	19 Jan 2027	Dave Dorman DM cover
Predator Kills the Marvel Universe	26 Jan 2027	Lienil Yu cover
Predator Kills the Marvel Universe	26 Jan 2027	Gabriele Dell'Otto DM cover:
February 2027
Secret Wars: Battleworld Vol. 4	9 Feb 2027	Mark Bagley cover
Secret Wars: Battleworld Vol. 4	9 Feb 2027	Mike McKone DM cover
X-Men: Age of Krakoa - Reign of X Vol. 2	16 Feb 2027	Lienil Yu cover
X-Men: Age of Krakoa - Reign of X Vol. 2	16 Feb 2027	Pepe Larraz DM cover
Incredible Hulk Vol. 4	23 Feb 2027	Rich Buckler cover
Incredible Hulk Vol. 4	23 Feb 2027	Herb Trimpe DM cover
March 2027
Daredevil by Charles Soule [REPRINT]	2 Mar 2027	Phil Noto cover
Daredevil by Charles Soule [REPRINT]	2 Mar 2027	David Lopez DM cover
One World Under Doom	9 Mar 2027	Ben Harvey cover
One World Under Doom	9 Mar 2027	RB Silva DM cover
Star Wars: The Original Marvel Years Omnibus Vol. 1 [REPRINT]	16 Mar 2027	Howard Chaykin Cover: 978-1302970000
What The--?! Omnibus	23 Mar 2027	Jon Bogdanove Cover
Avengers By Jason Aaron Vol. 1	23 Mar 2027	Ed Mcguinness Cover
Avengers By Jason Aaron Vol. 1	23 Mar 2027	Sara Pichelli DM cover
Deadpool By Joe Kelly [REPRINT]	30 Mar 2027	Ed Mcguinness Cover
April 2027
Punisher: Enter the War Zone	6 Apr 2027	Marco Checchetto Cover
Punisher: Enter the War Zone	6 Apr 2027	Adi Granov DM cover
Iron Man By Michelinie, Layton & Romita Jr. Vol. 1	20 Apr 2027	John Romita Jr. Cover
Marvel Comics Presents Vol. 1	20 Apr 2027	Walter Simonson Cover
Marvel Comics Presents Vol. 1	20 Apr 2027	Marshall Rogers DM cover
Star Wars Legends: Legacy Vol. 2	27 Apr 2027	Jan Duursema Cover
Star Wars Legends: Legacy Vol. 2	27 Apr 2027	Dave Wilkins DM cover
May 2027
Avengers By Jed Mackay Omnibus	4 May 2027	Stuart Immonen Cover
Avengers By Jed Mackay Omnibus	4 May 2027	Stuart Immonen DM cover
Star Wars: The Original Marvel Years Omnibus Vol. 2	11 May 2027	Gene Day Cover
Spider-Man: Big Time Omnibus Vol. 1	18 May 2027	Humberto Ramos Cover
X-Men: Inferno Omnibus	25 May 2027	Marc Silvestri Goblin Queen Cover
July 2027
X-Men: Blue & Gold - Fatal Attractions	July 2027	Andy Kubert cover: TBC
X-Men: Blue & Gold - Fatal Attractions	July 2027	Greg Capullo DM cover: TBC
Moon Knight by Jed MacKay [REPRINT]	Jul 2027	Greg Capullo cover: TBC
Moon Knight by Jed MacKay [REPRINT]	Jul 2027	Arthur Adams DM cover: TBC

== See also ==
- Marvel oversized hardcovers
- Marvel Gallery Editions
- Marvel Epic Collections
- Marvel Complete Collections
- Spider-Man collected editions
- Daredevil collected editions
- Marvel Masterworks
- Essential Marvel
- DC Omnibus
- DC Finest trade paperbacks
- DC Compact Comics
