= List of DC Archive Editions =

DC Archive Editions are hardcover editions reprinting stories from currently DC Comics-owned properties of Golden Age and Silver Age comics, regardless of whether DC was the original publisher of those works. Will Eisner's The Spirit Archives, T.H.U.N.D.E.R Agents Archives, Mad Archives and Elfquest Archives are not technically part of the DC Archive Editions series (typified by a cover format consisting of a black pinstriped background into which a color v-shaped area is overlaid from the top, reaching almost to the bottom for all of the books) as they do not own those properties/characters, but are licensing them from the copyright holders (in the case of Mad, the property is owned by DC's parent company, but not DC themselves). These non-DC Archive Editions* series are included in the list here.

== Collection ==
Title	Vol. #	First printing	Years covered	Material collected	ISBN
The Action Heroes Archives	1	2004	1960–1961, 1965–1966	Captain Atom from Space Adventures #33–40, 42; Captain Atom #78–82	1-4012-0302-7
The Action Heroes Archives	2	2007	1966–1968, 1974–1975	Captain Atom stories from Captain Atom #83–89; Blue Beetle stories from Captain Atom #83–86; Blue Beetle #1–5; Charlton Portfolio #9–10; Charlton Bullseye #1–2; The Question stories from Blue Beetle #1–5; Mysterious Suspense #1; Charlton Bullseye #5	1-4012-1346-4
Adam Strange Archives	1	2003	1958–1960	Showcase #17–19; Mystery in Space #53–65	1-4012-0148-2
Adam Strange Archives	2	2006	1961–1962	Mystery in Space #66–80	1-4012-0780-4
Adam Strange Archives	3	2008	1963–1964, 1967	Mystery in Space #81–91; Hawkman #18; Strange Adventures #157	978-1-4012-1661-0
All-Star Comics Archives	0	2005	1940	All-Star Comics #1–2	1-4012-0791-X
All-Star Comics Archives	1	1992	1940–1941	All-Star Comics #3–6	1-56389-019-4
All-Star Comics Archives	2	1993	1941–1942	All-Star Comics #7–10	0-930289-12-9
All-Star Comics Archives	3	1997	1942	All-Star Comics #11–14	1-56389-370-3
All-Star Comics Archives	4	1998	1943	All-Star Comics #15–18	1-56389-433-5
All-Star Comics Archives	5	1999	1943–1944	All-Star Comics #19–23	1-56389-497-1
All-Star Comics Archives	6	2000	1945–1946	All-Star Comics #24–28	1-56389-636-2
All-Star Comics Archives	7	2001	1946–1947	All-Star Comics #29–33	1-56389-720-2
All-Star Comics Archives	8	2002	1947	All-Star Comics #34–38	1-56389-812-8
All-Star Comics Archives	9	2003	1948	All-Star Comics #39–43	1-4012-0001-X
All-Star Comics Archives	10	2004	1949	All-Star Comics #44–49	1-4012-0159-8
All-Star Comics Archives	11	2005	1949–1951	All-Star Comics #50–57	1-4012-0403-1
Aquaman Archives	1	2003	1959–1960	Aquaman stories from Adventure Comics #260–280, 282; Showcase #30–31	978-1-56389-943-0
The Atom Archives	1	2001	1961–1963	Showcase #34–36; The Atom #1–5	978-1-56389-717-7
The Atom Archives	2	2003	1963–1964	The Atom #6–13	978-1-4012-0014-5
Batman Archives	1	1990	1939–1941	Batman stories from Detective Comics #27–50	0-930289-60-9
Batman Archives	2	1991	1941–1942	Batman stories from Detective Comics #51–70	1-56389-000-3
Batman Archives	3	1994	1943–1944	Batman stories from Detective Comics #71–86	1-56389-099-2
Batman Archives	4	1998	1944–1945	Batman stories from Detective Comics #87–102	1-56389-414-9
Batman Archives	5	2001	1945–1946	Batman stories from Detective Comics #103–119	1-56389-725-3
Batman Archives	6	2005	1947–1948	Batman stories from Detective Comics #120–135	1-4012-0409-0
Batman Archives	7	2007	1948–1949	Batman stories from Detective Comics #136–154	1-4012-1493-2
Batman Archives	8	2012	1950–1951	Batman stories from Detective Comics #155–170	978-1-4012-3376-1
Batman: The Dark Knight Archives	1	1992	1940	Batman #1–4	1-56389-050-X
Batman: The Dark Knight Archives	2	1995	1941	Batman #5–8	1-56389-183-2
Batman: The Dark Knight Archives	3	2000	1942	Batman #9–12	1-56389-615-X
Batman: The Dark Knight Archives	4	2003	1942–1943	Batman #13–16	1-56389-983-3
Batman: The Dark Knight Archives	5	2006	1943	Batman #17–20	1-4012-0778-2
Batman: The Dark Knight Archives	6	2009	1944	Batman #21–25	1-4012-2547-0
Batman: The Dark Knight Archives	7	2010	1945	Batman #26–31	978-1-4012-2894-1
Batman: The Dark Knight Archives	8	2012	1945–1946	Batman #32–37	978-1-4012-3744-8
Batman: The Dynamic Duo Archives	1	2003	1964	Detective Comics #327–333; Batman #164–167	1-56389-932-9
Batman: The Dynamic Duo Archives	2	2006	1964–1965	Detective Comics #334–339; Batman #168–171	1-4012-0772-3
Batman: World's Finest Comics Archives	1	2002	1940–1944	Batman stories from The New York World's Fair Comics #2; World's Best Comics #1; World's Finest Comics #2–16	1-56389-819-5
Batman: World's Finest Comics Archives	2	2004	1945–1947	Batman stories from World's Finest Comics #17–32	1-4012-0163-6
Black Canary Archives	1	2001	1947–1949, 1965, 1969–1972	Johnny Thunder and Black Canary stories from Flash Comics #86–104; Comic Cavalcade #25; DC Special #3; Adventure Comics #399, 418–419; The Brave and the Bold #61–62	1-56389-734-2
Blackhawk Archives	1	2001	1941–1943	Blackhawk stories from Military Comics #1–17	1-56389-700-8
The Brave and the Bold Team-Up Archives	1	2005	1963–1965	The Brave and the Bold #50–56, 59	1-4012-0405-8
Challengers of the Unknown Archives	1	2003	1957–1958	Showcase #6–7, 11–12; Challengers of the Unknown #1–2	1-56389-997-3
Challengers of the Unknown Archives	2	2004	1958–1959	Challengers of the Unknown #3–8	1-4012-0153-9
Comic Cavalcade Archives	1	2005	1942–1943	All stories from Comic Cavalcade #1–3	1-4012-0658-1
DC Comics Rarities Archives	1	2004	1939–1940, 1944	All stories from The New York World's Fair Comics #1–2; The Big All-American Comic Book #1	1-4012-0007-9
Doom Patrol Archives	1	2002	1963–1964	My Greatest Adventure #80–85; Doom Patrol #86–89	1-56389-795-4
Doom Patrol Archives	2	2004	1964–1965	Doom Patrol #90–97	1-4012-0150-4
Doom Patrol Archives	3	2005	1965–1966	Doom Patrol #98–105; Challengers of the Unknown #48	1-4012-0766-9
Doom Patrol Archives	4	2008	1966–1967	Doom Patrol #106–113	978-1-4012-1646-7
Doom Patrol Archives	5	2008	1967–1968	Doom Patrol #114–121	978-1-4012-1720-4
Elfquest Archives*	1	2003	1978–1979	Elfquest #1–5	1-4012-0128-8
Elfquest Archives*	2	2005	1980–1981	Elfquest #6–10	1-4012-0129-6
Elfquest Archives*	3	2005	1981–1983	Elfquest #11–15	1-4012-0412-0
Elfquest Archives*	4	2007	1983–1984	Elfquest #16–20	1-4012-0773-1
Enemy Ace Archives	1	2002	1965, 1968	Enemy Ace stories from Our Army at War #151, #153, #155; Showcase #57–58; Star-Spangled War Stories #138–142	978-1-56389-896-9
Enemy Ace Archives	2	2006	1969–1970, 1974, 1976	Star-Spangled War Stories #143–145, 147–150, 152, 181–183, 200	978-1-4012-0776-2
The Flash Archives	1	1996	1949, 1956–1959	Flash Comics #104; Showcase #4, 8, 13–14; The Flash #105–108	978-1-56389-139-7
The Flash Archives	2	2000	1959–1960	The Flash #109–116	978-1-56389-606-4
The Flash Archives	3	2002	1960–1961	The Flash #117–124	978-1-56389-799-3
The Flash Archives	4	2006	1961–1962	The Flash #125–132	978-1-4012-0771-7
The Flash Archives	5	2009	1962–1963	The Flash #133–141	1-4012-2151-3
The Flash Archives	6	2012	1964–1965	The Flash #142–150	978-1-4012-3514-7
Golden Age Doctor Fate Archives	1	2007	1940–1944	Doctor Fate stories from More Fun Comics #55–98	1-4012-1348-0
Golden Age Flash Archives	1	1999	1940–1941	Flash stories from Flash Comics #1–17	1-56389-506-4
Golden Age Flash Archives	2	2005	1941	Flash stories from Flash Comics #18–24; All-Flash Quarterly #1–2	1-4012-0784-7
Golden Age Green Lantern Archives	1	1999	1940–1941	Green Lantern stories from All-American Comics #16–30; Green Lantern #1	1-56389-507-2
Golden Age Green Lantern Archives	2	2002	1941–1942	Green Lantern stories from All-American Comics #31–38; Green Lantern #2–3	1-56389-794-6
Golden Age Hawkman Archives **	1	2005	1940–1941	Hawkman stories from Flash Comics #1–22	1-4012-0418-X
Golden Age Sandman Archives	1	2004	1939–1941	Sandman stories from The New York World's Fair Comics #1–2; Adventure Comics #40–59	1-4012-0155-5
Golden Age Spectre Archives	1	2003	1940–1941	Spectre stories from More Fun Comics #52–70	1-56389-955-8
Golden Age Starman Archives	1	2000	1941–1942	Starman stories from Adventure Comics #61–76	1-56389-622-2
Golden Age Starman Archives	2	2009	1942–1944	Starman stories from Adventure Comics #77–102	1-4012-2283-8
Green Lantern Archives	1	1993	1959–1961	Showcase #22–24; Green Lantern (vol. 2) #1–5	978-1-56389-087-1
Green Lantern Archives	2	1999	1961–1962	Green Lantern (vol. 2) #6–13	978-1-56389-566-1
Green Lantern Archives	3	2001	1962–1963	Green Lantern (vol. 2) #14–21	978-1-56389-713-9
Green Lantern Archives	4	2002	1963–1964	Green Lantern (vol. 2) #22–29	978-1-56389-811-2
Green Lantern Archives	5	2004	1964–1965	Green Lantern (vol. 2) #30–38	978-1-4012-0404-4
Green Lantern Archives	6	2007	1965–1966	Green Lantern (vol. 2) #39–47	978-1-4012-1189-9
Green Lantern Archives	7	2012	1966–1967	Green Lantern (vol. 2) #48–57	978-1-4012-3513-0
Hawkman Archives	1	2000	1961–1964	The Brave and the Bold #34–36, 42–44; Mystery in Space #87–90	978-1-56389-611-8
Hawkman Archives	2	2004	1964–1965	Hawkman #1–8	978-1-4012-0161-6
The JSA All-Stars Archives	1	2007	1940–1942	Johnny Thunder from Flash Comics #1–5; The Hour-Man from Adventure Comics #48–52; The Atom from All-American Comics #19–23; Scribbly (featuring the Red Tornado) from All-American Comics #20–24; Doctor Mid-Nite from All-American Comics #25–29; Mister Terrific from Sensation Comics #1–5; Wildcat from Sensation Comics #1–5	978-1-4012-1472-2
Justice League of America Archives	1	1992	1960–1961	The Brave and the Bold #28–30; Justice League of America #1–6	978-1-56389-043-7
Justice League of America Archives	2	1993	1961–1962	Justice League of America #7–14	978-1-56389-119-9
Justice League of America Archives	3	1994	1962–1963	Justice League of America #15–22	978-1-56389-159-5
Justice League of America Archives	4	1998	1963–1964	Justice League of America #23–30	978-1-56389-412-1
Justice League of America Archives	5	1999	1964–1965	Justice League of America #31–38, 40	978-1-56389-540-1
Justice League of America Archives	6	2000	1965–1966	Justice League of America #41–47, 49–50	978-1-56389-625-5
Justice League of America Archives	7	2001	1967–1968	Justice League of America #51–57, 59–60	978-1-56389-704-7
Justice League of America Archives	8	2003	1968–1969	Justice League of America #61–66, 68–70	978-1-56389-977-5
Justice League of America Archives	9	2004	1969–1970	Justice League of America #71–75, 77–80	978-1-4012-0402-0
Justice League of America Archives	10	2012	1970–1971	Justice League of America #81–93	978-1-4012-3412-6
Kamandi Archives	1	2005	1972–1973	Kamandi, the Last Boy on Earth #1–10	978-1-4012-0414-3
Kamandi Archives	2	2007	1973–1974	Kamandi, the Last Boy on Earth #11–20	978-1-4012-1208-7
The Legion of Super-Heroes Archives	1	1991	1958–1963	Stories featuring the Legion from Adventure Comics #247, 267, 282, 290, 293, 300–305; Action Comics #267, 276, 287, 289; Superboy #86, 89, 98; Superman #147, Annual #4	978-1-56389-020-8
The Legion of Super-Heroes Archives	2	1992	1963–1964	Adventure Comics #306–317; Superman's Pal Jimmy Olsen #72; Superman Annual #4	978-1-56389-057-4
The Legion of Super-Heroes Archives	3	1993	1964	Adventure Comics #318–328; Superman's Pal Jimmy Olsen #76; Superboy #117	978-1-56389-102-1
The Legion of Super-Heroes Archives	4	1994	1965	Adventure Comics #329–339; Superboy #124–125	978-1-56389-123-6
The Legion of Super-Heroes Archives	5	1994	1966	Adventure Comics #340–349	978-1-56389-154-0
The Legion of Super-Heroes Archives	6	1996	1966–1967	Adventure Comics #350–358	978-1-56389-277-6
The Legion of Super-Heroes Archives	7	1997	1967–1968	Adventure Comics #359–367; Superman's Pal Jimmy Olsen #106	978-1-56389-398-8
The Legion of Super-Heroes Archives	8	1998	1968	Adventure Comics #368–376; Superboy #147	978-1-56389-430-5
The Legion of Super-Heroes Archives	9	1999	1969–1970	Adventure Comics #377–380; Action Comics #377–392	978-1-56389-514-2
The Legion of Super-Heroes Archives	10	2000	1971–1974	Adventure Comics #403; Superboy #172–173, 183–184, 188, 190–191, 193, 195, 197–202	978-1-56389-628-6
The Legion of Super-Heroes Archives	11	2001	1974–1975	Superboy #203–212	978-1-56389-730-6
The Legion of Super-Heroes Archives	12	2003	1975–1976	Superboy #213–223; Karate Kid #1	978-1-56389-961-4
The Legion of Super-Heroes Archives	13	2012	1976–1977	Superboy #224–233; DC Special #28	978-1-4012-3439-3
The Mad Archives*	1	2002	1952–1953	Mad #1–6	978-1-56389-816-7
The Mad Archives*	2	2007	1953–1954	Mad #7–12	978-1-4012-1388-6
The Mad Archives*	3	2012	1954	Mad #13–18	978-1-4012-3427-0
The Mad Archives*	4	2012	1955	Mad #19–24	978-1-4012-3761-5
Metal Men Archives	1	2006	1962–1963	Showcase #37–40; Metal Men #1–5	1-4012-0774-X
Metal Men Archives	2	2013	1964–1966	Metal Men #6–20	978-1-4012-3867-4
The New Teen Titans Archives	1	1999	1980–1981	DC Comics Presents #26; The New Teen Titans #1–8	1-56389-485-8
The New Teen Titans Archives	2	2004	1981–1982	The New Teen Titans #9–16; Best of DC #18	1-56389-951-5
The New Teen Titans Archives	3	2006	1982	The New Teen Titans #17–20; Tales of the New Teen Titans #1–4	1-4012-1144-5
The New Teen Titans Archives	4	2008	1982	The New Teen Titans #21–27, Annual #1	1-4012-1959-4
Plastic Man Archives	1	1998	1941–1943	Plastic Man stories from Police Comics #1–20	1-56389-468-8
Plastic Man Archives	2	2000	1943–1944	Police Comics #21–30; Plastic Man #1	1-56389-621-4
Plastic Man Archives	3	2001	1944–1945	Police Comics #31–39; Plastic Man #2	1-56389-847-0
Plastic Man Archives	4	2003	1945	Police Comics #40–49; Plastic Man #3	1-56389-835-7
Plastic Man Archives	5	2003	1946	Police Comics #50–58; Plastic Man #4	1-56389-986-8
Plastic Man Archives	6	2004	1946–1947	Police Comics #59–65; Plastic Man #5–6	1-4012-0154-7
Plastic Man Archives	7	2005	1947	Police Comics #66–71; Plastic Man #7–8	1-4012-0413-9
Plastic Man Archives	8	2006	1947–1948	Police Comics #72–77; Plastic Man #9–10	1-4012-0777-4
Robin Archives	1	2005	1947–1948	Robin stories from Star-Spangled Comics #65–85	1-4012-0415-5
Robin Archives	2	2010	1948–1950	Robin stories from Star-Spangled Comics #86–105	1-4012-2625-6
Seven Soldiers of Victory Archives	1	2005	1941–1942	Leading Comics #1–4	1-4012-0401-5
Seven Soldiers of Victory Archives	2	2007	1942–1943	Leading Comics #5–8	1-4012-1308-1
Seven Soldiers of Victory Archives	3	2008	1943–1945	Leading Comics #9–14	978-1-4012-1694-8
Sgt. Rock Archives	1	2002	1959–1960	G.I. Combat #68; Our Army at War #81–96	978-1-56389-841-9
Sgt. Rock Archives	2	2003	1960–1961	Our Army at War #97–110	978-1-4012-0146-3
Sgt. Rock Archives	3	2005	1961–1962	Our Army at War #111–125	978-1-4012-0410-5
Sgt. Rock Archives	4	2012	1962–1963	Our Army at War #126–137; Showcase #45	978-1-4012-3726-4
The Shazam! Archives	1	1992	1940–1941	Flash Comics (ashcan) #1; Thrill Comics (ashcan) #1; Whiz Comics #2–15	978-1-56389-053-6
The Shazam! Archives	2	1999	1941	Special Edition Comics #1; Captain Marvel Adventures #1; Whiz Comics #15–20	978-1-56389-521-0
The Shazam! Archives	3	2002	1941	America's Greatest Comics #1; Captain Marvel Adventures #2–3; Whiz Comics #21–24	978-1-56389-832-7
The Shazam! Archives	4	2003	1941–1942	Captain Marvel Adventures #4–5; Master Comics #21–22; Whiz Comics #25; America's Greatest Comics #2	978-1-4012-0160-9
The Shazam! Family Archives	1	2006	1942	Master Comics #23–32; Captain Marvel Jr. #1; Captain Marvel Adventures #18	978-1-4012-0779-3
Will Eisner's The Spirit Archives*	1	2000	1940	06/02/1940 – 12/29/1940	1-56389-673-7
Will Eisner's The Spirit Archives*	2	2000	1941	01/05/1941 – 06/29/1941	1-56389-675-3
Will Eisner's The Spirit Archives*	3	2001	1941	07/06/1941 – 12/28/1941	1-56389-676-1
Will Eisner's The Spirit Archives*	4	2001	1942	01/04/1942 – 06/28/1942	1-56389-714-8
Will Eisner's The Spirit Archives*	5	2001	1942	07/05/1942 – 12/27/1942	1-56389-731-8
Will Eisner's The Spirit Archives*	6	2001	1943	01/03/1943 – 06/27/1943	1-56389-744-X
Will Eisner's The Spirit Archives*	7	2002	1943	07/04/1943 – 12/26/1943	1-56389-807-1
Will Eisner's The Spirit Archives*	8	2002	1944	01/02/1944 – 06/25/1944	1-56389-820-9
Will Eisner's The Spirit Archives*	9	2002	1944	07/02/1944 – 12/31/1944	1-56389-836-5
Will Eisner's The Spirit Archives*	10	2003	1945	01/07/1945 – 06/24/1945	1-56389-962-0
Will Eisner's The Spirit Archives*	11	2003	1945	07/01/1945 – 12/30/1945	1-56389-989-2
Will Eisner's The Spirit Archives*	12	2003	1946	01/06/1946 – 06/30/1946	1-4012-0006-0
Will Eisner's The Spirit Archives*	13	2004	1946	07/07/1946 – 12/29/1946	1-4012-0149-0
Will Eisner's The Spirit Archives*	14	2004	1947	01/05/1947 – 06/29/1947	1-4012-0158-X
Will Eisner's The Spirit Archives*	15	2004	1947	07/06/1947 – 12/28/1947	1-4012-0162-8
Will Eisner's The Spirit Archives*	16	2005	1948	01/04/1948 – 06/27/1948	1-4012-0406-6
Will Eisner's The Spirit Archives*	17	2005	1948	07/04/1948 – 12/26/1948	1-4012-0417-1
Will Eisner's The Spirit Archives*	18	2006	1949	01/02/1949 – 06/26/1949	1-4012-0769-3
Will Eisner's The Spirit Archives*	19	2006	1949	07/03/1949 – 12/25/1949	1-4012-0775-8
Will Eisner's The Spirit Archives*	20	2006	1950	01/01/1950 – 06/25/1950	1-4012-0781-2
Will Eisner's The Spirit Archives*	21	2007	1950	07/02/1950 – 12/31/1950	978-1-4012-1254-4
Will Eisner's The Spirit Archives*	22	2007	1951	01/07/1951 – 06/24/1951	978-1-4012-1309-1
Will Eisner's The Spirit Archives*	23	2007	1951	07/01/1951 – 12/30/1951	978-1-4012-1511-8
Will Eisner's The Spirit Archives*	24	2008	1952	01/06/1952 – 10/05/1952	1-4012-1698-6
Will Eisner's The Spirit Archives*	25	2008	1941–1944	10/13/1941 – 03/11/44 (daily comic strip)	978-1-4012-1856-0
Will Eisner's The Spirit Archives*	26	2009	1952-2000s	All Will Eisner drawn post-1952 stories and most new cover artwork, illustrations and pinups (missing are those Eisner did for Warren Publishing)	1-4012-1974-8
Sugar and Spike Archives	1	2011	1956	Sugar and Spike #1–10	978-1-4012-3112-5
Supergirl Archives	1	2001	1958–1960	Supergirl stories from Superman #123; Action Comics #252–268	978-1-56389-737-5
Supergirl Archives	2	2003	1960–1962	Supergirl stories from Action Comics #269–285	978-1-4012-0000-8
Superman Archives	1	1989	1939–1940	Superman #1–4	0-930289-47-1
Superman Archives	2	1990	1940	Superman #5–8	0-930289-76-5
Superman Archives	3	1991	1941	Superman #9–12	1-56389-002-X
Superman Archives	4	1994	1941–1942	Superman #13–16	1-56389-107-7
Superman Archives	5	2000	1942	Superman #17–20	1-56389-602-8
Superman Archives	6	2003	1943	Superman #21–24	1-56389-969-8
Superman Archives	7	2006	1943–1944	Superman #25–29	1-4012-1051-1
Superman Archives	8	2010	1944–1945	Superman #30–35	978-1-4012-2885-9
Superman: The Action Comics Archives	1	1997	1938–1939	Superman stories from Action Comics #1–20	1-56389-335-5
Superman: The Action Comics Archives	2	1998	1940–1941	Superman stories from Action Comics #21–36	1-56389-426-2
Superman: The Action Comics Archives	3	2001	1941–1942	Superman stories from Action Comics #37–52	1-56389-710-5
Superman: The Action Comics Archives	4	2005	1942–1943	Superman stories from Action Comics #53–68	1-4012-0408-2
Superman: The Action Comics Archives	5	2007	1944–1945	Superman stories from Action Comics #69–85	1-4012-1188-7
Superman: The Man of Tomorrow Archives	1	2004	1958	Superman stories from Action Comics #241–247; Superman #122–126	1-4012-0156-3
Superman: The Man of Tomorrow Archives	2	2006	1959	Superman stories from Action Comics #248–254; Superman #127–131	1-4012-0767-7
Superman: The Man of Tomorrow Archives	3	2014	1959–1960	Superman stories from Action Comics #255–266; Superman #132–139	1-4012-4107-7
Superman: The World's Finest Comics Archives	1	2004	1939–1944	Superman stories from The New York World's Fair Comics #1–2; World's Best Comics #1; World's Finest Comics #2–15	1-4012-0151-2
Superman: The World's Finest Comics Archives	2	2009	1945–1948	Superman stories from World's Finest Comics #17–32	1-4012-2470-9
Superman's Girl Friend, Lois Lane	1	2011	1957–1959	Stories from Showcase #9–10 and Superman's Girl Friend, Lois Lane #1–8	978-1-4012-3315-0
The Silver Age Teen Titans Archives	1	2003	1964–1966	The Brave and the Bold #54, 60; Showcase #59; Teen Titans #1–5	978-1-4012-0071-8
The Silver Age Teen Titans Archives	2	2013	1966–1969	Teen Titans #6–20; The Brave and the Bold #83	978-1-4012-4105-6
T.H.U.N.D.E.R. Agents Archives*	1	2002	1965–1966	T.H.U.N.D.E.R. Agents #1–4	1-56389-903-5
T.H.U.N.D.E.R. Agents Archives*	2	2003	1966	T.H.U.N.D.E.R. Agents #5–7; Dynamo #1	1-56389-970-1
T.H.U.N.D.E.R. Agents Archives*	3	2003	1966	T.H.U.N.D.E.R. Agents #8–10; Dynamo #2	1-4012-0015-X
T.H.U.N.D.E.R. Agents Archives*	4	2004	1966–1967	T.H.U.N.D.E.R. Agents #11; Dynamo #3; Noman #1–2	1-4012-0152-0
T.H.U.N.D.E.R. Agents Archives*	5	2004	1967	T.H.U.N.D.E.R. Agents #12–14; Dynamo #4	1-4012-0164-4
T.H.U.N.D.E.R. Agents Archives*	6	2005	1967–1969	T.H.U.N.D.E.R. Agents #15–20	1-4012-0416-3
T.H.U.N.D.E.R. Agents Archives*	7	2011	1984–1986	T.H.U.N.D.E.R. Agents #1–5 (Deluxe Comics series)	978-1-4012-3148-4
Wonder Woman Archives	1	1998	1941–1942	All-Star Comics #8; Sensation Comics #1–12; Wonder Woman #1	1-56389-402-5
Wonder Woman Archives	2	2000	1943	Wonder Woman #2–4; Sensation Comics #13–17	978-1-56389-594-4
Wonder Woman Archives	3	2002	1943	Wonder Woman #5–7; Sensation Comics #18–24	1-56389-814-4
Wonder Woman Archives	4	2003	1944	Wonder Woman #8–9; Sensation Comics #25–32	1-4012-0145-8
Wonder Woman Archives	5	2007	1944–1945	Wonder Woman #10–12; Sensation Comics #33–40	1-4012-1270-0
Wonder Woman Archives	6	2010	1945–1946	Wonder Woman #13–15; Sensation Comics #41–48	978-1-4012-2734-0
Wonder Woman Archives	7	2012	1946	Wonder Woman #16–18; Sensation Comics #49–57	978-1-4012-3743-1
Wonder Woman: The Amazon Princess Archives	1	2013	1958–1959	Wonder Woman #98–110	978-1-4012-3865-0
World's Finest Comics Archives	1	1999	1952, 1954–1956	Superman and Batman team-ups from Superman #76; World's Finest Comics #71–85	1-56389-488-2
World's Finest Comics Archives	2	2001	1957–1959	Superman and Batman team-ups from World's Finest Comics #86–101	1-56389-743-1
World's Finest Comics Archives	3	2005	1959–1961	Superman and Batman team-ups from World's Finest Comics #102–116	1-4012-0411-2

  - Initial copies of Golden Age Hawkman Volume 1 were printed with the story on pages 131–136 out of sequence (i.e., 1, 3, 2, 5, 4, and 6). Corrected copies were made by removing those pages, and tipping in the corrected sequence. Both versions thus say "First printing" in the indicia. For a while, DC would switch out copies if they were sent in.

== See also ==
- Showcase Presents
