= The Best of DC =

Publication information
- Publisher: DC Comics
- Schedule: Bi-monthly (#1–10); Monthly (#11–71)
- Format: Ongoing series
- Genre: Superhero
- Publication date: September–October 1979 – April 1986
- No. of issues: 71

Creative team
- Written by: List: John Albano Tom DeFalco Michael Fleisher Paul Levitz Sheldon Mayer Marv Wolfman
- Penciller(s): List: Carmine Infantino Jack Kirby Sheldon Mayer Win Mortimer George Pérez Vince Squeglia Romeo Tanghal
- Inker(s): List: Tex Blaisdell Tenny Henson Sheldon Mayer George Pérez Rodin Rodriguez Mike Royer Henry Scarpelli Vince Squeglia Romeo Tanghal
- Editor(s): List: Julius Schwartz (#1, 3, 5–8, 11–13, 15–17, 19, 22–23, 25, 27, 32) Paul Levitz (#2, 9) Joe Orlando (#4, 60) E. Nelson Bridwell (#10) Dick Giordano (#14) Len Wein (#18, 21, 30–31) Mike W. Barr (#20, 24, 26) Carl Gafford (#28–29) Nick Cuti (#33–59, 61–69) Barbara Randall (#70–71)

The Best of DC is a digest size comics anthology published by DC Comics from September–October 1979 to April 1986. The series ran for 71 issues and while it primarily featured reprints of older comic books, it occasionally published new stories or inventory material.

== Publication history ==
The Best of DC began publication with a September–October 1979 cover date. The digest size format was chosen as a way of gaining distribution in supermarkets and was successful enough that a second such series, DC Special Blue Ribbon Digest, was launched in 1980. The series was 100 pages including covers for 95¢. The "Year's Best Comics Stories" issues included extra pages and a higher price point.

Two Rudolph the Red-Nosed Reindeer stories intended for publication in the All-New Collectors' Edition treasury series were printed in The Best of DC #4 after the former title was cancelled in the DC Implosion. A Sandman story written and drawn in 1975 was published in The Best of DC #22 (March 1981) after sitting in DC's inventory for several years.

Writer Michael Fleisher and artist Romeo Tanghal crafted a new story which revealed the origin of the Penguin in The Best of DC #10 (March 1981). Other new material was prepared occasionally for the title including a Teen Titans story in #18 (Nov. 1981) by writer Marv Wolfman and artists Carmine Infantino and Romeo Tanghal and a Legion of Super-Heroes tale in #24 (May 1982) by Paul Levitz, Infantino, and Rodin Rodriguez. Several Sugar and Spike stories by writer-artist Sheldon Mayer which were prepared for overseas markets were published in various issues of The Best of DC The Super Jrs. characters made their only comic book appearance in #58 (March 1985) in a story written by Tom DeFalco and drawn by Vince Squeglia The Best of DC was cancelled as of issue #71 (April 1986).

== The issues ==
Issue (Cover Date)	Feature	Contents
#1 (Sept.–Oct.1979)	Superman	Reprints stories from Action Comics #196, 300, 442 and Superman #149, 265.
#2 (Nov.–Dec. 1979)	Batman	Reprints stories from Batman #7, 31, 48, 251 and Detective Comics #235, 246, 387.
#3 (Jan.–Feb. 1980)	Super Friends	Reprints stories from Justice League of America #57, Super Friends #3–4, 10, and Teen Titans #18.
#4 (March–April 1980)	Rudolph the Red-Nosed Reindeer	Previously unpublished Rudolph the Red-Nosed Reindeer stories by Sheldon Mayer and Tenny Henson. Reprints stories from Limited Collectors' Edition #C–50.
#5 (May–June 1980)	Year's Best Comics Stories	Reprints stories from Action Comics #502, Adventure Comics #466, DC Comics Presents #10, Detective Comics #483, G.I. Combat #213, House of Mystery #267, Jonah Hex #24, Secrets of Haunted House #17, and The Superman Family #196–197.
#6 (July–Aug. 1980)	Superman	Reprints stories from Action Comics #211, 331, 436, Superman #79, 85, 280, Superman's Girl Friend, Lois Lane #17, 45, and Superman's Pal Jimmy Olsen #51, 63.
#7 (Sept.–Oct. 1980)	Superboy	Reprints stories from Adventure Comics #258, 261 and Superboy #62, 80, 99, 119, 131, 171, 177.
#8 (Nov.–Dec. 1980)	Superman	Reprints stories from Action Comics #314, 337, 408 and Superman #99, 157, 160, 182, 220.
#9 (Jan.–Feb. 1981)	Batman	Reprints stories from Batman #216 and Detective Comics #444–448.
#10 (March 1981)	Secret Origins of Super-Villains	New Penguin story by Michael Fleisher, Romeo Tanghal, and Tex Blaisdell; Reprints stories from Action Comics #340, Aquaman #29, The Brave and the Bold #36, The Flash #117, Green Lantern #24, and World's Finest Comics #95.
#11 (April 1981)	Year's Best Comics Stories	Reprints stories from Action Comics #507–508, Batman #321, DC Comics Presents #24, DC Special Series #21, Detective Comics #494, Jonah Hex #39, Sgt. Rock #337, Time Warp #5, and The Unexpected #205.
#12 (May 1981)	Superman In the Past...Future...And on Other Worlds	Reprints stories from Action Comics #399, 430 and Superman #122, 236, 243, 255.
#13 (June 1981)	DC Comics Presents	Reprints stories from Superman #195, 279 and World's Finest Comics #201, 203, 210.
#14 (July 1981)	Batman's Villains	Reprints stories from Batman #234, 260, 263, 266 and Detective Comics #473.
#15 (August 1981)	Superboy	Reprints stories from Adventure Comics #292 and Superboy #64, 73, 76, 83, 86, 88, 90, 116, 195.
#16 (September 1981)	Superman	Reprints stories from Action Comics #241, 253, 277, 301, Superman #53, 276, and World's Finest Comics #176.
#17 (October 1981)	Supergirl	Reprints stories from Action Comics #256, 285, 318, 424, Supergirl #1, and The Superman Family #165.
#18 (November 1981)	The New Teen Titans	New Teen Titans story by Marv Wolfman, Carmine Infantino, and Romeo Tanghal. Reprints stories from Teen Titans #20–22, 24.
#19 (December 1981)	Superman	Reprints stories from Superman #162, 215, 300, Superman's Girl Friend, Lois Lane #19, 25, and World's Finest Comics #167.
#20 (January 1982)	World's Finest Comics	Reprints stories from World's Finest Comics #202, 207–208, 211.
#21 (February 1982)	Justice Society of America	Reprints stories from All Star Comics #35, The Brave and the Bold #62, and DC Special #29.
#22 (March 1982)	Christmas with the Super-Heroes	First color publication of a Sandman story by Michael Fleisher, Jack Kirby, and Mike Royer originally prepared for the never-published The Sandman #7. Reprints stories from Batman #27, 247, Batman Family #4, Captain Marvel Jr. #46, Justice League of America #110, and Teen Titans #13.
#23 (April 1982)	Year's Best Comics Stories	Reprints stories from DC Comics Presents #38, Detective Comics #500, 507, House of Mystery #288, Jonah Hex #53, The New Teen Titans #8, Sgt. Rock #349, Superman #363, Tales of the Green Lantern Corps #3, and World's Finest Comics #273.
#24 (May 1982)	Legion of Super-Heroes	New Legion of Super-Heroes story by Paul Levitz, Carmine Infantino, and Rodin Rodriguez. "Meet the Legion!" new feature pages by George Pérez; Reprints stories from Adventure Comics #357, 371–372 and Superboy #176.
#25 (June 1982)	Superman	Reprints stories from Action Comics #232, 422, 457, 497 and Superman #96, 254, 267, 285.
#26 (July 1982)	The Brave and the Bold	Reprints stories from The Brave and the Bold #9, 18, 21, 31, 38, 86.
#27 (August 1982)	Superman versus Luthor	Reprints stories from Action Comics #318–319, 423, Superman #213, 282, 292, and World's Finest Comics #59.
#28 (September 1982)	Binky's Summer Fun	New Binky stories. Reprints stories from Binky #72, 75, Binky's Buddies #6, 11, Leave It to Binky #70, and Sugar and Spike #4, 75, 93.
#29 (October 1982)	Sugar and Spike	New Sugar and Spike stories by Sheldon Mayer. Reprints stories from Leave It to Binky #71 and Sugar and Spike #3, 56, 58, 92, 97.
#30 (November 1982)	Detective Comics	Reprints stories from Action Comics #419, Batman #225, and Detective Comics #201, 209, 222, 227, 400–401, 425, 435, 444.
#31 (December 1982)	Justice League of America	Reprints stories from Justice League of America #75, 105–106, 161.
#32 (January 1983)	Superman Battles the Mightiest Men in the Universe!	Reprints stories from Action Comics #340 and Superman #242, 248, 281, 301.
#33 (February 1983)	Secret Origins of the Legion of Super-Heroes	Reprints stories from Adventure Comics #327, Superboy #172, 195, Superboy and the Legion of Super-Heroes #221, 233, 240.
#34 (March 1983)	Metal Men	Reprints stories from Showcase #37 and 39.
#35 (April 1983)	Year's Best Comics Stories	Reprints stories from DC Comics Presents #50, Detective Comics #514, The Fury of Firestorm #7, House of Mystery #310, Legion of Super-Heroes #286, The New Teen Titans #20, Saga of the Swamp Thing #4, and Sgt. Rock #361.
#36 (May 1983)	Superman vs. Kryptonite	Reprints stories from Action Comics #310, Adventure Comics #279, 290, and Superman #77, 106, 130, 139, 179, 195.
#37 (June 1983)	Funny Stuff	Reprints stories from Comic Cavalcade #62–63, Dodo and the Frog #81, Hollywood Funny Folks #46, Movietown's Animal Antics #35, 37, Peter Panda #2, 11, Peter Porkchops #12, Raccoon Kids #56, Stanley and His Monster #110, and The Three Mouseketeers #7, 14.
#38 (July 1983)	Superman vs. the Supernatural	Reprints stories from Action Comics #86, 269, 324, 379, 406, Superman #126, 129, Superman's Girl Friend, Lois Lane #108, and Superman's Pal Jimmy Olsen #81.
#39 (August 1983)	Binky and his Buddies	Reprints stories from Binky #73–74, 77–79, Binky's Buddies #9–10, Date with Debbi #4, 15, Swing with Scooter #18, 21, 24.
#40 (September 1983)	Superman: The Fabulous World of Krypton	Reprints stories from Superman #233, 236, 238, 240, 243, 246, 248, 260, 264, 266, 268, 275, 279, 282.
#41 (October 1983)	Sugar and Spike	New Sugar and Spike stories by Sheldon Mayer. Reprints story from Sugar and Spike #25.
#42 (November 1983)	Superman vs. the Aliens	Reprints stories from Action Comics #226, 234, 326, 342, Superman #84, 87, 102, 145, and Superman's Pal Jimmy Olsen #43.
#43 (December 1983)	Funny Stuff	Reprints stories from Comic Cavalcade #47, 61, Dodo and the Frog #84, Flippity and Flop #3, Funny Stuff #65, 72, Peter Panda #7, Peter Porkchops #15, Raccoon Kids #53, 60, and The Three Mouseketeers #20, 22.
#44 (January 1984)	Superboy and the Legion of Super-Heroes	Reprints stories from Adventure Comics #319–323 and Superman's Girl Friend, Lois Lane #50.
#45 (February 1984)	Binky and his Buddies	New stories by John Albano, Win Mortimer, and Henry Scarpelli. Reprints stories from Binky #79, Binky's Buddies #7–9, 12, Date with Debbi #13–15, and Swing with Scooter #30, 32.
#46 (March 1984)	Superman's Pal Jimmy Olsen	Reprints stories from Superman's Pal Jimmy Olsen #1–2, 37, 39, 101, 106, 132, 157.
#47 (April 1984)	Sugar and Spike	New Sugar and Spike story by Sheldon Mayer. Reprints stories from Sugar and Spike #1–2, 9, 27, 32, 88–91, 93–94.
#48 (May 1984)	Superman Team-Up Action	Reprints stories from Action Comics #421, 428, 444, Detective Comics #449, Superman #268, and World's Finest Comics #226, 236.
#49 (June 1984)	Funny Stuff	Reprints stories from Comic Cavalcade #56, 58, 60, Funny Stuff #67–68, 74, Hollywood Funny Folks #50, 53, Peter Panda #17, 29, Peter Porkchops #24, Raccoon Kids #59, Stanley and His Monster #112, and The Three Mouseketeers #1, 3.
#50 (July 1984)	Year's Best Superman Stories	Reprints stories from Action Comics #544, DC Comics Presents #59, 61, and Superman #388.
#51 (August 1984)	Batman Family	Reprints stories from Batman #232, 237 and Batman Family #11–13.
#52 (September 1984)	Year's Best Comics Stories	Reprints stories from Amethyst, Princess of Gemworld #1 Blackhawk #258, Detective Comics #533, Legion of Super-Heroes #305, The New Teen Titans #35, Saga of the Swamp Thing #16, and Sgt. Rock #376.
#53 (October 1984)	Binky and his Buddies	Reprints stories from Binky #78, 80, Date with Debbi #5, 7, 14–16, and Swing with Scooter #28–29, 34–35.
#54 (November 1984)	Superman Battles Weird Villains	Reprints stories from Action Comics #424, 432, DC Comics Presents #8, and Superman #310, 333, 335.
#55 (December 1984)	Funny Stuff	Reprints stories from Comic Cavalcade #49–50, 52, Hollywood Funny Folks #60, Nutsy Squirrel #61, 63–66, 68, Peter Porkchops #31–32, Peter Panda #12, and The Three Mouseketeers #15, 19, 24.
#56 (January 1985)	Superman vs. More Aliens	Reprints stories from Superman #177, 244, 246, 251, 258, 262.
#57 (February 1985)	Legion of Super-Heroes	Reprints stories from Adventure Comics #324–329.
#58 (March 1985)	Super Jrs. Holiday Special	New Super Jrs. story by Tom DeFalco and Vince Squeglia. Reprints stories from Sugar and Spike #51, 56, 68.
#59 (April 1985)	Superman Sagas	Reprints stories from DC Special Series #5 and Superman #150, 338.
#60 (May 1985)	Plop!	Reprints stories from House of Mystery #202 and Plop! #1, 4–7, 9–10, 12, 14, 17, 19, 23–24.
#61 (June 1985)	Year's Best Comics Stories	Reprints stories from Action Comics #554, Atari Force #8, Blue Devil #5, Green Lantern #177, Legion of Super-Heroes #308, The New Teen Titans #38, Saga of the Swamp Thing #21, and Sgt. Rock #391.
#62 (July 1985)	Year's Best Batman Stories	Reprints stories from Batman #372, Batman Special #1, and Detective Comics #537, 539.
#63 (August 1985)	Plop!	Reprints stories from House of Mystery #207, 251 and Plop! #1–5, 8–9, 11, 14, 16, 19, 22.
#64 (September 1985)	Legion of Super-Heroes	Reprints stories from Adventure Comics #330–334 and Superboy #117.
#65 (October 1985)	Sugar and Spike	Reprints stories from Sugar and Spike #37, 41, 46–48, 65, 72.
#66 (November 1985)	Superman Team-Up Action	Reprints stories from DC Comics Presents #4, 13–14 and World's Finest Comics #246–247.
#67 (December 1985)	Legion of Super-Heroes	Reprints stories from Adventure Comics #335–339 and Superboy #124–125.
#68 (January 1986)	Sugar and Spike	Reprints stories from Sugar and Spike #3, 37, 40, 43, 48, 55, 61, 67.
#69 (February 1986)	Year's Best Team Stories	Reprints stories from Batman and the Outsiders #19, Infinity, Inc. #13, Tales of the Legion of Super-Heroes #320, and Tales of the Teen Titans #50.
#70 (March 1986)	Binky's Buddies	Reprints stories from Binky #75, 77, Binky's Buddies #11, Date with Debbi #14, Leave it to Binky #71, and Swing with Scooter #31–33.
#71 (April 1986)	Year's Best Comics Stories	Reprints stories from Action Comics #565, Atari Force #20, Batman #383, Batman and the Outsiders #21, Blue Devil #8, DC Comics Presents #82 Green Lantern #187–188, Superman #408, Omega Men #26, and Saga of the Swamp Thing #34.

== Collected editions ==
- The New Teen Titans Archives Vol. 2 includes the New Teen Titans "Reunion" story from The Best of DC #18, 240 pages, May 2004, ISBN 978-1563899515
- The New Teen Titans Omnibus Vol. 1 includes the New Teen Titans "Reunion" story from The Best of DC #18, 684 pages, September 2011, ISBN 978-1401231088
- The Jack Kirby Omnibus Vol. 2 includes the Sandman story from The Best of DC #22, 624 pages, May 2013, ISBN 978-1401238339
- DC Through the 80s: The Experiments includes The Best of DC: Blue Ribbon Digest #58, 504 pages, May 2021, ISBN 978-1779507099

== See also ==
- DC Special Series
- Limited Collectors' Edition
