= Scribbly the Boy Cartoonist =

American DC Comics character

Scribbly

Publication information
- Publisher: Dell Comics; DC Comics
- First appearance: Popular Comics #6 (July 1936)
- Created by: Sheldon Mayer

In-story information
- Full name: Scribbly Jibbet
- Abilities: Cartooning

Scribbly the Boy Cartoonist is a comic book character created in 1936 by Sheldon Mayer, first appearing in Dell Comics and then moving to All-American Publications. Scribbly Jibbet is a semi-autobiographical character, presenting the adventures of a young man starting out in the cartooning business, and working for the Morning Dispatch newspaper. His stories were told around the Golden Age era, when American comic books were primarily anthologies telling more than one story in a magazine issue. Scribbly first appeared in the Popular Comics series, and then appeared in All-American Comics from 1939 to 1944. He was then revived in his own series, Scribbly, from 1948 to 1952.

All-American was one of the two companies that merged to form DC Comics in the 1940s, and, like all of DC's Golden Age characters, Scribbly was later considered part of the "Earth-Two" continuity. In 2015, Scribbly was briefly revived in DC Comics continuity by Paul Levitz, in the miniseries Convergence: World's Finest Comics.

== Publication history ==
=== Dell Comics ===
Sheldon Mayer began his career in cartooning at age fifteen, and he created Scribbly when he was nineteen. Mayer later explained: "Scribbly was a thing I dreamed up during my lunch hour one day in the cafeteria... I followed the old rule of writing only what you know about. What was more natural than writing about the adventures of a boy cartoonist?"

In 1936, Mayer worked for Max Gaines, one of the pioneers of modern comic books, and the teenager's job was to cut and paste comic strips from the Sunday comics pages into a comic book layout, which Gaines would sell to Dell Comics, to publish in one of their anthology books. Along with the recut strips, Mayer included a one-page strip of his own, Scribbly the Boy Cartoonist, and this was published in Dell's Popular Comics #6 (July 1936), alongside established strips like Smokey Stover, Winnie Winkle and Harold Teen. Jean-Paul Gabilliet said: "[Mayer] presented all the pages as Sunday panels because, at the time, the fact that a strip had previously appeared in a newspaper was perceived as an indicator of quality". Scribbly strips also appeared in Dell's The Funnies later in 1936.

Andrew J. Kunka describes the way that the strip began: "In the earliest Dell-published strips, Mayer's series begins with Scribbly as a kid known in his neighborhood for drawing cartoons on any surface he can find, including walls and fences (something Mayer did in his youth, as well). These drawings are discovered by a famous cartoonist, Ving Parker, who happens to be Scribbly's hero. Ving takes on Scribbly as an apprentice and even introduces him to real-life cartoonists like Lank Leonard (Mickey Finn) and Milt Gross. Scribbly's strip quickly catches on, and while he tries to work from home, his brother, Dinky, inadvertently gives him even more material. This early iteration of the series, before Mayer moves to All-American, eventually shifts to pure slapstick and less about Scribbly's cartooning experiences".

A remarkable aspect of the comic is that Scribbly is creating his own autobiographical comic: "Why Big Brothers Leave Home", about his relationship with the pesky Dinky (himself based on Mayer's little brother, Monte). In most of the Scribbly comics, "Why Big Brothers Leave Home" strip appeared as a topper strip, either at the top or the bottom of the page, drawn in cruder form to indicate that it was a cartoon-within-a-cartoon. Readers were encouraged to send in ideas for "Why Big Brothers Leave Home", collaborating with Scribbly on his autobiography.

At one point in the strip, "Why Big Brothers Leave Home" becomes so popular that Scribbly's principal creates his own autobiographical strip, "Scene in P.S. 83 as Seen by the Principal". A teacher in the school is unhappy with the way that she's portrayed in the principal's strip, and starts a cartoon of her own.

=== All-American Publications ===
In 1938, Gaines struck out on his own, founding All-American Publications. Mayer remained at the company as cartoonist and editor, and Scribbly appeared in All American Comics, beginning with the first issue (April 1939) and continuing until issue #59 (July 1944). Scribbly appeared on the All-American cover only three times, including issue #2.

Scribbly worked for the Morning Dispatch newspaper, although most of the action in the strip took place in his New York neighborhood. In issue #3 of All-American Comics, Mayer introduced Ma Hunkel, the owner of a local grocery store. In another autobiographical touch, Ma Hunkel was inspired by the owner of a boarding house where Mayer lived, Mrs. Lindenbaum. Scribbly was also established as the brother of Mortimer "Dinky" Jibbet of the Cyclone Kids.

With the skyrocketing popularity of the Superman comic in 1938, comic book publishers began featuring their own superhero characters. All-American Comics responded in 1939 with Gary Concord, the Ultra-Man, and followed in 1940 with Green Lantern and the Atom. The superhero trend was so powerful that in the Scribbly story in issue #20 (Nov 1940), Ma Hunkel became a superhero herself. In the story, Scribbly's little brother and Ma Hunkel's daughter Sisty are kidnapped, and the police are unable to locate them. Scribbly tells Ma about the Green Lantern, and she's inspired to don a costume and fight crime, calling herself the Red Tornado. By issue #23, the Red Tornado was sharing billing with Scribbly, and in #24, Ma's two kids joined the fight against crime, calling themselves "the Cyclone Twins". The kids scared criminals more than the Tornado herself. The series continued for three more years as "Scribbly & the Red Tornado".

Ron Goulart writes: "Anticipating Wonder Woman, that monumental creation of William Moulton Marston, possibly even influencing it, Mayer chose a woman to be his costumed avenger, remaking the formidable Ma Hunkel into the even more formidable Red Tornado. Actually the people in the strip never knew the true sex of the Tornado. They only knew that this bulky figure in the red flannels, bedroom slippers, cape, and inverted stew pot could be counted on to tackle all sorts of criminals from the biggest to the smallest".

Ma Hunkel had a one-page cameo in the first JSA story, in All-Star Comics #3. The story, "The First Meeting of the Justice Society of America", has the heroes get together and swap stories about their heroics. After hearing tales from the Flash, Hawkman, the Spectre and Hour Man, the group notices that Red Tornado is in the room. She explains that she was not invited to the meeting, but she came up on the fire escape. She gets a warm greeting from the group, but when they invite her to take her cape off and relax, she suddenly announces that she has to leave. The Flash laughs when he discovers that she tore her pants when she climbed in through the window. Later Justice Society stories established that Ma is an honorary member of the team, and in 2007, she returned to DC in Justice Society of America vol. 3 as the curator of the JSA's museum.

In All-American Comics #45 (Dec 1942), Mayer himself entered the comic strip. In "Sheldon Mayer Meets the Red Tornado", Scribbly, Ma Hunkel, the Cyclone Kids, and the neighborhood kids are complaining that their stories are boring and repetitive, so Mayer enters the comic panels to respond to their complaints. Disheartened by their criticism, Mayer tries to commit suicide by jumping from the top panel, but the Red Tornado rushes to catch him before he hits the bottom panel.

Outside of usually appearing in All-American Comics, Scribbly also appeared occasionally in Comic Cavalcade and the humor series Buzzy.

By issue #59 (July 1944), Mayer had grown tired of the characters, and openly admitted it in the introduction to that issue's story: "This goes on every issue — sometimes it's funny — sometimes it isn't — anyhow — I'm getting a little tired of it — just this once I'm gonna have some FUN! F'rinstance let's see what would happen if instead of people we draw these characters as animals..." Mayer then explained that Scribbly would be a horse in this issue — "maybe it's because I always know where to find a horse, but I go nuts finding an idea for Scribbly" — while Ma Hunkel would be a big fat chicken, Sisty as a chick and Dinky as a pony. This talking animal story was the last "Scribbly" story in All-American, with Mayer presumably tired of the strip altogether. Mayer's next project was a talking animal humor book, Funny Stuff, which launched with a Summer 1944 issue, with new stars the Three Mouseketeers and McSnurtle the Turtle, the Terrific Whatzit.

One final "Scribbly" chapter was published in the one-shot giant The Big All-American Comic Book, dated December 1944.

=== Solo comic ===
When Archie made teen humor comics popular, Scribbly was given his own bimonthly title, Scribbly, which ran for 15 issues, starting in September 1948. Mayer continued to write and draw the title, which is a romantic comedy about Scribbly trying to find a steady job and win the affection of his girlfriend Red Rigley, who was a famous cartoonist and coworker. The Red Tornado didn't appear in this reboot of the strip. Scribbly's sales were unimpressive, and Mayer was more interested in his new comic, Leave It to Binky, so the Scribbly comic was dropped in January 1952. Scribbly did appear as a backup feature in Leave it to Binky, as well as Buzzy, another DC teen comic. A guest appearance of Scribbly in Sugar and Spike #30 reveals that he finally married his redhead girlfriend Red Rigley and had a son, Scribbly Junior.

=== Convergence ===
In 2015, Scribbly was briefly revived in DC Comics continuity by Paul Levitz, in the miniseries Convergence: World's Finest Comics. In the series, he's depicted as transcribing the events of the Seven Soldiers of Victory by Paul Levitz, Jim Fern, Joe Rubenstein and Shannon Wheeler.

In an interview by Comic Book Resources, Paul Levitz explained his revival of the character:

"I built this around Scribbly Jibbet, whose name you will probably not remember. I guess he's the only character in the DC Universe who preceeds [sic] DC. Shelly Mayer created Scribbly originally, as a boy. His Scribbly stories -- in the view of Art Spiegelman, who is very knowledgeable on such -- is arguably the first autobiographical example of a cartoonist writing about a cartoonist in America. Shelly created it at first for Dell, but then he brought it to DC when he became the first editor of All-American Comics. He did a run in that comic and then did about 15 issues of Scribbly's own comic".

== Reception ==
Cartoonist and satirist Jules Feiffer wrote in The Great Comic Book Heroes (1965) that "the single unique stroke in the pre Detective Comics days was the creation, by Sheldon Mayer, of the humor strip Scribbly — an underrated, often brilliantly wild cartoon about a boy cartoonist with whom, needless to say, I identified like mad. I regret that it is not within the province of this book to give Mayer or Scribbly the space both of them deserve".

The revival of Scribbly in Convergence got a negative review by Greg McElhatton in Comic Book Resources, opining that it would have been better if the comic "focused more on what it's like to be a cartoonist in a superhero world". He also felt that some of the art for Scribbly was off.

In the 2013 book Comics About Cartoonists: Tales of the World's Oddest Profession, comics historian Craig Yoe described Scribbly as "the greatest out-of-the-inkwell cartoonist of all". The book reprints six pages of Scribbly comics.

== Other versions ==
In DC Comics satire children's comic book, DC Super Friends #29, he is referenced by a young Batman as a famous artist who draws his feet too small.
