= Ma Hunkel =

- Ma Hunkel as seen in Justice Society of America #23 (March 2009). Art by Jerry Ordway.

Publication information
- Publisher: DC Comics
- First appearance: As Ma Hunkel:: All-American Comics #3 (June 1939); As Red Tornado:: All-American Comics #20 (November 1940)
- Created by: Sheldon Mayer

In-story information
- Alter ego: Abigail Mathilda "Ma" Hunkel
- Team affiliations: Justice Society of America; Justice League; All-Star Squadron
- Notable aliases: Red Tornado
- Abilities: Great cooking skills Surprising physical strength

Abigail Mathilda "Ma" Hunkel is a fictional superhero appearing in American comic books published by DC Comics. Debuting during the Golden Age of Comic Books, she first appeared in her civilian identity in All-American Publications' All-American Comics #3 (June 1939), created by Sheldon Mayer, and became the first character to be known as the Red Tornado in All-American Comics #20 (November 1940). As the Red Tornado, she was one of the first superhero parodies, as well as one of the first female superheroes and (when occasionally disguised as a man) the first cross-dressing heroine, debuting months after Madame Fatal, the first cross-dressing male hero.

She was commonly associated with humor title character Scribbly the Boy Cartoonist, debuting as a supporting character of him, then sharing titles alongside Scribbly with the Red Tornado alias occasionally. Ma then was more recurringly affiliated with the Justice Society of America during the debut of the team and consistently still is in modern interpretation within DC Comics publications where she often shows off her cooking abilities to them. She is also depicted as the grandmother of Maxine Hunkel.

== Publication history ==
Initially introduced as simply Ma Hunkel, she originated in Sheldon Mayer's semi-autobiographical humor feature in All-American Comics #3 as a supporting character of Scribbly the Boy Cartoonist.

With the skyrocketing popularity of the Superman comic in 1938, comic book publishers began featuring their own superhero characters. All-American Comics responded in 1939 with Gary Concord, the Ultra-Man, and followed in 1940 with Green Lantern and the Atom. The superhero trend was so powerful that in the Scribbly story in issue #20 (Nov 1940), Ma Hunkel became a superhero herself. In the story, Scribbly's little brother Dinky and Ma Hunkel's daughter Sisty are kidnapped, and the police are unable to locate them. Scribbly tells Ma about the Green Lantern, and she's inspired to don a costume and fight crime, calling herself the Red Tornado.

The character was immediately popular, and eclipsed Scribbly himself. By issue #23, the Red Tornado was sharing billing with Scribbly, and in #24, Dinky and Sisty joined the fight against crime, calling themselves "the Cyclone Twins". The series continued for three more years as "Scribbly & the Red Tornado".

The feature ran through All-American Comics #59, in 1944, the year DC Comics absorbed All-American Publications.

Ron Goulart writes: "Anticipating Wonder Woman, that monumental creation of William Moulton Marston, possibly even influencing it, Mayer chose a woman to be his costumed avenger, remaking the formidable Ma Hunkel into the even more formidable Red Tornado. Actually the people in the strip never knew the true sex of the Tornado. They only knew that this bulky figure in the red flannels, bedroom slippers, cape, and inverted stew pot could be counted on to tackle all sorts of criminals from the biggest to the smallest".

In 1967, Mayer briefly revived the concept in issues of Sugar and Spike, with both kids and Little Arthur appearing at various times as "Tornado-Tot".

The character reappeared in a three-page "Scribbly" story by Mayer in DC's Secret Origins #29 (Aug. 1986). She had a one-panel appearance in Animal Man "Deus Ex Machine", in a sort of limbo for characters who at the time weren't written into mainstream continuity.

In Alex Ross's classic 1996 graphic novel Kingdom Come, set in an alternative DC future, the "Original Red Tornado" is identified as Ma Hunkel: she can just be seen at the top-left hand side of the Justice League line-up which includes Superman and Norman McCay. In issue #3, (page 135 of the collected edition), panel 1, she can be seen on a balcony looking down at Superman and McCay and wearing a far more sophisticated, armour-like costume.

She appeared briefly in 1998's DC Universe Holiday Bash II special, in the story "I Left My Heart at the Justice Society Canteen", and in All-Star Comics 80-Page Giant #1 (Sept. 1999), in a story, "Way of the Amazon", in which Ma Hunkel takes valorous center stage amid Liberty Belle, Phantom Lady and Wonder Woman. She has continued to appear through the mid-2000s, mainly as a supporting character in Justice Society of America.

== Fictional character biography ==
Ma Hunkel appearing as Red Tornado in the first appearance of her as a superhero, art by Sheldon Mayer.

In the original comics in the 1940s, Ma Hunkel is a working mother whose costume consists of longjohns and a cooking pot on her head. She adopts the identity of the Red Tornado to fight local criminals in her New York City neighborhood, inspired by her son's admiration for the superhero Green Lantern. The character's popularity was such that she was given a cameo in the first adventure of the Justice Society of America, visiting the JSA's headquarters but being forced by a humorous mishap, her pants splitting, to leave without having the chance to apply for membership. Later Justice Society stories have declared Ma to be an honorary member of the team. Due to her bright red costume and rotund build, she is sometimes jokingly referred to as the Red Tomato.

Ma was later joined by a pair of sidekicks known as the Cyclone Kids, consisting of her daughter Amelia "Sisty" Hunkel and neighbor Mortimer "Dinky" Jibbet (brother of boy cartoonist Scribbly, the star of the comic book feature in which the Red Tornado debuted).

Ma Hunkel returned in JSA #55 (February 2004). This story reveals that Ma had been in the Witness Protection Program since 1950. Senior JSA members Green Lantern, the Flash, Hawkman, and Wildcat find Ma to tell her that she can come out of hiding, as the last member of the gang against whom she testified in 1950 has died. Ma subsequently becomes caretaker of the JSA's Manhattan museum/headquarters. She does not, however, resume her crimefighting activities as the Red Tornado.

Her daughter and son-in-law, the former Cyclone Kids, briefly have their own costumed adventures, starting in the title Young Justice. They band together with other Golden Age sidekicks out of concern for the safety of younger superheroes.

Ma's wind-controlling granddaughter, Maxine Hunkel, joins the JSA in Justice Society of America Vol. 3 #1 (February 2007). In Justice Society of America Vol. 3 #3 (March 2007), Maxine adopts the alias "Cyclone".

Ma still has some fighting ability, using a mace and gas weaponry to help the younger JSA stun and delay members of the invading Injustice Society. She is taken hostage and frozen by the villain Icicle. She only suffers a mild cold as the team's plans was not to kill or injure but steal from the JSA.

Maxine is responsible for the continuation of the Society as a viable team. When supernatural entities obliterate the brownstone, Jay Garrick believes this was a sign to end the team and move on. Maxine convinces him that such an attitude was nonsensical and the Society is more than just a headquarters.

In Dark Nights: Death Metal, Ma Hunkel is stated to have been the guardian of the first Justice Society of America headquarters. Her name is the password needed to access Valhalla Cemetery, where fallen superheroes are entombed.

== Powers and abilities ==
In her prime, Ma Hunkel was a surprisingly strong woman. Many who encountered her often believed that the Red Tornado was, in fact, a man, a notion that helped protect Ma's secret identity on more than one occasion.

Furthermore, Ma is a skilled cook.

== Other versions ==
=== Kingdom Come ===
In the Kingdom Come timeline, an older Ma Hunkel wielding a more sophisticated armor version of the Red Tornado costume joins the re-formed Justice League under Superman.

=== World Without Young Justice ===
In the "World Without Young Justice" reality, Red Tornado was brought out of retirement by Impulse. She helps to distract Bedlam so that Impulse can have one of his clones restore the timeline.

== In other media ==
- Ma Hunkel makes a cameo appearance in the Smallville two-part episode "Absolute Justice", portrayed by Deborah Cole.
- Ma Hunkel appears in Smallville Season 11. Following the reformation of the Justice Society, she becomes the caretaker of their brownstone.
- Ma Hunkel appears in the Black Adam prequel comic Black Adam - The Justice Society Files: Cyclone.

== Collected editions ==
The Red Tornado is one of seven JSA-related heroes whose solo appearances are collected in an anthology entry in the DC Archive Editions series:

| Title | Material collected |
|---|---|
| JSA All-Stars Archives Vol. 1 HC (2007) | All-American Comics (1939 series) #20–24 |
