= The Justice Society Returns =

DC Comics storyline

- Cover The Justice Society Returns (2001), trade paperback edition, art by Dave Johnson.
- Publisher: DC Comics
- Publication date: May 1999
- Genre: Superhero
Title(s)
Adventure Comics vol. 2, #1
All-American Comics vol. 2, #1
All-Star Comics vol. 2, #1–2
National Comics vol. 2, #1
Sensation Comics vol. 2, #1
Smash Comics vol. 2, #1
Star-Spangled Comics vol. 2, #1
Thrilling Comics vol. 2, #1
- The Justice Society Returns: ISBN 1-4012-0090-7

"The Justice Society Returns" is a nine issue story arc that ran through a number of comic books published by DC Comics in 1999, reviving the Golden Age superhero team, which had previously been revived in the 1980s.

== Publication history ==
The comics involved in this multi-title crossover were the retro-revival issues Adventure Comics #1, All-American Comics #1, All-Star Comics #1–2, National Comics #1, Sensation Comics #1, Smash Comics #1, Star-Spangled Comics #1, and Thrilling Comics #1. The names included those of comics released by All-American Publications, one of the three companies that merged to form the present-day DC, as well as Quality Comics, the rights to which DC purchased in the 1950s.

== Plot synopsis ==
During World War II, Nazi sympathizers begin a ritual using Dr. Occult to bring a being known as Koth to Earth, in order to ensure an Axis victory in the war. Hourman and several magical heroes attempt to stop them, but are unsuccessful. The spell goes wrong, however, and the Nazis release a villain known as Stalker, whose sole purpose is to end life everywhere. The magical heroes are either killed or captured by Stalker, and only Hourman and Dr. Occult escape. Hourman informs the rest of the Justice Society of America about Stalker, and the group battles with him in Washington, DC. The JSA manages to wound Stalker enough so that he must create seven disciples (the men who originally brought Stalker to Earth) to carry on his work while he recuperates. The JSA splits up to battle each of the disciples. Each team is able to defeat a disciple. Dr. Occult gathers everyone together to battle Stalker in Antarctica, where Stalker is building a machine that will destroy all life on Earth. After a long fight, the machine is destroyed and Stalker is defeated.

== Collected editions ==
The story arc was collected in the trade paperback The Justice Society Returns (ISBN 1-4012-0090-7), published by DC Comics in 2003.
