= Limited Collectors' Edition =

American comic book series

- Cover to Limited Collectors' Edition C-20, the first of the series (Christmas 1972); art by Rube Grossman.

Publication information
- Publisher: DC Comics
- Format: Ongoing series
- Publication date: 1972 – 1978
- No. of issues: Limited Collectors' Edition: 32; Famous First Edition: 10; All-New Collectors' Edition: 7

Creative team
- Written by: List: John Albano, E. Nelson Bridwell, Gerry Conway, Leo Dorfman, Mark Evanier, Paul Levitz, Sheldon Mayer, Dennis O'Neil
- Penciller: List: Neal Adams, Rich Buckler, E. R. Cruz, Ric Estrada, José Luis García-López, Mike Grell, Sheldon Mayer, Bob Oksner, Frank Redondo, Nestor Redondo, Gerry Talaoc, Alex Toth
- Inker: List: Dan Adkins, Terry Austin, Vince Colletta, Dick Giordano, Tenny Henson, Bob Oksner, Nestor Redondo, Alex Toth, Wally Wood

Limited Collectors' Edition is an American comic book series published by DC Comics from 1972 to 1978. It usually featured reprints of previously published stories but a few issues contained new material. The series was published in an oversized 10″ x 14″ tabloid (or "treasury") format.

== Publication history ==
Limited Collectors' Edition was launched with a collection of Rudolph the Red-Nosed Reindeer stories which went on sale October 24, 1972. DC Comics vice president Sol Harrison had suggested the format stating that "we could create a tabloid size comic that would stand out on the newsstand". Limited Collectors' Edition shared its numbering with two other treasury format series, Famous First Edition and All-New Collectors' Edition. The final issues of the latter two series were tie-ins to the release of Superman: The Movie. DC later published treasuries as part of DC Special Series in 1981 and as a number of one-shots from 1999 to 2003 primarily produced by Paul Dini and Alex Ross.

In 2020, DC put out a new Famous First Edition, C-63, which reprinted in hardcover the first issue of New Fun Comics, which launched the company that became DC.

In 2025, DC released a new treasury edition as part of their “Summer of Superman” publishing initiative.

== The issues ==
Issue	Date	Title	Notes
C-20	Christmas 1972	"Rudolph the Red-Nosed Reindeer"	Reprints stories from Rudolph the Red-Nosed Reindeer #2, 4-7.
C-21	Summer 1973	"Shazam!"	Reprints stories from Captain Marvel Adventures #19, 68, 115, 121; Captain Marvel, Jr. #11; and Marvel Family #85.
C-22	Fall 1973	"Tarzan"	Reprints stories from Tarzan #207-210.
C-23	Winter 1973	"House of Mystery"	Reprints stories from House of Mystery #175, 179-180, 182, 186, and 202.
C-24	1973	"Rudolph the Red-Nosed Reindeer"	Reprints stories from Rudolph the Red-Nosed Reindeer #3, 5, and 8 and Rudolph, the Red-Nosed Reindeer Annual #13.
C-25	1974	"Batman"	Reprints stories from Batman #4, 14, 24, and 221 and Detective Comics #355 and 404.
C-27	1974	"Shazam!"	Reprints stories from Captain Marvel Adventures #25, 53, 121, 127; Captain Marvel, Jr. #54; and Marvel Family #2, 20-21, and 82.
C-29	1974	"Tarzan"	Reprints stories from Tarzan #219-223.
C-31	October–November 1974	"Superman"	Reprints stories from Action Comics #22, 29; Superman #60, 142, 204 and The Amazing World of Superman, Metropolis Edition. Cover art by H. J. Ward reproduced from a photograph of the original painting.
C-32	December 1974-January 1975	"Ghosts"	Reprints stories from Ghosts #1, 3-6. New material by writer Leo Dorfman and artists Gerry Talaoc, E. R. Cruz, and Frank Redondo.
C-33	February–March 1975	"Rudolph the Red-Nosed Reindeer"	Reprints story from Rudolph the Red-Nosed Reindeer #9. New story by writer/penciler Sheldon Mayer and inker Tenny Henson.
C-34	February–March 1975	"Christmas with the Super-Heroes"	Reprints stories from Batman #239; Captain Marvel Adventures #69; Teen Titans #13; and Action Comics #117. Previously unpublished "Angel and the Ape" story by writer John Albano and artists Bob Oksner and Wally Wood.
C-35	April–May 1975	"Shazam!"	Reprints stories from Captain Marvel Adventures #100, 129, 148 and Marvel Family #17. Photo cover features Jackson Bostwick from the Shazam! television series.
C-36	June–July 1975	"The Bible"	New material adapting stories from the Book of Genesis by writer Sheldon Mayer and artist Nestor Redondo.
C-37	August–September 1975	"Batman"	Reprints stories from Batman #8, 43, 45; World's Finest Comics #3; and the Batman comic strip.
C-38	October–November 1975	"Superman"	Reprints stories from Superman #40, 48, 157 and Action Comics #315-316.
C-39	October–November 1975	"Secret Origins of Super-Villains"	Reprints stories from Detective Comics #168; Adventure Comics #271; Showcase #8; Whiz Comics #15; and Superman #249.
C-40	December 1975-January 1976	"Dick Tracy"	Reprints the Dick Tracy comic strip from December 21, 1943 to May 17, 1944.
C-41	December 1975-January 1976	"Super Friends"	Reprints stories from Justice League of America #36 and 61. New framing sequence by writer E. Nelson Bridwell and artist Alex Toth.
C-42	February–March 1976	"Rudolph the Red-Nosed Reindeer"	New Rudolph the Red-Nosed Reindeer stories by writer/penciler Sheldon Mayer and inker Tenny Henson.
C-43	February–March 1976	"Christmas with the Super-Heroes"	Reprints stories from Superman's Christmas Adventure #1; Batman #219; House of Mystery #191; Sensation Comics #14; and Adventure Comics #82.
C-44	June–July 1976	"Batman"	Reprints stories from Detective Comics #329 and 397 and Batman #31 and 83. Cover art by Wally Fax.
C-45	June–July 1976	"More Secret Origins Super-Villains"	Reprints stories from Batman #62; The Flash #105; Superboy #78; and Wonder Woman #6.
C-46	August–September 1976	"Justice League of America"	Reprints stories from Justice League of America #24 and 34.
C-47	August–September 1976	"Superman Salutes the Bicentennial"	Reprints Tomahawk stories from Star Spangled Comics #121, 126-127; More Fun Comics #70; and Tomahawk #45. These include the titles: "Adventure in New York"/"The Magic Tomahawk"/"The First Sub"/"Frontier Theatre"/"The Battle of the Master Woodsmen".
C-48	1976	"Superman vs. the Flash"	Reprints stories from Superman #199 and The Flash #175. Six-page new feature on Superman's Fortress of Solitude by Neal Adams.
C-49	October–November 1976	"Superboy and the Legion of Super-Heroes"	Reprints stories from Adventure Comics #369-370.
C-50	Christmas 1976	"Rudolph the Red-Nosed Reindeer"	New Rudolph the Red-Nosed Reindeer stories by writer/penciler Sheldon Mayer and inker Tenny Henson.
C-51	August 1977	"Batman"	Reprints stories from Batman #232 and 242-244.
C-52	1977	"The Best of DC"	Reprints stories from Batman #237; House of Mystery #201; The Flash #148; Our Army at War #241; Tomahawk #136; and Superman #156.
C-57	1978	"Welcome Back, Kotter"	Reprints stories from Welcome Back, Kotter #1, 3, and 4. New story by writer Mark Evanier and artists Ric Estrada and Bob Oksner.
C-59	1978	"Batman's Strangest Cases"	Reprints stories from The Brave and the Bold #93; Swamp Thing #7; Batman #227 and 250; and Detective Comics #410.

Several planned features for Limited Collectors' Edition were never published. These include several projects by writer/artist Sheldon Mayer. Mayer had been working on an adaptation of The Wizard of Oz but DC's then-publisher Carmine Infantino canceled the project upon learning of a similar adaptation by Marvel Comics. The two companies published the project jointly and the adaptation was crafted by Marvel's Roy Thomas and John Buscema instead. Mayer also worked on a follow-up to "The Bible" issue of Limited Collectors' Edition titled "The Story of Jesus" as well as "Rudolph's Easter Parade", an Easter-themed Rudolph the Red-Nosed Reindeer issue. Neither project was published. "The Legend of King Arthur" by writer Gerry Conway and artist Nestor Redondo was a four-issue storyline which was advertised as "Coming Soon" in DC comic books dated September 1975, but the series was never published. A second volume of "The Best of DC" would have included stories reprinted from The Brave and the Bold #42; All-Star Western #11; Superman #247; and Green Lantern #75 but was canceled as part of the DC Implosion.

== Famous First Edition ==
Issue	Date	Title	Notes
C–26	1974	"Action Comics #1"	Exact reprint of Action Comics #1 (June 1938).
C–28	1974	"Detective Comics #27"	Exact reprint of Detective Comics #27 (May 1939).
C–30	1974	"Sensation Comics #1"	Exact reprint of Sensation Comics #1 (January 1942).
F–4	October–November 1974	"Whiz Comics #2"	Exact reprint of Whiz Comics #2 (February 1940).
F–5	February–March 1975	"Batman #1"	Exact reprint of Batman #1 (Spring 1940).
F–6	April–May 1975	"Wonder Woman #1"	Exact reprint of Wonder Woman #1 (Summer 1942).
F–7	June–July 1975	"All Star Comics #3"	Exact reprint of All Star Comics #3 (Winter 1940–1941)
F–8	August–September 1975	"Flash Comics #1"	Exact reprint of Flash Comics #1 (January 1940.
C–61	March 1979	"Superman #1"	Exact reprint of Superman #1 (Summer 1939).
C–63	2020	"New Fun #1"	Exact reprint of New Fun #1 (February 1935).

Famous First Edition was a series of oversized reprints of original Golden Age comics. All but two (#F–7, All-Star Comics #3 and #F–8, Flash Comics #1) included full-size glossy cover-stock reprints of the front and back covers in addition to the usual cardstock outer covers. Famous First Edition reprinted the comics in their entirety, including any paid advertising and other features that appeared in the original. Several issues of Famous First Edition were also published in hardcover editions by Lyle Stuart, Inc. The Grand Comics Database only lists hardcover versions for issues #C–26 (Action Comics #1), #C–28 (Detective Comics #27), #C–30 (Sensation Comics #1), #F–4 (Whiz Comics #2), and #F–6 (Wonder Woman #1) while the Overstreet Comic Book Price Guide includes a listing for a hardcover version of #F–5 (Batman #1) with a notation of "exists?" The reprint of New Fun #1 published in 2020 was released in a hardcover edition only.

== All-New Collectors' Edition ==
Issue	Date	Title	Notes
C–53	January 1978	"Rudolph the Red-Nosed Reindeer"	New Rudolph the Red-Nosed Reindeer stories by writer/penciler Sheldon Mayer and inker Tenny Henson.
C–54	1978	"Superman vs. Wonder Woman"	New story by writer Gerry Conway and artists José Luis García-López and Dan Adkins.
C–55	1978	"Superboy and the Legion of Super-Heroes"	New story by writer Paul Levitz and artists Mike Grell and Vince Colletta featuring the wedding of Saturn Girl and Lightning Lad.
C–56	1978	"Superman vs. Muhammad Ali"	New story by Dennis O'Neil which was adapted and penciled by Neal Adams with figure inks by Dick Giordano and background inks by Terry Austin.
C–58	April 1978	"Superman vs. Shazam!"	New story by writer Gerry Conway and artists Rich Buckler and Dick Giordano.
C–60	1978	"Rudolph's Summer Fun"	New Rudolph the Red-Nosed Reindeer stories by writer/penciler Sheldon Mayer and inker Tenny Henson.
C–62	1979	"Superman: The Movie"	Photos and background material from the film.

Three features originally intended for All-New Collectors' Edition were published elsewhere due to the title's cancellation as part of the DC Implosion. "Superman's Life Story" by Martin Pasko and Curt Swan was published in Action Comics #500 (October 1979). The planned 1978 Rudolph the Red-Nosed Reindeer tabloid's material appeared in The Best of DC #4 (March–April 1980). A Justice League story by Gerry Conway and Rich Buckler saw print in Justice League of America #210–212 (January 1983–March 1983).

== DC Special Series ==
Issue	Date	Title	Notes
25	Summer 1981	"Superman II"	Photos and background material from the film.
26	Summer 1981	"Superman and His Incredible Fortress of Solitude"	"Secrets of Superman's Fortress" by Roy Thomas, Ross Andru, and Romeo Tanghal.
27	Fall 1981	Batman vs. the Incredible Hulk	DC-Marvel crossover by Len Wein, José Luis García-López, and Dick Giordano.

== Other DC treasuries ==
- The Amazing World of Superman: Metropolis Edition (1973): Reprints stories from Action Comics #210; Superman #170; and Superboy #153, 161, and 169. New story by writer E. Nelson Bridwell and artists Carmine Infantino, Curt Swan, and Murphy Anderson.
- MGM's Marvelous Wizard of Oz (1975): The first joint publishing venture between Marvel Comics and DC Comics. Comics adaptation of the Metro-Goldwyn-Mayer film by Roy Thomas, John Buscema, and Tony DeZuniga.
- Superman vs. The Amazing Spider-Man (January 1976): The first crossover between DC and Marvel characters, written by Gerry Conway and drawn by Ross Andru and Dick Giordano.
- Superman: Peace on Earth (January 1999): One-shot by writer Paul Dini and artist Alex Ross.
- Superman/Fantastic Four: The Infinite Destruction (April 1999): Intercompany crossover by writer/penciler Dan Jurgens and inker Art Thibert.
- Batman: War on Crime (November 1999): One-shot by writer Paul Dini and artist Alex Ross.
- JLA: Heaven's Ladder (October 2000): One-shot by writer Mark Waid and artists Bryan Hitch and Paul Neary.
- Shazam! Power of Hope (November 2000): One-shot by writer Paul Dini and artist Alex Ross.
- Wonder Woman: Spirit of Truth (November 2001): One-shot by writer Paul Dini and artist Alex Ross.
- JLA: Secret Origins (November 2002): One-shot by writer Paul Dini and artist Alex Ross.
- JLA: Liberty and Justice (November 2003): One-shot by writer Paul Dini and artist Alex Ross.
- Superman Treasury 2025: Hero for All (July 2025): One-shot by writer Dan Jurgens and artist Bruno Redondo.

== Collected editions ==
- Adventures of Superman: José Luis García-López includes All-New Collectors' Edition #C–54, 360 pages, April 2013, ISBN 978-1401238568
- The Amazing World of Superman collects The Amazing World of Superman, 64 pages, April 2021, ISBN 978-1779509185
- The Bible collects Limited Collectors' Edition #C–36, 72 pages, May 2012, ISBN 1401234259
- Shazam! The World's Mightiest Mortal Vol. 2 includes All-New Collectors' Edition #C–58, 328 pages, April 2020, ISBN 978-1779501172
- Superboy and the Legion of Super-Heroes Vol. 1 includes All-New Collectors' Edition #C–55, 312 pages, June 2017, ISBN 978-1401272913
- Superman vs. Muhammad Ali collects All-New Collectors' Edition #C–56, 80 pages, November 2010, ISBN 9781401228729 (treasury size); ISBN 9781401228415 (comic book size)
- Superman vs. Shazam! includes All-New Collectors' Edition #C–58, 192 pages, March 2013, ISBN 978-1401238216
- Superman vs. Wonder Woman collects All-New Collectors' Edition #C–54, 72 pages, December 2020, ISBN 978-1779507204
- Wonder Woman: Spirit of Truth collects Wonder Woman: Spirit of Truth, 72 pages, March 2020, ISBN 978-1401291082
- The World's Greatest Super-Heroes collects Superman: Peace on Earth, Batman: War on Crime, Shazam!: Power of Hope, Wonder Woman: Spirit of Truth, JLA: Secret Origins and JLA: Liberty and Justice, 396 pages, July 2005, ISBN 1401202543

== See also ==
- Marvel Treasury Edition - a similar series published by Marvel Comics
