= Sheldon Mayer =

American comic creator (1917–1991)

- Sheldon Mayer self-portrait from the cover of The Amazing World of DC Comics #5 (March–April 1975)
- Born: April 1, 1917 New York City, U.S.
- Died: December 21, 1991 (aged 74) Copake, New York, U.S.
- Areas: Writer, Penciller, Editor
- Notable works: Black Orchid; Funny Stuff; Scribbly the Boy Cartoonist; Sugar and Spike; The Three Mouseketeers
- Awards: Jack Kirby Hall of Fame; Will Eisner Comic Book Hall of Fame; Bill Finger Award for Excellence in Comic Book Writing

Sheldon Mayer (/ˈmeɪ.ər/; April 1, 1917 – December 21, 1991) was an American comics artist, writer, and editor. One of the earliest employees of Major Malcolm Wheeler-Nicholson's National Allied Publications, Mayer produced almost all of his comics work for the company that would become known as DC Comics.

He is among those credited with rescuing the unsold Superman comics strip from the rejection pile.

Mayer was inducted into the comic book industry's Jack Kirby Hall of Fame in 1992 and the Will Eisner Comic Book Hall of Fame in 2000.

== Early life and career ==
Mayer was born in Harlem, New York City, to a Jewish family. He married Ruth Armstrong in 1943, and they had two children, Merrily and Lanney.

Sheldon Mayer's career in the days before comic books was a diverse one. He worked as writer and artist on "scores of titles" for a juvenile audience circa 1932–33, before joining the Fleischer animation studios as an "opaquer" in 1934, at the age of seventeen.

He began working for National Allied Publications (Major Malcolm Wheeler-Nicholson's initial company, later known as DC Comics) shortly after it was founded, in 1935, writing and drawing stories and "thus becoming one of the very first contributors [of original material] to comic books."

Between 1936 and 1938, Mayer worked for Dell Comics, producing illustrations, house advertisements and covers for titles including Popular Comics, The Comics and The Funnies. Also in 1936, he joined the McClure Syndicate "as an editor working for comics industry pioneer M.C. Gaines." While working for the McClure Syndicate, Mayer came across Jerry Siegel and Joe Shuster's unsold Superman comics strip, which he "immediately fell in love with." He recalled in a 1985 book that, "The syndicated press rejected it about fifteen times. I was singing [its] praises so much that in 1938 Gaines finally took the strip up to Harry Donenfeld, who was looking for original material to run in his new title, Action Comics," where the soon-to-be iconic character debuted as the lead feature of the first issue. Action Comics editor Vin Sullivan is also among those credited with discovering Superman. Mayer said,

I was crazy about Superman for the same reason I liked The Scarlet Pimpernel, Zorro, and The Desert Song. The mystery man and his alter ego are two distinct characters to be played off against each other. The Scarlet Pimpernel's alter ego was scared of the sight of blood, a hopeless dandy: no one would have suspected he was a hero. The same goes for Superman.

== All-American Comics ==
(Left to right) William Moulton Marston, H. G. Peter, Sheldon Mayer and Max Gaines in 1942.

In 1939, "Gaines left McClure to enter into a partnership with National Periodical Publications," and Mayer went with him, becoming the first editor of the All-American Publications line, then run as a separate entity from National/DC, publishers of Superman and Batman. Mayer edited and participated in the creation of - among others - the Flash (in Flash Comics), Green Lantern, Hawkman, Wonder Woman and All-Star Comics, home to the Justice Society of America. Comics historian Les Daniels noted that "This was obviously a great notion, since it offered readers a lot of headliners for a dime, and also the fun of watching fan favorites interact."

Among his non-superhero work, Mayer assisted with lettering and logo creation on several All-American titles, and drew a number of covers for the "Mutt and Jeff" reprints appearing in the companies flagship title All-American Comics (1939–1958). Having created the semi-autobiographical strip Scribbly the Boy Cartoonist for Dell Comics in 1936, where the feature appeared in The Funnies #2–29 and Popular Comics #6–9), Mayer moved "Scribbly" to All-American Publications in 1939. Soon afterward, the featured included the supporting character of "Ma" Hunkel, who would go on to become the Golden Age incarnation of the Red Tornado, with Mayer writing, penciling and inking the renamed Scribbly and the Red Tornado for All-American Comics between 1941 and 1944 when All-American merged with National. Mayer launched several talking animal titles including Funny Stuff (Summer 1944), Animal Antics (March 1946), and Funny Folks (April 1946).

== Scribbly ==
Scribbly the Boy Cartoonist is a comic book character created in 1936 by Sheldon Mayer, first appearing in Dell Comics.

== Editorial retirement ==
Mayer retired from editing in 1948, "to devote himself full-time to cartooning". He began to write and draw a number of humor comics for National, including the features The Three Mouseketeers, Leave It to Binky, a teenage humor book, and Sugar and Spike. Leave It to Binky debuted in February 1948 while Scribbly received its own title in August 1948. He also created the backup feature "Doodles Duck", starring a dimwitted, easily angered instigator and his smarter, calmer nephew Lemuel, in Animal Antics #40 (Sept. 1952). This is unrelated to Howie Post's early DC creation Doodles Duck.

Sugar and Spike proved to be one of Mayer's longest-lasting strips, starring two babies who could communicate in baby talk that adults could not understand. Mayer even signed the stories he drew, something rare at National Periodical Publications in the late 1950s when Sugar and Spike debuted.

In the 1970s, when failing eyesight limited his drawing ability, he continued to work for National/DC, contributing scripts to the companies horror and mystery magazines, including most notably House of Mystery, House of Secrets and Forbidden Tales of Dark Mansion. With artist Tony DeZuniga, he co-created the "Black Orchid" feature which ran in Adventure Comics #428–430 in 1973. Mayer wrote and drew several "Rudolph the Red-Nosed Reindeer" treasuries starting in 1972. These were published as Limited Collectors' Edition C–24, C–33, C–42, C–50 and All-New Collectors' Edition C–53, C–60. Additionally, one digest format edition was published as The Best of DC #4 (March–April 1980). In 1978, Mayer wrote and drew a "How to Draw Batman Booklet" as part of an ongoing debate with DC editor Paul Levitz regarding continuity in comic books. In the 50th anniversary publication Fifty Who Made DC Great, Mayer is cited as still writing and drawing "for the company that first published his great discovery, Superman, forty-seven years ago."

After successful cataract surgery, Mayer returned to drawing Sugar and Spike stories for the international market from 1978 to 1983; only a few have been reprinted in the United States. The American reprints appeared in the digest sized comics series The Best of DC #29, 41, 47, 58, 65, and 68. In 1992, Sugar and Spike #99 was published as part of the DC Silver Age Classics series; featuring two previously unpublished stories by Mayer. DC writer and executive Paul Levitz has described Sugar and Spike as being "Mayer's most charming and enduring creation" while novelist and Sandman creator Neil Gaiman has stated "Sheldon Mayer's Sugar and Spike series...is the most charming thing I've ever seen in comics."

DC attempted to license Sugar and Spike as a syndicated newspaper strip but was unsuccessful. Sales on the "Sugar and Spike" issues of The Best of DC were strong enough that DC announced plans for a new ongoing series featuring the characters. The project was never launched for unknown reasons.

== Awards ==
Mayer received an Inkpot Award in 1976. He was posthumously inducted into the Jack Kirby Hall of Fame in 1992 and the Will Eisner Comic Book Hall of Fame in 2000. He was posthumously awarded the Bill Finger Award for Excellence in Comic Book Writing in 2025.

== Bibliography ==
=== Centaur Publications ===
- Comics Magazine #1 (1936)

=== DC Comics ===
- Adventure Comics #428–430 (Black Orchid); #431 (writer) (1973–1974)
- All-American Comics #1–5 (writer/artist) (1939–1944)
- All New Collectors' Edition #C–53, C–60 (Rudolph the Red-Nosed Reindeer) (writer/artist) (1977–1978)
- All Star Comics #3–6, 8 (Justice Society of America) (artist) (1940–1941)
- Best of DC #4 (Rudolph the Red-Nosed Reindeer); #29, 41, 47 (Sugar and Spike) (writer/artist) (1980–1984)
- Big All-American Comic Book #1 (writer/artist) (1944)
- Buzzy #32–34, 39 (writer/artist) (1950–1951)
- Comic Cavalcade #4, 7, 40–63 (artist) (1943–1954)
- DC Silver Age Classics #10 (Sugar and Spike) (writer/artist) (1992)
- Dodo and the Frog #80–81, 83–90, 92 (artist) (1954–1957)
- Forbidden Tales of Dark Mansion #12 (writer) (1973)
- Funny Stuff #1, 3, 5, 18, 28, 55, 57–58, 61–62, 64–65, 68, 70, 72, 74–79 (writer/artist) (1944–1954)
- Ghosts #111 (writer) (1982)
- Hollywood Funny Folks #28–35, 37–40, 43–46, 48–51, 53, 56–57, 60 (artist) (1950–1954)
- House of Mystery #207, 211, 217, 219, 224, 243, 258, 283, 317 (writer) (1972–1983)
- House of Secrets #101, 103–104, 120 (writer) (1972–1974)
- Leading Screen Comics #45–48, 50, 54–57, 60, 62–77 (writer/artist) (1950–1955)
- Leave It to Binky #1 (writer/artist) (1948)
- Limited Collectors' Edition #C–33, C–42, C–50 (Rudolph the Red-Nosed Reindeer) (writer/artist); #C–36 (The Bible) (writer) (1975–1977)
- Movietown's Animal Antics #28–33, 35, 37–41, 43–44, 47, 49–51 (artist) (1950–1954)
- New Comics #1–4 (writer/artist) (1935–1936)
- Nutsy Squirrel #61–62, 65, 67–72 (artist) (1954–1957)
- Peter Porkchops #30–38, 40–42, 44, 46–52, 61 (artist) (1954–1959)
- Phantom Stranger #31, 35–36 (Black Orchid backup stories) (writer) (1974–1975)
- Plop! #1 (writer) (1973)
- Raccoon Kids #52–62 (artist) (1954–1956)
- Scribbly #1–15 (writer/artist) (1948–1951)
- Secret Origins #29 (original Red Tornado) (writer/artist) (1988)
- Secrets of Haunted House #43 (artist); #44 (writer) (1981–1982)
- Secrets of Sinister House #6–7, 9 (writer) (1972–1973)
- Sensation Comics #84 (Wonder Woman) (writer) (1948)
- Sugar and Spike #1–98 (writer/artist) (1956–1971)
- The Three Mouseketeers #1–8 (writer/artist); 19, 24 (writer) (1956–1959)
- Time Warp #5 (writer) (1980)
- The Unexpected #217 (writer/artist); #219 (writer) (1981–1982)
- Weird Mystery Tales #5 (writer) (1973)
- Weird War Tales #10–11, 14, 18, 21, 42–44 (writer) (1973–1976)
