= DC Archive Editions =

DC Comic Book Series

DC Archive Editions is a line of hardcovers that was published from 1989–2014, reprinting early, often rare comic book series, titles, and stories. They include more than 160 Golden Age and Silver Age comic properties currently owned by DC Comics, regardless of whether DC Comics was the original publisher. The series first published Superman Archives Vol. 1 in 1989. Most of the restoration work to make the pages suitable for quality printing has been done by Rick Keene, who has restored more than 2,500 pages.

== History ==
Cover to The Action Heroes Archives Vol. 2 (2007), focusing on the Charlton Comics characters; cover art by Steve Ditko.

The DC Archive Editions (DCAE) series began with DC's Golden Age, which is actually the output of three inter-related companies in the late 1930s and the early '40s: Max Gaines' All-American Publications (Flash, Green Lantern, Hawkman, Wonder Woman; All Star Comics starring the Justice Society of America, et al.); and Malcolm Wheeler-Nicholson's National Allied Publications, which became Harry Donenfeld's Detective Comics (Batman, Superman, et al.). The series continued with Silver and Bronze Age series such as Legion of Super-Heroes, Challengers of the Unknown, Doom Patrol, Metal Men, Aquaman, and Justice League of America.

The series' format was designed by Alex Jay with Richard Bruning providing the art direction. Its various volumes also include series/titles not originally published by DC, though acquired in the intervening years, such as: Golden Age characters Plastic Man and Blackhawk, originally published by Quality Comics; the "Shazam" Marvel Family of characters Captain Marvel, Captain Marvel Jr., and Mary Marvel, originally published by Fawcett; and the Charlton Silver Age line of superheroes (Blue Beetle, Captain Atom, The Question, et al.) in the DCAE Action Heroes volumes.

The DC Archive Editions preserve DC's history and provide readers with stories that normally would not be available. When the series first started, the cover price was U.S. $39.95, but in the early 1990s the standard cover price became U.S. $49.99, although some books in the line containing more content have cost much more (with a higher page count and higher cover price). Since 2009, new volumes have been released with a cover price of U.S. $59.99.

In the early to mid-2000s, newer printings of previously published DC Archive Editions volumes were released at the special introductory cover price of U.S. $19.95. In 2001, excess stock of Batman Archives Vol. 1 (originally released back in 1990) first printing edition was sold for this reduced price, with a new price sticker placed on the book's shrink wrap. Sales proved successful, as the remaining inventory sold out. DC used this promotional price again with a second printing of Batman Archives Vol. 1 in 2003 (only pre-ordered copies of this second printing for the direct market were at this lower price, while the remaining stock for the bookstore market was at the regular U.S. 49.99 price), Superman Archives Vol. 1 (fifth printing) in 2004, and Batman: The Dark Knight Archives Vol. 1 (third printing) in 2005.

It was widely believed that the DC Archive Editions would cease publication in 2008, but, in an issue of the publication Comic Shop News (issue #1080, February 27, 2008), an update was provided: "In spite of earlier reports of their demise, DC Archives will continue in 2008 and 2009, although in reduced numbers, focusing on continuing already-established Archives' series". The numbers have since decreased from 14 volumes released in 2007 to seven released in 2008, five in 2009, four in 2010, and three in 2011, before rebounding in 2012 with 10 volumes. In 2013, the volume length was increased to 400 pages, but only three volumes were released. The most recent volume, Superman: The Man of Tomorrow Archives Vol. 3 was released in 2014. A Captain Comet Archive Vol. 1 and Batman: World's Finest Comics Vol. 3 were both solicited by DC for release in 2013, but both were cancelled prior to release and have yet to be rescheduled.

Post-2014, with no new DC Archive Editions released, DC has instead published the hardcover DC Omnibus line, with various titles/characters from the Golden Age, the Silver Age, and the Bronze Age eras, and each Age era Omnibus volume is also published as two or three (depending on page count) trade paperbacks, replacing the DC Archive Editions line.

Will Eisner's The Spirit Archives, T.H.U.N.D.E.R. Agents Archives, Mad Archives, and Elfquest Archives are not technically part of the formal DC Archive Editions series (DCAEs are typified by a cover format consisting of a black pinstriped background onto which a colored v-shaped area is overlaid from the top, reaching almost to the bottom for all books) as DC does not own those properties/characters, and is licensing them from the copyright holders. In the case of Mad, the property is owned by DC's parent company, but not DC itself. The licensing for the T.H.U.N.D.E.R. Agents works is held by IDW as of 2012. These non-DC Archive Editions series published by DC, however, are included in the list here, as the physical format (paper stock, size dimension, etc.) is similar enough that the average fan would consider them part of the overall DC Archive Editions series.

== Awards and recognition ==
The first volume of the Plastic Man Archives won the Comics Buyer's Guide Fan Award for Favorite Reprint Graphic Album in 2001.

== Alphabetical list of DC Archive Editions ==
Golden Age DC Archive Editions books (85)

- All Star Comics Vol. 0–11
- Batman (GA Detective Comics stories) Vol. 1–8
- Batman: Dark Knight (GA Batman stories) Vol. 1–8
- Batman: World's Finest Comics Vol. 1–2
- Black Canary Vol. 1
- Blackhawk Vol. 1
- Comic Cavalcade Vol. 1
- DC Comics Rarities Vol. 1
- Golden Age Doctor Fate Vol. 1
- Golden Age Flash Comics Vol. 1–2
- Golden Age Green Lantern Vol. 1–2
- Golden Age Hawkman Vol. 1
- Plastic Man Vol. 1–8
- Golden Age Sandman Vol. 1
- Golden Age Spectre Vol. 1
- Golden Age Starman Vol. 1–2
- JSA All-Stars Vol. 1
- Robin Vol. 1–2
- Seven Soldiers of Victory Vol. 1–3
- Shazam! Vol. 1–4
- Shazam! Family Vol. 1
- Superman Vol. 1–8
- Superman: Action Comics Vol. 1–5
- Superman: World's Finest Comics Vol. 1–2
- Wonder Woman Vol. 1–7

Silver and Bronze Age DC Archive Editions books (83)

- Action Heroes Vol. 1–2
- Adam Strange Vol. 1–3
- Aquaman Vol. 1
- Atom Vol. 1–2
- Batman: Dynamic Duo Vol. 1–2
- Brave and the Bold Team-Up Vol. 1
- Challengers of the Unknown Vol. 1–2
- Doom Patrol Vol. 1–5
- Enemy Ace Vol. 1–2
- Flash Vol. 1–6
- Green Lantern Vol. 1–7
- Hawkman Vol. 1–2
- Justice League of America Vol. 1–10
- Kamandi Vol. 1–2
- Legion of Super-Heroes Vol. 1–13
- Metal Men Vol. 1–2
- Sgt. Rock: Vol. 1–4
- Sugar and Spike Vol. 1
- Supergirl Vol. 1–2
- Superman: Man of Tomorrow Vol. 1–3
- Superman's Girl Friend, Lois Lane Vol. 1
- Silver Age Teen Titans Vol. 1–2
- New Teen Titans Vol. 1–4
- Wonder Woman: The Amazon Princess Archives Vol. 1
- World's Finest Comics Vol. 1-3 (Superman/Batman and Robin team-up stories)

Non-DC Archive Editions series (also published by DC) (41)

- Elfquest Archives Vol. 1–4
- Mad Archives Vol. 1–4
- Will Eisner's The Spirit Archives Vol. 1–26 (Vol. 27 is post-Eisner material published by Dark Horse Comics)
- T.H.U.N.D.E.R. Agents Archives Vol. 1–7

== See also ==
- List of comic books on CD/DVD
- Marvel Masterworks, a similar collection by Marvel Comics
