= Sugar and Spike =

American comic book series

- Cover to Sugar and Spike #1 (April/May 1956), art by Sheldon Mayer.

Publication information
- Publisher: DC Comics
- Schedule: Bimonthly
- Format: Standard
- Publication date: April/May 1956-October/November 1971
- No. of issues: 98
- Main character(s): Sugar Plumm; Cecil "Spike" Wilson

Creative team
- Created by: Sheldon Mayer
- Written by: Sheldon Mayer
- Artist: Sheldon Mayer
- Editor(s): Larry Nadle #1–52 (Note: Though Nadle edited the title, issues 1–21 were attributed in the indicia to Whitney Ellsworth.); Murray Boltinoff #53–93; Dick Giordano #94; E. Nelson Bridwell #95–98

Sugar and Spike is an American comic book series published by DC Comics from 1956 through 1971, named after its main protagonists. The series was created, written, and drawn by Sheldon Mayer.

== Publication history ==
The series was launched in 1956 along with another Sheldon Mayer creation The Three Mouseketeers, and it was supervised by Larry Nadle, who edited DC's humor line until his death in 1963. The Sugar & Spike series had 98 issues published in the United States through 1971, when due to Mayer's failing eyesight that limited his drawing ability, the series was canceled. Later, after cataract surgery restored his eyesight, Mayer returned to writing and drawing Sugar and Spike stories, continuing to do so until his death in 1991; these stories appeared in overseas markets and only a few have been reprinted in the United States. The American reprints appeared in the digest sized comics series The Best of DC #29, 41, 47, 58, 65, and 68. In 1992, Sugar and Spike #99 was published as part of the DC Silver Age Classics series; this featured two previously unpublished stories by Mayer. DC Comics writer and executive Paul Levitz has described Sugar and Spike as being "Mayer's most charming and enduring creation".

DC attempted to license Sugar and Spike as a syndicated newspaper strip but was unsuccessful. Sales on the "Sugar and Spike" issues of The Best of DC were strong enough that DC announced plans for a new ongoing series featuring the characters. The project was never launched for unknown reasons.

Mayer had an agreement with DC that no one else could write Sugar and Spike. Despite this, they have occasionally made cameo appearances in modern comic books. They are rescued by the underwater heroine Dolphin in Showcase #100. They appear as theme park characters in Justice League Spectacular; as being baby-sat by Cassie Sandsmark in Wonder Woman #113; and as teenagers on the crowded cover of Legionnaires #43. They have a cameo on a video screen in Planet Krypton in Kingdom Come #1. The two made speaking cameo appearances in the first two pages of The All-New Batman: The Brave and the Bold #4, but they were not named. In an issue of the digital-first series Adventures of Superman, the children are babysat by Superman in his secret identity as reporter Clark Kent.

== Featured characters ==
The comic featured the misadventures of two toddlers named Sugar Plumm and Cecil "Spike" Wilson, who possessed the ability to communicate via "baby talk" with each other and to other infants, but not to adults. It shared ideas concerning baby-talk with P. L. Travers' Mary Poppins novel; one notable feature was that all babies spoke the same baby-talk "language", allowing Sugar and Spike to speak with not only human infants, but baby animals as well. Another popular recurring feature was paper dolls of the two leads, with outfits based on designs submitted by readers. Mayer used his own children, Merrily and Lanney, as inspiration for the strip.

In addition to the toddlers, their parents and adults, who were only seen from the waist down (Bill and Barbara Plumm; Harvey and Peg Wilson), recurring characters included:

- Little Arthur, a "big boy" too old for baby-talk. A spoiled brat and a ruffian, Arthur torments Sugar and Spike, but is invariably outwitted by them in the end. He is introduced in issue #17 (August 1958).
- Sugar's Uncle Charley, a bachelor and police officer who is a stereotypical "fun uncle", often playing with the kids and giving them gifts when he comes to visit.
- Bernie the Brain, a child genius who, despite being the same age as Sugar and Spike, is an accomplished scientist and inventor who speaks and understands "grown-up talk". When he first encounters Sugar and Spike, he requires a translating device of his own invention to teach him their baby-talk having already progressed past that stage, intellectually. He enjoys the chance to be a normal kid with Sugar and Spike, while the pair loves playing with Bernie's various inventions. The two often seek out Bernie when they encounter something they do not understand, particularly something involving grown-up behavior.

== Revival ==
Writer Keith Giffen and artist Bilquis Evely brought back the characters as adults in 2016 as part of the anthology series Legends of Tomorrow. Publisher Dan DiDio stated: "They're not spoiled kids anymore, but they're older and they're operating as private investigators handling problems and mysteries that the superheroes can't handle themselves".

== In other media ==
- Sugar and Spike make a cameo appearance in the Batman: The Brave and the Bold episode "The Siege of Starro!".
- Sugar and Spike appear as character summons in Scribblenauts Unmasked: A DC Comics Adventure.
- Bernie the Brain made a cameo in Crisis on Infinite Earths #9 watching Clark Kent on the WGBS television news report on the Crisis and he appears to be very concerned about what is going on.

== Collected editions ==
- The Sugar and Spike Archives Vol. 1 collects Sugar & Spike #1–10, 272 pages, September 2011, ISBN 1-4012-3112-8
- The TOON Treasury of Classic Children's Comics includes "Once upon a time there was a cute little baby boy named (of all things) Cecil..." from Sugar & Spike #1; "Grown-Up Game" from Sugar & Spike #20; and "Pint-Size Love Story" from Sugar & Spike #21, 360 pages, September 2009, Harry N. Abrams, ISBN 0810957302
- The Greatest 1950s Stories Ever Told includes "Lobsters Away" from Sugar & Spike #3, 288 pages, October 1990, ISBN 0930289803
- Sugar & Spike: Metahuman Investigations collects Sugar & Spike stories from Legends of Tomorrow #1–6, 144 pages, November 2016, ISBN 978-1401264826
