= All-American Publications =

American comic book publishing company

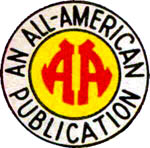
- Genre: Superhero, adventure, funny animal, humor
- Founded: 1939; 87 years ago
- Founder: Max Gaines
- Defunct: 1946; 80 years ago
- Fate: Merged and folded into National Comics Publications
- Successor: National Comics Publications
- Headquarters: 225 Lafayette Street; New York City, U.S.
- Key people: Harry Donenfeld; Jack Liebowitz
- Products: Comic books

All-American Publications, Inc. (Note: The name is spelled with a hyphen per its logo (pictured) and sources including All-American Publications at Don Markstein's Toonopedia. Archived from the original on April 15, 2012.) was one of two American comic book companies that merged to form the modern-day DC Comics, one of the two largest publishers of comic books in the United States. Superheroes created for All-American include the original Atom, Flash, Green Lantern, Hawkman, and Wonder Woman, all in the 1940s' Golden Age of Comic Books.

== Publishing history ==
Max Gaines, future founder of EC Comics, formed All-American Publications in 1939 after successfully seeking funding from Harry Donenfeld, CEO of both National Allied Publications (publisher of Action Comics and other titles) and sister company Detective Comics, Inc. (publisher of the namesake comic book). As Gerard Jones writes of Donenfeld's investment:

All-American Comics #16 (July 1940), cover art by Sheldon Moldoff.

Harry had agreed on one condition: that [Gaines] take [Detective Comics partner] Jack Liebowitz on as his partner. ... Jack would be tempted to leave and form a competing company if there was nothing to hold him. And it may well have been a way for Harry to keep Gaines under control; since Jack was still drawing a salary and significant bonuses from Detective Comics and [self-distributorship] Independent News, he wouldn't let Gaines take off on his own or act against the interests of the other companies. ... Gaines became the principal and Jack Liebowitz the minority owner of All-American [Publications].

While All-American, at 225 Lafayette Street in Manhattan, was physically separated from DC's office space uptown at 480 Lexington Avenue, it used the informal "DC" logo on most of its covers for distribution and marketing reasons. In 1944, Gaines sold his share of the company to Liebowitz by June 1945, keeping only Picture Stories from the Bible as the foundation of his own new company, EC. As Jones describes:

Gaines saw the end of the superhero fad coming and wanted to get into something more durable, like children's books and magazines. ... In 1944, he decided he'd had enough. He let Jack Liebowitz buy him out with a loan from Harry.... Liebowitz promptly orchestra the merger of All American Comics and Detective Comics into National Comics, of which he was the junior partner, vice president, and publisher. Next he took charge of organizing National Comics, Independent News, and their affiliated firms into a single corporate entity, National Periodical Publications".

At the end of 1944, but shortly before the merger, Gaines first rebranded All-American with its own logo, beginning with books cover-dated February 1945: All-Flash #17, Sensation Comics #38, Flash Comics #62, Green Lantern #14, Funny Stuff #3, and Mutt & Jeff (Note: The comic book, unlike the comic strip, spelled its title with an ampersand. See: Mutt & Jeff at the Grand Comics Database.) #16, and the following month's All-American Comics #64 and the hyphenless All Star Comics #24. Liebowitz later merged his and Donenfeld's companies into National Comics Publications by September 30, 1946.

== Creative legacy ==
All-American's first superheroes began their run in Flash Comics #1 (Jan. 1940), cover art by Sheldon Moldoff.

During All-American's existence, much cross-promotion took place between the two editorially independent companies, so much so that the first appearance of the Justice Society of America, in All Star Comics #3 (Winter 1940/41), included in its roster All-American characters the Atom, the Flash, Green Lantern and Hawkman, and the National characters Doctor Fate, Hour-Man (as it was then spelled), the Spectre, and the Sandman — creating comics' first intercompany crossover, (Note: National's top stars, Batman and Superman, had first crossed over as "honorary" Justice Society members in All Star Comics #7 (Dec. 1941), making cameo appearances in the three-page introduction and four-page conclusion of the story "$1,000,000 for War Orphans". See: All-Star Comics #7 at the Grand Comics Database.) with characters from different companies interacting — although National's Sandman, Spectre and Hour-Man had previously appeared in solo adventures in All Star Comics #1 (Summer 1940).

With Gaines as editor, assisted by Sheldon Mayer, All-American Publications launched its flagship series All-American Comics with an April 1939 premiere. Like many comics of the time, All-American debuted with a mix of newspaper comic strips, reprinted in color, and a smattering of original, comic-strip-like features. Among the strips were three hits of the era: Mutt and Jeff, by Al Smith ghosting for strip creator Bud Fisher; Skippy, by Percy Crosby; and Toonerville Folks by Fontaine Fox. New content included Scribbly, a semiautobiographical Mayer feature about a boy cartoonist. All-American Comics lasted 102 issues through October 1948.

Also debuting that month was Movie Comics ("A full movie show for 10 cents"), featuring simple adaptations of movies using painted movie stills, as well as cartoonist Ed Wheelan's popular Minute Movies comics. The first of its six issues through Aug. 1939 adapted no fewer than five films: Son of Frankenstein, Gunga Din, The Great Man Votes, Fisherman's Wharf, and Scouts to the Rescue.

The next two comics were Mutt & Jeff, which ran 103 issues from Summer 1939 - June 1958; and the company's superhero debut, Flash Comics #1 (Jan. 1940), which introduced the super-speedster title character, created by writer Gardner Fox and artist Harry Lampert, as well as the Golden Age Hawkman and future Hawkgirl, by Fox and artist Dennis Neville, and Johnny Thunder, by scripter John Wentworth and artist Stan Aschmeier, among other features.

The Golden Age Green Lantern, from Batman writer Bill Finger and artist Martin Nodell, debuted in All-American Comics #16 (July 1940), followed by the original Atom, created by Bill O'Connor and penciler Ben Flinton, in All-American #19 (Nov. 1940). Wonder Woman was introduced in a nine-page story in All Star Comics #8 (Dec./Jan. 1941/1942), the product of psychologist William Moulton Marston (under the pseudonym Charles Moulton) and Max Charles Gaines, and drawn by artist Harry G. Peter.

== Titles ==
- All-American Comics (began April 1939)
- All-Flash (began Summer 1941)
- All Star Comics (began Summer 1940; co-publication with Detective Comics, Inc.)
- Comic Cavalcade (began Winter 1942–1943)
- Flash Comics (began January 1940)
- Funny Stuff (began Summer 1944)
- Green Lantern (began Fall 1941)
- Movie Comics (1939)
- Mutt and Jeff (began September 1939)
- Picture Stories from the Bible - New Testament (1944–1945)
- Picture Stories from the Bible - Old Testament (1942 - Fall 1943)
- Sensation Comics (began January 1942)
- The Big All-American Comic Book (1944, one-shot)
- Wonder Woman (began Summer 1942)

== All-American characters ==
Premiere issue of All Star Comics (Summer 1940), the anthology that would introduce the Justice Society of America two issues later. Note the National / DC characters the Sandman, the Spectre and Hour-Man.

=== Superhero/masked crimefighter ===
- The Atom
- Doctor Mid-Nite
- The Flash
- The Gay Ghost
- Green Lantern
- Hawkman and Hawkgirl
- Hop Harrigan
- The King
- Little Boy Blue and the Blue Boys
- Mr. Terrific
- Sargon the Sorcerer
- Johnny Thunder
- Gary Concord, the Ultra-Man
- The Whip
- Wildcat
- Wonder Woman

=== Adventure/war ===
- The Black Pirate
- Cliff Cornwall
- Gunner Godbee
- Red, White and Blue (Red Dugan, Whitey Smith, Blooey Blue)

=== Funny-animal/other humor ===
- Bulldog Drumhead
- The Red Tornado
- Scribbly the Boy Cartoonist
