= Comic Cavalcade =

US comic book

- Green Lantern, Wonder Woman and the Flash do their bit for the war: Comic Cavalcade #6 (Spring 1944), cover art by Paul Reinman.

Publication information
- Publisher: DC Comics
- Schedule: Quarterly: #1–13; Bi-monthly: #14–63
- Format: Ongoing series
- Publication date: Winter 1942 – Jun/Jul 1954
- No. of issues: 63
- Main character(s): Flash; Green Lantern; Wonder Woman

Creative team
- Written by: Bill Finger; Gardner Fox; Sheldon Mayer; William Moulton Marston
- Artist(s): Sheldon Mayer; Irwin Hasen; H.G. Peter; Martin Nodell

Comic Cavalcade was an anthology comic book published by All-American Publications then DC Comics from 1942 to 1954.

Most American comic book publishers in the 1930s and 1940s Golden Age of comic books published anthology titles that showcased a variety of characters, usually with one star—such as Green Lantern in All-American Comics or Wonder Woman in Sensation Comics. Comic Cavalcade, however, featured both those star characters as well as the Flash, a star in his own namesake title as well as the spin-off All-Flash.

At 96 pages initially, Comic Cavalcade was about one-and-one-half-times the length of the average comic book of the time. It was priced at 15 cents, when the average comic cost a dime.

Many stories in Comic Cavalcade were scripted by other than the characters' regular writers, for deadline reasons. Batman writer Bill Finger, for example, would occasionally write Flash stories for Comic Cavalcade when regular Flash writer Gardner Fox was preoccupied with other projects.

One non-superhero ongoing character introduced in Comic Cavalcade was newspaperman Johnny Peril. His roots, prior to his first appearance, came in the one-off story "Just a Story" in issue #15 (July 1946), by writer-artist Howard Purcell. With issue #22 (Sept. 1947), the anthological "Just a Story" series gained Peril as, generally, a witness or narrator rather than as an integral part of the narrative. With this issue, the series title became "Johnny Peril Tells Just a Story", eventually changed to "Johnny Peril's Surprise Story" as Johnny became the series' two-fisted hero until the series ended with issue #29 (Nov. 1948). The character went on to appear in his own feature in All-Star Comics, Danger Trail and Sensation Comics through 1953. He returned in the Silver Age of Comic Books in 1968, in The Unexpected.

Initially published quarterly, the title went bi-monthly beginning with #14 (April–May 1946). It was revamped completely with #30 (December–January 1948), becoming a talking animal humor book when superheroes faded from popularity in the post-war era. Featured were animator Frank Tashlin's movie-cartoon duo The Fox and the Crow, along with cartoonist Woody Gelman's creations, The Dodo and the Frog and Nutsy Squirrel. The book's length by this time had been reduced to 76 pages.

The title would later be referenced with DC's 1970s Cancelled Comic Cavalcade series.
