= All-American Comics =

American anthology comic book series

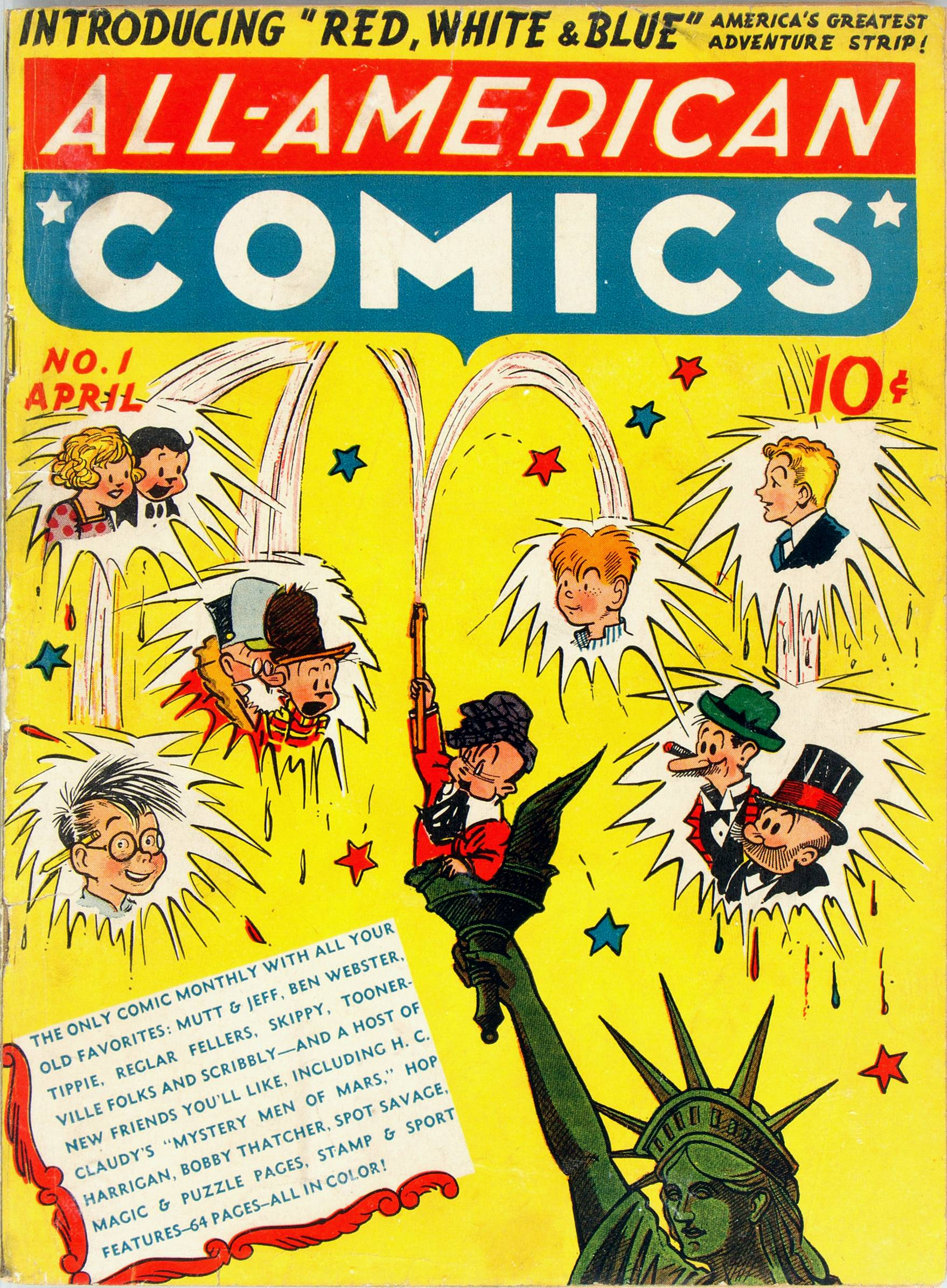
- Cover of All-American Comics #1 (April 1939), art by Sheldon Mayer.

Publication information
- Publisher: All-American Publications
- Schedule: Monthly: #1–49, #71–102; Eight times a year: #50–66; Bi-monthly: #67–70
- Format: Ongoing series
- Publication date: April 1939 – October 1948
- No. of issues: 102

Creative team
- Written by: Alfred Bester, Bill Finger, Sheldon Mayer, Bill O'Connor
- Artist(s): Ben Flinton, Sheldon Mayer, Martin Nodell, Paul Reinman
- Editor: List: All-American Comics: Max Gaines (#1–41) Sheldon Mayer (#42–80) Julius Schwartz (#81–102) All-American Western: Julius Schwartz (#103–126)

All-American Comics is a comics anthology and the flagship title of comic book publisher All-American Publications, one of the forerunners of DC Comics. It ran for 102 issues from 1939 to 1948. Characters created for the title, including Green Lantern, the Atom, the Red Tornado, Doctor Mid-Nite, and Sargon the Sorcerer, later became mainstays of the DC Comics line.

== Publication history ==
All-American Comics published 102 issues from April 1939 to October 1948. The series was an anthology which included a mixture of new material and reprints of newspaper strips. Sheldon Mayer's Scribbly was introduced in the first issue as was Hop Harrigan.

The Golden Age Green Lantern was introduced by artist/creator Martin Nodell in issue #16 (July 1940). He continued in the title until #102 (Oct 1948).

The Golden Age Atom debuted in #19 (October 1940) and Mayer created the original Red Tornado in #20 (November 1940).

Doctor Mid-Nite first appeared in #25 (April 1941), while Howard Purcell and John Wentworth introduced Sargon the Sorcerer in the following month's issue.

Alfred Bester and Paul Reinman created the monstrous supervillain Solomon Grundy in #61 (October 1944).

Other features included "Toonerville Folks", "Mutt and Jeff", and "Ripley's Believe It or Not!".

All-American Publications and all its titles were purchased by National Periodicals (DC Comics) in 1946. Responding to the demand for Western comics, All-American Comics changed title and format with #103 (November 1948) to All-American Western. The retitled series had Johnny Thunder as the lead feature. It changed title and format again to All-American Men of War as of #127 (August–September 1952).

A May 1999 one-shot issue by writer Ron Marz and artist Eduardo Barreto was a part of the "Justice Society Returns" storyline.

== Features ==
- Scribbly the Boy Cartoonist: issues #1-59
- Green Lantern: issues #16-102
- The Atom: #20-46, 48-61, 70-72
- Dr. Mid-Nite: #25-102
- Sargon the Sorcerer: #26-50, 60
