= The Three Mouseketeers =

Comic series published by DC Comics

The Golden Age Three Mouseketeers, from the cover of Funny Stuff #1 (Summer 1944). Art by Sheldon Mayer.

The Three Mouseketeers is the name of two separate talking animal comic series published by DC Comics.

== History ==
=== Golden Age version ===
The original Three Mouseketeers were published in DC's humor series Funny Stuff, first appearing in Funny Stuff #1 (Summer 1944). The strip was drawn by Ronald Santi.

The series was a loose parody of the classic 1844 Alexandre Dumas novel The Three Musketeers. In this case, the lead swordsmice were named Aramouse, Amouse, and Porterhouse (with young accomplice D'Artagmouse), and had various adventures while serving King Looey XIV. Their arch-enemy is Duke Bazook.

The series ran in Funny Stuff until early 1948, after which the characters remained unseen for years. The Mouseketeers were revisited in a 1982 Captain Carrot and His Amazing Zoo Crew time-travel storyline in which it is revealed the Mouseketeers are historical figures in Earth-C's version of France during the 17th century.

=== Silver Age version ===
The Silver Age Three Mouseketeers, from The Three Mouseketeers #1 (March–April 1956). Art by Sheldon Mayer.

The second Three Mouseketeers series appeared in a comic title of the same name, which ran from 1956 to 1960 for 26 issues. They were created by Sheldon Mayer, though most of the work was done by Rube Grossman after the first few issues, and DC humor staff Larry Nadle edited the title. (Note: Though Nadle edited the title, issues 1-21 was credited to Whitney Ellsworth in the indicia, who was also credited to Ellsworth in the statement of ownership of issue 22.)

Though the title was clearly inspired by Alexandre Dumas' novel The Three Musketeers, nothing else about the characters was, with no similarities to the earlier Golden Age series. The stories revolved around three mice, all members of a club. There was the pompous, self-styled leader, Fatsy, who was obese and wore a sailor's uniform similar to Donald Duck's, then Patsy, tall and dim-witted (also the only Mouseketeer to go without clothing), and last of all Minus, short, dressed in oversized t-shirt and baseball cap with the bill pointing to one side. Of the group, Minus was the most likely to get into trouble (a running gag had him getting many demerits from Fatsy) though this was usually not of a malicious nature. The mice met at a clubhouse, which was an old tin can with the open mouth covered by a leaf. The mice rarely used this entrance, preferring an underground secret entrance. Their adventures involved dealing with humans (whom they referred to as the Bigfoots), neighborhood cats, and a particularly nasty hawk named Hamilton.

The series ended its initial run when DC decided to concentrate on its line of superhero comics. The series did get a revival when it was reprinted for seven issues from 1970 to 1971; later, in the 1980s, Mouseketeers stories were reprinted in digest format along with other classic DC talking-animal characters under the Funny Stuff banner.

== See also ==
- Captain Carrot and His Amazing Zoo Crew!
- Funny Stuff
