= Atom (character) =

Name shared by several comic book superheroes from the DC Comics universe

Publication information
- Publisher: DC Comics
- First appearance: Pratt: All-American Comics #19; (October 1940); Palmer: Showcase #34 (Oct. 1961); Cray: Suicide Squad #44 (August 1990); Atom One Million: DC One Million 80-Page Giant #1,000,000 (August 1999); Choi: DCU: Brave New World (2006)
- Created by: Pratt: Bill O'Connor (writer); Ben Flinton (artist); Palmer: Julius Schwartz (editor and co-plotter); Gardner Fox (writer); Gil Kane (artist); Cray: John Ostrander; Choi: Gail Simone; Grant Morrison; Atom One Million: Grant Morrison

In-story information
- Alter ego: Al Pratt; Ray Palmer; Adam Cray; Ryan Choi
- Team affiliations: Pratt: Justice Society of America; All-Star Squadron; Black Lantern Corps; Palmer: Justice League; Teen Titans; Indigo Tribe; S.H.A.D.E.; Cray: Suicide Squad; Black Lantern Corps; Choi: Teen Titans; Justice League; Atom One Million: Justice Legion Alpha
- Abilities: (All): Genius-level intellect; Combat experience; (Palmer, Cray, & Choi): Size and mass alteration via belt; (Pratt): Superhuman strength, stamina, durability, and speed; Atomic punch; Radiation immunity; Extended lifespan

The Atom is a name shared by five superheroes appearing in American comic books published by DC Comics.

The original Golden Age Atom, Al Pratt, was created by writer Bill O'Connor and artist Ben Flinton and first appeared in All-American Publications' All-American Comics #19 (October 1940). The second Atom was the Silver Age Atom, Ray Palmer, who first appeared in 1961. The third Atom, Adam Cray, was a minor character present in Suicide Squad stories. The fourth Atom, Ryan Choi, debuted in a new Atom series in August 2006. Another Atom from the 853rd Century first appeared as part of Justice Legion Alpha in August 1999.

The Atom has been the star of multiple solo series, and four of the five have appeared as members of various superhero teams, such as the Justice Society of America, the Justice League, the Suicide Squad, and the Justice Legion Alpha.

== Fictional character biographies ==
=== Al Pratt ===
The original Atom, Al Pratt, first appeared in All-American Comics #19 (October 1940). He initially had no superpowers; instead, he was a diminutive college student and later a physicist who was depicted as a tough guy, a symbol of all the short kids who could still make a difference. Pratt was a founding member of the Justice Society of America, later gaining limited super-strength and an energy-charged 'atomic punch'. Pratt is also the father of Damage and godfather of Atom Smasher.

Initially a proverbial 98-pound weakling, bullied at school and unable to impress the girl of his dreams, Mary James, Pratt was trained to fighting condition by ex-boxer Joe Morgan. Pratt soon became a founding member of the Justice Society of America, appearing in the team's various stories during their original Golden Age appearances. He later became a founding and active member of the All-Star Squadron. During World War II, Pratt served as a tank driver for the United States Army.

In 1948, the Atom gained super strength as a result of the latent effects of his 1942 battle with the reluctant supervillain Cyclotron (after whose costume Pratt redesigned his own). It was later revealed that he had taken partial custodianship of Cyclotron's daughter, Terri.

Pratt died in the charge against Extant during the events of Zero Hour. In 1994, it was revealed that Pratt had a son named Grant Emerson. Pratt was unaware of this - he had been told that there were complications with childbirth and that the child had not survived, but Pratt's wife was suffocated by the villain Vandal Savage, who kidnapped Grant and genetically altered him into a superhuman. Grant later became the superhero Damage.

In the afterlife, Pratt befriends the recently deceased Starman, David Knight. In dreams, David brings his brother, Jack Knight, to a banquet in limbo attended by Atom and several other deceased heroes.

In the Blackest Night crossover, Pratt was reanimated as a member of the Black Lantern Corps, to attack the Justice Society and his sons Damage and Atom Smasher.

=== Ray Palmer ===
The Atom introduced during the Silver Age of Comic Books in Showcase #34 (1961) is physicist and university professor Raymond Palmer, Ph.D. After finding a mass of white dwarf star matter that had fallen to Earth, Palmer fashioned a lens which allowed him to shrink down to subatomic size. Originally, his size and molecular density abilities derived from the white dwarf star material of his costume, controlled by mechanisms in his belt, and later by controls in the palms of his gloves. Much later, he gained the innate equivalent powers within his own body. After the events of Identity Crisis, Palmer shrank himself to microscopic size and disappeared. The search for Palmer was a major part of the series Countdown to Final Crisis.

=== Paul Hoben ===
Prior to Ray Palmer's trip to the Amazon Jungle, he learned that his wife Jean Loring has had an affair with her colleague, Paul Hoben. Palmer and Loring got a divorce. Later, Palmer offers his blessing to the couple when they marry, and he offers Hoben his size-changing belt so that Hoben can protect Ivy Town after Palmer returns to the Morlaidhans. Adam Cray would later steal this belt; Hoben never uses the costume or name of the Atom.

=== Adam Cray ===
Adam Cray, Suicide Squad #46.

Adam Cray, son of the murdered Senator Joseph Cray, first appeared as the Atom in the pages of Suicide Squad #44 by John Ostrander (August 1990). Cray is initially believed to be Ray Palmer in disguise by members of the team. Cray was recruited by Palmer (who faked his own death) to apprehend the Micro Squad, a group of villains who had been reduced in size. Palmer intended to use Cray to uncover a shadowy government cabal which was using Palmer to discover the secret identities of other costumed heroes (Palmer's own identity no longer being secret). While Palmer infiltrated the Micro Squad, Cray would attract the attention of the Cabal as the new Atom so that no one would notice Palmer assuming the identity of a fallen Micro Squad member.

Adam Cray remains with the Suicide Squad briefly, serving as a secret weapon whose existence is unknown to others of the Squad. Cray is later killed by Blacksnake, a Micro Squad member who believes him to be Palmer.

During the events of Blackest Night, Cray is reanimated as a member of the Black Lantern Corps alongside several other fallen Suicide Squad members. Cray is destroyed by the Manhunter's self-destruct mechanism, unleashing an explosion of Green Lantern energy that eradicates the Black Lanterns.

In DC Rebirth, Adam Cray is the son of Senator Cray and Ryan Choi's roommate at Ivy University. Senator Cray also attended Ivy and expected Adam to attend Ivy as well.

=== Ryan Choi ===
Ryan Choi, as described by DC solicitations, is "a young hotshot professor who's filling the extra spot on Ivy University's teaching staff. .. and who inadvertently ends up filling the old Atom's super-heroic shoes". This new Atom is based on a redesign by Grant Morrison. He debuted in the Brave New World one-shot, a preview of projects, and then appeared in the series The All-New Atom, written by Gail Simone. He is later murdered by Deathstroke and his Titans. In the storyline Convergence, Choi was revealed to have survived in microscopic form.

=== Rhonda Piñeda ===
The New 52 introduced a new, female Atom, Rhonda Piñeda, a Hispanic American college student from Ivy Town. She is revealed to be working as a reluctant spy for Amanda Waller and Steve Trevor, gathering intel on the new Justice League recruits. At the conclusion of the "Trinity War" storyline, she is revealed to in fact be betraying both teams; she hails from the alternate universe of Earth-3, where she is a member of the Crime Syndicate operating under the name Atomica, an acquaintance of Johnny Quick.

=== Atom One Million ===
An unnamed scientist from another universe in the 853rd century performed experiments in superstring theory that creates a singularity and whose radiation alters his physical make-up. When the singularity threatened to expand and destroy his universe, he enters it in an attempt to save the universe but instead finds himself on an interdimensional bridge to the DC Universe as his own is wiped out. This Atom's powers differ from his predecessors in that he does not shrink himself, but breaks up into several smaller duplicates of himself divided amongst his mass. At atomic size, these duplicates can mimic elements such as gold and oxygen.

== Enemies ==
=== Golden Age enemies ===
- Black Dragon Society - A Japanese saboteur organization.
- Blackie -
- Cootie Gang - A gang who stole a solvant that can dissolve metal from a science lab.
- Dude Henwick - A gangster who led his gang in robbing an ice cream parlor.
- Emperor of America -
- Lefty Lou Albano -
- Perry Poodle - A baseball player who invents a machine that would enable him to cheat at baseball even when two criminals take advantage of him. Atom exposed to Perry what the two criminals were doing behind his back and defeated them. Some of the money Perry made was split between the donation to the Policeman's Ball and to Perry and his impoverished mother.
- Rattlesnake Pete -
- Raymond Macum - A science fraud.
- Scrime -
- Stroehm - A gangster who framed Mr. Baker for arson in order to get to the copper deposit on his property.
- Tusk - John Brandt is a criminal with tusks on his lower jaw.

=== Modern enemies ===
- Bug-Eyed Bandit - A scientist who controls robotic insects.
- Calculator - A criminal genius.
- Chronos - A time-traveling villain.
- Dean Mayland - The dean at Ivy University who dislikes Atom.
- Deraegis - A Katarthan chancellor.
- Doctor Light - A light-themed villain who is usually an enemy of the Teen Titans.
- Dwarfstar - A size-shifting supervillain.
- Floronic Man - A plant-controlling botanist.
- Giganta - A size-shifting supervillain who is usually an enemy of Wonder Woman.
- Lady Chronos - A Chinese woman who came across Chronos' research.
- Strobe - A criminal who stole an experimental suit that grants him energy projection and photokinesis.
- Thinker - A telepathic supervillain. He once fought both Atoms during one of his illegal activities.
- Waiting - A microscopic race who have their cities on the back of dogs.
- Weapons Master - A supervillain from the year 11,960 who is an expert at mechanical engineering.

==== Foes of lesser renown ====
- Bat-Knights - A group of six-inch high warriors from the tribe of Elvana who ride on bats. They were manipulated by a crook named Eddie Gordon until he was defeated by Atom.
- Big Gang - A gang who uses big gimmicks and target big items in their heists.
  - Big Head - The mastermind and leader of the Big Gang.
  - Big Ben - The Big Gang's timing specialist.
  - Big Bertha - The Big Gang's strongest member.
  - Big Cheese - A member of the Big Gang who uses specially-made cheeses with different properties.
  - Big Deal - A magician and card trick specialist who is the latest member of the Big Gang.
  - Big Shot - The Big Gang's marksman.
  - Big Wig - The Big Gang's master of disguise who utilizes different wigs.
- Billy Knolles - A toymaker who poses as a handyman to map out rich people's houses for his heists.
- Black Phantom - A costumed criminal who leaves a thumbprint as his calling card.
- Blacksnake - A CIA agent.
- Cannoneer - A human cannonball who turned to a life of crime and fought Atom and Batman.
- Carl Ballard - A criminal who took advantage of the alien Kulan Dar.
- Druid - The ruler of the sub-atomic world of Catamoore which is governed by magic.
- Eddie Gordon - A criminal who manipulated the Bat-Knights into doing his bidding until he was defeated by Atom.
- Elkins - A man whose camera hypnotizes people into doing his bidding.
- Gestalt - A group of elite scientific thinkers.
- Humbug - An artificial being created by the thoughts of the members of Gestalt.
- M'nagalah - A shapeless alien form who was an old enemy of Swamp Thing.
- Man in the Ion Mask - William Jameson is a man who uses an ionic ray in which anyone in the vicinity of him would be temporarily paralyzed so that he can rob them.
- Oscar D. Dollar - A gentleman who blames himself for his Silver Dollar causing trouble. Atom discovered that the Silver Dollar in question was made from a chunk of White Dwarf Star Matter.
- Panther - A black panther-themed villain and leader of the Panther Gang.
- Smarts - A collector and master planner.
- Sting - An old friend of Blacksnake who controls robotic bees.
- Swan Maiden - Dorothy Briggs is a swan-themed villain who used special effects and a slight disguise to pull off a trick where an actual swan robbed a bank. Her ruse was exposed by Atom who secretly recorded her confession.
- Toyboy - A criminal who uses his psychic power to animate toys and also possesses super-strength. Atom and Hawkman discovered that this was the evil side of Johnny Burns that manifested due to an exposure to the Photonoscope and a device that Ray Palmer was analyzing which affected his mother who worked as Ivy University's cleaning lady. When both Burns' were in the same area, the nice Burns disappeared and overcame the bad side in one body. After surrendering and being handed over to the police, Johnny was released into his mother's custody.
- Wizardo - Howard Crane is a magician, theater owner, and former quick change artist who performed a trick that enabled him to pose as astronaut Peter Venner and frame him for the crimes that he committed.

== Other versions ==
=== The Dark Knight Strikes Again ===
Frank Miller portrayed Ray Palmer as a major player in Batman: The Dark Knight Strikes Again as part of Batman's resistance. He was taken prisoner by Lex Luthor and made to live in one of his own petri dishes for a period of months until his rescue by Catgirl. in Dark Knight III, He was then instrumental in the liberation of Kandor until killed by their leader, Baal.

=== Tangent Comics ===
In the Tangent Comics imprint, the Atom is "Arthur Harrison Thompson", a subject of radiation testing on human beings. The first hero in the Tangent timeline, he inadvertently caused the Cuban Missile Crisis to escalate into a limited nuclear exchange that obliterated Florida and Cuba.

=== Elseworlds ===
- Some other re-imaginings of the Atom include an appearance in League of Justice, a story portraying the Justice League in a The Lord of the Rings-type story where the Atom was recast as a wizard/fortune teller called "Atomus The Palmer".
- Al Pratt as the Atom was one of the three heroes who chose to work at the side of Senator Thompson in The Golden Age. When Al discovers that Thompson is really the Ultra-Humanite, he joins the other heroes against the villain and Dyna-Man.
- The Al Pratt Atom appeared in JSA: The Unholy Three as a post-WW2 intelligence agent with transparent atomic flesh and a visible skeleton.
- JLA: Age of Wonder where Ray Palmer worked with a science consortium whose numbers at one point included Thomas Edison and Nikola Tesla.
- JLA: Created Equal, after Ray Palmer is killed in the cosmic storm that nearly wipes out the rest of the male population on Earth, a graduate student named Jill Athron is given a research grant to study Palmer's white-dwarf-star-belt. She becomes the Atom and joins the Justice League.
- The Robin in the Just Imagine... is granted transformation into the Atom evolved from an Incan rune of Hawkman.

=== 52 Multiverse ===
An alternate universe version of Al Pratt / Atom appears in 52 #52. This version is from a universe similar to Earth-Two.

In Countdown #30, the Challengers from Beyond encountered Earth-15, a world where the sidekicks had taken their mentor's places. On this Earth, the Atom is Jessica Palmer, a genius who graduated from MIT at age eight. The Search for Ray Palmer - Red Son features the Ray Palmer of Earth-30, an American captured by the Superman of a communist Russia. Countdown: Arena also depicts the Ray Palmer of Earth-6, who gained the powers and title of the Ray. The Search For Ray Palmer: Superwoman/Batwoman briefly features a female version of the Atom. On the newly introduced Earth-52, Atomarsupial is one of the simian Primate Legion

== Collected editions ==
=== Ray Palmer ===
Title	Material collected	Pages	ISBN
The Atom Archives, Vol. 1	Showcase #34-36, The Atom #1-5	208	1-56389-717-2
The Atom Archives, Vol. 2	The Atom #6-13	208	1-4012-0014-1
Sword of the Atom	Sword of the Atom #1-4 and Sword of the Atom Special #1-3	232	1-4012-1553-X
DC Comics Presents: The Atom	Legends of the DC Universe #28-29 and 40-41	96	

=== Ryan Choi ===
Title	Material collected	Pages	ISBN
My Life in Miniature	The All-New Atom #1-6, Brave New World #1	160	1-4012-1325-1
Future/Past	The All-New Atom #7-11	128	1-4012-1568-8
The Hunt for Ray Palmer	The All-New Atom #12-16	128	978-1-4012-1782-2
Small Wonder	The All-New Atom #17-18 and 20-25	192	978-1-4012-1996-3

== In other media ==
=== Television ===
==== Live-action ====
- The Ray Palmer incarnation of the Atom appears in the Legends of the Superheroes special "The Roast", portrayed by Alfie Wise.
- The Ray Palmer incarnation of the Atom appears in Justice League of America, portrayed by John Kassir.
- The Al Pratt incarnation of the Atom appears in the Smallville two-part episode "Absolute Justice", portrayed by Glenn Hoffman.
- The Ray Palmer incarnation of the Atom and Ryan Choi appear in media set in the Arrowverse, portrayed by Brandon Routh and Osric Chau respectively.

==== Animation ====
Ryan Choi as seen in Batman: The Brave and the Bold.

- The Ray Palmer incarnation of the Atom appears in The Superman/Aquaman Hour of Adventure, voiced by Pat Harrington, Jr.
- The Ray Palmer incarnation of the Atom appears in The All-New Super Friends Hour, voiced by Wally Burr.
- The Ray Palmer incarnation of the Atom appears in Super Friends, voiced again by Wally Burr.
- A futuristic incarnation of the Atom named Micron appears in the Batman Beyond two-part episode "The Call", voiced by Wayne Brady.
- A character partially based on Al Pratt / Atom named Tom Turbine appears in the Justice League episode "Legends", voiced by Ted McGinley. He is a member of the Justice Guild of America, a superhero team from another universe who exist as comic characters in the "prime" universe, and died in a nuclear war years prior.
- The Ray Palmer incarnation of the Atom appears in Justice League Unlimited, voiced by John C. McGinley.
- The Ryan Choi and Ray Palmer incarnations of the Atom appear in Batman: The Brave and the Bold, voiced by James Sie and Peter Scolari respectively.
- The Ray Palmer incarnation of the Atom appears in Young Justice, voiced by Jason Marsden.
- The Ray Palmer incarnation of the Atom appears in the DC Nation Shorts segment "Sword of the Atom!", voiced again by Jason Marsden.
- The Ray Palmer incarnation of the Atom appears in Justice League Action, voiced by Jerry O'Connell.
- The Ray Palmer incarnation of the Atom appears in the Teen Titans Go! episode "Strength of a Grown Man", voiced by Patton Oswalt.
- The Ray Palmer incarnation of the Atom appears in the Batwheels episode "Bite-Sized Buff", voiced by Dee Bradley Baker.

=== Film ===
- Ray Palmer appears in Justice League: The New Frontier, voiced by an uncredited Corey Burton.
- Alternate universe versions of Ray Palmer and Ryan Choi appear in Justice League: Gods and Monsters, voiced by Dee Bradley Baker and Eric Bauza respectively.
- An unidentified, alternate universe version of the Atom makes a non-speaking appearance in Justice League: The Flashpoint Paradox as a prisoner of Aquaman.
- Ryan Choi appears in the DC Extended Universe (DCEU) film Zack Snyder's Justice League, portrayed by Zheng Kai.
- The Ray Palmer incarnation of the Atom appears in Teen Titans Go! To the Movies, voiced again by Patton Oswalt.
- The Ryan Choi incarnation of the Atom appears in Lego DC Comics Super Heroes: The Flash, voiced again by Eric Bauza.
- The Ryan Choi incarnation of the Atom appears in Injustice, voiced by an uncredited Yuri Lowenthal.
- Al Pratt appears in the DCEU film Black Adam, portrayed by Henry Winkler.
- The Ray Palmer incarnation of the Atom appears in Justice League: Crisis on Infinite Earths.

=== Video games ===
- An unidentified Atom appears in DC Universe Online.
- The Ray Palmer incarnation of the Atom appears in Injustice: Gods Among Us.
- The Al Pratt, Ray Palmer, and Ryan Choi incarnations of the Atom all appear in Scribblenauts Unmasked: A DC Comics Adventure.
- The Ray Palmer incarnation of the Atom appears as a playable character in Lego Batman 3: Beyond Gotham, voiced by Troy Baker.
- Atomica, Ryan Choi / Atom, and the Arrowverse incarnation of Ray Palmer / Atom all appear in Lego DC Super-Villains, voiced by Laura Bailey, again by Jason Marsden, and Brandon Routh respectively.
- The Ryan Choi incarnation of the Atom appears as a playable DLC character in Injustice 2, voiced by Matthew Yang King.

== See also ==
- Ant-Man
- Molecule
