= All Star Comics =

Comic book series

- All Star Comics #3 (Winter 1940–1941), cover art by Everett E. Hibbard.

Publication information
- Publisher: DC Comics
- Schedule: Quarterly #1–4, 18–27; Bimonthly #5–17, 28–57
- Format: Ongoing series
- Publication date: (Original run); Summer 1940 – February–March 1951 (Revival); January–February 1976 – September–October 1978
- No. of issues: (Original run); 57 (Revival); 17
- Main character: Justice Society of America

Creative team
- Written by: List: Gardner Fox, John Broome, Robert Kanigher
- Artist: List: Bernard Baily, Jack Burnley, Lee Elias, Frank Giacoia, Joe Giella, Irwin Hasen, Everett E. Hibbard, Carmine Infantino, Jack Kirby, Joe Kubert, Harry Lampert, Sheldon Moldoff, Win Mortimer, Martin Nodell, Bob Oksner, H. G. Peter, Paul Reinman, Bernard Sachs, Joe Simon, Alex Toth, Keith Giffen, Wallace Wood, Joe Staton

All Star Comics is an American comic book series from All-American Publications, one of three companies that merged with National Periodical Publications to form the modern-day DC Comics. While the series' cover-logo trademark reads All Star Comics, its copyrighted title as indicated by postal indicia is All-Star Comics, with a hyphen. With the exception of the first two issues, All Star Comics told stories about the adventures of the Justice Society of America, the first team of superheroes. It also introduced Wonder Woman.

== Publication history ==
=== Original series ===
All Star Comics #1 (Summer 1940). Cover art is a collage of previously published panels by various artists.

The original concept for All Star Comics was an anthology title containing the most popular series from the other anthology titles published by both All-American Publications and National Comics.

All Star Comics #1 (cover-dated Summer 1940) contained superhero stories that included All-American's Golden Age Flash, Hawkman, Ultra-Man, as well as National's Hour-Man, Spectre, and Sandman. The adventure strip "Biff Bronson" and the comedy-adventure "Red, White, and Blue" also premiered with the Summer 1940 cover date.

Issue #3 (Winter 1940–1941) depicted the first meeting of the Justice Society of America, with its members swapping stories of their exploits which were subsequently illustrated in the comic's array of solo adventures. In addition to the Flash, Hawkman, Hour-Man, the Spectre, and the Sandman were Doctor Fate from National's More Fun Comics and the Green Lantern and the Atom from All-American's flagship title All-American Comics. The Justice Society of America (JSA) was originally a frame story used to present an anthology of solo stories about the individual characters, with each story handled by a different artist. Comic historian Les Daniels noted that "this was obviously a great notion, since it offered readers a lot of headliners for a dime, and also the fun of watching fan favorites interact". The anthology format was dropped in 1947 and replaced with full issue stories featuring the heroes teaming up to fight crime..

All Star Comics #8 (cover dated January 1942) featured the first appearance of Wonder Woman in an eight-page story written by William Moulton Marston, under the pen name of "Charles Moulton" with art by H. G. Peter. The insert story was included to test reader interest in the Wonder Woman concept. It generated enough positive fan response that Wonder Woman would be awarded the lead feature in the Sensation Comics anthology title starting from issue #1. That same issue saw the induction of Doctor Mid-Nite and Starman as members of the Justice Society as well. Starting with issue #11, Wonder Woman would appear in All Star Comics as a member of the Justice Society as their secretary.

With issue #34 (April–May 1947), Gardner Fox left the series and a new super-villain, the Wizard, was introduced. The Injustice Society first battled the JSA in issue #37 in a tale written by Robert Kanigher. The Black Canary guest starred in issue #38 and joined the team three issues later in #41.

All Star Comics increased its frequency from a quarterly to a bimonthly publication schedule, and the JSA lasted through March 1951 with issue #57 in a story titled "The Mystery of the Vanishing Detectives".

Superhero comics slumped in the early 1950s, and All Star Comics was renamed All-Star Western in 1951 with issue #58. In this issue, the "Justice Society of America" feature was replaced by Western heroes.

Artwork from an unpublished All Star Comics story titled "The Will of William Wilson" had survived and was printed in various publications from TwoMorrows Publishing.

All Star Comics #58 (January–February 1976), art by Mike Grell.

=== 1976 revival series ===
In 1976, the name All Star Comics was resurrected for a series portraying the modern-day adventures of the JSA. The new series dismissed the numbering from All-Star Western and continued the original numbering, premiering with All-Star Comics #58. Starting with issue #66, a hyphen was added to the title and the words "All-Star Comics" became a much smaller part of the cover; while the words "Justice Society" became much larger. The 1970s series introduced the new characters Power Girl and the Helena Wayne version of the Huntress. This series ran for seventeen issues before it was abruptly canceled with issue #74 as part of the DC Implosion and the JSA's adventures were folded into Adventure Comics.

After 23-year-old Gerry Conway became an editor at DC Comics, long-time JSA-fan Roy Thomas suggested to Conway that the JSA be given their own title again. Conway offered Thomas a chance to ghostwrite an issue of the revived All-Star Comics, but he declined as Thomas was under an exclusive contract with Marvel Comics at the time. However, in 1981 Thomas moved to DC and was able to work with the characters.

=== Subsequent revival ===
A two-issue All-Star Comics series was published as a part of the "Justice Society Returns" storyline in May 1999.

== Collected editions ==
- All Star Comics Archives:
  - Volume 0 collects #1–2, 144 pages, March 2006, ISBN 1-4012-0791-X
  - Volume 1 collects #3–6, 272 pages, 1992, ISBN 1-56389-019-4
  - Volume 2 collects #7–10, 256 pages, 1993, ISBN 0-930289-12-9
  - Volume 3 collects #11–14, 240 pages, November 1997, ISBN 1-56389-370-3
  - Volume 4 collects #15–18, 224 pages, December 1998, ISBN 1-56389-433-5
  - Volume 5 collects #19–23, 224 pages, December 1999, ISBN 1-56389-497-1
  - Volume 6 collects #24–28, 240 pages, October 2000, ISBN 1-56389-636-2
  - Volume 7 collects #29–33, 216 pages, July 2001, ISBN 1-56389-720-2
  - Volume 8 collects #34–38, 208 pages, August 2002, ISBN 1-56389-812-8
  - Volume 9 collects #39–43, 192 pages, August 2003, ISBN 1-4012-0001-X
  - Volume 10 collects #44–49, 216 pages, August 2004, ISBN 1-4012-0159-8
  - Volume 11 collects #50–57, 276 pages, March 2005, ISBN 1-4012-0403-1
- Justice Society
  - Volume 1 collects #58–67 and DC Special #29, 224 pages, August 2006, ISBN 1-4012-0970-X
  - Volume 2 collects #68–74 and Adventure Comics #461–466, 224 pages, February 2007, ISBN 1-4012-1194-1
- Showcase Presents: All-Star Comics collects issues #58–74 and Adventure Comics #461–466, 448 pages, September 2011, ISBN 1-4012-3303-1
- DC Finest: Justice Society of America
  - For America and Democracy collects #3-12, 632 pages, December 2024 ISBN 978-1779528476
  - The Plunder of the Psycho–Pirate collects #13-24, 600 pages, July 2025 ISBN 978-1799502074

=== Millennium Edition ===
In 2000 and 2001, DC Comics reprinted several of its most notable issues in the Millennium Edition series. All Star Comics #3 and #8 were reprinted in this format.
