= Turtle (comics) =

The Turtle

Publication information
- Publisher: DC Comics
- First appearance: All Flash #21 (Winter 1945)
- Created by: Gardner Fox; Martin Naydel

In-story information
- Alter ego: Unknown; Jai West
- Team affiliations: (Unknown); Secret Society of Super Villains; Legion of Doom; Legion of Zoom

The Turtle is the name of two supervillains appearing in comic books published by DC Comics, who were primarily enemies of the Flash.

Two original incarnations of the Turtle appeared in The Flash, portrayed by Aaron Douglas and Vanessa Walsh.

== Publication history ==
The first Turtle debuted in All-Flash #21 (December 1945), and was created by Gardner Fox and Martin Naydel.

The second Turtle (the Turtle Man) first appeared in Showcase #4 (October 1956), and was created by Robert Kanigher and Carmine Infantino.

== Fictional character biography ==
=== Golden Age version ===
The original Turtle is an old man and enemy of the Golden Age Flash (Jay Garrick) who lacks powers and primarily relies on methodical planning. After a few clashes with the Flash, the Turtle fades from the public eye.

Years later, the Turtle Man carries on his legacy. After the debut of the third Flash (Wally West), the original Turtle returns, now with the younger Turtle Man as his henchman, to take over Keystone City from underground. A final clash with Wally and his allies results in the Turtle destroying his own headquarters and apparently himself with it.

=== Silver Age version ===
The Turtle Man (sometimes simply calling himself "the Turtle") is the first gimmicked Rogue fought by the second Flash (Barry Allen) and appears in Central City shortly after Barry's debut as the Flash. Originally using his natural slowness as a weapon, such as returning to rob a bank vault later to place people off guard, Turtle is also an independently wealthy scientific genius who creates fantastic devices based on slowness. After some years, the first Turtle returns and meets his "successor". Impressed with the latter's scientific talent, the first Turtle becomes an ally in an attempt to take over Keystone City. A lab accident seriously cripples the Turtle Man during this time. After Wally West and his allies find the Turtle's underground headquarters, the original Turtle seemingly kills himself while the younger Turtle Man is taken into custody.

The Turtle Man later resurfaces, having recovered from his injuries and developed the ability to 'steal' speed, slowing down others around him to a crawl no matter how fast they are moving. During Infinite Crisis, he joins Alexander Luthor Jr.'s Secret Society of Super Villains.

=== Still Force entity ===
In Scott Snyder's Justice League series, the Turtle is re-imagined as using the Still Force, the embodiment of inertia and entropy and the Speed Force's opposite. It is later revealed that Turtle is a child prodigy who came from an abusive household. He spent most of his time with his wife and two children, slowing down his career and allowing his peers to surpass him. Growing jealous of his peers, he began experimenting with a mysterious energy force that he believed kept the universe moving forward. His experiment quickly meandered out of control, which rapidly aged him into an old man, but prevented him from aging further. His family helped him through the recovery process, which allowed him to regain his mobility.

He experimented with this energy force for decades, discovering he could negate any form of motion, including the progression of life. Eventually, he became disillusioned with human life, knowing that he would outlive everyone he loved. This led him to kill his family, as he saw them as a needless distraction from his work.

=== Jai West ===
A possible future version of Wally West's son Jai West who became a superhero called the Turtle appears in Doomsday Clock.

== Powers and abilities ==
The second Turtle wears a device that can project force fields and has small jets built into his armor. He additionally wields two guns that respectively slow movement and make others perceive the world faster.

The third Turtle wields the Still Force, enabling him to negate motion, drain life force, and create energy constructs.

== Other characters named the Turtle ==
Several unrelated villains who called themselves the Turtle:

- The Turtle is a gangster who fought Robotman.
- The Turtle is a pirate and criminal who fought Green Arrow and Speedy.

== In other media ==
=== Television ===
- An unidentified incarnation of the Turtle makes a cameo appearance in the Justice League Unlimited episode "Flash and Substance".
- Original incarnations of the Turtle appear in The Flash:
  - The first incarnation, Russell Glosson, appears in the second season episode "Potential Energy", portrayed by Aaron Douglas. This version is a metahuman thief who can drain kinetic energy from his immediate surroundings. He is defeated by the Flash and killed by Harry Wells who uses his brain tissue for a speed-siphoning device for Zoom.
  - A female incarnation, Frida Novikov, appears in the sixth season episode "Death of the Speed Force", portrayed by Vanessa Walsh. This version is a Russian metahuman criminal who can manipulate time.

=== Film ===
An original incarnation of the Turtle, Victor Vesp, was planned to appear in David S. Goyer's cancelled Flash film.
