= All-Flash =

US comic book series

- Cover to All-Flash Quarterly #1 (Summer 1941) by E.E. Hibbard.

Publication information
- Publisher: DC Comics
- Schedule: Quarterly (#1–5); Bi-monthly (#6–32); One-shot (vol. 2 #1)
- Format: Ongoing series
- Genre: Superhero
- Publication date: (vol. 1) Summer 1941 – December 1947 / January 1948 (vol. 2) September 2007
- No. of issues: (vol. 1) 32 (vol. 2) 1
- Main character: The Flash

Creative team
- Created by: Gardner Fox; E. E. Hibbard
- Written by: Gardner Fox; Robert Kanigher; John Broome
- Artist(s): E. E. Hibbard; Harry Tschida; Lou Ferstadt; Martin Naydel; Lee Elias; Carmine Infantino

All-Flash, originally published as All-Flash Quarterly, was a comic book magazine series published by All-American Publications and later National Periodicals (DC Comics) featuring superhero Jay Garrick, the original Flash. The series was the first solo feature given to the Flash, who also appeared in the anthologies Flash Comics, All-Star Comics, and Comic Cavalcade. It ran for 32 issues from 1941 to 1947 and was originally published on a quarterly basis before changing over to a bi-monthly schedule with issue #6. Each issue regularly contained several stories featuring the Flash, as well as minor back-up features like Hop Harrigan, Butch McLobster, The Super Mobster, and Fat and Slat by cartoonist Ed Wheelan and, in later issues, Ton-O-Fun by Flash co-creator Harry Lampert.

== Publication history ==
=== Original series ===
The series debuted with a Summer 1941 cover date. Since the title Flash Comics was already in use another name was needed for the series, so it was decided that a contest was to be held in which readers were encouraged to submit their own ideas for the title of the new series. Twenty-five dollars in cash prizes were offered to the four best names submitted, with $10.00 promised to the 1st-place winner of the contest. To the first 500 who submitted a free copy of All-Star Comics #5 was offered. An advertisement for the contest appeared in the pages of All-Star Comics #4 stating "The Flash wins and becomes the next quarterly like Superman and Batman! Boys and girls! Here is a message from Gardner F. Fox and E.E. Hibbard, the author and artist of your favorite feature, the Flash!"

Thanks, Boys and Girls, for selecting our feature THE FLASH, for the next Quarterly like "Superman" and "Batman"! We were both very happy when we received the good news, but we suddenly discovered that we have a problem---and we'd like you to help us solve it!

As you know, the FLASH not only appears here in All-Star Comics but is also a regular feature of the monthly magazine, Flash Comics! Now here is our problem:

If we call our Quarterly simply The Flash, which seems like the natural thing to do, our editors feel that too many of you readers would confuse it with Flash Comics, the monthly magazine.

Your job will be to think up a suitable title for the Flash Quarterly that will distinguish it from Flash Comics. An example of a possible title would be Jay Garrick, the Flash or The Adventures of the Flash, etc. --- as long as it doesn't sound too much like Flash Comics.

— Gardner Fox & E. E. Hibbard, 1941

The winner of the contest was announced in the pages of All-Star Comics #5, with an ad featuring the cover art for the first issue of All-Flash.

Flash co-creator Gardner Fox wrote the bulk of the series, scripting the main feature in the first 24 issues. From issue #25 and on, the main Flash features in the book were scripted by writers Robert Kanigher and John Broome. Art duties for the series were handled by a host of contributors, like artist E. E. Hibbard, Harry Tschida, Lou Ferstadt, Martin Naydel, Lee Elias, and Carmine Infantino.

The series marked the first time writers Robert Kanigher and John Broome, and artist Carmine Infantino worked on the Flash character. Kanigher, Broome, and Infantino would later help create the Silver Age Flash, as well as his sidekick Kid Flash, who would in turn become the third incarnation of the character.

All-Flash ended its run in 1947 with issue #32

=== 2007 one-shot ===
The title returned in 2007 as a one-shot by writer Mark Waid and artists Karl Kerschl, Manuel Garcia, Joe Bennett, and Daniel Acuna, with cover art by Josh Middleton and a variant cover by Bill Sienkiewicz. The one-shot served as a lead-in to Flash vol. 2 #231.

== Notable issues ==
Issue	Note	Story title	Story writer	Story artist	Publication date
#5	First appearance of Winky, Blinky, and Noddy	Case of the "Patsy Colt"!	Gardner Fox	E. E. Hibbard	Summer 1942
#12	First appearance of The Thinker	Tumble Inn to Trouble	Gardner Fox	E. E. Hibbard	Fall 1943
#21	First appearance of The Turtle	The Fastest Man Alive vs. the Slowest Man Alive	Gardner Fox	Martin Naydel	Winter 1945
#22	First Flash story written by John Broome	The City of Shifting Sand	John Broome	Martin Naydel	April–May 1946
#24	First Flash story written by Robert Kanigher	Appointment with Destiny	Robert Kanigher	Martin Naydel	August–September 1946
#31	First Flash story drawn by Carmine Infantino	The Secret City	Robert Kanigher	Carmine Infantino	Oct–Nov 1947
#32	First appearance of the Star Sapphire and The Fiddler	The Amazing Star Sapphire! Duet of Danger	Robert Kanigher	Lee Elias	December 1947 – January 1948
