= Winky, Blinky, and Noddy =

DC Comics characters

- Cover to All-Flash #14 (Spring 1944) by E.E. Hibbard featuring Winky, Blinky, and Noddy

Publication information
- Publisher: DC Comics
- First appearance: All-Flash #5 (Summer 1942)
- Created by: Gardner Fox; E.E. Hibbard

In-story information
- Alter ego: 1940s: Winky Boylan; Noddy Moylan; Blinky Toylan; 1960 revival: Winky Moylan; Noddy Toylan; Blinky Boylan
- Supporting character of: Jay Garrick

Winky, Blinky, and Noddy are a trio of fictional comic book characters, created by writer Gardner Fox and artist E.E. Hibbard, who first appeared in books starring the Flash.

Their names were taken from Wynken, Blynken, and Nod, although their appearance and characterization was a spoof on the Three Stooges. Noddy Moylan was based on Moe Howard, and often gave the other two a Stooges-style smack. Winky Boylan's red curly hair imitated Larry Fine's. Blinky Toylan's eyes were covered with a shock of hair, recalling Shemp Howard. The comic books frequently referred to them as the "Three Dimwits", or variants like the "Three Numbskulls", the "Three Dopes", or the "Three Idiots".

== History ==
Winky, Blinky and Noddy first appeared in All-Flash #5 (1942), as incompetent small-time criminals working for a crooked stable owner. After the Flash captured the stable owner, the three henchmen decided to move on to more benign pursuits. In the story "The Ray That Changed Men's Souls!" in issue #6, they invented a ray that changed people's personalities—an invention that was quickly stolen by a gang and used to commit crimes. By the end of the story, the ray made them forget their own criminal pasts, and when the readers were asked if they wanted the trio to return, they gave an enthusiastic response. The trio wandered from job to job, usually causing trouble, and the Flash would have to get involved.

The Three Dimwits appeared in All-Flash until issue #29 (1947). As their popularity grew, they were featured in solo stories in All-American Comics from issue #73 (1946) to #82 (1947). Their appearances in Flash Comics began in issue #46 (October 1943) and ended in #79 (January 1947), and they were seen in Comic Cavalcade from issue #4 (Fall 1943) to #18 (December/January 1947).

Their antics extended outside their stories into fourth-wall breaking meta-commentary. As The Flash Companion explains: "The Three Dimwits even tried to sell their account of the latest Flash adventure to Sheldon Mayer in All-Flash #9 only to have Mayer produce a copy of that already-published issue. So they slipped into the All-American offices unannounced in issue #14 and replaced the scheduled story with one of their own -- forcing a frantic Mayer to stamp an "April Fool's Day" label on the splash page rather than miss the publication deadline".

== Revivals ==
Thirteen years later, in 1960, editor Julius Schwartz asked Gardner Fox to write another Dimwits story at the request of fan (and later Marvel Comics editor-in-chief) Roy Thomas. The story appeared in Flash #117, in the story "The Madcap Inventors of Central City". Despite the promise that they would appear again on a regular basis, negative reader reaction decided otherwise.

In Flash vol. 2, #161 (2000), the trio appeared in a flashback that explained why they had disappeared: they had stumbled across a sack full of money and retired to the Caribbean.

In Justice League: Cry for Justice #2 (2009), while volunteering as night guards at Flash Museum, they are killed by an unknown assailant who steals the Cosmic Treadmill. Jay investigates the trio's murder.
