= Flash of Two Worlds =

Comic book story

- Cover of The Flash #123 (September 1961); art by Carmine Infantino, pencils, and Murphy Anderson, inks.
- Publisher: DC Comics
- Publication date: September 1961
- Genre: Superhero
- Title(s): The Flash #123
- Main character(s): Flash (Barry Allen); Flash (Jay Garrick)

Creative team
- Writer: Gardner Fox
- Penciller: Carmine Infantino
- Inker: Joe Giella
- Editor: Julius Schwartz

"Flash of Two Worlds!" is a landmark comic book story that was published in The Flash #123 (Sept. 1961). It introduces Earth-Two, and more generally the concept of the multiverse, to DC Comics. The story was written by Gardner Fox under the editorial guidance of Julius Schwartz (whose subsequent autobiography was titled Man of Two Worlds), and illustrated by Carmine Infantino. In 2009, DC Comics released DC Comics Classics Library: The Flash of Two Worlds, which features the classic flagship story and other subsequent pre-Crisis Flash material.

== Plot summary ==
At a charity event organized by Iris West, Flash performs super-speed tricks to entertain the children there as the scheduled magician has not come. Recreating a rope climbing trick, the Flash begins vibrating his molecules when he suddenly disappears from the stage. He finds himself outside near an unfamiliar city, which he discovers to be Keystone City, the home of the Golden Age Flash. Keystone City is located on Earth-Two (not named as such in this story), (Note: The name "Earth-Two" does not appear until "Crisis on Earth-One!" in Justice League of America #21.) an Earth in a parallel universe. On Barry Allen's world, the Golden Age Flash is thought to be a fictional comic book character. Barry looks up Jay Garrick in the phone book and introduces himself to the older speedster. On this Earth, Jay had retired as the Flash years earlier, the year his comic book series was canceled on Earth-One, and married his longtime girlfriend, Joan Williams. Barry claims Gardner Fox's thoughts must have been tuned in to the events of Earth-Two.

Garrick says he is preparing to resume being the Flash and describes for Barry three incredible crimes that were committed recently. These thefts were perpetrated by three of Jay's former adversaries, Fiddler, Shade, and Thinker, who have joined forces. The Flashes split up, with Jay taking on the Thinker and Barry against the Shade, but they are unable to defeat them. The Flashes regroup and go after the Fiddler together, saving a man from a falling steel girder along the way.

Shade and Thinker meet up and realize that there are two Flashes. They hurry to warn the Fiddler of this turn of events, but the Fiddler has already managed to stop the Flashes with his musical powers. He commands the two speedsters to commit robberies for him. Just as the villainous trio are about to flee with their loot, the two Flashes capture them. It turns out that they had put small jewels in their ears to block the Fiddler's mind-control music after he told them to put them down and take larger jewels, then played along to fool the criminals. Barry returns to his Earth after Jay announces he is coming out of retirement and will continue as the Flash of his world.

== Effects of the story ==
The success of "Flash of Two Worlds" encouraged DC to revive many of its Golden Age characters. Eventually, crossovers between the two Earths would become an annual feature in the Justice League of America comics, beginning with issue #21, "Crisis on Earth-One!" (August 1963), and culminating in the 1985 miniseries Crisis on Infinite Earths.

The cover itself has become an iconic image, and has been referenced in many covers including Flash #147 (Sep. 1964), Dark Horse Presents #67 (November 1992), Flash vol. 2 #123 (Mar. 1997), Impulse #70 (Mar. 2001), Flash Rebirth #5 (Jan. 2010), and The Flash #9 (Oct. 2016) as part of the Rebirth relaunch.

In 2004, a near-mint copy of The Flash #123 sold in a Heritage auction for $83,000.

In Final Crisis #2 (August 2008), the location of this story is revisited by Wally West (the third Flash) and Jay Garrick (the first Flash). By this time, the Central City community center has become an abandoned strip club. Later in the same issue, it becomes the location for the return of Barry Allen, following his death in Crisis on Infinite Earths #8 (November 1985).

== In other media ==
- The comic is featured in The Big Bang Theory episode "The Jiminy Conjecture". It is the comic book Sheldon loses in a cricket identification bet to Howard, and he can be seen holding it near the episode's conclusion.
- The concept of the Golden Age Flash being a comic book character on the Silver Age's Earth, and his retirement on his Earth coinciding with the cancellation of the series, is reused in the Justice League episode "Legends". It features the titular team visiting a Golden Age-era reality that is home to the Justice Guild of America, a team similar to the Justice Society who are fictional characters in the League's universe. John Stewart says the comic series was canceled and the League later deduce that this occurred when the Guild was killed in their timeline.
- The Flash episode "Flash of Two Worlds" uses the title of the original story. It also contains a brief scene reminiscent of the cover, when the two Flashes run around opposite sides of a brick wall to check on a hostage after a fight with Sand Demon. In the show, Barry and Jay's situations are reversed: Jay (later revealed to be Hunter Zolomon, who took the place of the real Jay who was held captive by him) finds himself stranded on Earth-1, whereas in the comic, Barry arrives on Earth-2 (although he is able to leave at the end).
