= Jay Garrick =

Fictional superhero in the DC Comics universe

- Jay Garrick as depicted on the variant cover of The Flash #750 (March 2020). Art by Nicola Scott and Annette Kwok.

Publication information
- Publisher: DC Comics
- First appearance: Flash Comics #1 (cover-dated January 1940; published November 20, 1939)
- Created by: Gardner Fox; Harry Lampert

In-story information
- Alter ego: Jason Peter "Jay" Garrick
- Species: Metahuman
- Team affiliations: Justice Society of America; All-Star Squadron; Justice League International; Justice League
- Partnerships: Speedster partners: Barry Allen; Wally West; Bart Allen; Max Mercury; Other hero partners: Wildcat (Ted Grant); Green Lantern (Alan Scott)
- Abilities: See list: Immense superhuman speed, agility, reflexes, and stamina via speed force aura conduit; Vortex creations; Decelerated aging; Speed force empathy; Dimensional travel; Augmented by the extra-dimensional Speed Force; Frictionless aura; Intangibility via molecular vibration; Electrokinesis; Accelerated healing process; Speed theft/granting; Expert combatant

Jason Peter "Jay" Garrick is a superhero appearing in American comic books published by DC Comics. He is the first character known as the Flash. The character first appeared in Flash Comics #1 on November 20, 1939, created by writer Gardner Fox and artist Harry Lampert.

In the original Golden Age comics, Jay Garrick gained his speed-enhancing abilities by inhaling hard water vapor during a lab experiment. This accident granted him superhuman speed and agility, allowing him to become the Flash and fight crime.

Jay Garrick has made numerous appearances in other media. For television series on The CW, John Wesley Shipp portrayed the character as a recurring character in The Flash and in a guest capacity in Stargirl. Additionally, Billy Mitchell played the character's live-action debut as a cameo in Smallville, with a cameo appearance in The Flash (2023) portrayed via CGI and modeled after editor Jason Ballantine.

== Creation ==
The character of Jay Garrick was created by writer Gardner Fox and artist Harry Lampert. In an interview, Lampert commented on the character's creation. "The idea of the Flash was Gardner Fox's idea...it was supposed to be based upon the god Mercury… I went into the dictionary and there's the most beautiful rendition of Mercury and then I took my Flash and superimposed [them together] and they were almost identical, the pose is the same except a few doodads, and as I did it, I kept it as close as possible to that graceful attitude.".

== Publication history ==
First appearance in Flash Comics #1 (November 20, 1939). Cover by Sheldon Moldoff.

Jay Garrick first appeared in Flash Comics #1, which was published on November 20, 1939 by All-American Publications. He was soon featured in All-Star Comics as a founding member of the Justice Society of America. In 1941, he received a solo comic book series, All-Flash.

After World War II, superheroes declined in popularity, causing many of the Flash's comic book series to be canceled. All-Flash was canceled in 1948 after 32 issues. Flash Comics was canceled in 1949 after 104 issues. All-Star Comics was canceled in 1951 after 57 issues, marking Garrick's last Golden Age appearance. The character did not appear again for ten years and would not have another solo series until the 2023 series "The New Golden Age".

In 1956, DC Comics reinvented the Flash character, giving him a new costume, name, and background. This new Flash, named Barry Allen, was completely unrelated to Jay Garrick, with the latter becoming a fictional character in-universe.

Jay Garrick made a guest appearance in Flash #123, "Flash of Two Worlds". In this issue, Garrick was treated as residing in a parallel universe (Earth-Two), which allowed the character to exist without any continuity conflicts with Barry Allen (who existed on Earth-One), yet allowed him to make guest appearances in Silver Age books. For most of the 60s and 70s, Garrick made guest appearances. However, starting in 1976, Garrick became a regular character in the revived All-Star Comics, partaking in adventures with the Justice Society in stories set in modern times. In 1981, he and the Justice Society appeared in All-Star Squadron in stories set during World War II.

In 1985, DC Comics merged all of its fictional characters into a single shared universe. Jay Garrick now shares the same world as the New Flash. DC wrote the character out of continuity in the one-shot Last Days of the Justice Society but brought the character back in the 1990s due to fan interest. Unlike characters such as Batman or Superman, DC decided not to update Garrick as a young hero, portraying him as a veteran of World War II with a magically prolonged lifespan. Garrick became a regular character in the JSA and Justice Society of America.

== Fictional character biography ==
=== Origin ===
Jay Garrick as the Flash, in his original costume, during the 1940s, in a page of Flash Comics #1 (January 1940). Art by the character's co-creator Harry Lampert.

Jason Peter Garrick is a college student. Prior to 1940 (later retconned to 1938) while working for his academic advisor Professor Hughes, Jay accidentally inhaled hard water vapors after taking a smoke break in his laboratory where he had been working (later stories would change this to heavy water vapors). As a result, he finds that he can run at superhuman speed and has similarly fast reflexes. Retcons imply that the inhalation simply activated a latent metagene.

After a brief career as a college football star, he dons a red shirt with a lightning bolt and a stylized metal helmet with wings (based on images of the Roman god Mercury). He then begins to fight crime as the Flash. The helmet belonged to his father Joseph who fought during World War I. He sometimes uses the helmet as a weapon or a type of shield, as seen in Infinite Crisis. He has also used it to direct a beam of light at Eclipso. In The Flash: Rebirth (2010), he used it to destabilize the Reverse Flash.

In the early stories, Jay's identity appears to be public knowledge. Later stories would show him as having his identity secret, and that he maintains it without the use of a mask by constantly "vibrating" his face, making him difficult to recognize or clearly photograph. Garrick ultimately revealed his identity as the Flash to the world.

During his career, he would often find himself embroiled in semi-comic situations inadvertently initiated by Winky, Blinky, and Noddy, a trio of tramps known as the Three Dimwits, who tried their hand at one job after another, never successfully.

His first case involves battling the Faultless Four, a group of blackmailers (Sieur Satan, Serge Orloff, Duriel, and Smythe), who plot to steal an atomic bombarder and sell it. It is later revealed that a professor named Edward Clariss found the last container of heavy water vapor and used it to gain super-speed, becoming the Rival. He briefly takes away Jay's speed after capturing him, making him super slow, but Jay uses the gases again, allowing him to regain his super speed and defeat the Rival.

Like the Flashes who followed him, Garrick became a close friend of Green Lantern Alan Scott, whom he met through the Justice Society of America.

=== Justice Society of America ===
The Flash soon became one of the best-known of the Golden Age of superheroes. He was a founding member of the Justice Society of America and served as its first chairman. He was originally based in New York City, but this was later retconned to be in the fictional Keystone City. He left the JSA after issue #6 but returned several years later (issue #24, spring 1945). He had a distinguished career as a crime-fighter during the 1940s.

Garrick's early history was largely the subject of retcons. A story explaining the retirement of the JSA members, including the Flash, explained that, in 1951, the JSA was investigated by the House Un-American Activities Committee for possible Communist sympathies and asked to reveal their identities. This was later revealed to be partly caused by Per Degaton. The JSA declined, and Garrick, who recently married his longtime girlfriend, Joan, retired from superhero life. As a trained scientist, he ran an experimental laboratory for several decades.

The All-Star Squadron Annual #3 issue states that the JSA fought a being named Ian Karkull, who imbued them with energy that slowed their aging, allowing Garrick and many others – as well as their girlfriends and sidekicks – to remain active into the late 20th century without infirmity. The 1990s Starman series notes that the Shade prompted Garrick to come out of retirement in the 1950s, but the details of his activities during this time are unclear.

=== Earth-Two ===
Garrick emerged from retirement in 1961 to meet the Silver Age Flash, Barry Allen, from a parallel world. The rest of the JSA soon joined the Flash, although their activities during the 1960s (other than their annual meeting with Earth-One's Justice League of America) were unrecorded, although it is clear that Garrick and Green Lantern (Alan Scott) were good friends. It is also established that Garrick has become a respected scientist on his Earth.

Garrick was a key member of the JSA's 1970s adventures (as chronicled in All-Star Comics and Adventure Comics). Garrick also helped to launch the careers of Infinity, Inc. Following the Crisis on Infinite Earths, all the parallel worlds are merged into one, and Keystone City becomes the twin city of Allen's Central City, with the two separated by a river. An updated story suggests that Keystone in this new continuity was rendered invisible and wiped from the memories of the world for many years through the actions of several supervillains.

=== 21st Century ===
Jay Garrick, into the 21st century as an aged superhero. Cover art for JSA #78 by Alex Ross.

In the early 21st century, many of Garrick's JSA cohorts have retired or died, but Garrick remains active with the latest incarnation of the group. He is physically about 50 years old, thanks to the effects of several accidental anti-aging treatments, but his chronological age is closer to 105. He is one of the few surviving members of the Justice Society of America after Zero Hour: Crisis in Time!. Of the three original JSA members still on the team (along with Alan Scott and Wildcat), Jay takes a fatherly approach toward his teammates and the DC superhero community in general.

=== Infinite Crisis and One Year Later ===
Garrick and his wife, Joan, had guardianship of Bart Allen after Max Mercury's disappearance. During the events of Infinite Crisis, Garrick states that the Speed Force is gone after a battle in which many speedsters, living and dead, wrestle Superboy-Prime into the Speed Force and disappear. Garrick is left behind on Earth by the other speedsters when he reaches his speed limit and cannot follow. Bart Allen returns, aged several years, having absorbed the entire Speed Force during his pursuit of the escaped Superboy-Prime. Garrick claims that without the Speed Force, his own power is less than before: like Wally West in the Crisis on Infinite Earths aftermath, he can only run close to the speed of sound. He also states that, as the Speed Force is no longer slowing his aging, his speed is diminishing with time. After Bart leaves Keystone City for Los Angeles, Garrick, once again, is the city's sole guardian. After learning that Bart has been killed by the Rogues, Garrick collapses with grief, consoled by Jesse Chambers.

Garrick continues his work as a member of the reformed Justice Society of America, under the leadership of Power Girl. After the death of Bart Allen, Garrick's full speed returns. Garrick is currently the mayor of Monument Point, where the JSA is now based. He faces problems due to the JSA being based in the Town, but after talking to another official, who says that, as Garrick is not a politician, he does not have to worry about being re-elected, Garrick gains confidence. Soon after this, he holds a funeral for Alan Scott, who is killed defeating the villain D'arken, and tells the Justice Society that they must endure.

==== Velocity ====
In the Outsiders: One Year Later story arc, a clone of the character called Velocity appears as an antagonist, created by the Brotherhood of Evil. He appears to be in his late 20s or early 30s and is brainwashed into working for the Malinese dictator Ratu Bennin. Velocity is defeated by the combined efforts of the Outsiders. He possesses Jay Garrick's super-speed, but none of his memories or expertise. His unconscious body is placed in the custody of Alan Scott, Checkmate's White King, who states that the Outsiders could not be trusted.

Because of lingering issues in the cloning process, made more unpredictable by the metagene itself, the clone is infected by a fast-acting version of the clone plague deteriorating and shortening the lifespan of clones in the DC Universe. This makes it difficult for Checkmate to find a way to wake him and undo his brainwash, because, even with his special suit, tailored to stave the degenerating process, he would be doomed to a slow death whenever he awakens from his suspended animation.

=== Brightest Day ===
In Brightest Day, Garrick and the rest of the JSA help Alan Scott and his children overcome the power of the Starheart, and, in turn, help save the planet from the Dark Avatar. After the events of the Brightest Day, Garrick and the rest of the JSA travel to the city of Monument Point, which has been attacked by a superpowered terrorist named Scythe. Just before being defeated, Scythe snaps Jay's long standing friend Alan Scott's neck. In the following story, it is revealed that Scythe is the product of Nazi genetic engineering, and that Scott and Garrick had been tasked by the president with killing him back when he was in infancy during World War II. The two heroes could not agree on a course of action, and, as a result, Scythe was allowed to live. Doctor Mid-Nite discovers that the injuries Scott sustained have paralyzed Scott, and that any attempt to heal himself could break his constant concentration, which could result in the Starheart once again regaining control of his body.

Jade visits her bedridden father in the Emerald City, and offers to use her abilities to help him walk again. Scott declines his daughter's offer, reasoning that if the Starheart were to once again take over his body, it could kill everyone in the city. Eclipso attacks the city, which results in Jesse Quick having to get Scott to safety.

Later, the JSA tries to take down the villain D'arken, who has escaped from Monument Point and absorbed the powers of JSA members, but D'arken is too powerful for the JSA to take him down. Due to the entity's ability to absorb powers from superhumans in its vicinity, only non-superpowered and magical members fight D'arken. The JSA tells Alan Scott that unleashing the Starheart is the only way to destroy D'arken. However, Scott's body incinerates itself and he is presumed dead.

=== DC Rebirth ===
Jay Garrick is not present following The New 52 continuity reboot. Doomsday Clock reveals this to be the result of Doctor Manhattan altering the timeline and erasing the Justice Society from existence. However, he is restored when Superman convinces Manhattan to restore the timeline. The New Golden Age storyline reveals that Jay and Joan had a daughter named Judy who was the former's sidekick before being kidnapped by the Time Masters. In the resulting Jay Garrick: The Flash series, it is revealed that Jay's college professor Dr Hughes from Flash Comics #1 (1940) was in fact the supervillain Doctor Elemental, who engineered the lab accident that made Jay into the Flash; Jay was the only survivor. Elemental was the archenemy of Flash and Boom in forgotten 1960s adventures. After Boom is rescued by Stargirl in the present day, she returns home to her parents, whose memories are restored.

== Powers and abilities ==
As the Flash, Garrick can run at superhuman speeds and has superhumanly-fast reflexes, tapping into the Speed Force. The limits of his speed have fluctuated over the years, though he has usually been second to DC's "flagship" Flash, Barry Allen and his successor, Wally West.

In his earliest appearances, Garrick's speed was derived from a metagene that activated after he inhaled hard water vapors. By his own account, he initially could run just shy of the speed of sound. He could carry people away with him at super-speed without causing injury due to extreme acceleration. He could make himself invisible by vibrating his body at high frequencies and disguise his features by vibrating his molecules. Once he met Barry Allen, he surpassed his limitations, citing running at 'twenty times the speed of sound', seemingly able to tap into the Speed Force. He has since displayed speed absorption, time travel and interdimensional shifting abilities.

When Bart Allen absorbed the Speed Force during "Infinite Crisis", Jay's speed was diminished to the same level as his early adventures. He struggled to surpass the speed of sound and lost many of his higher powers. Once the Speed Force returned, Jay's powers were fully restored.

== Collected editions ==
Title	Material collected	Published date	ISBN
The Golden Age Flash Archives Vol. 1	Flash Comics #1–17	September 1999	978-1563895067
The Golden Age Flash Archives Vol. 2	Flash Comics #18–24, All Flash Comics #1–2	February 2006	978-1401207847
The Greatest Flash Stories Ever Told	Flash Comics #1, 66, 86, Comic Cavalcade #24, Showcase #4, The Flash (vol. 1) #107, 113, 119, 124, 125, 137, 143, 148, 179, Five-Star Super-Hero Spectacular, The Flash (vol. 2) #2	January 1991	978-0930289843
The Flash: The Greatest Stories Ever Told	Flash Comics #86, 104, The Flash (vol. 1) #123, 155, 165, 179, The Flash (vol. 2) #91, DC Special Series #11	August 2007	978-1401213725

== Other versions ==
Earth 2's Jay Garrick from the cover of Earth 2 #2.

- An alternate universe version of Jay Garrick appears in JSA: The Liberty Files. This version is an intelligence agent stationed in Russia, working under the code-name Mercury.
- An alternate universe version of Jay Garrick from Earth-2 appears in The New 52. This version received his super-speed from Mercury.
- Several alternate universe versions of Jay Garrick appear in 52.
- An alternate universe version of Jay Garrick appears in Flashpoint. This version died after inhaling hard water.
- An alternate universe version of Jay Garrick appears in Absolute Flash. This version was a scientist tasked with investigating a pocket dimension, the Still Point. Fearing repercussions, he attempted to shut down the project, only to be pushed into the Still Point by his colleague Eobard Thawne, where he eventually died.

== In other media ==
=== Television ===
==== Animation ====
- An analogue of Jay Garrick called The Streak appears in the Justice League two-part episode "Legends", voiced by David Naughton. He was a speedster from an alternate universe and member of the Justice Guild of America who died alongside his team during a war that destroyed most of their home universe.
- Jay Garrick / Flash appears in Batman: The Brave and the Bold, voiced by Andy Milder. This version is an ally of Batman and member of the Justice Society of America (JSA).
- Jay Garrick / Flash appears in Young Justice, voiced by Geoff Pierson. This version is a retired member of the Justice Society of America (JSA) who does not possess his comic book counterpart's slowed aging process. Throughout the series, Jay and Joan Garrick serve as Bart Allen's legal guardians while Jay comes out of retirement to help the Justice League and the Team thwart a Reach invasion. As of the fourth season, Jay has joined the Justice League.
- Jay Garrick / Flash appears in the Mad segment "That's What Super Friends Are For".
- Jay Garrick / Flash appears in the Teen Titans Go! episode "Justice League's Next Top Talent Idol Star: Dance Crew Edition".

==== Live-action ====
John Wesley Shipp as Jay Garrick / The Flash on The Flash.

- Jay Garrick appears in the Smallville two-part episode "Absolute Justice", portrayed by Billy Mitchell. This version operated as a superhero, member of the Justice Society of America (JSA), and a research scientist in the 1970s until he was framed for fraud as part of the government's plot to disable the JSA. Garrick and his teammates falsely confessed to all charges, but were never convicted and forced to retire due to their secret identities becoming known to law enforcement.
- Jay Garrick appeared in the Arrowverse series The Flash (2014).
  - Teddy Sears was initially advertised as portraying an Earth-2 equivalent throughout the second season until his character was revealed to be Hunter Zolomon who used identity theft to deceive the public (see below).
  - John Wesley Shipp portrays the real Garrick, the Flash of Earth-3 and doppelgänger of Henry Allen. In the second season, he was held captive in a failed attempt to siphon his Speed Force energy before he is eventually freed by Team Flash. Garrick returns in the third season as a stern mentor to Barry Allen while helping him defeat Savitar. In the fourth season, Garrick helps Barry and Jesse Quick avert a disaster utilizing "Flashtime", a state in which speedsters move so fast that time appears to be frozen, and announces his retirement. As of the sixth season, Garrick has retired, settled down with Joan Williams, and worked with her to track antimatter signatures across the multiverse before later helping Barry uncover information about an impending "Crisis". After the Crisis, the seventh and eighth seasons show Jay residing on Earth-Prime Keystone City, where Joan helps restore his speed and body.
- Jay Garrick / Flash appears in Stargirl, portrayed by an uncredited actor in the first season and portrayed again by John Wesley Shipp in subsequent seasons. This version is a member of the Justice Society of America (JSA). A decade prior to the series, the team was attacked and killed by the Injustice Society, with Garrick being apparently killed by Icicle. After making appearances in flashbacks depicted in the second season, Garrick turns up alive 20 years later in the third-season finale "Frenemies – Chapter Thirteen: The Reckoning".
- Jay Garrick / Flash appears in the Stuart Fails to Save the Universe episode "Spoiler: We Couldn't Get Green Lantern", portrayed by Andy Ridings.

=== Film ===
- Jay Garrick / Flash makes a non-speaking cameo appearance in Justice League: The New Frontier, being forced out of heroics by the government.
- The Earth-2 incarnation of Jay Garrick / Flash appears in Justice Society: World War II, voiced by Armen Taylor. This version is a founding member of the Justice Society of America who was active during his Earth's version of the titular war.
- A version of Jay Garrick from the universe of Adventures of Superman makes a cameo appearance in The Flash (2023), portrayed via CGI and modeled after editor Jason Ballantine. It was initially reported that the character's likeness was that of Teddy Sears, but the studio stated Garrick's appearance was not based on any one actor.
- Jay Garrick / Flash appears in Justice League: Crisis on Infinite Earths, voiced again by Armen Taylor.
- Jay Garrick makes a cameo appearance in Superman via a mural at the Hall of Justice.

=== Video games ===
- Jay Garrick / Flash appears in Batman: The Brave and the Bold - The Videogame, voiced again by Andy Milder.
- Jay Garrick / Flash appears in DC Universe Online, voiced by Ryan Wickerham.
- The Earth-2 incarnation of Jay Garrick / Flash appears as a downloadable costume for Barry Allen / Flash in Injustice: Gods Among Us.
- Jay Garrick / Flash appears as a character summon in Scribblenauts Unmasked: A DC Comics Adventure.
- Jay Garrick / Flash appears as a "premier skin" for Barry Allen / Flash in Injustice 2, voiced by Travis Willingham.
- Jay Garrick / Flash appears as a playable character in DC Legends.

=== Miscellaneous ===
- Jay Garrick / Flash appears in Justice League Unlimited #12.
- The Smallville incarnation of Jay Garrick / Flash appears in Smallville Season 11, in which it is revealed that his leg was disabled and that he could no longer run at superhuman speed, which allowed the government to arrest him. After he retired, he became a recluse. In the present, Clark Kent and Bart Allen find Garrick and consult him on how to defeat the Black Flash. After Bart sacrifices himself to defeat the Black Flash, the guilt-ridden Garrick forms a school for gifted children in San Francisco as well as the Teen Titans and goes on to get his leg repaired.
- Jay Garrick / Flash appears in the Injustice: Gods Among Us prequel comic as a charter member of the Justice Society of America (JSA) and a friend of Barry Allen. After the Joker obtains an amulet that allows the owner to possess individuals, he uses it on the JSA to hurt the Justice League, eventually forcing Garrick to kill himself.
- Jay Garrick / Flash appears as part of Lego's DC Super Heroes minifigure series.
