= Carmine Infantino =

American comic book artist (1925–2013)

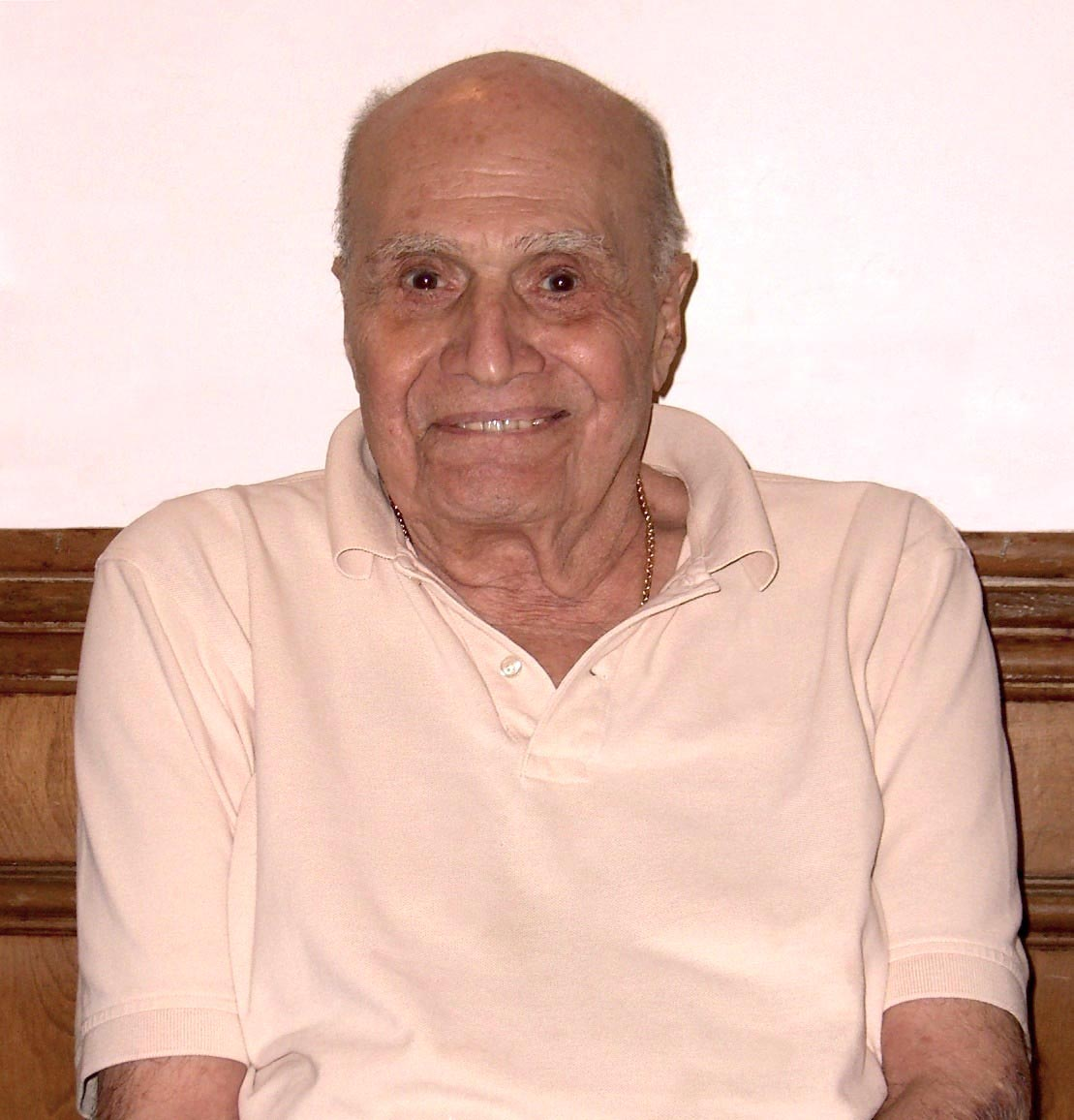
- Infantino in 2010
- Born: May 24, 1925 New York City, U.S.
- Died: April 4, 2013 (aged 87) New York City, U.S.
- Areas: Penciller, Editor, Publisher
- Notable works: Detective Comics, Flash, Showcase, Star Wars
- Awards: Full list

Carmine Infantino (/ɪnfənˈtiːnoʊ/; May 24, 1925 – April 4, 2013) was an American comics artist and editor, primarily for DC Comics, during the late 1950s and early 1960s period known as the Silver Age of Comic Books. Among his character creations are the Black Canary and the Silver Age version of the Flash with writer Robert Kanigher, Elongated Man with John Broome, the Barbara Gordon incarnation of Batgirl with writer Gardner Fox, Deadman with writer Arnold Drake, and Christopher Chance, the second iteration of the Human Target, with Len Wein.

He was inducted into comics' Will Eisner Award Hall of Fame in 2000.

== Early life and family ==
Carmine Infantino was born via midwife in his family's apartment in Brooklyn, New York City. His father, Pasquale "Patrick" Infantino, born in New York City, was originally a musician who played saxophone, clarinet, and violin, and had a band with composer Harry Warren. During the Great Depression, he turned to a career as a licensed plumber. Infantino's mother, Angela Rosa DellaBadia, emigrated from Calitri, a hill town northeast of Naples, Italy.

Infantino attended Public Schools 75 and 85 in Brooklyn before going on to the School of Industrial Art (later renamed the High School of Art and Design) in Manhattan. During his freshman year of high school, Infantino began working for Harry "A" Chesler, whose studio was one of a handful of comic-book "packagers" who created complete comics for publishers looking to enter the emerging field in the 1930s–1940s Golden Age of Comic Books. As Infantino recalled:

I used to go around as a youngster into companies, go in and try to meet people — nothing ever happened. One day I went to this place on 23rd Street, this old broken-down warehouse, and I met Harry Chesler. Now, I was told he was a mean guy and he used people and he took artists. But he was very sweet to me. He said, 'Look, kid. You come up here, I'll give you a dollar a day, just study art, learn, and grow.' That was damn nice of him, I thought. He did that for me for a whole summer.

Infantino was the uncle of musician Jim Infantino, whose 2003 album They're Everywhere featured a song called "The Ballad of Barry Allen". Infantino created the artwork for the album cover.

== Career ==
With Frank Giacoia penciling, Infantino inked the feature "Jack Frost" in USA Comics #3 (cover-dated Jan. 1942), from Timely Comics, the forerunner of Marvel Comics. He wrote in his autobiography that

...Frank Giacoia and I were in constant contact. One day in '40 we decided to go up to Timely Comics ... to see if we could get some work. They gave us a script called 'Jack Frost' and that story became our first published work. Frank did the pencils and I did the inking. Joe Simon was the editor and he offered us both a staff job. Frank quit school and took the job. I wanted desperately to quit school and I told my father that it was a great opportunity. He said, 'No way! You're gonna finish school.' Things were very bad, he was desperate for money, but he wouldn't let me quit school. He said, 'School comes first. If you're that good, the job will be there later.' I can't love the man enough for that. So Frank took the job and I didn't. I was 15 or 16 and I just kept making my rounds in the early '40s, looking for freelance work while continuing my studies.

Infantino would eventually work for several publishers during the decade, drawing Human Torch and Angel stories for Timely; Airboy and Heap stories for Hillman Periodicals; working for packager Jack Binder, who supplied Fawcett Comics; briefly at Holyoke Publishing; then landing at DC Comics. Infantino's first published work for DC was "The Black Canary", a six-page Johnny Thunder story in Flash Comics #86 (Aug. 1947) that introduced the superheroine the Black Canary. Infantino's long association with the Flash mythos began with "The Secret City" a story in All-Flash #31 (Oct.–Nov. 1947). He additionally became a regular artist of the Golden Age Green Lantern and the Justice Society of America.

During the 1950s, Infantino freelanced for Joe Simon and Jack Kirby's company, Prize Comics, drawing the series Charlie Chan. Back at DC, during a lull in the popularity of superheroes, Infantino drew Westerns, mysteries, science fiction comics.

=== The Silver Age ===
In 1956, DC editor Julius Schwartz assigned Infantino and writer Robert Kanigher to the company's first attempt at reviving superheroes: an updated version of the Flash who would appear in issue #4 (Oct. 1956) of the anthology series Showcase. Infantino designed the now-classic red uniform with yellow detail (reminiscent of Captain Marvel), striving to keep it as streamlined as possible, and he drew on his design abilities to create a new visual language to depict the Flash's speed, using vertical and horizontal motion lines to make the figure a red and yellow blur. The success of the Flash heralded the wholesale return of superheroes, and the beginning of what fans and historians call the Silver Age of comics.

Showcase #4 (Oct. 1956): The Silver Age starts. Cover art by Infantino and Joe Kubert.

Infantino drew "Flash of Two Worlds," a landmark story published in The Flash #123 (Sept. 1961) that introduced Earth-Two and the concept of the multiverse to DC Comics. Infantino continued to work for Schwartz in his other features and titles, most notably "Adam Strange" in Mystery in Space, succeeding the character's initial artist, Mike Sekowsky. In 1964, Schwartz was made responsible for reviving the faded Batman titles. Writer John Broome and artist Infantino jettisoned the series' sillier aspects (such as Ace the Bat-Hound and Bat-Mite) and gave the "New Look" Batman and Robin a more detective-oriented direction and sleeker draftsmanship that proved a hit combination.

Other features and characters Infantino drew at DC include "The Space Museum", and Elongated Man. With Gardner Fox, Infantino co-created the Blockbuster in Detective Comics #345 (Nov. 1965) and Barbara Gordon as a new version of Batgirl in Detective Comics #359 (Jan. 1967). Writer Arnold Drake and Infantino created the supernatural superhero Deadman in Strange Adventures #205 (Oct. 1967). This story included the first known depiction of narcotics in a story approved by the Comics Code Authority.

=== DC Comics editorial director ===
In late 1966/early 1967, Infantino was tasked by Irwin Donenfeld with designing covers for the entire DC line. Stan Lee learned this and approached Infantino with a $22,000 offer to move to Marvel. Publisher Jack Liebowitz confirmed that DC could not match the offer, but could promote Infantino to the position of art director. Initially reluctant, Infantino accepted what Liebowitz posed as a challenge, and stayed with DC. When DC was sold to Kinney National Company, Infantino was promoted to editorial director. He started by hiring new talent, and promoting artists to editorial positions. He hired Dick Giordano away from Charlton Comics, and made artists Joe Orlando, Joe Kubert and Mike Sekowsky editors. New talents such as artist Neal Adams and writer Dennis O'Neil were brought into the company. Several of DC's older characters were revamped by O'Neil including Wonder Woman; Batman; Green Lantern and Green Arrow; and Superman.

In 1970, Infantino signed on Marvel Comics' star artist and storytelling collaborator Jack Kirby to a DC Comics contract. Beginning with Superman's Pal Jimmy Olsen, Kirby created his Fourth World saga that wove through that existing title and three new series he created. After the "Fourth World" titles were canceled, Kirby created several other series for DC including OMAC, Kamandi, The Demon, and, together with former partner Joe Simon for one last time, a new incarnation of the Sandman before returning to freelancing for Marvel in 1975.

=== DC Comics publisher ===
Infantino was made DC's publisher in early 1971, during a time of declining circulation for the company's comics, and he attempted a number of changes. In an effort to increase revenue, he raised the cover price of DC's comics from 15 to 25 cents, simultaneously raising the page-count by adding reprints and new backup features. Marvel met the price increase, then dropped back to 20 cents; DC stayed at 25 cents for about a year, a decision that ultimately proved bad for overall sales.

Infantino and writer Len Wein co-created the "Human Target" feature in Action Comics #419 (December 1972). The character was adapted into a short-lived ABC television series starring Rick Springfield which debuted in July 1992.

After consulting with screenwriter Mario Puzo on the plots of Superman: The Movie and Superman II, Infantino collaborated with Marvel on the crossover publication Superman vs. the Amazing Spider-Man. In January 1976, Warner Communications replaced Infantino with magazine publisher Jenette Kahn, a person new to the comics field. Infantino returned to drawing freelance.

=== Later career ===
Spider-Woman #8 (Nov. 1978). Cover art by Infantino and Steve Leialoha.

Infantino later drew for a number of titles for Warren Publishing and Marvel, including the latter's Star Wars, Spider-Woman, and Nova. His brief collaboration with Jim Shooter saw the introduction of Paladin in Daredevil #150 (Jan. 1978). During Infantino's tenure on the Star Wars series, it was one of the industry's top selling titles. In 1981, he returned to DC Comics and co-created a revival of the "Dial H for Hero" feature with writer Marv Wolfman in a special insert in Legion of Super-Heroes #272 (February 1981). He and writer Cary Bates crafted a Batman backup story for Detective Comics #500 (March 1981). Infantino returned to The Flash title with issue #296 (April 1981) and drew the series until its cancellation with issue #350 (October 1985). He drew The Flash #300 (Aug. 1981), which was in the Dollar Comics format, and was one of the artists on the double-sized Justice League of America #200 (March 1982), his chapter featuring the Flash and Elongated Man, characters he had co-created.

He was one of the contributors to the DC Challenge limited series in 1986. Other projects in the 1980s included penciling The Daring New Adventures of Supergirl, a Red Tornado miniseries, and a comic book tie-in to the television series V. In 1990, he followed Marshall Rogers as artist of the Batman newspaper comic strip and drew the strip until its cancellation the following year. During the 1990s Infantino also taught at the School of Visual Arts before retiring. Despite his retirement, Infantino made appearances at comic conventions in the early 21st century.

In 2004, he sued DC for rights to characters he alleged he had created while he was a freelancer for the company. These included several Flash characters including Wally West, Iris West, Captain Cold, Captain Boomerang, Mirror Master, and Gorilla Grodd, as well as Elongated Man and Batgirl. The lawsuit was dismissed in September of that same year.

One of his final stories for the company appeared in DC Comics Presents: Batman #1 (Sept. 2004), a tribute to Julius Schwartz.

Artist Nick Cardy commented on the popular but apocryphal anecdote, told by Julius Schwartz, about Infantino firing Cardy over not following a cover layout, only to rehire him moments later when Schwartz praised the errant cover art:

[A]t one of the conventions ... I said, 'You know, Carmine, Julie Schwartz wrote something in [his autobiography] that I don't remember at all and it doesn't sound like you at all'. And I told him the incident ... and he said, 'That's crazy. You know I always loved your work. Gee, you were one of the best artists in the business. The guy's crazy'. So I said, 'Okay, come on'. We went over to Julie Schwartz's table and we told him what our problem was. And Carmine and I said, 'We don't remember the incident'. So Julie said, 'Well, it's a good story, anyway'. [laughs] And that was it. He let it go at that. [laughs] He just made it up.

Infantino wrote or contributed to two books about his life and career: The Amazing World of Carmine Infantino (Vanguard Productions, ISBN 1-887591-12-5), and Carmine Infantino: Penciler, Publisher, Provocateur (Tomorrows Publishing, ISBN 1-60549-025-3).

== Death ==
Infantino died on April 4, 2013, at the age of 87 at his home in Manhattan.

== Legacy ==
In season three of The CW TV show The Flash, episode 22 is titled "Infantino Street".

In the 2023 Amazon Prime Video Christmas special, Merry Little Batman, Infantino appears in a cameo via archive audio.

== Awards ==
Infantino's awards include:

- 1958 National Cartoonists Society Award, Best Comic Book
- 1961 Alley Award, Best Single Issue: The Flash #123 (with Gardner Fox)
- 1961 Alley Award, Best Story: "Flash of Two Worlds", The Flash #123 (with Gardner Fox)
- 1961 Alley Award, Best Artist
- 1962 Alley Award, Best Book-Length Story: "The Planet that Came to a Standstill!", Mystery in Space #75 (with Gardner Fox)
- 1962 Alley Award, Best Pencil Artist
- 1963 Alley Award, Best Artist
- 1964 Alley Award, Best Short Story: "Doorway to the Unknown", The Flash #148 (with John Broome)
- 1964 Alley Award, Best Pencil Artist
- 1964 Alley Award, Best Comic Book Cover (Detective Comics #329 with Murphy Anderson)
- 1967 Alley Award, Best Full-Length Story: "Who's Been Lying in My Grave?", Strange Adventures #205 (with Arnold Drake)
- 1967 Alley Award, Best New Strip: "Deadman" in Strange Adventures (with Arnold Drake)
- 1969 special Alley Award for being the person "who exemplifies the spirit of innovation and inventiveness in the field of comic art"
- 1985: Named as one of the honorees by DC Comics in the company's 50th anniversary publication Fifty Who Made DC Great.
- 2000: Inkpot Award

== Bibliography ==
=== Archie Comics ===
- Blue Ribbon Comics #11 (1984)
- Comet #1–2 (1983)
- Steel Sterling #6 (1984)
- Tandy Computer Whiz Kids (News by Computer Foils Kidnappers Edition) #3 (1986)

=== Aviation Comics ===
- Contact Comics #4 (full art); #1 (inks over Gil Kane)

=== Comico ===
- Jonny Quest #13 (1987)

=== DC Comics ===
- Action Comics (Human Target) #419 (1972); (Superman, Nightwing, Green Lantern, Deadman) #642 (1989)
- Adventure Comics (Black Canary) #399 (1970); (Dial H for Hero) #479–485, 487–490 (1981–1982)
- Adventures of Bob Hope #103 (1967)
- Adventures of Ford Fairlane #3–4 (1990)
- Adventures of Rex, the Wonder Dog (Detective Chimp) #1–4, 6, 13, 15–46 (1952–1959)
- Alan Ladd #1 (1949)
- All American Men of War #51 (1957)
- All Star Western #60–70, 75, 93, 95–100, 102–113, 117–119 (1951–1961)
- All American Comics #95 (1948)
- All-American Men of War #8, 23 (1953–1955)
- All-American Western #105, 118–126 (1949–1952)
- All-Flash #31–32 (1947)
- All-Star Comics #37–38, 40–41, 54 (1947–1950)
- All-Star Squadron Annual #3 (1984)
- All-Star Western #58–59 (1951)
- Arak, Son of Thunder #48–49 (1985)
- Best of DC (Teen Titans) #18, (Legion of Super-Heroes) 24 (1981–1982)
- Boy Commandos #32–36 (1949)
- The Brave and the Bold #67, 72, 172, 183, 190, 194 (1966–1983)
- Comic Cavalcade #24–26, 28 (1947–1948)
- Danger Trail #1–5 (1950–1951)
- Danger Trail (miniseries) #1–4 (1993)
- Daring New Adventures of Supergirl #1–13 (1982–1983)
- DC Challenge #3 (1986)
- DC Comics Presents (Superman and the Flash) #73 (1984)
- DC Comics Presents: Batman (Julius Schwartz tribute issue) (2004)
- DC Special #3 (1969)
- Detective Comics (Boy Commandos): #144–148; (Batman): #327, 329, 331, 333, 335, 337, 339, 341, 343, 345, 347, 349, 351, 353, 355, 357, 359, 361, 363, 366–367, 369; (Elongated Man): #327–330, 332–342, 344–358, 362–363, 366–367, 500 (1964–1967, 1981)
- Falling in Love #9 (1957)
- The Flash #105–174 (1959–1967), #296–350 (1981–1985)
- Flash Comics #86–104 (1947–1949)
- Flash Special #1 (1990)
- G.I. Combat #53 (1957)
- Gang Busters #8, 11 (1949)
- Girls' Love Stories #3, 5, 15, 19, 126 (1949–1967)
- Girls' Romances #15, 20, 23 (1952–1953)
- Green Lantern, vol. 2, #53 (1967); (Adam Strange): #137, 145–147; (Green Lantern Corps) #151–153 (1981–1982)
- House of Mystery #110–111, 294, 296, 313 (1961–1983)
- House of Secrets #43 (1961)
- Impact Christmas Special (1992)
- Jimmy Wakely #1, 7–9, 11 (1949–1951)
- Justice League of America #200, 206 (1982)
- Legion of Super-Heroes (Dial "H" for Hero preview) #272; (backup story) #289 (1981–1982)
- Ms. Tree Quarterly #8 (King Faraday) (1992)
- Mystery in Space (Knights of the Galaxy) #1–8 (1951–1952); (Adam Strange) #53–84 (1959–1963); #117 (1981)
- My Greatest Adventure #64 (1962)
- Our Army at War #2, 22, 51 (1952–1956)
- Our Fighting Forces #16, 25, 28–29 (1956–1958)
- Phantom Stranger #1–3, 5–6 (1952–1953)
- Red Tornado, miniseries, #1–4 (1985)
- Romance Trail #5–6 (1950)
- Secret Hearts #8–9 (1952)
- Secret Origins (Adam Strange) #17–19; (Gorilla Grodd) #40; (Space Museum) #50; (The Flash) Annual #2 (1987–1990)
- Sensation Comics #87–89, 94–104, 107–112, 114–116 (1949–1953)
- Showcase (Flash) #4, 8, 13–14 (1956–1958)
- Spiral Zone #2 (1988)
- Star Spangled War Stories #14, 18, 20–21, 25, 33, 37, 46, 52, 61, 64 (1953–1957)
- Star Trek #30 (1986)
- Strange Adventures #4–5, 7, 9–15, 17–20, 22–24, 26, 31, 33–34, 36–37, 39, 45–50, 52–54, 56–59, 62, 64–70, 73–96, 98–100, 106–110, 112–113, 115, 117–118, 121–127, 129–137, 139, 141–151, 154, 157–159, 161–163, 180, 190; (Deadman) #205–209 (1951–1968)
- Super Powers #1–4 (1986)
- Supergirl, vol. 2, #1–20, 22–23 (1982–1984)
- Superman (Supergirl) #376; (Superman) #404 (1982–1985)
- Superman meets the Quik Bunny (1987)
- Super Powers, miniseries, #1–4 (1986)
- Teen Titans #27, 30 (1970)
- Tales of the Teen Titans #49 (1984)
- Tales of the Unexpected #64 (1961)
- V #1–3, 6–16 (1985–1986)
- Weird War Tales #116 (1971)
- Western Comics #43–85 (1954–1961)
- World's Finest Comics #39–41, 53–54, 64, 67–69; (Hawkman) #276, 282 (1949–1982)

=== Marvel Comics ===
- Adventures into Terror #13 (1952)
- Adventures into Weird Worlds #9, 13–14 (1952–1953)
- All True Crime Cases Comics] #31 (1948)
- Avengers #178, 197, 203, 244 (1978–1984)
- Captain America #245 (1980)
- Captain America Comics (Human Torch) #49, 51, 54, 56–62 (full art); 46, 53 (inks over Paul Reinman) (1945–1947)
- Crime Can't Win #6 (1951)
- Crimefighters #10 (1949)
- Daredevil #149–150, 152 (1977–1978)
- The Deep #1 (A Marvel Movie Special) (1977)
- Defenders #55–56 (1978)
- Destroyer #6 (1990)
- Ghost Rider #43–44 (1980)
- Howard the Duck #21, 28 (1978)
- Human Fly #2 (1977)
- Human Torch 20, 22, 25 (1945–1947)
- The Incredible Hulk #244 (1980)
- Inhumanoids #4 (1987)
- Iron Man #108–109, 122, 158 (1978–1982)
- John Carter Warlord of Mars #12–14 (1978)
- Justice #30 (1952)
- Kent Blake of the Secret Service #12 (1953)
- Love Tales #40 (1950)
- Lovers #48 (1953)
- Marvel Comics #76–78 (1946)
- Marvel Fanfare (Doctor Strange) #8; (Shanna, the She-Devil) #56 (1991)
- Marvel Mystery Comics #65, 68–72, 74, 79 (full art); #64 (inks over Al Gabriele) (1945–1946)
- Marvel Preview (Star-Lord) #14–15 (1978)
- Marvel Team-Up #92–93, 97, 105 (1980–1981)
- Men's Advnetures #21 (1953)
- Ms. Marvel #14, 19 (1978)
- My Own Romance #24, 27 (1952–1953)
- Mystery Tales #19 (1954)
- Mystic #12, 16 (1952–1953)
- Nova #15–20, 22–25 (1977–1979)
- Savage Sword of Conan #34 (1978)
- Spellbound #15 (1953)
- Spider-Woman #1–19 (1978–1979)
- Star Wars #11–15, 18–37, 45–48, Annual #2 (full art); #53–54 (with Walt Simonson) (1978–1982)
- Strange Tales #26 (1954)
- Sub-Mariner Comics #16, 19, 20–21 (1945–1946)
- Super-Villain Team-Up #16 (May 1979)
- Suspense #23–24 (1952)
- U.S.A. Comics #3 (inks over Frank Giacoia) (1942)
- What If (Nova) #15; (Ghost Rider, Spider-Woman, Captain Marvel) #17 (1979)

=== Warren Publishing ===
- Creepy #83–90, 93, 98 (1976–1978)
- Eerie #77, 79–84 (1976–1977)
- Vampirella (backup stories) #57–60 (1977)

Preceded by n/a	The Flash artist 1959–1967	Succeeded by Ross Andru
Preceded by Sheldon Moldoff	Detective Comics artist 1964–1967	Succeeded by Sheldon Moldoff
Preceded by Sal Buscema	Nova artist 1977–1979	Succeeded by n/a
Preceded by n/a	Spider-Woman artist 1978–1979	Succeeded by Frank Springer
Preceded by Howard Chaykin	Star Wars artist 1978–1981	Succeeded by Walt Simonson
Preceded by Don Heck	The Flash artist 1981–1985	Succeeded by n/a
