= The Flash =

Several superheroes in the DC Comics universe

- Characters who have associated with the name "The Flash": Barry Allen at the center, and counterclockwise from upper left are Iris West II, Bart Allen, Jesse Chambers, Wally West, Jay Garrick, and Max Mercury. Art by Ethan Van Sciver.
- Publisher: DC Comics
- First appearance: Flash Comics #1 (January 1940)
- Created by: Gardner Fox; Harry Lampert
- Characters: Jay Garrick; Barry Allen; Wally West; Bart Allen

The Flash is the name of several superheroes appearing in American comic books published by DC Comics. Created by writer Gardner Fox and artist Harry Lampert, the original Flash first appeared in Flash Comics #1 (cover-dated January 1940, released November 1939). Nicknamed "the Scarlet Speedster", all incarnations of the Flash possess "superspeed", which includes the ability to run, move, and think extremely fast, use superhuman reflexes, and seemingly violate certain laws of physics.

Thus far, at least four different characters –each of whom somehow gained the power of "the Speed Force"– have assumed the mantle of the Flash in DC's history: college athlete Jay Garrick (1940–1951, 1961–2011, 2017–present), forensic scientist Barry Allen (1956–1985, 2008–present), Barry's nephew Wally West (1986–2011, 2016–present), and Barry's grandson Bart Allen (2006–2007). Each incarnation of the Flash has been a key member of at least one of DC's premier teams: the Justice Society of America, the Justice League, and the Teen Titans.

The Flash is one of DC Comics' most popular characters and has been integral to the publisher's many reality-changing "crisis" storylines over the years. The original meeting of the Golden Age Flash Jay Garrick and Silver Age Flash Barry Allen in "Flash of Two Worlds" (1961) introduced the Multiverse storytelling concept to DC readers, which would become the basis for many DC stories in the future.

Like his Justice League colleagues Wonder Woman, Superman and Batman, the Flash has a distinctive cast of adversaries, including Gorilla Grodd, the various Rogues (unique among DC supervillains for their code of honor), and the various psychotic "speedsters" who go by the names Reverse-Flash or Zoom. Other supporting characters in Flash stories include Barry's wife, Iris West; Wally's wife, Linda Park; Bart's girlfriend, Valerie Perez; friendly fellow speedster, Max Mercury; and Central City police department members, David Singh and Patty Spivot.

A staple of the comic book DC Universe, the Flash has been adapted to numerous DC films, video games, animated series, and live-action television shows. In live-action, Barry Allen has been portrayed by Rod Haase in the 1979 television special Legends of the Superheroes, John Wesley Shipp in the 1990 The Flash series and Grant Gustin in the 2014 The Flash series, and Ezra Miller in the DC Extended Universe series of films, beginning with Batman v Superman: Dawn of Justice (2016). Shipp also portrays a version of Jay Garrick in the 2014 The Flash series. The various incarnations of the Flash are also features in animated series such as Superman: The Animated Series, Justice League, Batman: The Brave and the Bold and Young Justice, and the DC Universe Animated Original Movies series.

== Publication history ==
=== Golden Age ===
The Flash first appeared in the Golden Age Flash Comics #1 (January 1940), from All-American Publications, one of three companies that would eventually merge to form DC Comics. Created by writer Gardner Fox and artist Harry Lampert, this Flash was Jay Garrick, a college student who gained his speed through the inhalation of hard water vapors. When re-introduced in the 1960s Garrick's origin was modified slightly, gaining his powers through exposure to heavy water.

Jay Garrick was a popular character in the 1940s, supporting both Flash Comics and All-Flash Quarterly (later published bi-monthly as simply All-Flash); co-starring in Comic Cavalcade; and being a charter member of the Justice Society of America, the first superhero team, whose adventures ran in All Star Comics. With superheroes' post-war decline in popularity, Flash Comics was canceled with issue #104 (1949) which featured an evil version of the Flash called the Rival. The Justice Society's final Golden Age story ran in All Star Comics #57 (1951; the title itself continued as All Star Western).

=== Silver Age ===
In 1956, DC Comics successfully revived superheroes, ushering in what became known as the Silver Age of comic books. Rather than bringing back the same Golden Age heroes, DC rethought them as new characters for the modern age. The Flash was the first revival, in the tryout comic book Showcase #4 (October 1956).

This new Flash was Barry Allen, a police scientist who gained super-speed when bathed by chemicals after a shelf of them was struck by lightning. He adopted the name The Scarlet Speedster after reading a comic book featuring the Golden Age Flash. After several more appearances in Showcase, Allen's character was given his own title, The Flash, the first issue of which was #105 (resuming where Flash Comics had left off). Barry Allen and the new Flash were created by writers Robert Kanigher and John Broome and cartoonist Carmine Infantino.

The Silver Age Flash proved popular enough that several other Golden Age heroes were revived in new incarnations (see: Green Lantern). A new superhero team, the Justice League of America, was also created, with the Flash as a main, charter member.

Barry Allen's title also introduced a much-imitated plot device into superhero comics when it was revealed that Garrick and Allen existed on fictional parallel worlds. Their powers allowed them to cross the dimensional boundary between worlds, and the men became good friends. Flash of Two Worlds (The Flash #123) was the first crossover in which a Golden Age character met a Silver Age character. Soon, there were crossovers between the entire Justice League and the Justice Society; their respective teams began an annual get-together which endured from the early 1960s until the mid-1980s.

Allen's adventures continued in his own title until the event of Crisis on Infinite Earths. The Flash ended as a series with issue #350. Allen's life had become considerably confused in the early 1980s, and DC elected to end his adventures and pass the mantle on to another character. Allen died heroically in Crisis on Infinite Earths #8 (1985). Thanks to his ability to travel through time, he would continue to appear occasionally in the years to come.

=== Modern Age ===
The third Flash was Wally West, introduced in The Flash #110 (December 1959) as Kid Flash. West, Allen's nephew by marriage, gained the Flash's powers through an accident identical to Allen's. Adopting the identity of Kid Flash, he maintained membership in the Teen Titans for years. Following Allen's death, West adopted the Flash identity in Crisis on Infinite Earths #12 and was given his own series, beginning with The Flash (vol. 2) #1 in 1987. Many issues began with the catchphrase: "My name is Wally West. I'm the fastest man alive."

Due to the Infinite Crisis miniseries and the "One Year Later" jump in time in the DC Universe, DC canceled The Flash (vol. 2) in January 2006 at #230. A new series, The Flash: The Fastest Man Alive, began on June 21, 2006. The initial story arc of this series, written by Danny Bilson and Paul De Meo with art by Ken Lashley, focused on Bart Allen's acceptance of the role of the Flash.

Flash: Fastest Man Alive was canceled with issue #13. In its place The Flash (vol. 2) was revived with issue #231, with Mark Waid as the initial writer. Waid also wrote All-Flash #1, which acted as the bridge between the two series. DC had solicited The Flash: The Fastest Man Alive through issue #15. All Flash #1 replaced issue #14 and The Flash (vol. 2) #231 replaced issue #15 in title and interior creative team only. The covers and cover artists were as solicited by DC, and the information text released was devoid of any plot information.

In 2009, Barry Allen made a full-fledged return to the DCU-proper in The Flash: Rebirth, a six-issue miniseries by Geoff Johns and Ethan Van Sciver.

== Fictional character biographies ==
While several other individuals have used the name Flash, these have either on parallel worlds or in the future. Jay Garrick, Barry Allen, and Wally West are the best-known exemplars of the identity. The signature wingdings are never absent.

=== Jay Garrick ===
Jay Garrick as the original Flash, as he appeared on a splash page of All-Flash Quarterly #1 (Summer 1941). Art by E.E. Hibbard.

Jay Garrick was a college student in 1938 who accidentally inhaled heavy water vapors after taking a smoke break inside his laboratory where he had been working. As a result, he found that he could run at superhuman speed and had similarly fast reflexes. After a brief career as a college football star, he donned a red shirt with a lightning bolt and a stylized metal helmet with wings (based on images of the Greek deity Hermes), and began to fight crime as the Flash. His first case involved battling the "Faultless Four", a group of blackmailers. Garrick kept his identity secret for years without a mask by continually vibrating his body while in public so that any photograph of his face would be blurred. Although originally from Earth-Two, he was incorporated into the history of New Earth following the Crisis on Infinite Earths and is still active as the Flash operating out of Keystone City. He is a member of the Justice Society.

=== Barry Allen ===
Barry Allen, as depicted during his debut in Showcase #4 (September 1956). Art by Carmine Infantino and Joe Kubert.

Barry Allen is an assistant scientist from the Criminal and Forensic Science Division of Central City Police Department. Barry had a reputation for being very slow, deliberate, and frequently late, which frustrated his fiancée, Iris West. One night, as he was preparing to leave work, a freak lightning bolt struck a nearby shelf in his lab and doused him with a cocktail of unnamed chemicals. As a result, Barry found that he could run extremely fast and had matching reflexes. He donned a set of red tights sporting a lightning bolt (reminiscent of the original Fawcett Comics Captain Marvel), dubbed himself the Flash (after his childhood hero, Jay Garrick), and became a crimefighter active in Central City. In his civilian identity, he stores the costume compressed in a special ring via the use of a special gas that could compress cloth fibers to a small fraction of their normal size.

Barry sacrificed himself to save the universe in the 1985 maxi-series Crisis on Infinite Earths and remained dead for over twenty years after that story's publication. With the 2008 series Final Crisis, Barry returned to the DC Universe and returned to full prominence as the Flash in the 2009 series The Flash: Rebirth, which was soon after followed by a new volume of The Flash ongoing series, where Barry's adventures as the Scarlet Speedster were published until 2020. Wally returned as the primary Flash after 2021, but Barry remains a supporting character to him and the larger DC Universe and still operates as the Flash as of 2024.

=== Wally West ===
Wally West as The Flash, on the cover of The Flash (vol. 2) #207 (April 2004). Art by Michael Turner.

Wallace Rudolph "Wally" West is the nephew of both Iris West and Barry Allen, by marriage, and was introduced in The Flash #110 (1959). When West was about ten years old, he was visiting his uncle's police laboratory, and the freak accident that gave Allen his powers repeated itself, bathing West in electrically charged chemicals. Now possessing the same powers as his uncle, West donned a copy of his uncle's outfit and became the young, crime fighter, Kid Flash. After the events of Crisis on Infinite Earths where Barry Allen was killed, Wally took over as the fastest man alive. Following the events of Infinite Crisis, Wally, his wife Linda, and their twins left Earth for an unknown dimension.

Wally, his wife, and their twins were pulled back from the Speed Force by the Legion of Super-Heroes at the conclusion of The Lightning Saga. This set the stage for Wally West's return as the Flash after the events of The Flash: Fastest Man Alive #13 (see Bart Allen), in All Flash #1, and with The Flash (vol. 2) series, which resumed with issue #231 in August 2007. It subsequently ends with issue #247, and West, along with all the other Flash characters, play a large role in 2009's The Flash: Rebirth. After the New 52 reboot, Wally was removed from DC continuity but returned during DC Rebirth using a new red and silver costume, to a world that had forgotten his existence due to a combination of Barry and Dr. Manhattan meddling with reality during Flashpoint and the villain Abra Kadabra wiping the memory of Wally's existence. After Manhattan undid the meddling he'd caused to reality, Wally was restored to the timeline and his family eventually returned as well. Barry returned the mantle of the primary Flash to Wally after Barry elected to join the multiverse-travelling team Justice Incarnate. Wally's return as the main character of The Flash series began in The Flash #771 (2021) and is still the main Flash as of 2024.

=== Bart Allen ===
Bart Allen as the Flash on the cover of The Flash: The Fastest Man Alive #1 (June 2006). Art by Ken Lashley, Andy Kubert, Dave Stewart, and Joe Kubert

Bartholomew Henry "Bart" Allen II is the grandson of Barry Allen and his wife Iris. Bart suffered from accelerated aging and, as a result, was raised in a virtual reality machine until Iris took him back in time to get help from the then-current Flash, Wally West. With Wally's help, Bart's aging slowed, and he took the name Impulse. After Jericho, possessing Deathstroke's body, shoots Bart in the knee, he changes both his attitude and his costume, taking the mantle of Kid Flash. During the events of Infinite Crisis, the Speed Force vanished, taking with it all the speedsters save Jay Garrick. Bart returned, four years older, and claimed to have lost his powers. However, the Speed Force had not disappeared completely, but had been absorbed into Bart's body; essentially, he now contained all of the Speed Force.

Bart's costume as the Flash was a clone of his grandfather's, similarly stylized to Wally West's. Not long after taking the mantle of the Flash, Bart was killed by the Rogues in the thirteenth (and final) issue of The Flash: The Fastest Man Alive. However, he was later resurrected in the 31st century in Final Crisis: Legion of 3 Worlds #3 by Brainiac 5 to combat Superboy-Prime and the Legion of Super-Villains. Bart returned to the past and played a large role in The Flash: Rebirth.

=== Others ===
==== Avery Ho ====
Avery Ho gained her powers as a teenager living in Central City in a "Speed Force Storm" that granted her a connection to the Speed Force. Avery was trained to use her powers by Barry, Meena Dhawan/Negative Flash, and August Heart/Godspeed, though when it was discovered Heart was stealing the speed of Speed Force-connected Central City residents, Barry and Ace West/Kid Flash set out to remove the connected residents' connection to the Speed Force, but were attacked by Godspeed before they could remove Avery's. Although they defeated Godspeed, Avery retained her connection to the Speed Force and her powers. She has gone on to become a member of The Justice League of China (a team she joined to retain her Flash moniker and her Chinese-American heritage), the multi-verse team the Justice Incarnate, and the Flash Family, becoming the love interest of Ace West, the duo serving as the main characters of the ongoing series Speed Force.

==== Jesse Chambers ====
Daughter of the speedster Johnny Quick, Jesse Chambers becomes a speeding superhero like her father. She later meets Wally West, the Flash, who asks her to be his replacement if something were to happen to him (as part of an elaborate plan on his part, trying to force Bart Allen to take his role in the legacy of the Flash more seriously). She briefly assumes the mantle of the Flash, after Wally enters the Speed Force.

In addition to her speed, Chambers also inherited her mother's superhuman strength. Following her mother's legacy, she has also used the superhero identity of Liberty Belle and served as a member of the Justice Society of America.

==== Jess Chambers ====
Jess Chambers was originally known as Kid Quick, the non-binary sidekick to Earth-11's Jesse Quick, and a member of the team Teen Justice. In the Future State event, Chambers would permanently relocate to Earth-0, taking on the mantle of the Flash and joining the Justice League.

==== Judy Garrick ====
Judy Garrick is the daughter of the original Flash, Jay Garrick, first known as the Boom. As a teenager, she was abducted from the timestream by the Childminder, a Mother Goose-like being who took many Golden Age sidekicks to be sold. Judy and the rest of the Lost Children were freed by Stargirl and Red Arrow, re-entering the timestream in the present day and reuniting with her father. Years later, Judy would take on the mantle of the Flash and join the Justice Society of America.

==== John Fox ====
John Fox was a historian for the National Academy of Science in Central City in the 27th Century. He was sent back in time to get the help of one or more of the three Flashes (Garrick, Allen, West), in order to defeat the radioactive villain Mota back in Fox's own time period. Each Flash had individually fought Mota over the course of several years in the 20th century. Fox's mission was a failure, but during his return trip, the tachyon radiation that sent him through the time stream gave him superhuman speed. He defeated Mota as a new iteration of the Flash and operated as his century's Flash for a time. Shortly after, he moved to the 853rd century and joined "Justice Legion A" (also known as Justice Legion Alpha) as seen in the DC One Million series of books. The name "John Fox" is combined from the names of seminal comic book writers John Broome, who co-created the Barry Allen and Wally West Flashes, and Gardner Fox, who co-created the Jay Garrick Flash.

==== Unnamed Allen of the 23rd century ====
The father of Sela Allen, his wife and daughter were captured by Cobalt Blue. He is forced to watch his wife die and his daughter become crippled. As he and Max Mercury kill Cobalt Blue, a child takes Cobalt Blue's power gem and kills Allen. This Flash is one of the two destined Flashes to be killed by Cobalt Blue.

==== Sela Allen ====
Sela Allen as the Flash of the 23rd century

Sela Allen is an ordinary human in the 23rd century until Cobalt Blue steals electrical impulses away from her, causing her to become as slow to the world as the world is to the Flash. Hoping to restore her, her father takes her into the Speed Force. When her father is killed, she appears as a living manifestation of the Speed Force, able to lend speed to various people and objects, but unable to physically interact with the world.

==== Blaine Allen ====
Blaine Allen and his son live on the colony world of Petrus in the 28th century. In an attempt to end the Allen blood line, Cobalt Blue injects Allen's son Jace with a virus. Lacking super speed, Jace was unable to shake off the virus. In despair, Blaine takes his son to the Speed Force in the hopes that it would accept him. It takes Blaine instead and grants superspeed to Jace so that he can shake off the sickness.

==== Jace Allen ====
Jace Allen gains superspeed when his father brings him into the Speed Force to attempt to cure him of a virus injected into his body by Cobalt Blue in an attempt to end the Allen bloodline. In memory of his father, Jace assumes the mantle of the Flash and continues the feud against Cobalt Blue.

==== Kryiad ====
Blaine Allen as the Flash of the 28th century

After an alien creature invades Earth, a history buff named Kriyad travels back in time from the 98th century to acquire a Green Lantern power ring (The Flash #309, May 1982). He fails, so he tries to capture the Flash's speed instead. After being beaten by Barry Allen, he travels back further in time and uses the chemicals from the clothes Barry Allen was wearing when he gained his powers to give himself super speed. Returning to his own time, Kryiad sacrifices himself to defeat the alien creature.

==== Bizarro Flash ====
Bizarro-Flash was created when Bizarro cloned Flash. He had a costume the reverse colors of Flash's, however he had a mallet symbol because Flash was holding one when he was cloned. The modern version of Bizarro Flash has the symbol of a thunderbolt-shaped mustard stain. He has the powers of the Flash but he is completely intangible.

== Powers and abilities ==
All incarnations of the Flash can move, think, and react at light speeds as well as having superhuman endurance that allows them to run incredible distances. Some, notably later versions, can vibrate so fast that they can pass through walls in a process called quantum tunneling, travel through time and can also lend and borrow speed. Speedsters can also heal more rapidly than an average human. In addition, most incarnations have an invisible aura around their respective bodies that protects them from air friction and the kinetic effects of their powers.

On several occasions, the Flash has raced against Superman, either to determine who is faster or as part of a mutual effort to thwart some type of threat; these races, however, often result in ties because of outside circumstances. Writer Jim Shooter and artist Curt Swan crafted the story "Superman's Race with the Flash!" in Superman #199 (August 1967), which featured the first race between the Flash and Superman. Writer E. Nelson Bridwell and artist Ross Andru produced "The Race to the End of the Universe", a follow-up story four months later in The Flash #175 (December 1967). However, after the DC Universe revision after Crisis on Infinite Earths, the Flash does successfully beat Superman in a race in The Adventures of Superman #463, with the explanation that Superman is not accustomed to running at high speed for extended periods of time since flying is more versatile and less strenuous, which means the far more practiced Flash has the advantage. After Final Crisis in Flash: Rebirth #3, the Flash is shown as being significantly faster than Superman, able to outrun him as Superman struggles to keep up with him. He reveals that all the close races between them before had been "for charity". In the "Smallville" episode "Run," the Flash (Bart Allen) effortlessly matches pre-Superman Clark Kent's top speed while running backward; and when running seriously, he instantly outruns Clark and disappears from his view beyond the horizon.

While various incarnations of the Flash have proven their ability to run at light speed, the ability to steal speed from other objects allows respective Flashes to even significantly surpass this velocity. In Flash: The Human Race, Wally is shown absorbing kinetic energy, to an extent enabling him to move faster than teleportation and run from the end of the universe back to earth in less than a Planck instant.

Speedsters may at times use the ability to speed-read at incredible rates and in doing so, process vast amounts of information. Whatever knowledge they acquire in this manner is usually temporary. Their ability to think fast also allows them some immunity to telepathy, as their thoughts operate at a rate too rapid for telepaths such as Martian Manhunter or Gorilla Grodd to read or influence their minds.

Flashes and other super-speedsters also have the ability to speak to one another at a highly accelerated rate. This is often done to have private conversations in front of non-fast people (as when Flash speaks to Superman about his ability to serve both the Titans and the JLA in The Titans #2). Speed-talking is also sometimes used for comedic effect where Flash becomes so excited that he begins talking faster and faster until his words become a jumble of noise. He also has the ability to change the vibration of his vocal cords making it so he can change how his voice sounds to others.

While not having the physical strength of many of his comrades and enemies, Flash has shown to be able to use his speed to exert incredible momentum into physical attacks.

The Flash has also claimed that he can process thoughts in less than an attosecond. At times he is able to throw lightning created by his super speed and make speed vortices.

Some flashes also have the ability to create speed avatars (i.e. duplicates) and these avatars have sometimes been sent to different timelines to complete a particular mission. (Barry Allen exhibits this ability in the live action series "The Flash").

He can also be seen negating the effects of the anti-life equation, when he freed Iris-West from its control (probably due to his connection with the Speed Force).

It is said that Wally West has reached the velocity of 23,759,449,000,000,000,000,000,000,000,000,000,000,000,000 (about 24 tredecillion) × c (the speed of light), and he could only do this with the help of every human being on earth moving so the Speed Force was joined through everyone. With that speed, he was able to run not only from planet to planet but also to different galaxies and universes at what would be considered a blink of an eye.

== Different Flashes ==
Tanaka Rei from Legends of the DC Universe: Crisis on Infinite Earths. Art by Paul Ryan and Bob McLeod.

An unidentified alternate universe version of Flash appears in 52. This version resembles Jay Garrick and is from an alternate universe similar to Earth-Two.

A variant of the Flash—a superfast college student named Mary Maxwell—was seen in the Elseworld book Just Imagine Stan Lee Creating The Flash.

=== Tanaka Rei ===
The Flash of Earth-D, Rei was a Japanese man who idolized Barry Allen, whose stories only existed in comic books on this world. Rei was inspired by Allen to become the Flash, much like Allen was inspired to become the Flash by his idol, Jay Garrick. Allen and Rei meet during the "Crisis on Infinite Earths" when Barry is coming back from the 30th century and arrives in the wrong universe. As Earth-D was under attack by the shadow demons, Barry called on the Justice League and Tanaka called on the Justice Alliance, his world's version of the Justice League. They built a cosmic treadmill and were able to evacuate much of Earth-D's population. The Justice League left, but 39 seconds later, Earth-D perished.

Rei made his only appearance in Legends of the DC Universe: Crisis on Infinite Earths (February 1999). The story was written by Marv Wolfman, with art by Paul Ryan (pencils) and Bob McLeod (ink).

=== Lia Nelson ===
Lia Nelson, the Tangent reality's Flash

The young, female Flash of the Tangent Comics Universe is not a speedster, but instead "the first child born in space" and a being made up of and able to control light. As a side effect, she can move at the speed of light, which makes her faster than most of the other Post-Crisis Flashes, with only Wally West having survived a light-speed run without becoming trapped in the Speed Force. Flash reappeared in Justice League of America (vol. 2) #16, summoned out of the paper "green lantern" of her universe—an artifact that survived the Crisis that erased the Tangent Universe from existence. Lia Nelson also appeared in Countdown: Arena, battling two versions of the Flash from other Earths within the multiverse. In the 52-Earth Multiverse, the Tangent universe is designated Earth-9.

=== Superman & Batman: Generations 2 ===
In Superman & Batman: Generations 2, three different Flashes appear: Wally West as Kid Flash in 1964, Wally's cousin Carrie as Kid Flash in 1986, and Jay West, the son of Wally and his wife Magda as the fifth Flash in 2008. Barry Allen makes a cameo appearance out of costume in 1964.

=== Green Lightning ===
Ali Rayner-West, aka Green Lightning, is a descendant of both Kyle Rayner and Wally West. She has both a power ring and superspeed, as seen in Green Lantern: Circle of Fire. Ali is later revealed to be a living construct created by Kyle's subconscious and is later absorbed back into his mind.

=== Ame-Comi ===
A teenage version of Jesse Chambers appears as the Flash of the Ame-Comi universe. As with most of the other characters of that Earth, she sports an Anime-inspired costume.

=== The Crash ===
The 1980s series Captain Carrot and His Amazing Zoo Crew! presented the parallel Earth of "Earth-C-Minus", a world populated by talking animal superheroes that paralleled the mainstream DC Universe. Earth-C-Minus was the home of the Crash, a turtle with super-speed powers similar to those of Barry Allen's, and a member of his world's superhero team, the Just'a Lotta Animals. The Crash as a youth had read comics about Earth-C's Terrific Whatzit, similar to how Barry Allen enjoyed comics about Earth-Two's Jay Garrick.

=== Danica Williams ===
Danica Williams, the Flash Beyond

An African-American teenager of Earth 12 named Danica Williams appears as the Flash in the Justice League Beyond series, acting as Wally West's successor during the 2040s (following the events of Batman Beyond). She is employed at the Flash Museum in Central City, and like Barry Allen, is chronically late. She later enters into a relationship with Billy Batson, who is the secret identity of the superhero, Captain Marvel.

=== Sonic the Hedgehog ===
In DC X Sonic the Hedgehog, a comic crossover between DC and Sega's Sonic the Hedgehog franchise, the Justice League transport Sonic and his friends to their world to save them as they battle Darkseid. While trying to figure out a way back home, Sonic and his friends decide to fill in the League's roles as protectors of their world. Sonic dons the mantle of the Flash and battles the hero's rogues gallery in Central City including Reverse-Flash, from whom he retrieves the cyan Chaos Emerald.

== Writers ==
The following writers have been involved in the ongoing The Flash and Flash Comics series:

Writer	Issues written	Years
Gardner Fox	Flash Comics #1–80, The Flash #117, 123, 129, 137–138, 140, 143–146, 149–152, 154, 157–159, 162, 164, 166–167, 170–171, 177	1940–1947, 1960–1968
Robert Kanigher	Flash Comics #84–91, 93, 96–97, 103–104, The Flash #160–161, 192, 195, 197–204, 206, 208, 214	1947–1949, 1966, 1969–1972
John Broome	Flash Comics #91–104, The Flash #105–128, 130–142, 146–149, 152–156, 158–161, 163–166, 168–169, 172–174, 176, 178, 182, 187–194,	1948–1949, 1959–1970
E. Nelson Bridwell	#175	1967
Cary Bates	#179, 209–212, 216, 218–305, 307–312, 314–350	1968, 1971–1985
Frank Robbins	#180–181, 183–185	1968–1969
Mike Friedrich	#186, 195, 197–198, 207	1969–1971
Steve Skeates	#202, 204, 207, 209–211, 216	1970–1972
Len Wein	#208, 212, 215, 217	1971–1973
Dennis O'Neil	#217–224, 226–228, 230–231, 233–234, 237–238, 240–243, 245–246	1972–1977
Gerry Conway	#289–299, 301–304 (Firestorm backup stories)	1980–1981
Dan Mishkin	#306	1982
Gary Cohn	#306	1982
Martin Pasko	#306–313 (Doctor Fate backup stories)	1982
Steve Gerber	#310–313 (Doctor Fate backup stories)	1982
Mike W. Barr	#313	1982
Mike Baron	Vol. 2 #1–14, Annual Vol. 2 #1	1986–1987
William Messner-Loebs	Vol. 2 #15–28, 30–61, 80-Page Giant #2, Annual Vol 2 #2–3, Special #1	1987–1992
Len Strazewski	Vol. 2 #29, Special #1	1989
Mark Waid	Vol. 2 #0, 62–129, 142–159, 231–236, 1000000, 80-Page Giant #1, Annual Vol. 2 #4–6, 8, Special #1, Flash Plus Nightwing #1, The Flash Secret Files and Origins #1–2, The Flash TV Special #1, The Flash/Green Lantern: Faster Friends #1, The Flash & Green Lantern: The Brave and the Bold #1–6, Vol. 6 #26–30	1992–1997, 1998–2000, 2007–2008, 2025–2026
Mark Wheatley and Allan Gross	Annual Vol. 2 #7	1994
Mark Millar	Vol. 2 #130–141, 80-Page Giant #1	1997–1998
Grant Morrison	Vol. 2 #130–138	1997–1998
Brian Augustyn	Vol. 2 #142–143, 148–149, 160, 162, 80-Page Giant #1–2 Annual Vol. 2 #10–12, Flash Plus Nightwing #1, The Flash Secret Files and Origins #1–2	1996–2000
Pat McGreal	Vol. 2 #161, 163	2000
Chuck Dixon	Annual Vol. 2 #13	2000
Geoff Johns	Vol. 2 #1/2, 164–225, The Flash Secret Files and Origins #3 Iron Heights, The Flash: Our Worlds at War #1, Vol. 3 #1–12, The Flash Secret Files and Origins 2010, The Flash Rebirth #1–6	2000–2005, 2009–2011
Stuart Immonen	Vol. 2 #226	2005
Joey Cavalieri	#330–331, Vol. 2 #227–230	1984, 2005–2006
John Rogers	Vol. 2 #233–236	2007–2008
Keith Champagne	Vol. 2 #237	2008
Tom Peyer	Vol. 2 #238–243, The Flash 80-Page Giant #2, Annual Vol. 2 #8, The Flash Secret Files and Origins #2	1995, 1999, 2008–2009
Alan Burnett	Vol. 2 #244–247	2009
Francis Manapul	Vol. 4 #1–25, 0, 23.2: Reverse-Flash #1, Annual Vol. 4 #1	2011–2013
Christos Gage	Vol. 4 #26	2013
Brian Buccellato	Vol. 4 #1–25, 27–29, 0, 23.1: Grodd #1, 23.2: Reverse-Flash #1, 23.3: The Rogues #1, Annual Vol. 4 #1–2	2011–2014
Robert Venditti	Vol. 4 #30–49, Futures End #1, Annual Vol. 4 #3	2014–2016
Van Jensen	Vol. 4 #30–52, Futures End #1, Annual Vol. 4 #3–4	2014–2016
Josh Williamson	Vol. 5 Rebirth #1, #1–88, Vol. 1 (continued) #750-762, Annual Vol. 5 #1–3	2016–2020
Kevin Shinick	Vol. 1 #763–767	2020
Jeremy Adams	Vol 1. #768–800, 2021 Annual, 2022 Annual	2021–2023
Simon Spurrier	Vol 6. #1–25, 2024 Annual	2023–2025
Christopher Cantwell	Vol. 6 #26–30	2025–2026
Ryan North	Vol. 6 #31–	2026–present

== Awards ==
The comics and characters have been nominated for and won several awards over the years, including:

- 1961 Alley Award for Best Cover (The Flash (vol. 1) #123)
- 1961 Alley Award for Best Single Comic (The Flash (vol. 1) #123 by Gardner Fox and Carmine Infantino)
- 1963 Alley Award for Cross-Over of DC Heroes for The Brave and the Bold (with Hawkman)
- 1964 Alley Award for Best Short Story ("Doorway to the Unknown" in The Flash (vol. 1) #148 by John Broome and Carmine Infantino)
- 2001 Eisner Award for Best Cover Artist (The Flash, by Brian Bolland)
- 2008 Salou Award for Best Super Hero (Flash – Danny Holmes by BUAFC)

== In other media ==
Throughout his 70-year history, the Flash has appeared in numerous media. The Flash has been included in multiple animated features, such as Super Friends and Justice League, as well as his own live action television series and some guest star appearances on Smallville (as the Bart Allen/Impulse version). There are numerous videos that feature the character.

== Rogues ==
Like Batman, Superman, and Green Lantern, the Flash has a reputation for having fought a distinctive and memorable rogues gallery of supervillains. In the Flash's case, some of these villains have adopted the term "Flash's Rogues Gallery" as an official title, and insist on being called "Rogues" rather than "supervillains" or similar names. At times, various combinations of the Rogues have banded together to commit crimes or take revenge on the Flash, usually under the leadership of Captain Cold.

The Rogues are known for their communal style relationship, socializing together and operating under a strict moral code, sometimes brutally enforced by Captain Cold. Such "rules" include "no drugs" and, except in very dire situations or on unique occasions, "no killing".
