= Barry Allen =

DC Comics superhero

- Barry Allen as depicted in a pin-up art of The Flash Secret Files & Origins #3 (November 2001). Art by Carmine Infantino.

Publication information
- Publisher: DC Comics
- First appearance: Showcase #4 (October 1956)
- Created by: Robert Kanigher; Carmine Infantino

In-story information
- Full name: Bartholomew Henry "Barry" Allen
- Species: Metahuman
- Place of origin: Central City
- Team affiliations: Justice League; Flash Family
- Partnerships: Kid Flash (various); Other Flashes (various); Green Arrow; Green Lantern (Hal Jordan); Green Lantern (Jessica Cruz)
- Notable aliases: The Flash; Fastest Man Alive; Scarlet Speedster
- Abilities: Genius-level intellect; Advanced hand-to-hand combatant; Brilliant forensic scientist; Speed Force grants: See list: Immense superhuman speed, agility, and reflexes via speed force aura conduit; Speed Force absorption, negation, and empathy; Electrokinesis; Air and temperature manipulation; Intangibility and invisibility via molecular vibration at high velocity; Time travel and dimensional travel via superluminal speed; Energy transformation; Lightning-projection; Accelerated healing; Enhanced perceptions and senses; Time manipulation; Sonic shockwave projection; Hyper-accelerated metabolism

Bartholomew Henry "Barry" Allen is a superhero appearing in American comic books published by DC Comics. He is the second character known as the Flash, following Jay Garrick. The character first appeared in Showcase #4 (October 1956), created by writer Robert Kanigher and penciler Carmine Infantino. A forensic chemist, Barry accidentally gains superpowers following a lightning strike in his laboratory. Like other heroes who go by the Flash, Barry is a "speedster", with powers that derive mainly from his superhuman speed. He wears a distinct red and gold costume treated to resist friction and wind, traditionally storing the costume compressed inside a ring.

Created as a reimagining of the popular 1940s superhero The Flash (Jay Garrick), Barry Allen's popularity helped to bring about the Silver Age of Comic Books and contributed to a large growth in DC Comics' stable of science fiction comics and characters. During popular early volumes as the Flash, Barry established his own Rogues Gallery of colorful villains and sci-fi concepts like Gorilla City. Through crossovers with popular characters like Superman, Wonder Woman, and Batman, Barry Allen's Flash also helped establish DC's flagship Justice League title, whose success would define its publishing strategy for decades to come.

Barry Allen's classic stories also introduced the concept of the Multiverse to DC Comics, which has played a large part in DC's many continuity reboots over the years. As a result, the Flash has traditionally always had a significant role in DC's major company-wide crossover stories, and in the crossover Crisis on Infinite Earths #8 (November 1985), Barry Allen died saving the Multiverse and would not appear again for 23 years. His return to regular comics is foreshadowed during Grant Morrison's crossover story Final Crisis #2 (June 2008), preceding his full return in Geoff Johns' accompanying The Flash: Rebirth (June 2009) limited series. He has since played a pivotal role in the crossover stories like Blackest Night (2009), Flashpoint (2011), Convergence (2015), DC Rebirth (2016), Doomsday Clock (2017–2019), Infinite Frontier (2021), and Absolute Power (2024).

Barry Allen is an established pop culture icon and has been featured in several media, first appearing in animated form in the 1967 The Superman/Aquaman Hour of Adventure and then in the related Super Friends program. Since then he has appeared in several DC Universe Animated Original Movies. Actor John Wesley Shipp portrayed the character in the live-action 1990s television show The Flash and the Arrowverse.

Grant Gustin portrayed the character in the Arrowverse, while Ezra Miller portrayed him in the DC Extended Universe films and related media.

== Publication history ==
While the fictional "in world" history of the character known as "The Flash" has been written and rewritten many times as DC Comics rebooted their fictional worlds again and again, the publication history of the character has followed a different path, not (quite) so prone to rewriting.

The Flash, Barry Allen (the name Bartholomew was not used until much later), first appeared in print in Showcase #4 (October 1956). The creative team on Showcase #4 consisted of Julie Schwartz (editor), Robert Kanigher (writer), Carmine Infantino (penciler, i.e., illustrator), and Joe Kubert (inker, i.e., assistant illustrator). Robert Kanigher is on record as saying he still considers Gardner Fox as "the creator of The Flash", and his creation of Barry Allen is a reworking of that original work. As a result, no one name is easily identifiable as the character's creator.

Fox's superhero, "The Flash" first appeared in Flash Comics #1 in 1940. In this story the man in the costume (he wore no mask) was named Jay Garrick. He rose in popularity and appeared in four comic book titles.

After World War II, superheroes declined in popularity, causing many of the Flash's comic book series to be canceled. All-Flash was canceled in 1948 after 32 issues and Comic Cavalcade became a talking animal humor book. Flash Comics was canceled in 1949 after 104 issues. All-Star Comics was canceled in 1951 after 57 issues, marking Garrick's last Golden Age appearance.

The popularity and circulation of comic books about superheroes had declined following World War II, and comic books about horror, crime and romance took larger shares of the market. However, controversy arose over alleged links between comic books and juvenile delinquency, focusing in particular on crime, horror, and certain elements of superheroes. In 1954, publishers implemented the Comics Code Authority to regulate comic content.

In the wake of these changes, publishers began introducing superhero stories again (as preferable to crime and horror), a change that began with the introduction of a new version of DC Comics' The Flash in Showcase #4 (October 1956).

In 1956, DC Comics reinvented the Flash character, giving him a new costume, name, and background. Carmine Infantino alleged the character design was from a Captain Marvel homage he created earlier dubbed Captain Whiz. This new Flash, named Barry Allen, was completely unrelated to Jay Garrick. In fact, Garrick had never existed, as far as the new books were concerned. Barry Allen's first appearance shows him reading a copy of Flash Comics, lamenting that Garrick was "just a character some writer dreamed up". Readers welcomed the new Flash, but still had an interest in the old one. 1956's Showcase #4 featured two Flash stories, "Mystery of the Human Thunderbolt!", and "The Man Who Broke the Time Barrier!" During an era marked by rapid scientific advancements and Cold War anxieties, the stories in "Showcase #4" reflect contemporary themes of technological triumph and societal stability. "Mystery of the Human Thunderbolt!" introduces Barry Allen, a police scientist who gains super-speed powers, symbolizing the era's optimism about scientific progress and the need for heroes who embody justice. The inclusion of a bank robber as a villain resonated with readers due to prevalent fears about financial security and crime. "The Man Who Broke the Time Barrier!" parallels the groundbreaking achievement of breaking the sound barrier, exploring the potential of time travel influenced by Einstein's theories, and highlighting the fascination with overcoming natural limits through science.

Also introduced at this time was Iris West, Barry Allen's then love interest (and later wife), and "Lois Lane" to his "Clark Kent". Like Lois Lane, Iris West was a reporter, in this case for Picture News.

Wally West, the nephew of Iris West Allen, first appeared in Flash #110 (1959), which depicted his transformation into Kid Flash, the "Robin" to the Flash's "Batman". Wally West would later go on to become the new Flash many years later.

Jay Garrick made a guest appearance in 1961 in Flash #123 "Flash of Two Worlds". In this issue, Garrick was treated as residing in a parallel universe (Earth-Two), which allowed the character to exist without any continuity conflicts with Barry Allen (who existed on Earth-One), yet allowed him to make guest appearances in Silver Age books.

Barry Allen and Iris West were shown to get married in 1966 in Flash #165 "One Bridegroom Too Many!"

=== Important Publication Milestones ===
1. "Justice League of America" (1960):
  - First Appearance in JLA: Barry Allen's The Flash first appeared in "The Brave and the Bold" #28 (1960). This was the first published story of Barry Allen's involvement with the superhero team, the Silver Age "Justice League" (Similar in many ways to the Golden Age "Justice Society").
2. "Flash of Two Worlds" (1961):
  - In Flash #123, Barry Allen meets Jay Garrick, establishing the concept of the Multiverse, which became a cornerstone of DC Comics' continuity.
3. "The Trial of The Flash" (1983–1984):
  - This storyline in The Flash #323–350 detailed Barry Allen's trial for the murder of his arch-nemesis, Reverse-Flash, and concluded with Barry's retirement and moving to the future with Iris.
4. "Crisis on Infinite Earths" (1985–1986):
  - Barry Allen sacrifices himself to save the Multiverse in this landmark crossover event, leading to his apparent death. He disappeared for over two decades in comic book time.
5. "The Return of Barry Allen" (1993):
  - In The Flash #74–79, Barry appears to return, only for it to be revealed as a villainous plot. This storyline helped to solidify Wally West's role as the new Flash.
6. "The Flash: Rebirth" (2009):
  - Barry Allen is definitively resurrected and reestablished as the primary Flash in this six-issue miniseries. The story explores the impact of his return and reaffirms his place in the DC Universe.
7. "Flashpoint" (2011):
  - A major crossover event where Barry's actions create an alternate timeline, leading to the creation of The New 52, a significant reboot of DC's entire line of comics.
8. DC Rebirth (2016):
  - This initiative sought to restore elements of DC's continuity that fans loved, merging aspects of pre- and post-Flashpoint universes. Barry Allen plays a crucial role in these stories, once again anchoring the legacy of The Flash.
9. "Doomsday Clock" (2017–2019):
  - A sequel to Watchmen that integrates its universe with the DC Universe, with Barry Allen participating in the narrative that redefines the timeline and continuity of DC Comics.

== Fictional character biography ==
Bartholomew Henry "Barry" Allen, the son of Henry and Nora Allen, was born on a stormy night on May 13. Always tardy, Barry was born two weeks late, the second of a set of twins. His sibling was declared stillborn, Barry grew up feeling alone, as if something was missing, developing an interest in comics, especially his favorite superhero, the Flash.

Showcase#4 (October 1956): First appearance of the Silver Age Flash. Art by Carmine Infantino and Joe Kubert.

Barry Allen is a forensic chemist with a reputation for being very slow, and frequently late, which frustrates his fiancée, Iris West. One night, as he is working late on a new case, a lightning bolt strikes and shatters a case full of unspecified chemicals, drenching Barry, and temporarily knocking him out. As a result, Barry finds that he can run at super-human speeds and possesses equally enhanced reflexes, senses, and healing. He dubs himself the Flash (after his childhood comic book hero, Jay Garrick), and becomes Central City's resident costumed crime fighter and protector.

Central City University professor Ira West (Iris's adoptive father) designed Barry's costume and the ring which stores it while Barry is in his civilian identity. The ring can eject the compressed clothing when Barry needs it and suck it back in with the aid of a special gas that shrinks the suit. In addition, Barry invents the cosmic treadmill, a device that allows for precise time travel. Barry is warmly received by his superhero colleagues, so much so, that nearly all speedsters that come after him are often compared to him. Batman says "Barry is the kind of man that I would've hoped to become if my parents had not been murdered."

=== Justice League ===
As presented in Justice League of America #9, when the Earth is infiltrated by Appellaxian warriors, some of the world's greatest heroes join forces, Barry among them. While the superheroes individually defeat most of the invaders, they fall prey to a single alien and only by working together are able to defeat the warrior. Afterwards, they decide to establish the Justice League.

During the years, Barry is depicted as feeling slightly attracted to Black Canary and Zatanna but never pursues a relationship because he feels his real love is Iris West, whom he ultimately marries. Barry also becomes a good friend of Green Lantern (Hal Jordan), which would later be the subject of the limited series Flash and Green Lantern: The Brave and the Bold.

In The Flash #123—"Flash of Two Worlds"—Barry is transported to Earth-Two where he meets Jay Garrick, the original Flash in DC Continuity; it is revealed that Jay Garrick's adventures were captured in comic book form on Earth-One. This storyline initiates DC's multiverse and is continued in issues of Flash and in team-ups between the Justice League of America of Earth-One and the Justice Society of America of Earth-Two. In the story from Flash #179—"The Flash – Fact or Fiction?"—Barry is thrown into the universe called Earth Prime, a representation of "our" universe, where he seeks the aid of the Flash comic book's editor Julius Schwartz to build a cosmic treadmill so that he can return home. He also gains a sidekick and protégé in Iris' nephew, Wally West, who gains super-speed in an accident similar to that which gave Barry his powers.

=== Tragedy ===
In time, Barry marries his girlfriend Iris West, who learns of his double identity because Barry talks in his sleep. She keeps this secret, and he reveals his identity to her of his own free will with Moreno's persuasion. Iris is revealed to have been sent as a child from the 30th century and adopted.

In the 1980s, Flash's life begins to collapse. Iris is murdered by Zoom (a supervillain from the 25th century who had long loved her and been jealous of Barry), and when Barry prepares to marry another woman, Zoom tries the same trick again. Barry stops him, killing Zoom in the process by breaking his neck. Unfortunately, when Barry is unable to make an appearance at his own wedding, his fiancée descends into madness.

Placed on trial for murder in connection with Zoom's death, Barry is found guilty by the jury. When he is told by a juror Nathan Newbury, who is being possessed by a mind from the future, that Reverse-Flash (whom Barry knows to be dead) brainwashed the jury into this verdict, Flash flees his trial. The Flash is then attacked by Reverse-Flash, and realizes that the answers to this mystery, and restoring his good name, lie in the future, so Newbury uses a time device to send them forward. They discover that Abra Kadabra was disguised as Reverse-Flash to ruin the Flash's good name. Defeating Kadabra, he retreats to the future to be reunited with Iris, having learned that Iris' spirit was in fact drawn to the 30th century, and given a new body (and had been inhabiting Newbury's body).

=== Crisis on Infinite Earths ===
Following the trial, Barry retires and joins Iris in the 30th century. After only a few weeks of happiness, the Crisis on Infinite Earths intervenes, and Barry is captured by the Anti-Monitor and brought to 1985; according to the Anti-Monitor, the Flash is the only being capable of traveling to other universes at will, so the Anti-Monitor could not allow him to stay free. Barry escapes and foils the Anti-Monitor's plan to destroy the Earth with an anti-matter cannon, creating a speed vortex to draw the power in, but dies in the process as the power becomes too much for his body. After Barry's death, Kid Flash Wally West, his nephew and sidekick, takes up the mantle of the Flash.

==== After death ====
Barry Allen as depicted in Quasar, art by Mike Manley.

In the series Quasar, an amnesiac Barry Allen enters the Marvel Universe in the middle of the great race to be the "Fastest Man Alive", where he is discovered by the Runner and invited to participate in the race. Beating several other speedsters, Barry is declared to be the "fastest man alive", though he never recovers his memory during his time in the universe. Barry is returned to his original universe with Makkari's assistance.

Iris is pregnant and has two children who have super-speed powers, the Tornado Twins, who later meet the Legion of Super-Heroes. In the multiversal variant known as Earth-247, each of her children themselves have children with speed-based abilities. One, Jenni Ognats, grows up to become the Legionnaire XS, while the other, Bart Allen, is born with an accelerated metabolism that rapidly ages him, and is sent back to the 20th century where he is cured by Wally West. He remains there as the superhero Impulse under the tutelage of Max Mercury, and later becomes the second Kid Flash as a member of the Teen Titans.

=== Flash's return ===
Twenty three years after his death in Crisis on Infinite Earths #8, Barry Allen returned to the present DC Universe in DC Universe #0, preceding his full-time return in the pages of Final Crisis.

DC Universe #0 features an unnamed narrator who initially associates himself with "everything". He begins to recall his past and association with Justice League members, particularly Hal Jordan and Superman. The lettering in which he speaks to the reader is yellow on backgrounds that are initially black. As the story moves forward, the background slowly begins turning red. In the final pages, the narration boxes feature a yellow lightning bolt. Over time, as he recalls friendships and connections with other people, his mind begins to narrow, remarking "I...know him. I am no longer everything. I am a shaft of light split through a prism". Yet he is still the only one able to see "the shadow falling over everything", in the form of Darkseid. On the final page, the moon appears in front of a red sky, as a yellow lightning bolt strikes in front of it creating the logo of the Flash, as he remarks "and now I remember".

A Daily News story released on the same day proclaimed that Barry Allen has returned to life, with issue co-writer Geoff Johns stating, "When the greatest evil comes back to the DC Universe, the greatest hero needed to return."

Barry Allen returns to the DC Universe, fleeing from the Black Racer. Art from Final Crisis #2 by J. G. Jones.

==== Final Crisis ====
Barry makes his corporeal return in Final Crisis #2, where he is seen in pursuit of the bullet which kills Orion. Lamenting on Orion's death, which he was unable to stop, Barry wonders why he is now alive after being dead for so long. It is then that Barry and Wally are confronted by Wonder Woman, Batwoman, Catwoman, and Giganta, who have been transformed into the new Female Furies following the release of the Anti-Life Equation.

After escaping the Female Furies, Barry stops to see his wife Iris and save her from the slavery of the Anti-Life Equation. Seeing his wife again for the first time in years, Barry is overcome with emotion and gives his brainwashed wife a deep kiss. While kissing her, the Speed Force sparkles out of his body, enveloping Iris and freeing her from the Equation. The Allens and Wally West are left to fend in a conquered world. Barry and Wally lead the Black Racer to Darkseid, dealing Darkseid a blow that, coupled with Batman shooting him in the shoulder with the god-bullet, would facilitate his ultimate defeat.

==== The Flash: Rebirth ====
In 2009, writer Geoff Johns and artist Ethan Van Sciver created The Flash: Rebirth, a six-issue miniseries bringing Barry Allen back to a leading role in the DC Universe as the Flash, much in the same vein as Green Lantern: Rebirth. The series begins with the cities of Central and Keystone celebrating the return of "Central City's Flash", Wonder Woman having used her government contacts to create the story that Barry was in witness protection to account for his resurrection. Avoiding the parades, parties, and other celebrations of his return, Barry instead contemplates why he is alive again.

It is then revealed that Flash's mother was murdered when he was a child, and his father was arrested for the crime. Before he can contemplate this any further, Savitar escapes the Speed Force. Barry inadvertently kills Savitar on contact. At that moment, Wally West, West's children Iris and Jai, Liberty Belle, Jay Garrick, and Kid Flash all experience painful convulsions and are engulfed in lightning. Wally West manages to catch a glimpse of Barry and sees him as the new Black Flash. When he realizes that his presence could damage or kill other innocents, Barry flees back into the Speed Force, where he encounters Johnny Quick and Max Mercury. Max attempts to tell Barry that his becoming the Black Flash is not his fault. When Max and Barry are pulled into another pocket of the Speed Force, the real culprit reveals himself: Professor Zoom.

Barry chases after Zoom and is joined by Wally, who tells Barry to push as hard as he can to break the time barrier. They reach Thawne, and their lightnings turn Barry's past self into the Flash in the altered timeline (preserving Barry's destiny) as they are able to stop Zoom from killing Iris. As the two Flashes push Zoom back through time to the present, they see that the Justice League, the Justice Society, and the Outsiders have built a device specifically for Thawne. Barry tosses him in and activates the device, severing his connection to the negative Speed Force. The Flashes tie Zoom up to stop him from running. With the threat ended, everyone celebrates by welcoming Barry back and the speedsters in general. Later, Barry closes the case on his mother's death and opts to take all the other cold cases they had after his death. Barry spends some time with Iris before racing to Washington to celebrate his return with the Justice League, apologizing for being late.

==== Blackest Night ====
Barry Allen as a member of the Blue Lantern Corps during the Blackest Night event. Cover art to Blackest Night: The Flash #3 by Scott Kolins.

Barry Allen is one of the main characters in Blackest Night alongside Hal Jordan. Barry appears alongside Jordan in the Free Comic Book Day issue Blackest Night #0 which acts as a prologue to the event.

After fighting off the undead Martian Manhunter and other Black Lanterns, Barry, along with Wally and Bart, races across the globe to warn every superhero community across the planet. His message also inadvertently warns the Rogues. They all realize that their deceased members would come after them and decide to strike first at Iron Heights Penitentiary, unaware that the undead Rogues are ready for them. Barry attempts to seek aid from Solovar, unaware that Solovar had been killed years before.

At Coast City, Barry witnesses the arrival of the Black Lanterns' demonic lord, Nekron, and his disciples Scar and Black Hand. The Justice League, the Titans, Wally, and Bart arrive to aid Barry to take a stand against Nekron. Nekron reveals that all the resurrected heroes are tied to him because he allowed them to rise again. As such they belong to him. Nekron then used a series of black rings to turn Superman, Wonder Woman, Troia, Green Arrow, Bart, and several other resurrected heroes into Black Lanterns. Barry and Jordan find themselves being targeted by black rings and are forced to flee or risk joining the others as Black Lanterns. As Barry and Jordan rejoin the heroes against Nekron and his army, Ganthet, one of the Guardians of the Universe and a leader of the Blue Lantern Corps, summons a blue power ring and Barry is chosen as a Blue Lantern so he would be more effective during the battle.

After being chosen as a Blue Lantern, Barry joins forces with Saint Walker to continue battling the Black Lanterns alongside the understanding of the potentials and limitations of his new power ring. During the battle, Barry is forced to fight Bart, who his ring detects is still alive but would die if not free from the black ring soon. Barry is shown to be skilled with his ring in creating energy constructs based on his imagination and the ability to fly (possibly because of the understanding with Jordan's ring), as he can create images of Bart as Impulse and Kid Flash against him to make him feel again. Barry's plan almost works as Bart reacts to the images of his past, and the constructs attempt to take the black ring from him, but later is interrupted by the Black Lantern Professor Zoom and Solovar. Wally and Walker later join Barry to fight against them.

=== The Flash Volume 3 ===
The new Flash series begins after the completion of Blackest Night and the beginning of Brightest Day. After the events of The Flash: Rebirth, Barry Allen is reintegrating himself into life in Central City. Under the cover of having been in witness protection, Barry returns to the Central City Police Department's crime lab and returns to the streets as the Flash. While readjusting to life as the Flash, a man appears out of thin air in the costume of Flash rogue the Mirror Master, and promptly dies on the street.

When Barry arrives on the scene to investigate, he sees the man is neither original Mirror Master Sam Scudder, or the current Mirror Master, Evan McCulloch. Hearing of another portal appearing, Barry transforms into the Flash and runs to investigate. When he arrives, a group of people in costumes similar to the Rogues, called the Renegades appear and tell Barry that they are from the 25th century, and that he is under arrest for murdering the "Mirror Monarch". Barry tells the crew that he has not killed anyone, to which their leader, "Commander Cold", tells him, "Not yet. But you will."

After a brief struggle, where Weather Warlock's time disc was damaged, the Renegades are forced back to the 25th century, which also caused the destruction of an apartment building due to their uncontrolled jump back. Barry saves everyone in the building, even rebuilding the building in minutes, and goes on to search for the true killer of Mirror Monarch. He is attacked again by the Renegades, but only before Captain Boomerang shows up, now wielding explosive energy boomerangs. Boomerang fights both the Flash and the Renegades, and a confused Top (one of the Renegades from the 25th century) questions his teammates on whether or not Barry Allen is the man they are looking for, pointing out that in their timeline, Boomerang never showed up.

The Renegades finally corner Captain Boomerang when the Rogues arrive with a giant mirror left by the previous Mirror Master that says "In Case The Flash Returns Break Glass". An all out brawl ensues as the Rogues battle the Renegades. Meanwhile, Flash is confronted by Top who warns him that the reason he will kill Mirror Monarch is because of Iris's death, which he claims will be caused when the giant mirror breaks, releasing the Mirror Lords. Top tells Barry that one of the Mirror Lords will possess Iris and take her away from him. Barry races to stop the mirror from breaking, with Top at his side. However, when the White Lantern entity reaches out to Captain Boomerang, telling him to "throw the boomerang", Boomerang responds by throwing dozens of boomerangs in every direction. One of them hits the glass and it begins to break. Top tells Flash to stop the Mirror Lords, while he goes and protects Iris. Flash questions does not make sense, but Top throws him into the mirror and flees.

In the mirror, Flash is exposed to strange visions of his mother. Outside, the Rogue Mirror Master tells the others that the mirror is actually a slow acting poison and they flee. Barry escapes the mirror confused and asks, "Where are the Mirror Lords?" He is then arrested by the Renegades, who realize that this was all a setup by Top to frame the Flash for his own personal gains. Barry is transported to a 25th-century court, while Top confronts Iris.

The story concludes with Barry escaping the 25th century court and going after Top. Top reveals that the reason for all of his crimes is because Barry reopened a previously closed case. Barry felt that the person convicted was actually innocent. The person who is actually guilty of the crime is one of Top's ancestors. Top reveals that they do not allow anyone in the Renegades who has any ancestors with a criminal record. The Flash is able to beat Top, and convict the right man for murder, letting go the innocent man who was sent to prison. Afterward, the 25th century court and the Renegades go over the facts, realizing that the Flash was right and that their entire record of history is wrong. A man on a Speed Force-powered motorcycle (later revealed to be a Speed Force police officer under the name of Hot Pursuit) moves through the desert and says that if Barry does not find the flashpoint, it will destroy the world. As he continues through the desert, Speed Force lightning strikes in the distance.

In a Green Lantern storyline, Barry becomes the latest host for the embodiment of fear, Parallax, after he joins Hal Jordan's quest of locating all of the entities who each represent aspects of the power of the emotional spectrum. Barry was susceptible to the entity's attacks due to his fear for Jordan's safety. Barry is freed after the embodiment of compassion, Proselyte, helps him remember his capability for benevolence over his fear.

==== Flashpoint ====
As the story begins, Barry Allen wakes up in his office and discovers that his mother is alive, there is no trace of Superman, Wonder Woman and Aquaman leading their respective nations in a war, his wife Iris West is unmarried, and himself currently powerless. Barry seeks the aid of Batman, driving to Gotham City and entering a run-down Wayne Manor. He explores what turns out to be a small Batcave until he is attacked by Batman. Barry tries to explain who he is by saying he knows Batman is Bruce Wayne, only to find that in this reality, Batman is Thomas Wayne. While Barry is being beat up by Batman, he explains about his secret identity as the Flash and his relation to Bruce Wayne. Barry's memories spontaneously change and he realizes that the world of Flashpoint is not an alternate dimension, but his own. Barry uses his ring, which he uses to contain his Flash outfit, but the ring instead ejects Professor Zoom's costume. Barry tells Batman that Zoom is taunting him with it. Barry explains that both he and Zoom have the ability to alter time, leading Batman to ask him about how Bruce was to have lived in his place and if he can really change the world. Barry states that he needs his speed first. Later, Barry and Batman create an electric chair-like device to try and recreate the accident that gave him his speed; however, the first attempt meets with failure, leaving Barry severely burned.

Barry awakes on an operating table in the Batcave with third-degree burns. Despite Thomas' advice, Barry sits back down in the electric chair device. When lightning strikes a second time, Barry's super-speed returns, and he then saves Batman from being impaled on a fence. Barry's injuries are healing rapidly due to his speed-enhanced regeneration. He also makes a new copy of his Flash costume. The Flash researches the incarnations of heroes of the DC timeline, believing that Zoom deliberately changed their lives to prevent the Flash from creating a Justice League, and learns of a rocket that crashed into Metropolis which carried the infant Superman, who instead of being raised in Kansas was taken in by the government. They then contact Cyborg for his help in sneaking into the government bunker of "Project: Superman" that is 'raising' Superman after his rocket destroyed Metropolis upon its arrival, only to be disappointed at Superman's frail appearance. They head towards Project: Superman's underground base via the sewer. The group comes across a giant vault door bearing the Superman logo. After they open the door, the three see a pale, weakened Kal-El. Despite his appearance, Barry says that no matter what, Superman will always be a good person. When the arrival of guards forces them to escape, Superman's powers begin to manifest and he flies off leaving them at the hands of the guards.

While they fend off the guards, they are rescued by Element Woman. Barry's memories begin to change much more drastically, altering his past. He states that he is running out of time and soon he will not be able to restore the timeline to normal. After Barry is recovering, he asks the heroes to stop the Atlantean/Amazon war from creating more casualties, although the heroes are not willing to unless Batman wants to join them. Cyborg explains to him that they believe Batman was invincible. However, Barry convinces him that no one is invincible; the Marvel Family and Batman agree to join him. The heroes arrive at New Themyscira to stop the Atlantean/Amazon war, and appear to be winning until Enchantress reveals herself as the Amazon spy and uses her magic to separate the Marvel Family and restore them to their mortal forms. Penthesilea kills Billy Batson just as Professor Zoom reveals himself to Barry. Professor Zoom reveals to him that the "Flashpoint" timeline was created by Barry himself, after he traveled back in time to stop Zoom from killing his mother, but the timeline diverted into the near-apocalyptic world they find themselves in. He continues to taunt Barry with this knowledge, but is suddenly stabbed in the back by Batman wielding an Amazonian sword. Before Barry returns the timeline to normal, Batman thanks him for all he has done and gives him a letter addressed to his son. After this, Barry bids a farewell to his mother, knowing he must travel back in time to stop his younger self from altering time. Through the fusions of the time stream, Barry seemingly hears a voice explaining that the three timelines and worlds, need to become one again and would need his help to do this. After the ordeals, he visits the real Bruce Wayne and gives him the letter from his alternate father. Bruce is grateful to Barry of informing him of the events of the "Flashpoint" before the timeline was apparently returned to normal.

=== The New 52 ===
DC Comics relaunched The Flash with issue #1 in September 2011, with writing and art handled by Francis Manapul and Brian Buccellato as part of DC's company-wide title relaunch, The New 52. As with all of the books associated with the DC relaunch, Barry Allen appears to be about five years younger than the previous incarnation of the character. He gains his powers after getting frustrated and throwing a small machine at the window of his lab. The machine breaks through the window, leaving a hole big enough for a bolt of lightning to charge through the hole and strike him.

In the second issue of the new Justice League title (the first released comic series of the New 52 initiative and "opening shot" of the new DC Universe), Flash is called to assist Green Lantern and Batman in wrangling an out-of-control Superman, and later assists with the pursuit of an alien, revealed to be an agent of Darkseid. In this new continuity, Barry's marriage to Iris West never took place, and he is instead in a relationship with longtime co-worker Patty Spivot. In this new series, the Flash draws deeper into the Speed Force, enhancing his mental abilities while still trying to fully grasp his powers, which he does not yet exert total control over.

The series reveals that Barry Allen's father was placed in prison for the murder of his mother. The murder occurred shortly after Barry returned victorious from a school spelling bee, and Barry placed the trophy he won on his mother's grave in her memory. While the evidence seems to indicate his father's guilt, Barry prioritizes proving his father's innocence.

Barry is also part of the main cast of the relaunched Justice League series, making his debut in the series' second issue. Following Convergence, Barry has a new suit in issue #41, which has a darker shade and features more streaks.

=== DC Rebirth ===
Barry Allen, the second Flash, during the DC Rebirth events, on the cover of The Flash (vol. 5) #78 (September 2019). Art by Paolo Pantalena.

During DC Rebirth, Barry is no longer the only Flash. It is revealed that Wally West has been lost in the Speed Force for ten years, realizing during this time that Barry is not responsible for changing the timeline after the Flashpoint crisis, the unknown entity used Barry's time traveling as an opportunity to fundamentally alter reality. The fallout of the recent Darkseid War allowed Wally to try and reach out to his former friends in the hopes of either returning or warning them of the truth, but each attempt caused him to fall further into the Speed Force. After realizing not even Linda (his traditional "lightning rod") could remember him, Wally sank into desolation and chose to appear before Barry one last time to thank him for the life he had given him. Just before Wally disappeared, Barry remembered him and dragged him free of the Speed Force. Following a tearful reunion, Wally gave Barry his warning of the true source of the universal change and the dangers to come. Because of Wally, Barry is now aware that the timeline is not reset correctly after Flashpoint and thus another alternate timeline. However, he still cannot remember his pre-Flashpoint life, such as people like Jay Garrick, his long-last marriage with Iris, and the details of his feuds with the Reverse-Flash / Eobard Thawne (who now remembers their pre-Flashpoint history), and remembers Wally from their new DC Rebirth timeline history. Despite being informed by Wally that another party is responsible, Barry remains in guilt over his mistakes, and seeks to find and stop them in hopes of making amends. Although the two decide to keep Wally's return secret from Iris based on Wally's own experience with Linda, Barry encourages him to return to the Titans, but also recommends that he don a new costume to reflect that he is the Flash rather than 'Kid Flash'. While Wally considers his options, Barry visits Batman to discuss the new evidence of some outside force attacking them, musing on how personal this assault appears, but despite the potential danger, Batman and Barry agree to keep their investigation to themselves until they know what they are up against. Later, when Eobard Thawne attacks Iris and Wallace, Iris has glimpses of her pre-Flashpoint life with Barry and learns his secrets as the Flash in the process. Barry then learned of their marriage in the other timeline as well. Knowing from Thawne that her entire life has been drastically altered and that Barry is indirectly responsible for it as the result of his time-traveling actions, Iris now distrusts Barry. To make matters worse for Barry, while he is entering the Negative Speed Force, he becomes the Negative Flash which is more lethal than the original, and mostly dangerous to control.

After defeating Gorilla Grodd and getting Wally to meet Iris for the first time, they encounter the Renegades. The Renegades take the Flashes and Iris back to the 25th century to get answers about why Iris killed Eobard Thawne, only to discover that Hunter Zolomon has been manipulating everyone in a plot to bring conflict between Barry and Wally for the fate of the Speed Force. After Wally defeated Zolomon, Barry places him under watch at the Sanctuary while he is moving in with his girlfriend Iris at her place after Wallace angrily left them. Barry begins searching for the other forces. Zolomon arrives, powered with the Sage and Strength Force, claiming to be the "one true Flash". He defeats Barry and takes Steadfast away to claim the Still Force for himself. Black Flash also arrives and warns the defeated Barry not to interfere in his mission. Zolomon tortures Steadfast to give him the Still Force, but Steadfast resists. Finally, a revived Barry tracks down Zolomon and tries to rescue Steadfast, but Zolomon's power over other forces proves too much for him. Steadfast tries to use the Still Force to stop both the speedsters, but the plan backfires as Zolomon approaches and takes the Still Force. With the control of all four forces, Zolomon enters the Forever Force. He manages to track down the Still Force user Steadfast and the Strength Force user Fuerza to bring them to his team after the Black Flash starts hunting the other force users to prevent them from using their powers as the other forces weaken and deplete the Speed Force. However, the Sage Force user Psych refuses to join Barry's team only to be later tracked down and killed by the Black Flash. To safeguard the other force users Barry sends Fuerza and Commander Cold to the Strength Force and stays behind with Steadfast.

Barry meets Zolomon again, and watches as Zolomon sacrifices himself to heal the Force barriers. Barry Allen is forced to recruit Eobard Thawne and Godspeed in his help against a villain name Paradox by traveling back in time to the place where Eobard murdered his mother. Eobard and Godspeed help Barry defeat Paradox, but Eobard kills Godspeed and escapes. Eobard Thawne takes over Barry's body, but Barry manages to free himself with the help of Jesse Chambers and Max Mercury while meeting Inertia in the Speed Force for the first time.

During the climactic battle, Barry is enraged that Eobard Thawne subliminally caused Wally West to murder people in the Sanctuary. Barry decides to forgive Eobard to untether him from the timeline. When Eobard rushes at him, Barry vibrates through the attack, and transfers some of his Speed Force into Eobard, effectively reverting Eobard back to normal. After the battle, Barry cleans up the neighborhood and meets one of Eobard's ancestors Macy, but decides to do nothing and tells Iris he will try to find Wally. In "Dark Nights: Death Metal", Barry and Wally reconcile with each other while fighting off The Batman Who Laughs' army to reach Metron's chair.

=== Infinite Frontier ===
During Infinite Frontier, Barry leaves Earth and Justice League to be a representative for the multiversal Justice League, and goes to different worlds to stabilize them. Barry is captured by Darkseid and is forced on a treadmill to allow Darkseid more power to control the Multiverse. Calvin Ellis frees Barry from the cosmic treadmill, but it causes him to be transported to Multiverse-2, the ruined Multiverse after the first crisis. He meets Pariah who imprisons him in a dream world. Wally West and Linda Park free Barry from his prison, and the rest of the speedsters return to Earth while Barry tries to find the Justice League. Barry saves Hal Jordan when he is imprisoned by Pariah, and they regroup the Justice League. Barry and Hal create a plan to go back to Earth to help the heroes fight against The Great Darkness, and help the heroes clean up the wreckage.

=== Dawn of DC ===
Barry had planned to propose to Iris, but an attack from an alien species kills her. He helps Wally and the fellow speedsters defeat the alien army and undo Iris' death, and she accepts his proposal. In "Absolute Power", Barry is the only member of the Flash family to still have a connection to the Speed Force after the connections of the other speedsters are severed by Amanda Waller. After Waller's Amazo task force is defeated, Barry's powers are taken and the rest of the speedsters lose access to the multiverse.

== Powers and abilities ==
As with all Speed Force users/conduits Barry's main power is superhuman speed. Barry is generally considered to be the second fastest non-omnipotent character in the DC Universe after his successor and nephew Wally West. Barry is capable of running many magnitudes faster than light speed. Barry has been calculated as going as fast as 13 million times the speed of light and has feats that are faster. He has outrun numerous incredibly fast characters including Reverse Flash, Superman, Supergirl, and the Black Racer, the "Grim Reaper" of speedsters.

Barry's speed has numerous secondary applications. He can use it to generate cyclones by spinning his arms quickly. By vibrating the molecules in his body at hypersonic frequencies, Barry can turn invisible or phase through solid matter. Barry can also manipulate the electrical Speed Force energy he generates. He can channel the energy into arcs of lightning, as well as use the electricity to manipulate magnetism on a minor level. He has also used the lightning to create blinding amounts of light. By interlocking his lightning with that of another speedster, Barry can short circuit their connection to the Speed Force. Barry is also immune to telepathic attacks and control as he can shift his thoughts at a speed faster than normal thought via the Speed Force. Through "speed-reading", he can absorb large amounts of information into his short-term memory, which remain in his mind just long enough for him to make use of it. Using this technique, Barry was able to learn enough about building work to rebuild a destroyed apartment building. The Speed Force also supplies Barry with a protective aura that shields him and people he carries from friction and kinetic impacts, as well as grants him superhuman durability. Other aspects of Barry's powers include an enhanced metabolism, which grants him a regenerative healing factor. In the New 52, Barry learned that his body is using the Speed Force to its full extent but his brain was not. With the help of Dr. Elias he was able to learn how to use the Speed Force to process more information, and make even quicker decisions, to the point where he feels like he can see everything before it happens. Barry also developed the ability to speed up the flow of time around him, which he used to negate the powers of Zoom, who was able to slow down time. In terms of DC's internal lexicon, Barry is classified as a metahuman: a human being who possesses extranormal abilities either through birth or as the result of some external event.

As of 2024, Barry no longer has any powers due to the events of Absolute Power, where he sacrificed his connection to the Speed Force.

== Rogues gallery ==
Some of the Flash's enemies formed a loose association and referred to themselves as the Rogues, disdaining the use of the term "supervillain" or "super-criminal". These criminals typically have unusually modest goals for their power level (robbery or other petty crimes), and each have adopted a specific theme in their equipment and methods.

== Other versions ==
Many alternate universe versions of Barry Allen have appeared throughout the character's publication history.

- In the series League of Justice, Allen is known as Phaeton.
- In The Dark Knight Strikes Again, Allen was captured by Lex Luthor and forced to act as a power source for most of the East Coast. After being rescued by Carrie Kelley's forces, Allen dons a black version of his original Flash costume and aids Batman and other heroes in restoring order.
- In Batman: Holy Terror, Allen was killed after losing the aura that protects him from the friction he generates while running.
- On Earth -52, a universe in the Dark Multiverse, Allen was forcibly fused with his universe's Batman, who had been driven insane after the deaths of his sidekicks and used his new powers to become the Red Death.

== In other media ==
=== Television ===
- Barry Allen / Flash appears in The Superman/Aquaman Hour of Adventure, voiced by Cliff Owens. This version is a founding member of the Justice League.
- Barry Allen / Flash appears in the Super Friends franchise, voiced by Jack Angel. This version is a member of the eponymous group.
- Barry Allen / Flash appears in Legends of the Superheroes, portrayed by Rod Haase.

John Wesley Shipp as Barry Allen / Flash in The Flash (1990)

- Barry Allen / Flash appears in The Flash (1990), portrayed by John Wesley Shipp. Prior to Shipp's casting, CBS originally wanted Jack Coleman in the role, but he declined to pursue a career in Broadway. This version was inspired to become the Flash after his older brother Jay Allen is murdered by a gang leader and initially used a prototype deep-sea diving suit to control his powers. Additionally, he is a forensic scientist for the Central City Police Department and frequently assisted in his crime-fighting endeavors by S.T.A.R. Labs scientist Tina McGee. This version of the Flash also appears in the Arrowverse crossover events "Elseworlds" and "Crisis on Infinite Earths", where he sacrifices himself to save the multiverse from the Anti-Monitor.
- Barry Allen / Flash appears in Justice League of America, portrayed by Kenny Johnston. This version is in his 20s and unemployed.
- Barry Allen / Flash appears in The Batman, voiced by Charlie Schlatter. This version is a founding member of the Justice League.
- Barry Allen / Flash appears in Batman: The Brave and the Bold, voiced by Alan Tudyk. This version is a member of the Justice League.
- Barry Allen / Flash appears in DC Super Friends: The Joker's Playhouse, voiced by Eric Bauza.
- Barry Allen / Flash appears in Young Justice, voiced initially by George Eads in the first season and most of the second season and subsequently by James Arnold Taylor. This version is a member of the Justice League, mentor to Wally West, and friend of Jay Garrick.
- Barry Allen / Flash makes primarily non-speaking appearances in Teen Titans Go!, voiced by P. J. Byrne in the episode "Teen Titans Action". This version is a member of the Justice League.
- Barry Allen / Flash appears in DC Super Friends (2015), voiced by Yuri Lowenthal.
- Barry Allen / Flash appears in Justice League Action, voiced again by Charlie Schlatter. This version is a member of the Justice League.
- Barry Allen / Flash appears in the Scooby-Doo and Guess Who? episode "One Minute Mysteries!", voiced again by Charlie Schlatter. This version is friends with Shaggy Rogers and Scooby-Doo, who are unaware of his secret identity.
- Barry Allen / Flash appears in DC Super Hero Girls (2019), voiced by Phil LaMarr. This version is a student at Metropolis High School, best friend of Barbara Gordon, and a member of the "Invincibros".
- Barry Allen / Flash appears in Harley Quinn, voiced by Scott Porter in the second season and Zeno Robinson in the fourth season. This version is a member of the Justice League.
- The Arrowverse incarnation of Barry Allen / Flash (see below) makes a cameo appearance in the Titans episode "Dude, Where's My Gar?" via archival footage.

==== Arrowverse ====
Grant Gustin as Barry Allen / The Flash in The CW network television series The Flash.

Barry Allen appears in media set in the Arrowverse, portrayed by Grant Gustin. This version is a fan, later close friend of, Oliver Queen and acquires his powers after being struck by lightning and doused in chemicals during the explosion of S.T.A.R. Labs' particle accelerator. Following his introduction in Arrow, Allen makes subsequent appearances in The Flash (2014), the Supergirl episode "Worlds Finest", and the animated web series Vixen.

- Additionally, Gustin portrays a non-metahuman Earth-2 doppelgänger of Allen and an evil, possible future, time remnant called Savitar.
- Allen appears in the animated web series Freedom Fighters: The Ray, voiced by Scott Whyte.

=== Film ===
- Adam Brody was intended to portray Barry Allen / Flash in Justice League: Mortal prior to its cancellation.
- Barry Allen / Flash appears in Justice League: The New Frontier, voiced by Neil Patrick Harris.
- Barry Allen / Flash appears in Justice League: Doom, voiced by Michael Rosenbaum. This version is a member of the Justice League.
- Barry Allen / Flash appears in films set in the DC Animated Movie Universe (DCAMU), voiced initially by Justin Chambers and subsequently by Christopher Gorham. This version is a member of the Justice League.
- Barry Allen / Flash appears in JLA Adventures: Trapped in Time, voiced by Jason Spisak.
- Barry Allen / Flash appears in the Lego Super Heroes film series, voiced by James Arnold Taylor. This version is a member of the Justice League.
- Barry Allen / Flash appears in the Batman Unlimited film series, voiced again by Charlie Schlatter.
- Barry Allen / Flash appears in DC Super Heroes vs. Eagle Talon, voiced by Daisuke Namikawa.
- Barry Allen / Flash appears in The Lego Batman Movie, voiced by Adam DeVine.
- Barry Allen / Flash appears in Teen Titans Go! To the Movies, voiced by Wil Wheaton.
- Barry Allen / Flash appears in Injustice, voiced by Yuri Lowenthal.
- Barry Allen / Flash appears in Teen Titans Go! & DC Super Hero Girls: Mayhem in the Multiverse, voiced again by Phil LaMarr.
- Barry Allen / Flash appears in DC League of Super-Pets, voiced by John Early. This version is a member of the Justice League and owner of Merton the Turtle / Terrific Whatzit.
- Barry Allen / Flash appears in the two-part film Justice League x RWBY: Super Heroes & Huntsmen, voiced by David Errigo Jr. in Part One and David Dastmalchian in Part Two. This version is a member of the Justice League.
- Barry Allen / Flash appears in films set in the Tomorrowverse, voiced by Matt Bomer. This version is a founding member of the Justice League.
- Barry Allen / Flash appears in Batman Ninja vs. Yakuza League, voiced by Nobuyuki Hiyama in Japanese and Benjamin McLaughlin in English.

=== DC Extended Universe ===
Barry Allen / Flash appears in media set in the DC Extended Universe (DCEU), portrayed by Ezra Miller. This version is initially a college student who works multiple jobs to fund his search for evidence to clear his father's name after the latter was framed for killing his wife. Additionally, his suit is said to be created with a material used in space shuttle hulls and he is a self-described "hippie, long hair, very attractive Jewish boy".

- First appearing in Batman v Superman: Dawn of Justice (2016), Lex Luthor acquired security footage of Barry using his powers to foil a convenience store robbery. Additionally, a future version of Barry travels back in time to warn Bruce Wayne about Superman.
- Barry makes a cameo appearance in a flashback in Suicide Squad (2016), in which he apprehends Captain Boomerang.
- In the Justice League (2017), Wayne recruits Barry into the titular team, though the latter is forced to confront his social awkwardness due to his powers. Eventually, Barry's jovial attitude helps him befriend the rest of the League, such as Victor Stone, and he goes on to help the team foil Steppenwolf's invasion of Earth and get a job as a forensic scientist for the Central City Police Department.
  - In the director's cut Zack Snyder's Justice League (2021), Barry meets Iris West and develops the ability to travel back in time, which he uses to save the world. Additionally, the possible future version of Barry also makes an appearance.
- Barry makes cameo appearances in the animated end credits of Shazam! (2019); the live-action Arrowverse crossover event "Crisis on Infinite Earths" (2019), in which he encounters his Arrowverse counterpart and gets the idea to call himself "The Flash"; and the Peacemaker episode "It's Cow or Never" (2022).
- Barry appears in The Flash (2023).

=== Video games ===
- Barry Allen / Flash appears as a playable character in Mortal Kombat vs. DC Universe, voiced by Taliesin Jaffe. Due to Superman and Raiden inadvertently fusing Darkseid and Shao Kahn into Dark Kahn and merging their respective universes, Barry and Liu Kang temporarily develop a psychic bond until Dark Kahn is defeated.
- Barry Allen / Flash appears in DC Universe Online, voiced by Dwight Schultz.
- Barry Allen / Flash appears as a playable character in Injustice: Gods Among Us, voiced by Neal McDonough. This version is a member of the Justice League. Additionally, an alternate reality variant joined High Councilor Superman's Regime, but eventually has second thoughts and defects to Batman's Insurgency to help dismantle the Regime before willingly surrendering himself to the authorities.
- Barry Allen / Flash appears as a playable character in Infinite Crisis.
- Barry Allen / Flash appears as a playable character in Arena of Valor.
- Barry Allen / Flash appears as a playable character in DC Unchained.
- The Injustice incarnation of Barry Allen / Flash appears as a playable character in Injustice 2, voiced again by Taliesin Jaffe. As of this game, the alternate reality Flash has been pardoned for his role in dismantling the Regime and now seeks to redeem himself by helping the Insurgency repel Brainiac's attack on Earth.
- Barry Allen / Flash appears in Justice League: Cosmic Chaos, voiced again by Josh Keaton.
- Barry Allen / Flash appears as a boss in Suicide Squad: Kill the Justice League, voiced again by Scott Porter. This version is a member of the Justice League.

==== Lego series ====
- Barry Allen / Flash appears in Lego Batman 2: DC Super Heroes, voiced again by Charlie Schlatter.
- Barry Allen / Flash appears in Lego Batman 3: Beyond Gotham, voiced again by Charlie Schlatter.
- Barry Allen / Flash appears in Lego DC Super-Villains, voiced by Michael Rosenbaum.
- Barry Allen / Flash appears in Lego Dimensions, voiced again by Charlie Schlatter.

=== Miscellaneous ===
- Barry Allen / Flash appears in Jim's Big Ego's song "Ballad of Barry Allen", which was released as part of the album, They're Everywhere. This version possesses an accelerated perception of the world, causing him to see reality moving at a snail's pace and gradually slip into depression. Jim Infantino, the band's frontman and nephew of Allen's co-creator Carmine Infantino, provided the cover art for the album.
- A young Bartholomew Allen appears in Smallville Season 11. This version hails from the 30th century and is a descendant of Bart Allen.
- The Young Justice incarnation of Barry Allen / Flash appears in issue #5 of the series' self-titled tie-in comic book, which reveals that he gained his powers while attempting to recreate the accident that gave Jay Garrick his powers.
- The Injustice incarnation of Barry Allen / Flash appears in the Injustice: Gods Among Us prequel comic. Despite joining Superman's growing Regime, he maintains his sense of morality and initially questions Superman's increasingly drastic actions.
- Barry Allen / Flash appears in DC Super Hero Girls (2015) and its tie-in films, voiced by Josh Keaton. This version is a student at Super Hero High School.

== Reception and legacy ==
=== Legacy ===
The Flash has been established as a pop culture icon. and has appeared on lunch boxes, T-shirts, magazines, and commercials. Other products include cartoon shows, movies, books, hats, plush dolls, cereals, ice cream, bedding, kitchenware, clocks, purses, cufflinks, wallets, mugs, art prints, boxers, Lego sets, coaster sets, Hot Wheels sets, stationery sets, and board games.
