= Harry Lampert =

American cartoonist, contract bridge teacher and writer

- Born: November 3, 1916 New York City, New York, U.S.
- Died: November 13, 2004 (aged 88) Boca Raton, Florida, U.S.
- Areas: Penciller, Inker, Adman, Bridge teacher and writer
- Notable works: The Flash
- Awards: Inkpot Award (2000)

Harry Lampert (November 3, 1916 – November 13, 2004) was an American cartoonist and bridge teacher and writer.

== Biography ==
Born in New York City, Lampert began cartooning when he was sixteen years old, and worked for the legendary Max Fleischer, inking and helping produce Betty Boop, Popeye, and Koko the Clown cartoons. While stationed at Drew Field in Tampa, FL, he created Droopy the Drew Field Mosquito which ran in the Drew Field Echoes from 1942-1944. He began drawing comic books and he is best known in that field for being the artistic co-creator of the DC Comics superhero The Flash. Created in collaboration with writer Gardner Fox, the hero first appeared in Flash Comics #1 in 1940, but Lampert left The Flash after drawing only two stories, gravitating towards his preference for humorous work. (After he discovered his fame in the comics world 50 years later, Lampert observed that he did not own any " 'original' originals", not even a Flash comic book. "It was too expensive.") He also drew the comic book characters "The King", "Red, White and Blue" and "The Atom". Lampert later went on to draw gag cartoons for TIME, The New York Times, Esquire, and The Saturday Evening Post. He was also an instructor for the New York City School of Visual Arts and founded the Lampert Agency, an advertising company which produced award-winning ads for clients such as Olympic Airways, Seagram, and the U.S. Virgin Islands.

After his retirement in 1976, Lampert went on to write many instructional books on contract bridge. A Life Master and bridge teacher licensed by the American Contract Bridge League, Lampert spent years giving classes and working the cruise ship circuit teaching bridge to players. In the mid-1990s, Lampert became active in the comic book convention circuit, selling new sketches and autographs and speaking about his famous comic book creation.

Lampert died on November 13, 2004, in Boca Raton, Florida, of a cerebral hemorrhage; he was survived by wife Adele Lampert, daughter Karen Akavan and two grandsons.

== Bridge publications ==
- — (1978). Fun Way to Learn Serious Bridge. Roslyn, New York: Hardel Publishing. LCCN 78066744. Second edition 1980, The Fun Way to Serious Bridge; reprinted 1986, Simon & Schuster Fireside Books. LCCN 86-6657.
- — (1985). The Fun Way to Advanced Bridge. New York: Simon & Schuster Fireside Books. ISBN 0-671-53066-6. LCCN 84028802.
- — (1988). Declarer Play and Opening Leads, a Fun Way Bridge Book. Deerfield, IL: Private.
- — (1988). Teacher's Guide for Lesson Plans in Conjunction with Declarer Play and Opening Leads, a Fun Way Bridge Book. Deerfield, IL: Private.
- — (2002). Harry's Hands/Over 100 Funway Bridge Hands. Deerfield, IL: Private.
- — (2002). The Fun Way to Better Bridge. Louisville, KY: Devyn Press.

Pamphlets

- "Introduction to Defensive Play" (Devyn, 1989), Future Champions no. 10. OCLC 30309406
