= Laff-a-Day =

American comic strip

- Author(s): numerous
- Current status/schedule: Concluded daily gag panel; in reruns
- Launch date: January 8, 1936
- End date: 1998; 62 years
- Syndicate(s): King Features Syndicate
- Genre(s): humor

Laff-a-Day is a daily gag cartoon panel distributed to newspapers by King Features Syndicate from 1936 to 1998. The cartoonists included Frank Beaven, Henry Boltinoff, Dave Breger, Bo Brown, Orlando Busino, George Gately, Martin Giuffre, Al Kaufman, Reamer Keller, Harry Mace, Jack Markow, Don Orehek, Charles Skiles, Eli Stein, Jack Tippit and Bill Yates.

The editor of the series was cartoonist Bob Schroeter.

== Reprints ==
When King Features revived the series in 2006, it ran this promotional copy:

Times may change, but the laughs are forever! Here are three "retro" gag panels from the King Features treasure chest: Laff-a-Day, Hubert by Dick Wingert and Mister Breger by Dave Breger. Older readers may get an extra chuckle from scenes of traveling salesmen, two-ton Chevies and women sporting funny hats.

King Features made Laff-a-Day a part of its King Features Weekly Planet service.

== See also ==
- 1000 Jokes
- This Funny World
- laughitloud
