= The Adventures of Dean Martin and Jerry Lewis =

Comic book series

Adventures of Dean Martin and Jerry Lewis
- The Adventures of Dean Martin and Jerry Lewis #1 (1952).

Publication information
- Publisher: National Periodical Publications, an imprint of DC Comics
- Schedule: Semi-monthly
- Format: Ongoing series
- Publication date: 1952-1971
- No. of issues: 124
- Main character(s): Jerry Lewis; Dean Martin

Creative team
- Written by: Arnold Drake; Cal Howard
- Artist(s): Bob Oksner; Neal Adams

The Adventures of Dean Martin and Jerry Lewis is a celebrity comic book published by DC Comics and featuring the popular team of comedians Dean Martin and Jerry Lewis. The series ran for forty issues from 1952 through 1957, at which time it was renamed The Adventures of Jerry Lewis, despite the fact that in real life Martin and Lewis had dissolved their partnership a year before. At 124 issues, it is one of the longest-running comic book series starring a real person.

== Publication history ==
Since The Adventures of Dean Martin and Jerry Lewis was still selling well when Dean Martin and Jerry Lewis ended their partnership, DC Comics's initial reaction was to ignore the split. They continued publishing fictional adventures of the defunct duo for another year. However, with no new Dean Martin and Jerry Lewis movies on the horizon, DC ultimately decided that they needed to drop one or the other from the series. They chose Dean Martin because he was increasingly focusing on his career as a singer, and they preferred the series to star a comic.

The series continued as The Adventures of Jerry Lewis for issues #41-124. The new series featured Lewis in a variety of humorous situations. Infrequent guest stars included Batman, Bob Hope, Lex Luthor, Superman, the Flash, and Wonder Woman, thus establishing Jerry Lewis as existing within the DC Universe. Notable artists who worked on the series include Bob Oksner and Neal Adams. However, the creative team most associated with the series is writer Arnold Drake and artist Oksner. Though creator credits were not provided in the comics, Oksner has said that he drew the series from issue #5 until its end. "I enjoyed it so much, I would have paid them to allow me to do it," he commented. [emphasis in original]

Drake provided storyboards for each tale to explain the visuals for the artist. He said of working on The Adventures of Jerry Lewis, "I loved being able to make comedy an adventure. I put a lot of comedy into my adventure stories, and when I got to Bob Hope and Jerry Lewis, I put a lot of adventure into my comedy stories."

In 1964, Jerry's genius nephew Renfrew joined the book, and a year later, the cast included a fairy-tale witch housekeeper named Witch Kraft. Drake explained why he added the new characters: "The Hope and Lewis books were both dying when I took them over. I knew that the reason for this was that the kids couldn't relate to these characters. [Hope and Lewis] were not of their time. What the kids were relating to then was science fiction and horror. So I determined to inject science fiction and horror into Hope and Lewis. And it worked."

The entire DC humor line was cancelled between 1971 and 1972, including Jerry Lewis, Leave It to Binky, Date with Debbi and Swing with Scooter.

In 2007, Bob Oksner stated that he had had a greater role in writing the comic than previously acknowledged, explaining that the comic's editor, Larry Nadle, had persuaded Oksner to allow his writing credit (and thus payment) to be transferred to "another cartoonist" who Nadle described as being in debt to DC; in reality, Nadle was keeping the money. When this was discovered after Nadle's death in 1963, Oksner was suspected of collaborating with Nadle on the scheme and had to show his thumbnail sketches of the stories.

== See also ==
- The Adventures of Alan Ladd
- The Adventures of Bob Hope
