= Larry Nadle =

Larry Nadle in the 1950s

Lawrence Malcolm Nadle (September 29, 1913 in Manhattan - December 26, 1963) (sometimes credited as Larry Nadel) was a comic book editor and writer who was known for his work for DC Comics' romance comics, celebrity comics, and other humor-centric titles. Todd Klein has noted that Nadle's career in comics began "around 1943-44", as an editor for All-American Publications. Initially working as assistant for Sheldon Mayer on comic book titles like Mutt & Jeff, Funny Stuff, Funny Folks, and Leave It to Binky, he became one of the two editors for its humor titles along with Bernie Breslauer, he was promoted to full editor on all humor titles in 1949 following Breslauer's illness and remained there until his death in 1963. He also took over the romance books shortly before his death in 1963.

Nadle also wrote scripts for radio and television, and (under the joint pseudonym "Bob Lawrence", which he shared with cartoonist Bob Oksner) produced the comic strip version of the situation comedy I Love Lucy. As well, he served as Robert Lewis May's ghost writer on the Rudolph the Red-Nosed Reindeer comic strip, and created the character "Yankee Doodle Dandy" (although, due to Nadle's sudden death, the character went unpublished until Grant Morrison repurposed him in 1992).

== Allegations of misconduct ==
Fellow editor George Kashdan said that Nadle "paid himself for stories that did not exist", and that prior to audits, Nadle "would take an old script and change the title page to the title of the new story that he bought for himself".

Similarly, artist John Romita alleged that Nadle solicited kickbacks from artists from whom he would then commission stories, in order to pay his gambling debts.

Bob Oksner likewise stated that Nadle solicited kickbacks, and described how, when he was writing and drawing The Adventures of Jerry Lewis, Nadle persuaded him to allow his writing credit (and thus payment) to be transferred to another cartoonist who "was in great debt to DC"; in reality, Nadle was keeping the money, and when this was discovered after Nadle's death, Oksner was nearly fired.

Bob Haney called Nadle "a horse player with a heart problem".

Craig Shutt has noted that Nadle participated in the practice of "redo(ing) stories", whereby a comic would "replicate major plot points or complete storylines [of earlier comics], often using the same scenes if not the exact pacing".

== Bibliography ==
As editor unless otherwise noted:

=== DC Comics ===
- The Adventures of Bob Hope #1–86 (1950–1964)
- The Adventures of Dean Martin and Jerry Lewis #1–40 (1952–1957)
- The Adventures of Jerry Lewis #41–82 (1957–1964)
- The Adventures of Ozzie & Harriet #1–5 (1949–1950)
- Animal Antics #20–51 (1949–1954)
- Buzzy #28–77 (1949–1958)
- Comic Cavalcade #30–63 (1948–1954)
- A Date with Judy #13–79 (1949–1960)
- The Dodo and the Frog #80–92 (1954–1957)
- Everything Happens to Harvey #1–7 (1953–1954)
- Falling in Love #61–67 (1963–1964)
- Flippity & Flop #1–47 (1951–1960)
- The Fox and the Crow #1–85 (1951–1964)
- Funny Folks #1–60 (1946–1954)
- Funny Stuff #1–79 (1944–1954)
- Girls' Love Stories #97–103 (1963–1964)
- Girls' Romances #94–100 (1963–1964)
- Heart Throbs #85–89 (1963–1964)
- Here's Howie #1–18 (1952–1954)
- It's Gametime #1–4 (1955–1956)
- Jackie Gleason and the Honeymooners #1–12 (1956–1958)
- Leading Comics #36–77 (1949–1955)
- Leave It to Binky #1–60 (1948–1958)
- The Many Loves of Dobie Gillis #1–24 (1960–1964)
- Miss Beverly Hills of Hollywood #1–9 (1949–1950)
- Miss Melody Lane of Broadway #1–3 (1950)
- Mutt & Jeff #7–103 (1943–1958)
- Nutsy Squirrel #61–72 (1954–1957)
- Pat Boone #1–5 (1959–1960)
- Peter Panda #1–31 (1953–1958)
- Peter Porkchops #1–62 (1949–1960)
- The Raccoon Kids #52–64 (1954–1957)
- Real Screen Comics #23–128 (1949–1959)
- Rudolph the Red-Nosed Reindeer #1–13 (1950–1962)
- Sergeant Bilko #1–18 (1957–1960)
- Sgt. Bilko's Pvt. Doberman #1–11 (1958–1960)
- Secret Hearts #90–95 (1963–1964)
- Scribbly #1–15 (1948–1952)
- Sugar and Spike #1–52 (1956–1964)
- The Three Mouseketeers #1–26 (1956–1960)
- TV Screen Cartoons #129–138 (1959–1961)
- Young Love #39–43 (1963–1964)
- Young Romance #125–129 (1963–1964)

== Personal life ==
Nadle's brother was cartoonist Martin Naydel, perhaps best known as the creator of the Jumble.
