= Native Americans in popular culture =

Pop culture depictions; often as "noble savages"

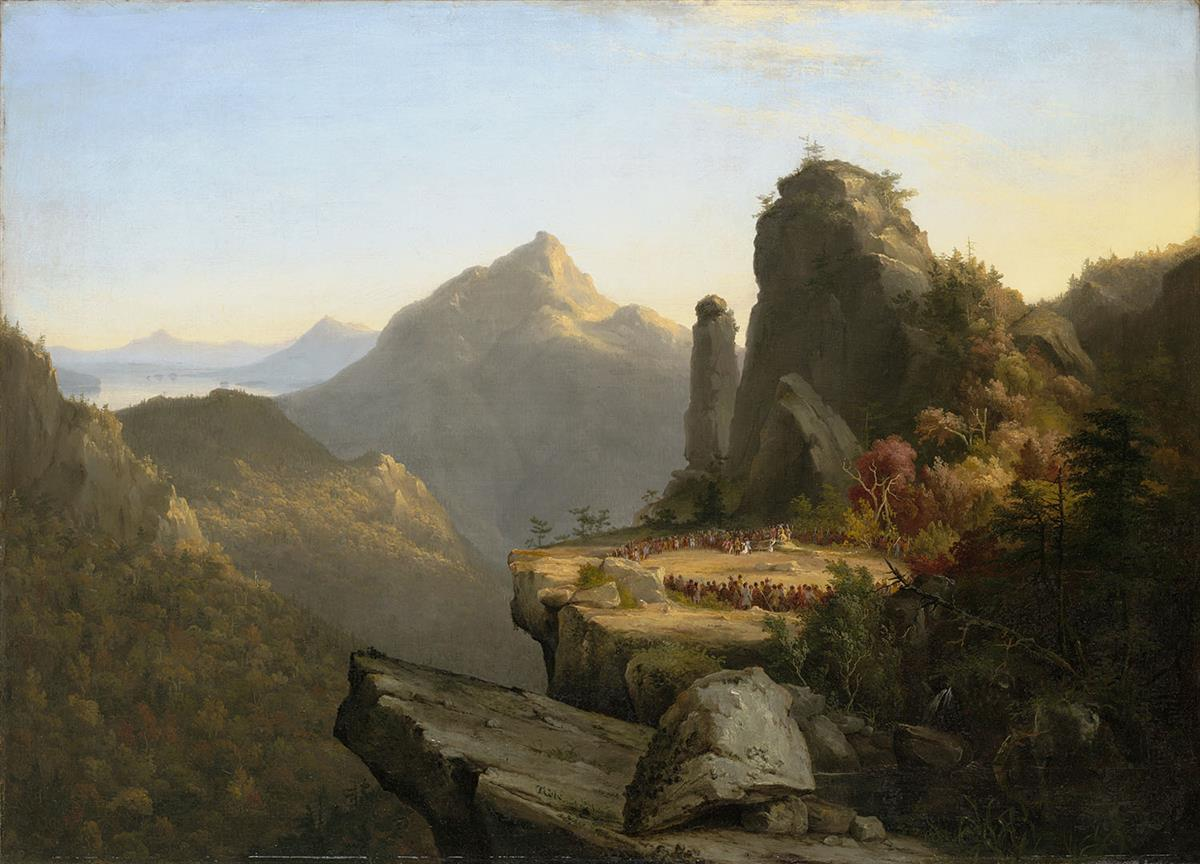
Cora Kneeling at the Feet of Tamenund, by Thomas Cole (1827) based on the 1826 novel The Last of the Mohicans

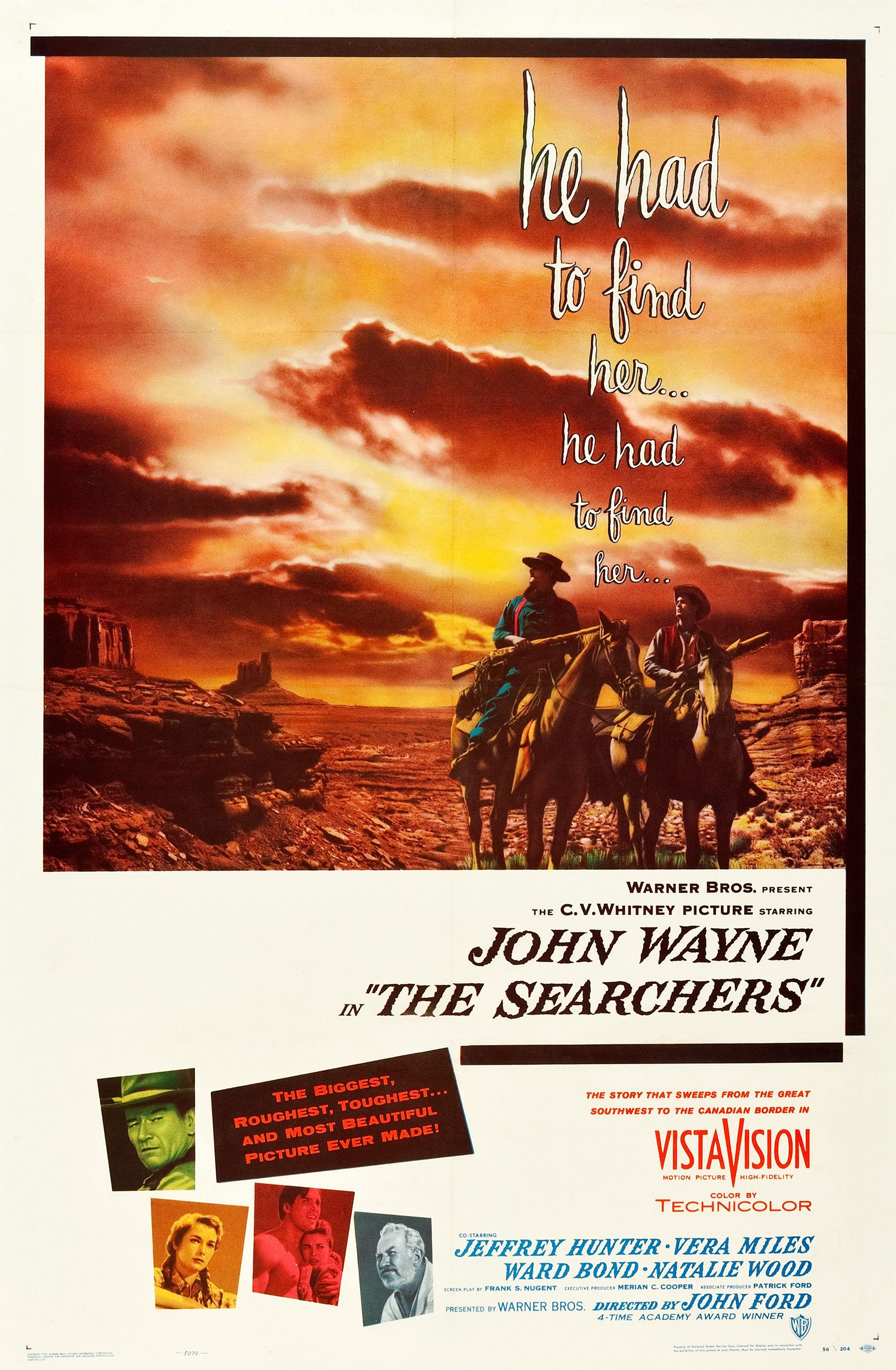
The searchers (1956) is about Ethan Edwards (played by John Wayne) who returns home to Texas after the end of the American Civil War, but when members of his brother's family are killed or abducted by Comanches, he vows to track down the surviving relatives and bring them home.

The portrayal of Indigenous people of the Americas in popular culture has oscillated between the fascination with the noble savage who lives in harmony with nature, and the stereotype of the uncivilized Red Indian of the traditional Western genre. The common depiction of American Indians and their relationship with European colonists has however changed over time.

== History ==
In 1851, Charles Dickens wrote a scathingly sarcastic review in his weekly magazine, Household Words, of painter George Catlin's show of American Indians when it visited England. In his essay, entitled The Noble Savage, Dickens expressed repugnance for Indians and their way of life, recommending that they ought to be "civilized out of existence". (Dickens' essay refers to Dryden's use of the term, not to Rousseau.) Dickens' scorn for those unnamed individuals, who, like Catlin, he alleged, misguidedly exalted the so-called "noble savage", was limitless. In reality, Dickens maintained, Indians were dirty, cruel, and constantly fighting among themselves. Dickens' satire on Catlin and others like him who might find something to admire in the American Indians or African bushmen is a notable turning point in the history of the use of the phrase.

Eastern European-produced Westerns were popular in Communist Eastern European countries, and were a particular favorite of Joseph Stalin. "Red Western" or "Ostern" films usually portrayed the American Indians sympathetically, as oppressed people fighting for their rights, in contrast to American Westerns of the time, which frequently portrayed the Indians as villains.

The concept of Native Americans living in harmony with nature was taken up in the 1960s by the hippie subculture and played a certain role in the formative phase of the environmentalist movement. The so-called Legend of the Rainbow Warriors, an alleged Hopi prophecy foretelling environmental activism, became popular, with most proponents unaware that the story is untrue, written as part of an evangelical Christian tract, and an attempt to destroy traditional Native religions.

In the US cultural mainstream, negative depiction of Native Americans came to be seen as racist in the 1980s, as reflected in the production of western films emphasizing the "noble savage" such as Dances with Wolves (1990).

== Comics ==
Native American characters in comic books and comic strips include Akwas, a comic strip about Native Americans created by Mike Roy, and Super-Chief, an Indian superhero created for DC Comics. In the 1990s, DC Comics superhero Hawkman (Katar Hol) was depicted as being the son of a Thanagarian man and a Native American woman named Naomi Carter.

Marvel Comics features many Native American superheroes including Thunderbird (John Proudstar), Warpath, Shaman, Talisman, Forge, Danielle Moonstar, and Echo.

Italian comic books featuring Tex Willer prominently feature Native Americans in their pilota, starring from the first story, "Il totem misterioso" (lit. 'The mysterious totem').

European comics of the mid 20th century usually ridiculed Indians as goofy comedic characters. Examples include Little Plum, Oumpah-pah, and Big Chief Keen-Eyed Mole.

== Music ==
Since the turn of the century, stereotypical "heroic Indian braves" and their "devoted squaws" [sic] have been the subject of popular songs by non-Natives. Early examples include "Red Wing" and "Cherokee Maiden" by Bob Wills. Other songs with these stereotypes include "Running Bear" by the Big Bopper, "Apache" by the Shadows, and "Wig-Wam Bam" by the Sweet.

In contrast, Native American and First Nations artists have released their own songs about their people, ancestors, and experiences. These include "Wovoka" by Redbone, "The Land is Your Mother" by Floyd Red Crow Westerman (Sisseton-Wapheton Dakota) and "Oil 4 Blood" by Frank Waln (Sicangu Lakota), among many others.

Since the 1980s, songs by non-Native musicians have drawn upon literature written by Native Americans to condemn the injustices committed by white people. Examples include "Run to the Hills" by Iron Maiden and "Creek Mary's Blood" by Nightwish which includes vocals from Native American musician John Two-Hawks.

== Film ==
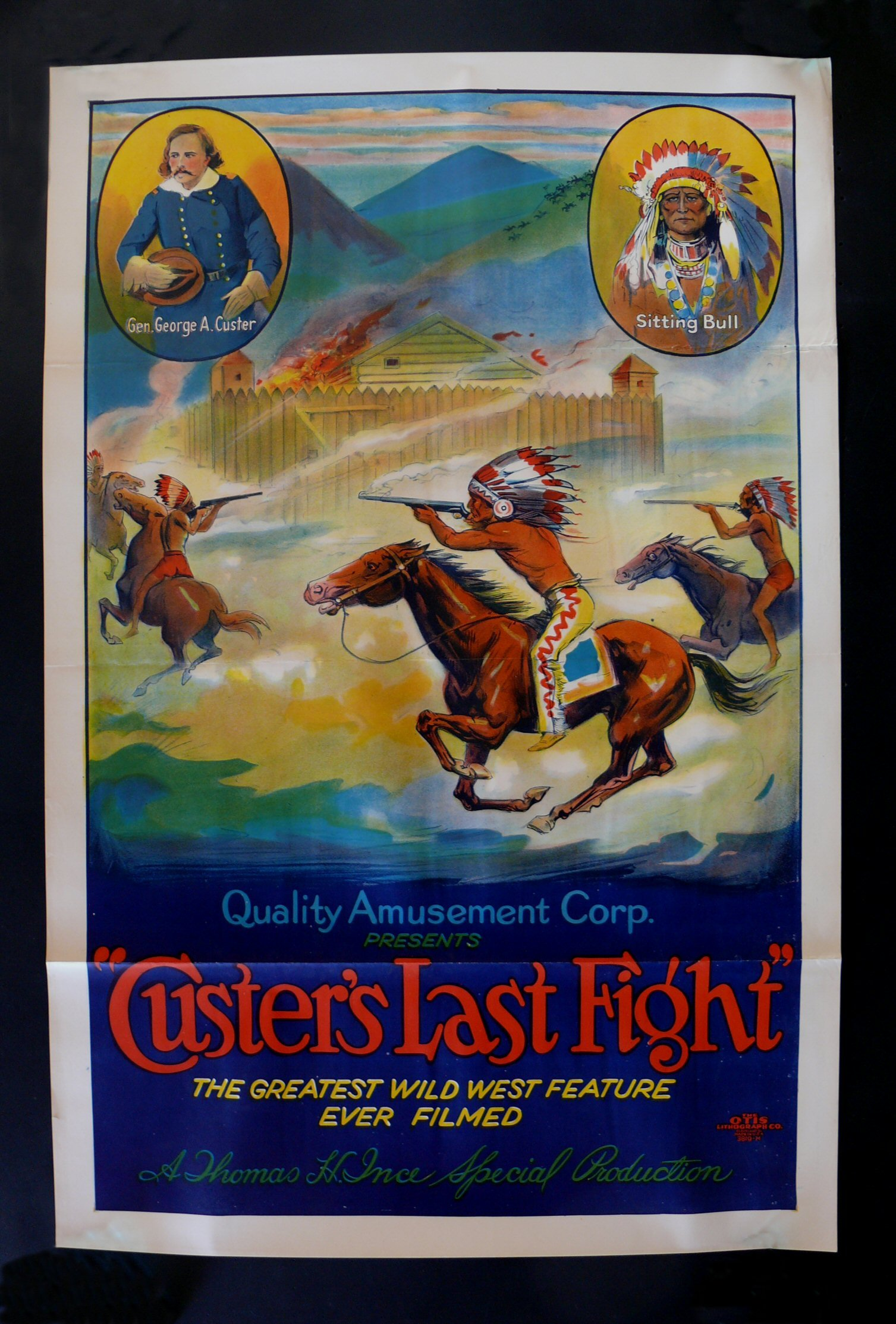
Custer's Last Fight (1912)

In films such as Northwest Passage (1940), Native Americans are the villains, attacking White settlers, often at the instigation of unscrupulous White men. But there are many Hollywood films that offer a more sympathetic picture. Most of the John Ford Westerns show respect toward American Indians, and they are the heroes of such major films as Broken Arrow (1950) and Dances With Wolves (1990). Probably the most famous "Indian" in American popular media is the Lone Ranger's sidekick, Tonto, most famously portrayed by Native American actor Jay Silverheels.

== Literature ==
Native Americans assumed a central role in American literary themes between the 1820s and 1830s. In this period, they were often portrayed by white authors as the soon-to-be extinct originators of an American nationhood that is to be assumed by white Americans. During the American revolution, The Indigenous identity was often presented as something that could be used by the American patriots to distinguish themselves from the British loyalists, as in organizations such as Fraternal Order of Red Men or the Sons of Liberty at the Boston Tea Party. Other works in what scholars call the "Indian hater" genre glorified white frontier settlers on genocidal rampages and provided literary justification for Indian removal policy of the period. Some white authors in this period like John Neal challenged these trends. His novel Logan (1822) challenged racial boundaries between white Americans and Native Americans. His short story "David Whicher" (1832) reacted to the Indian Removal Act of 1830, and popular literature that supported it by exploring peaceful multiethnic coexistence in the US. The Indian hater genre first appeared in the 1820s and died out by the 1850s.

Rick, the protagonist of Simon Spurrier's novel, The Culled (2006, book 1 of The Afterblight Chronicles), belongs to the Haudenosaunee people and is guided through crises by the sachem. Another character, named Hiawatha, saves Rick's life and advises him the Tadodaho have said Rick and Hiawatha are aligned.

Throughout Sherman Alexie's poem, "How to Write the Great American Indian Novel" he states that all of the Indians must have tragic noses, eyes, and arms. Their hands and fingers must be tragic when they reach for tragic food. Natives are portrayed with tragic features because it resembles their tragic history. "The hero must be a half-breed, half white and half Indian, preferably from a horse culture. He should often weep alone. That is mandatory". Males are depicted as being the strong warriors. Males are also often depicted as wearing headdresses in popular culture. "If the hero is an Indian women, she is beautiful. She must be slender and in love with a white man". In popular culture women are depicted in a sexualized form. Women are depicted as not portraying strength. However, Native American women are very strong. They picked berries and looked after the kids.

In Vine DeLoria's story, "Indian Humor" he states that "It has always been a great disappointment to Indian People that the humorous side of Indian life has not been mentioned by professed experts on Indian affairs".

== Video games ==
Not unlike other media, the history of video games includes many characters who embody sterotypical roles and traits. Oregon Trail is an early example of this problematic depiction. However, as video games have evolved more nuanced representation can be found, including games like Assassin's Creed 3 and Never Alone, where developers worked with Native communities on the depictions of their people. In addition to games by AAA studios, a number of indie games by Native American people can be found, including When Rivers Were Trails and Hill Agency: Purity/Decay.

- Mortal Kombat 3 (1995) included Native American fighter Nightwolf in the character pool
- American Conquest (2003) depicts various native tribes and empires during the colonisation of the Americas
- Red Dead Revolver (2004) features a half Native American protagonist, Red Harlow
- Age of Empires III (2005) includes Native American nations, three of which were made playable in Age of Empires III: The WarChiefs expansion
- Gun (2005) features an Apache protagonist, Cole White, who is revealed to have been adopted as a baby by his stepfather after the rest of his tribe was massacred
- Prey (2006) features a Cherokee protagonist, Tommy, who is voiced by Indigenous actor Michael Greyeyes
- Fallout: New Vegas (2010), in the Honest Hearts DLC, features three fictional Native American tribes in a post-apocalyptic Zion National Park, Utah
- Red Dead Redemption (2010), includes a number of Native NPCs, including members of the Dutch Van Der Linde gang and Nastas, who aids the player/protagonist
- Assassin's Creed III (2012) features a half English, half Mohawk Native American named Ratonhnhaké:ton
- Grand Theft Auto V (2013) includes an NPC, Lamar Davis, who claims to be of Apache descent.
- Infamous: Second Son (2014) features protagonist Delsin Rowe and his brother Reggie, who are members of a fictional Native American tribe called the Akomish
- Assassin's Creed: Rogue (2014) includes an Abenaki Assassin named Kesegowaase is a minor antagonist, and players encounter members of the Oneida nation
- Red Dead Redemption 2 (2018) includes the fictional Wapiti Indians led by Rains Fall and including members such as his son Eagle Flies. Additionally, a Van der Linde gang member and major character in the game Charles Smith is a half-Native American

== See also ==
- List of fictional Native Americans
- Native Americans in German popular culture
- Show Indians
- Great Spirit
- Native American warrior
- Native Americans in children's literature
- Portrayal of Native Americans in film
- Native American hobbyism in Germany
