= Stan Goldberg =

American comics artist (1932–2014)

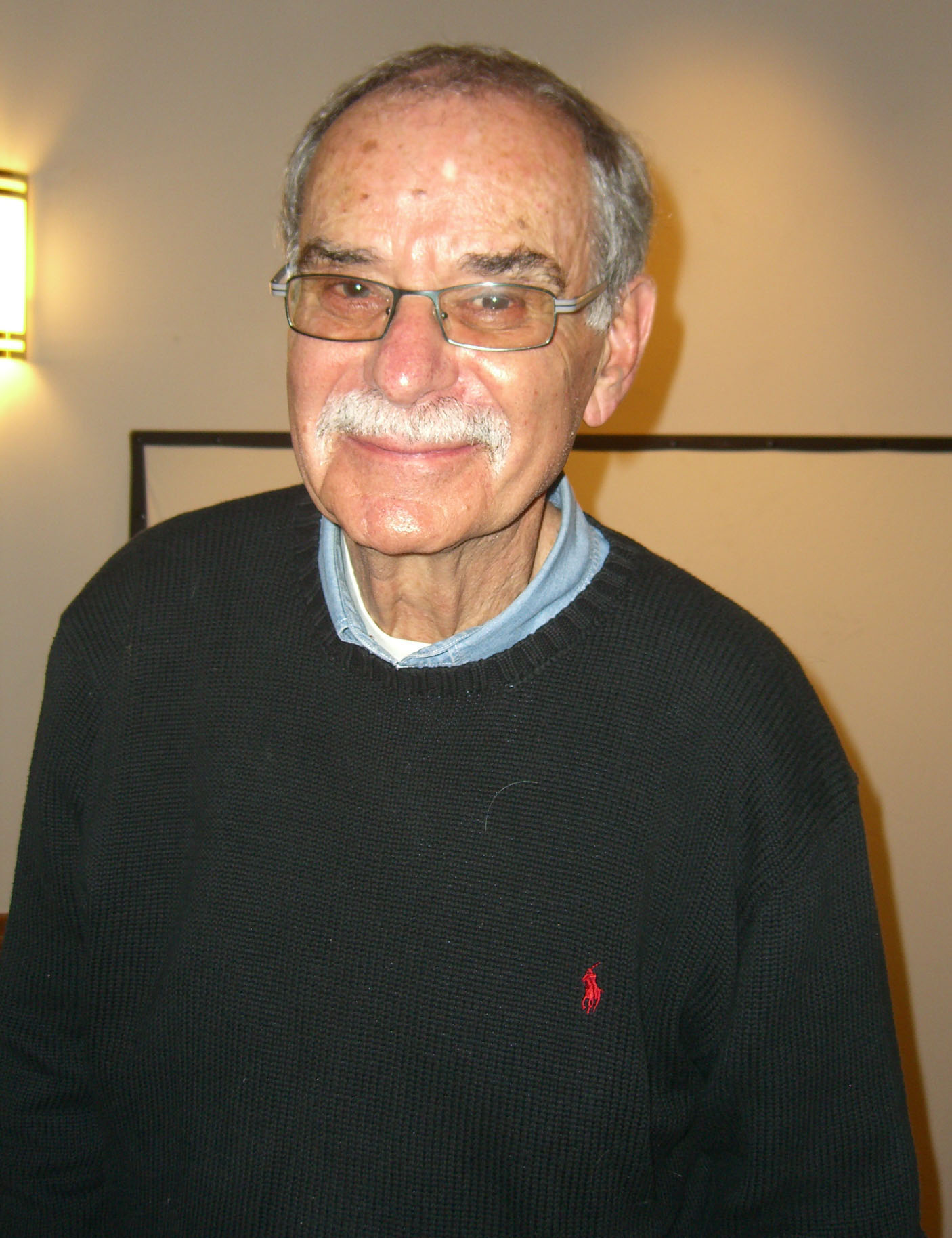
- Goldberg at the Big Apple Con on November 14, 2008
- Born: May 5, 1932 New York City, U.S.
- Died: August 31, 2014 (aged 82) New York City, U.S.
- Areas: Penciller, Inker, Colourist
- Pseudonym: Stan G.
- Awards: Inkpot Award (1994)

Stan Goldberg (May 5, 1932 – August 31, 2014) was an American comic book artist, best known for his work with Archie Comics and as a Marvel Comics colorist who in the 1960s helped design the original color schemes of Spider-Man, the Fantastic Four and other major characters. He was inducted into the National Cartoonists Society Hall of Fame in 2011.

== Early life ==
Goldberg was born in The Bronx, New York City, on May 5, 1932. He graduated from the School of Industrial Art high school in Manhattan.

== Career ==
In 1949, when "I think I just turned 17 or I was still 16 at the time, I don't remember," Goldberg began work in the comics field as a staff colorist for Marvel's 1940s predecessor, Timely Comics, working under Jon D'Agostino. Two years later, Goldberg became the coloring-department manager. In that capacity, he said, he "colored not just interiors, but also every cover the rest of the decade" for Timely's successor, Atlas Comics. During this time, he took evening classes at the School of Visual Arts, where Jerry Robinson, whose war-comics stories Goldberg was coloring, was one of the instructors.

In addition to coloring, Goldberg drew stories for Atlas' horror comics (including as early as "The Cave of Death" in Marvel Tales #109, Oct. 1952) and other titles. As he recalled in the mid-2000s of the Atlas staff:

I was in the Bullpen with a lot of well-known artists who worked up there at that time. We had our Bullpen up there until about 1958 or '59. [sic; the Bullpen staff was let go in 1957] The guys ... who actually worked nine-to-five and put in a regular day, and not the freelance guys who'd come in a drop off their work ... were almost a hall of fame group of people. There was John Severin. Bill Everett. Carl Burgos. There was the all-time great Joe Maneely.... We all worked together, all the colorists and correction guys, the letterers and artists. ... We had a great time.

=== The Silver Age ===
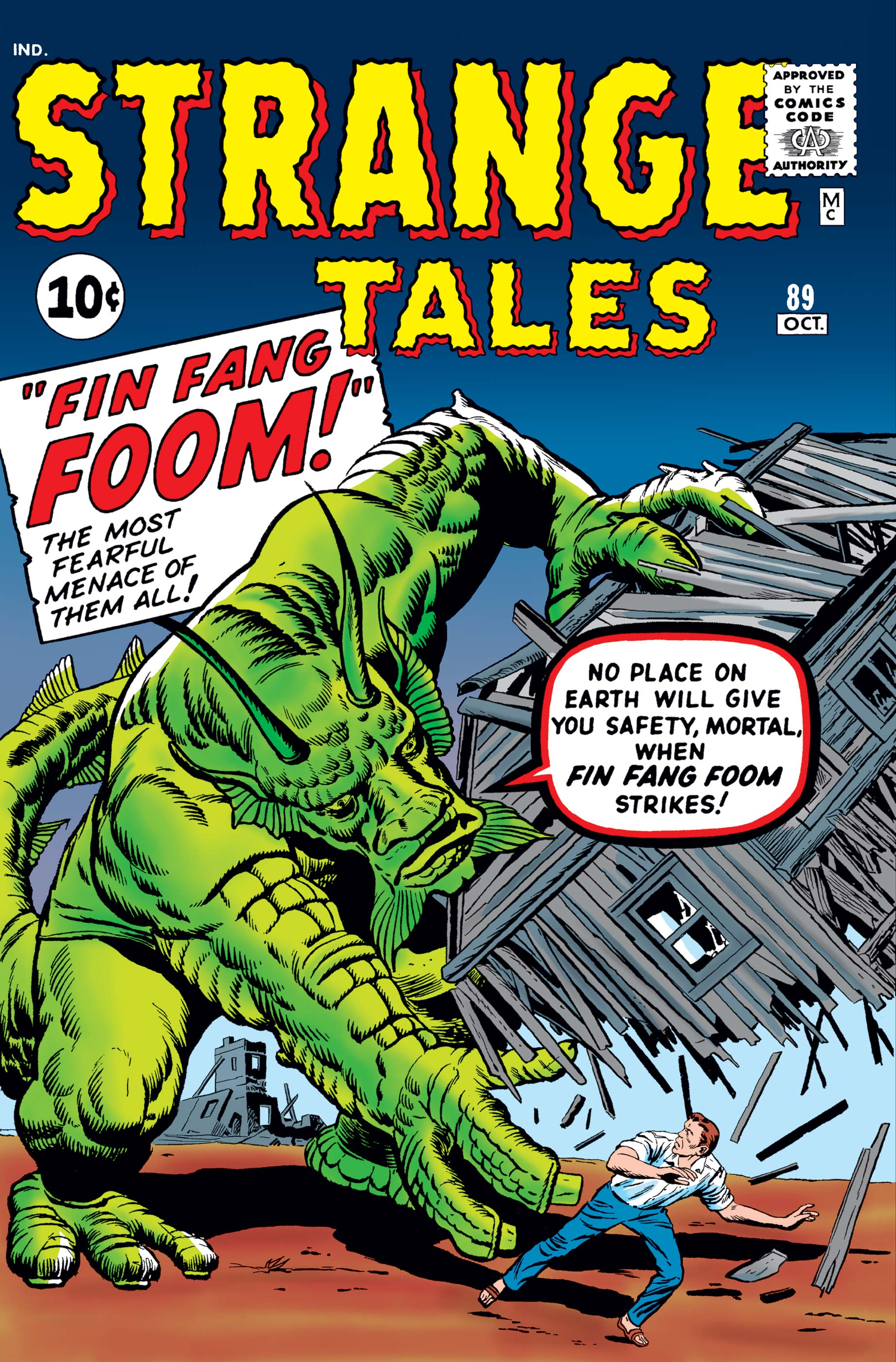
Fin Fang Foom on the cover of Strange Tales #89, colors by Goldberg

Goldberg went freelance in 1958, and also enrolled again in the School of Visual Arts, this time to study TV storyboarding and where one instructor was influential Batman artist Jerry Robinson. As Atlas segued into Marvel, Goldberg began freelance-coloring the company's comic books through the mid-1960s, working with such artists as Steve Ditko and Jack Kirby to create the color designs for such characters as Spider-Man, the Fantastic Four, the Hulk and others during what historians call the Silver Age of comic books. Other Marvel colorists of that era — all of whom, like Goldberg, worked uncredited at that time — included George Roussos, Marie Severin, and, on his own work only, writer-artist Jim Steranko.

Goldberg recalled in the mid-2000s that "Stan [Lee, Marvel's editor-in-chief] was writing Fantastic Four, The Amazing Spider-Man and all those books. I was doing the initial coloring on all those books; I was creating the color schemes on all those characters."

As a penciler and inker, Goldberg found his niche drawing in the house style established by Dan DeCarlo for the various Marvel humor titles starring teens and career girls. After starting with Kathy the Teenage Tornado, Goldberg moved on to the long-running, slapsticky Millie the Model. Goldberg would also draw drew her in a more serious style during Millie's 1963-67 iteration as a romantic-adventure star, and likewise exhibited a less-cartoony style on the teen romantic comedy series Patsy Walker. He would eventually co-plot these humor stories with writer-editor Lee.

Some Marvel humor stories with art credited to Sol Brodsky may have been Goldberg's work. As comics historian Mark Evanier notes:

...there were quite a few issues of Millie the Model and other teen comics signed by Sol Brodsky or 'Solly B.' Brodsky was the firm's production manager and an occasional inker, and he did ink a few of the Millie stories that bear his credit. But they were all at least pencilled by Stan Goldberg. At the time, Stan was doing occasional work for the Archie Comics people, and they didn't like to see their artists drawing in that style for other publishers. So when Stan drew teen comics for Marvel, they put Brodsky's name on them in the hope that the Archie editors wouldn't know it was him.

=== Archie Comics and afterward ===
Goldberg stopped freelancing for Marvel in 1969, and for three years drew the DC Comics teen titles Date with Debbi, Swing with Scooter and Leave It to Binky. Shortly afterward he began a decades-long association with Archie Comics, joining Dan DeCarlo, Henry Scarpelli and other artists in drawing the house-style misadventures of Archie, Betty, Veronica, Jughead, Reggie and the rest of the Riverdale High teens. Goldberg's work has appeared across the line, including in the flagship series, Archie — for which Goldberg has been the primary artist from at least the mid-1990s through mid-2006 — as well as in issues of Archie and Me, Betty, Betty and Me, Everything's Archie, Life with Archie, Archie's Pals 'n' Gals, Archie at Riverdale High, Laugh, Pep Comics, Sabrina The Teenage Witch, the 1986 educational one-shot Archie's Ham Radio Adventure, and the 1990 TV movie tie-in To Riverdale and Back Again.

Goldberg drew the Archie Sunday newspaper comic strip for a time beginning in 1975. In 1994, Goldberg was chosen to pencil Archie Comics' portion of the intercompany crossover Archie Meets the Punisher, a one-shot in which the gritty, homicidal Marvel vigilante finds himself pursuing an Archie Andrews look-alike into bucolic Riverdale. The following year, he drew the Archie gang for the cover of the Long Island weekly newspaper Dan's Papers. He penciled a six-page Betty story, "I'll Take Manhattan", published August 17, 2003, in The New York Times' Fashion of the Times magazine supplement.

Goldberg ended his nearly 40-year relationship with Archie with two three-part, alternate-future stories in Archie #600-605 (Oct. 2009 - March 2010), "Archie Marries Veronica" and "Archie Marries Betty", followed by some additional, final work including two pages of a flashback sequence in the 25-page "Love Finds Archie Andrews: Archie Loves Betty" in the comics magazine Life With Archie #1 (Sept. 2010), and the cover of, and an 11-page story in, Tales from Riverdale Digest #39 (Oct. 2010).

Goldberg's other late-career comics work includes issues of DC's talking animal superhero series Captain Carrot and His Amazing Zoo Crew in the early 1980s, and the Jewish-themed children's comic book Mendy and the Golem in 2003. In the 2010s, he drew variant covers for Marvel's FF #1 (May 2011) and IDW Publishing's superhero-humor comic Love and Capes: Ever After #5 (June 2011), as well as the Archie Comics parody story "Everything's Bartchie!" in Bongo Comics' Simpsons Comics #183 (Oct. 2011). Beginning in 2012, he began illustrating children's graphic novels starring Nancy Drew and The Three Stooges for the comics publisher Papercutz. That year he also drew an anti-bullying educational comic, Rise Above, for the organization Rise Above Social Issues.

In 2010, IDW released the 160-page hardcover collection Archie: The Best of Stan Goldberg, with a new Goldberg cover.

His posthumously published new work includes an Archie Comics-styled Spider-Man story, "That Parker Boy", written by Tom DeFalco and inked by Scott Hanna, in Marvel's 75th Anniversary Special, scheduled for publication in October 2014.

=== Other work ===
In addition to comic-book illustration and coloring, Goldberg drew gag cartoons for men's magazines and did advertising art including a billboard for No-Cal Soda.

== Awards and recognition ==
Goldberg won a Comic-Con International Inkpot Award in 1994. At that comic book convention in 2003, he was the subject of the panel "Spotlight on Stan Goldberg".

Goldberg was the National Cartoonists Society Hall of Fame inductee for 2011, which is accompanied by the organization's Gold Key Award, presented to Goldberg on May 26, 2012.

== Personal life ==
Goldberg and his wife, Pauline Mirsky, who married in the early 1960s, had homes in the Beechhurst neighborhood of Queens, New York City, and in Hampton Bays, New York, on Long Island. They have two sons: Stephen, an advertising agency media director, and Bennett, a graphic designer with whom Goldberg has worked on book projects. Another child, daughter Heidi, was murdered in 1984 at age 19. Afterward the Goldbergs became involved with the organization Parents of Murdered Children.

Goldberg suffered injuries in an automobile accident in 2013, but made a full recovery. He died at Calvary Hospital in The Bronx at the age of 82 on August 31, 2014, the result of a stroke he had suffered two weeks prior.
