= This Funny World =

American newspaper cartoon panel (1944-1985)

- First published in Collier's, this cartoon by Tom Hudson was reprinted by the McNaught Syndicate in This Funny World (July 30, 1949).
- Author(s): numerous
- Current status/schedule: Concluded daily & Sunday gag panel
- Launch date: March 6, 1944
- End date: 1985
- Syndicate(s): McNaught Syndicate
- Genre(s): humor

This Funny World was a gag cartoon panel syndicated to newspapers by the McNaught Syndicate from March 6, 1944, to 1985.

In addition to original cartoons, the series featured numerous reprints of cartoons previously published in leading magazines, including The American Magazine, American Legion Magazine, Collier's, Look, True and Woman's Home Companion.

== Cartoonists ==
The single-panel series featured the cartoons of Stan and Jan Berenstain, Henry Boltinoff, Dick Cavalli, Stan Fine, Tom Hudson, Reamer Keller, Ted Key, Don Orehek, B. Tobey, Mort Walker, Pete Wyma and many others.

On Wednesday, August 16, 1944, a federal trademark registration was filed for This Funny World by the McNaught Syndicate with the listed correspondent Panitch, Schwarze, Jacobs & Nadel at 2000 Market Street in Philadelphia.

== See also ==
- 1000 Jokes
- Laff-a-Day
