= Dave Breger =

American cartoonist (1908–1970)

David Breger
- Born: April 16, 1908
- Died: January 16, 1970 (aged 61)
- Education: Northwestern University
- Occupation: Cartoonist
- Military career
- Allegiance: United States
- Branch: United States Army
- Service years: 1941-1945
- Unit: Special Services division
- Conflicts: World War II

Irving David Breger (April 15, 1908 – January 16, 1970) was an American cartoonist who created the syndicated Mister Breger (1945–1970), a gag panel series and Sunday comic strip known earlier as Private Breger and G.I. Joe. The series led to widespread usage of the term "G.I. Joe" during World War II and later. Dave Breger was his signature and the byline on his books. During World War II, his cartoons were signed Sgt. Dave Breger.

== Early life ==
Growing up in Chicago, where he was born of native Russian parents, butcher Benjamin Breger and Sophie Passin Breger, only a few weeks after they arrived in the United States from Ukraine. As a youth, Breger had encounters with the local gangsters while working at his father's sausage factory. In 1926, he acquired his high school diploma from Crane Technical School, where he drew cartoons signed Irving Breger for the school paper. He studied architectural engineering at the University of Illinois and then transferred to Northwestern University, where he edited the campus humor magazine, Purple Parrot, while studying pre-med and psychology. He had no schooling in art or cartooning, and his college cartoons were drawn in a style similar to John Held, Jr.

Graduating from Northwestern in 1931 with a degree in abnormal psychology, he spent a year traveling the world, visiting Russia and Africa; during that period he sold cartoons to the German magazine, Lustige Blätter. He returned to Chicago and the sausage stockyard, rising to the position of office manager of his father's firm, where he devised the company slogan, "Our Wurst Is the Best". His first marriage, with fashion model Evelyn Breger, lasted five years.

In 1937, after receiving a $30 check from The Saturday Evening Post, Breger arrived in New York and began freelancing to Collier's, Parade, This Week, Esquire, Click and The New Yorker.

== World War II ==
Dave Breger's World War II, Private Breger postcard #306. Caption: "That soldier's here, Sir, about a new paratrooper uniform to deceive the enemy."

Early in 1941, he was drafted into the United States Army and sent to Camp Livingston in Louisiana, where he repaired trucks. He drew at night in the bakery or while sitting in a truck with netting overhead to keep the bugs away. The Saturday Evening Post, under the heading Private Breger, began publishing these cartoons as a series starting August 30, 1941. The Army became aware of his talent and transferred him to the Special Services Division in New York, where he married Brooklyn-born art agent Dorathy Lewis on January 9, 1942. In the early spring of 1942, he was assigned to the New York staff of Yank, the Army Weekly.

Yank wanted Breger to do cartoons like those in The Saturday Evening Post, but the editors asked him to devise a new title. He came up with the title G.I. Joe from the military term "Government Issue", and the character's full name was Joe Trooper. His G.I. Joe cartoon series began in the first issue of Yank (June 17, 1942). That summer, Breger arrived in the UK in 1942 as one of the first two Yank correspondents, covering the American military in England as a photo-journalist, while also producing his weekly G.I. Joe cartoon for Yank.

King Features Syndicate took an interest and signed Breger on to do a Private Breger (aka Private Breger Abroad) daily panel for domestic distribution. It was launched October 19, 1942 and continued until October 13, 1945.

He soon became one of the most famous and widely read of the World War II cartoonists, and the term "G.I. Joe" was adopted first by soldiers and then the homefront as the popular term for the American foot soldier. (Hasbro's G.I. Joe is a different character, developed by Larry Hama and trademarked as "G.I. Joe, A Real American Hero.") In 1942, Breger illustrated the sheet music for Irving Berlin's "I Left My Heart at the Stage Door Canteen".

== G.I. Jerry ==
Breger also produced G.I. Jerry, satirical cartoons about Hitler and others in the Nazi regime. There also was a postcard series titled Private Breger. The character remained a private throughout World War II, while Breger himself was promoted through the ranks to corporal, sergeant and eventually lieutenant. His August 25, 1945 cartoon was signed Lt. Dave Breger, indicating his final military rank. From 1943 to 1946, Private Breger was reprinted in David McKay's Ace Comics (1943–46) and Magic Comics (1945).

== Mister Breger ==
Dave Breger's Mister Breger (1945–1970) was originally Private Breger during WWII.

Returning to civilian life after World War II, Breger also had his character become a civilian. Private Breger was discharged, and on October 22, 1945, the title was altered from Private Breger to Mister Breger. The Mister Breger Sunday strip was added on February 3, 1946. Vacationers could write friends with the set of Mister Breger postcards, Mister Breger on Vacation. Recurring themes in the strips and panels included jail, weddings and Breger employed as a bank teller. In one cartoon, Breger predicted that since television showed so many old movies, the day would come when movie theaters would turn to vintage television for product. This prediction came true with the advent of such TV-based films as Mission: Impossible and Star Trek.

Mister Breger also received comic book reprints in The Katzenjammer Kids (1947), Popeye (1967), Beetle Bailey (1969) and Flint Comix and Entertainment (2009–10).

In 1946, Breger became a founding member of the National Cartoonists Society. Dave and Dorathy Breger settled in West Nyack, New York, where they had three children—Dee, Lois and Harry. They were, according to Breger, "all three artistic".

In the 1960s, Breger taught a cartooning course at New York University, developing his lesson plans into a book, How to Draw and Sell Cartoons (1966).

When Breger died in 1970, he was cremated at Ferncliff Cemetery in Hartsdale, New York. Mister Breger continued to run as a daily panel until March 21, 1970. The final Sunday was published the following day, two months after his death.

== Books ==
Between 1942 and 1951, Breger did five books collecting his Army cartoons. Private Breger in Britain (1944), published in London by Pilot Press Ltd., included an introductory discussion on Anglo-American humor between Breger and Michael Barsley. Squads, Write was a 1951 postcard book with 32 cards printed 6 1/2" × 11" on postcard quality paper.

In But That's Unprintable (1955) Breger wrote about newspaper and magazine taboos and illustrated his text with 135 unpublished cartoons by leading cartoonists, including Bo Brown, Milton Caniff, Irwin Caplan, Eric Ericson, Stan Fine, Rube Goldberg, Leo Garel, Don Flowers, Phil Interlandi, Reamer Keller, Fred Lundy, Jack Markow, Charles E. Martin, Fred Neher, Russell Patterson, Mort Walker and George Wolfe. The material is arranged in such chapters as bodily functions, clothing, death, mental illness, sex and words.

== Awards and exhibitions ==
Northwestern University honored him in 1946 with an Alumni Merit Award for distinguishing himself in his field of endeavor. An exhibition of Breger cartoons, WWII and Private Breger, was displayed at Syracuse University's Ernest S. Bird Library from February 28 to April 6, 1979.

Syracuse University Library's Special Collections Research Center has Breger's papers (more than 90 items of correspondence) plus 2,414 of his cartoons, including 377 of the World War II cartoons. There is also a collection at the Library of Congress.

== Bibliography ==
- Private Breger: His Adventures in an Army Camp. Rand McNally and Co., 1942. (Collects 'The Saturday Evening Post cartoons)
- Private Breger's War: His Adventures in Britain and at the Front. Random House, 1944.
- Private Breger in Britain. London: Pilot Press Ltd., 1944.
- Give Out: Songs of, by and for the Men in Service. Femack Company, 1942.
- The Original G.I. Joe (Private Breger). Garden City, New York: Blue Ribbon Books, 1945.
- Squads, Write! (1951)
- But That's Unprintable. Bantam Books, 1955.
- How to Draw and Sell Cartoons. G. P. Putnam's, 1966.

== See also ==
- George Baker
- Bill Mauldin

== Sources ==
- Strickler, Dave. Syndicated Comic Strips and Artists, 1924–1995: The Complete Index. Cambria, California: Comics Access, 1995. ISBN 0-9700077-0-1
