= Oksner =

Oksner is a surname. Notable people with the surname include:

- Bob Oksner (1916–2007), American comics artist
- Robert M. Oksner (1926–2017), American advertising executive
