= Columbia Features =

- Industry: Print syndication
- Founded: 1953; 72 years ago
- Defunct: 1994; 31 years ago
- Headquarters: (originally) New York City (later years) New Smyrna Beach, Florida, U.S.
- Key people: William H. Thomas, Robert Ferguson, Bruce Brown
- Products: Comic strips, Gag panels. Columns
- Owner: Robert Ferguson (1987–1992); Bruce Brown (1992–1994)

Columbia Features was a syndication service that operated from 1953 to 1994. Originally located in New York City, The syndicate specialized in comic strips based on licensed characters such as Smokey the Bear, Bat Masterson, and Nero Wolfe.

Notable Columbia Features comic strip creators included Murphy Anderson, Otto Binder, Henry Boltinoff, Jerry Grandenetti, France Herron, Fran Matera, Mike Roy, and Don Sherwood. Irene Corbally Kuhn, a pioneering female journalist, was a columnist for Columbia Features in the 1970s.

== History ==
One of Columbia's first strips was also one of its longest-running features: Jes' Smith by Johnny Pierotti, which ran from 1953 to 1973.

The syndicate debuted a number of strips in 1955, including the long-running The Mountain Boys by Paul Webb. Beginning in 1955 and continuing until his death in 1966, writer France Herron worked on a number of strips for Columbia Features. He started with the daily strips Davy Crockett, Frontiersman and Nero Wolfe — staying on the Davy Crockett strip until 1959, when he became the writer of the Rip Tide and Bat Masterson strips. Bat Masterson was illustrated by Howard Nostrand and Bob Powell. (Notably, Nostrand was assisted [on backgrounds] by future comic book superstar Neal Adams who had just graduated from the School of Industrial Arts; it was among his first professional art jobs.) The Davy Crockett strip, though not a success, was notable for the fact that Jack Kirby ghosted the art in the early months of 1956. Both Nero Wolfe and Rip Tide ran until 1972.

Columbia's Smokey the Bear strip, by "Wes Wood" (most likely the team of Paul S. Newman and Mo Gollub), only ran for three years, and is considered highly derivative of the much more popular strip Mark Trail.

Columbia Features' last big syndication success was with Henry Boltinoff's Stoker the Broker, which debuted in 1960 and was syndicated until 1985, although at some point it moved to the Washington Star Syndicate.

In 1968, Columbia syndicated 45 features to approximately 1,000 newspapers; at that point William H. Thomas was president of the company.

Joseph M. Boychuk was president of Columbia Features in 1980; Helen Staunton was an editor around that same time. The company had gotten out of the comic strip business by the 1980s, focusing instead on syndicating the work of its columnists.

Robert Ferguson, formerly managing editor of Tribune Media Services, acquired Columbia Features in 1987, selling it in 1992 to Bruce Brown, who retained Ferguson as editor.

By 1994 the syndicate's offices were located in New Smyrna Beach, Florida.

Editor & Publisher reported the company had gone out of business in 1994.

== Strips and panels ==
- Akwas by Mike Roy (1964–1965) — weekly strip with topper strip Indian Lore and Crafts
- Bannister Babies by Constance Bannister (1972) — thrice-weekly gag panel
- Bat Masterson (September 7, 1959–April 1960) written by France Herron and drawn by Howard Nostrand (Sept. 1959–Dec. 1959) and Bob Powell (Dec. 1959–April 1960), with color by Marie Severin
- Davy Crockett, Frontiersman (June 20, 1955 – 1959) originally by Jay McArdle, with France Herron, and later Jim Christiansen
- Helen Homemaker by Gean & Lloyd Birmingham (1968–1973) — weekly strip
- Hoo-Dunnit by Fred Lamb (1976) — gag panel
- Jes' Smith by Johnny Pierotti (1953–1973)
- The Mountain Boys by Paul Webb (c. 1955–c. 1975)
- Our Ever Changing World by Otto Binder and Murphy Anderson (1958–1960)
- Nero Wolfe (1955–1972) by France Herron (1955) & Mike Roy (1956–1957), Mike Peppe (1956–1957) Fran Matera (1957–1959), and Jim Christiansen (1957–1972)
- Rip Tide (1956–1972) by John Broome (1956–1957), France Herron (1959–1966), and Jerry Grandenetti
- Smokey the Bear by "Wes Wood" (Paul S. Newman and Mo Gollub) (June 16, 1957 – March 26, 1960)
- Stoker the Broker by Henry Boltinoff (1960–1985) — later distributed by the Washington Star Syndicate
- Will Chance (1958-1962) by Norman Miller, Jim Gordon, and Don Sherwood
