= Henry Boltinoff =

American cartoonist (1914–2001)

- Self-portrait
- Born: February 19, 1914 New York City, U.S.
- Died: April 26, 2001 (aged 87) Lake Worth, Florida, U.S.
- Area: Artist
- Notable works: Hocus-Focus; Stoker the Broker; National Periodicals humor features
- Awards: National Cartoonists Society's Humor Comic Book Award, 1970; NCS Newspaper Panel Cartoon Award, 1981; Inkpot Award, 2001

Henry Boltinoff (February 19, 1914 – April 26, 2001) was an American cartoonist who worked for both comic strips and comic books. He was a prolific cartoonist and drew many of the humor and filler strips that appeared in National Periodical comics from the 1940s through the 1960s.

== Career ==
=== Comic books ===
Born in New York City, Boltinoff created numerous humor features for DC Comics, where his brother Murray Boltinoff was an editor. His most prominent creation for DC was "Dover & Clover" which debuted in More Fun Comics #94 (Nov. 1943). Boltinoff's other features include "Abdul the Fire Eater", "Bebe", "Billy", "Buck Skinner", "Cap's Hobby Center", "Casey the Cop", "Charlie Cannonball", "Chief Hot Foot", "Cora the Carhop", "Dexter", "Doctor Floogle", "Doctor Rocket", "Elvin", "Freddie the Frogman", "Hamid the Hypnotist", "Homer", "Honey in Hollywood", "Hy the Spy", "Hy Wire", "Jail Jests", "Jerry the Jitterbug", "King Kale", "Lefty Looie", "Lem 'n' Lime", "Lionel and His Lions", "Little Pete", "Little Pocahontas", "Lucky", "The Magic Genie", "Moolah the Mystic", "No-Chance Charley", "Ollie", "On the Set", "Peg", "Peter Puptent", "Prehistoric Fun", "Professor Eureka", "Sagebrush Sam", "Shorty", "Stan", "Super-Turtle", "Tricksy the World's Greatest Stunt Man" and "Warden Willis". These were usually lettered by Gaspar Saladino. Boltinoff's final creation for DC was "Cap's Hobby Hints". In 1969, he became the writer of the Date with Debbi and Swing with Scooter titles.

=== Magazine cartoons ===
Boltinoff started doing magazine cartoons in the early forties. He contributed to all of the mid range magazines, such as Look, Collier's, The Saturday Evening Post, True, Liberty, The American Legion':, Sunday newspaper magazines such as This Week', Today, The American Weekly, Parade and almost every other general interest magazine, from The Progressive Farmer to The Ford Times. He also sold a large number of cartoons to special cartoon magazines, such as 1000 Jokes and Judge and Gags.For Judge he did a monthly one page feature identifying character types between 1944 and 1947 and for King Features' Pictorial Review he had a regular page of gags under the title "Gags and Gals". All in all he was one of the best selling cartoonists in the 1940s and into the 1950s. Even while doing his filler strips for DC, his cartoons kept appearing in magazines such as Boy's Life and many of the low rent Humorama titles.

=== Comic strips and panels ===
Boltinoff was a regular contributor to This and That (a daily cartoon panel from the George Matthew Adams syndicate), Nubbin (1970 - 1986), This Funny World (a daily cartoon panel from the McNaught syndicate) and Laff-A-Day (a daily cartoon panel from King Features). He also had his own panels: Woody Forrest (1960), Stoker the Broker (1960), and Hocus-Focus through 2001.

Hocus-Focus may have been Boltinoff's best-known work. The King Features Syndicate feature, which was started c. 1965 by Harold Kaufmann, includes two similar panels with six differences between them. It continues to run in over 300 newspapers.

== Awards ==
Henry Boltinoff received the National Cartoonists Society's Newspaper Panel Cartoon Award in 1981 and also received their Humor Comic Book Award for 1970. He received the Inkpot Award in 2001.

== Bibliography ==
=== DC Comics ===
- All Funny Comics #1–23 (Dover and Clover) (1943–1948)
- The Best of DC #45 (1984)
- Binky #77 (1971)
- Binky's Buddies #11–12 (1970)
- Date with Debbi #3–5, 14 (1969–1971)
- Detective Comics #158, 163, 165, 171 (Dover and Clover) (1950–1951)
- More Fun Comics #94–100, 102–127 (Dover and Clover) (1943–1947)
- Star Spangled Comics #23, 24, 96 (1943–1949)
- Superboy #83 (1960)
- Swing with Scooter #17–18, 29, 31 (1969–1970)
- World's Best Comics #1 (1941)
- World's Finest Comics #2–4, 12, 67 (1941–1953)

Preceded by Doug Crane	Swing with Scooter writer 1969–1970	Succeeded by John Albano
Preceded by n/a	Date with Debbi writer 1969–1971	Succeeded by John Albano
Preceded by Bill Hoest	National Cartoonists Society Division Awards Newspaper Panel Award recipient 1981	Succeeded by Jim Unger
