= Super-Hip =

Publication information
- Publisher: DC Comics
- First appearance: The Adventures of Bob Hope #95 (October–November 1965)
- Created by: Arnold Drake (writer); Bob Oksner (artist)

In-story information
- Alter ego: Tadwallader Jutefruce
- Abilities: Flight; Shapeshifting; Superhuman strength Wields a guitar that can control minds

Super-Hip (Tadwallader Jutefruce) is a fictional character that appeared in comic books published by DC Comics. He first appeared in The Adventures of Bob Hope #95 (October–November 1965), in a story written by Arnold Drake and drawn by Bob Oksner.

== Publication history ==
Super-Hip appeared regularly in The Adventures of Bob Hope from issue #95 until issue #107, where he only appears in the last two panels, and #109. He does not appear in #108.

Super-Hip's sole non-Bob Hope appearance in the Silver Age was in Doom Patrol vol. 1, #104 (June 1966), as a guest at the wedding of Elasti-Girl and Mento. The story was scripted by Arnold Drake.

In the modern era, Super-Hip makes a brief appearance in Batman: The Brave and the Bold #15 (March 2010).

He appeared in Doom Patrol #20 (March 2011). According to the events of the issue (wherein he grants succor to a recently deported Doom Patrol), he is an old friend of Cliff Steele, a.k.a. Robotman.

== Fictional character biography ==
Tadwallader Jutefruce (a spooneristic pun on "fruit juice") is the crew cut and bow tie-clad student at Benedict Arnold High School an educational facility whose "Faculty of Fear" is made up entirely of Universal Horror-style monsters, including principal Dr. Van Pyre, German-accented science teacher Heinrich von Wolfmann, and coach Franklin Stein.

Whenever Tad loses his temper (usually at the instigation of a prank by fellow students billionaire biker bully Badger Goldliver and his simple-minded stooge Doltish), he turns green, starts to spin like a tornado, and transforms into Super-Hip.

Super-Hip's outfit resembles a 1960s Carnaby Street Mod, complete with ruffled shirt, velvet jacket, and Chelsea boots with winged ankles that allow him to fly. He also magically acquires an electric guitar which causes whoever hears it to dance uncontrollably whenever he plays rock and roll, and he can change his form into virtually anything, limited only by his imagination.

Tad has no memory of his time as the obnoxious and egotistical "Sultan of Swingers", and the only ones who know of his secret identity are his Uncle Bob and his educated talking dog, Harvard-Harvard.

Super-Hip's battle cry is "Down with/Blech to Lawrence Welk!", as Welk's music has a kryptonite-like effect on him.
