= Lawrence Lariar =

American novelist

- Lawrence Lariar self-portrait (1959)
- Born: December 25, 1908 Brooklyn, New York City, New York, U.S.
- Died: October 12, 1981 (aged 72) Waterbury, Connecticut, U.S.
- Areas: Cartoonist, novelist, editor
- Pseudonyms: Michael Stark; Adam Knight; Marston la France
- Notable works: Best Cartoons of the Year series
- Spouse: Susan Mayer
- Children: 2

Lawrence Lariar (December 25, 1908 – October 12, 1981) was an American novelist, cartoonist and cartoon editor, known for his Best Cartoons of the Year series of cartoon collections. He wrote crime novels, sometimes using the pseudonyms Michael Stark, Adam Knight and Marston la France.

== Early career ==
Born in Brooklyn, Lariar studied illustration at the New York School of Fine and Applied Art but then switched to cartooning. After graduation, he teamed with two of his friends, and they started a cartoon agency, selling their own work under a dozen different pseudonyms.

In 1927, they moved the operation to Paris, selling to British magazines and Fleetway. Two years later, they were back in New York looking for work, as Lariar recalled, "To make a living, we did everything. We had a service for printers, drew cartoons for calendars, played messenger and did some of the first work for the slicks." They scored with a series of cartoon postcards that Boy Scouts could use to write home, selling more than a million cards in a direct-mail campaign.

From 1930 to 1938, working in an office on 45th Street, Lariar did freelance gag cartoons, comic strips and spot drawings, including political cartoons for the New York Journal American and pages for some of the earliest comic books. In 1938 he moved to California to work at Walt Disney Studios, including on the film Fantasia, but was dissatisfied with the factory approach of the work and quit after a short time. Lariar returned to New York, describing the experience as "my brief sojourn in the whimsey mill of Mickey Mouse".

== Liberty ==
In 1941, his Comicard Company in Roosevelt, New York, produced a set of postcards that soldiers could use to write home, similar to Dave Breger's line of Private Breger postcards also available during World War II. Beginning in 1942, Lariar was the cartoon editor of Liberty, where he started The Thropp Family, the first comic strip to run as a continuity in a national magazine. From 1943 to 1946, he was president of the American Society of Magazine Cartoonists. In 1953, he created Yankee Yiddish Cocktail Napkins, which featured cartoons illustrating puns on Yiddish words and expressions.

== Books ==
During the 1940s, Lariar began writing and published at least 16 books, including Careers in Cartooning (Dodd Mead). His Best Cartoons of the Year series ran from 1942 to 1971, featuring work by Stan Fine and other leading gag cartoonists. In 1961, Lariar interrupted the series to do The Best of Best Cartoons: 20th Anniversary Edition.

Lariar wrote at least nine mystery and crime novels, including four with his character Homer Bull. For Kill-Box (1946), he wrote as Michael Stark, his only novel under that name. Now mostly forgotten, this unusual novel, praised by John W. Campbell, had an Ace paperback edition in 1954 and was published in the UK as Run for Your Life! Anthony Boucher's mention of "atomic murder" in the cover blurb indicates Lariar's innovative locked room mystery premise: The killer rents an apartment beneath the victim, opens a box with radioactive materials and leaves. After the death of the victim in the overhead apartment, the killer returns and departs with the box.

== Personal life ==
In 1935, he married his agent, Susan Mayer, one of the first cartoon agents in the magazine gag panel field. They had two children.

For over a decade, starting in 1957, Lariar had an affair with Barbara Griffith, the mother of future cartoonist Bill Griffith. This later formed the basis of Bill Griffith's 2015 graphic novel Invisible Ink: My Mother’s Secret Love Affair with a Famous Cartoonist.
