= Stoker the Broker =

American comic strip by Henry Boltinoff

- Henry Boltinoff's Stoker the Broker (April 12, 1975)
- Author(s): Henry Boltinoff
- Current status/schedule: Concluded gag panel
- Launch date: September 7, 1959
- End date: 1985
- Syndicate(s): Columbia Features (1960–?); The Washington Star Syndicate (?)
- Genre(s): Humor, finance

Stoker the Broker is a cartoon gag panel by Henry Boltinoff which was distributed to newspapers from September 7, 1959, to 1985 by Columbia Features and the Washington Star Syndicate.

== Characters and stories ==
Working in a style somewhat similar to the cartoons of Hank Ketcham, the prolific Boltinoff drew his stockbroker Stoker as a swell-dressed, balding chap with a white mustache and a distinguished demeanor. He interacted with buyers, sellers and his wife. In one cartoon, Stoker was revealed to be a grandfather.

Designed with a narrow column width, the feature was formatted to fit on the financial pages of newspapers. Boltinoff sometimes used the same character in advertising cartoons.

== Awards ==
In 1981, Boltinoff received the National Cartoonists Society's Newspaper Panel Cartoon Award for his work on the cartoon series.
