= Gerda Gattel =

- Born: Gerda Hammerschlag; October 28, 1908 Lichtenstein, Saxony, Germany
- Died: May 14, 1993 (aged 84) Little Neck, Queens, New York, U.S.
- Area: Letterer
- Awards: Shazam Award, 1973

Gerda Gattel (October 28, 1908 – May 14, 1993) was a comic book creator who worked as a letterer, and later as a proofreader, most notably for DC Comics.

Gattel worked as a letterer in the production department of Marvel Comics' predecessor Timely Comics from 1947 to 1952. Throughout the balance of the 1950s she worked in other production capacities, including proofreader and production manager. Moving to National Periodical Publications (DC Comics) in 1958, Gattel worked as executive vice president Irwin Donenfeld's assistant from 1958 to 1968, rising to production coordinator in 1968. While at DC, Gattel began an archive of all the company's publications, a resource which proved invaluable in later years.

Gattel retired as DC's production coordinator in 1973, and was given a Special Award by the Academy of Comic Book Arts in "for bringing her special warmth to our history."
