= Don Sherwood (cartoonist) =

American cartoonist

- Born: September 30, 1930 New York state, U.S.
- Died: March 6, 2010 (aged 79) Huntersville, North Carolina
- Area: Cartoonist
- Notable works: Dan Flagg

Don Sherwood (September 12, 1930 – March 6, 2010) was an American cartoonist and illustrator who created Dan Flagg, the first nationally syndicated comic strip to feature a U.S. Marine.

== Biography ==
=== Early life and career ===
Don Sherwood, a native of rural New York, turned a childhood love of drawing into a six-decade career as a cartoonist and illustrator. Born on September 12, 1930, Sherwood was enthralled by radio and movie entertainment, and the adventures of heroes such as The Lone Ranger and Hopalong Cassidy fueled his artistic imagination. As a teenager, Sherwood sent samples of his art to Chester Gould, the creator of Dick Tracy. Gould was impressed and wrote back, telling Sherwood that he had talent and encouraging him to move to Gould's city of Chicago to study the craft. Sherwood took the advice, leaving high school and enrolling at the Chicago Academy of Fine Arts. While in Chicago, Sherwood visited Gould regularly to observe his cartooning habits and worked as a copy boy at the Chicago Daily News.

Also at that time, Sherwood enlisted in the U.S. Marine Corps Reserves. He was called into active duty and fought with the First Marine Division in the Korean War, spending 18 months in combat operations in the Korean mountainside. The experience had a transformative effect on Sherwood, who developed a deep respect and appreciation for the Corps and its values. Upon returning to the United States, Sherwood moved to New York and resumed his young cartooning career by working as a bylined staff artist for the New York Mirror, as an illustrator on the comic strips Cotton Woods (General Features) and Will Chance (Columbia Features), and then as an assistant for George Wunder on the adventure strip Terry and the Pirates.

=== Dan Flagg ===
In 1963, at the age of 32, Sherwood launched Dan Flagg. The strip, featuring a Marine hero appeared in 400 newspapers and in most major metropolitan markets, including the New York Daily News, the Los Angeles Times, the Chicago Tribune and the Washington Post. It was originally syndicated with the McNaught Syndicate, later moving to Bell-McClure.

The creation of Dan Flagg launched Sherwood forward in his profession. He was invited to lunch with President Lyndon B. Johnson at the White House, joining four other famed military cartoonists (Milton Caniff, Mort Walker, Bill Mauldin and Wunder). He was a presenter at the 1964 World's Fair in New York, and "Dan Flagg Day" ceremonies were held in New York City and Philadelphia. Sherwood researched his strip exhaustively, visiting Marine installations, talking to recruits and generals, and studying the Corps and the subjects of planned storylines. As a result, Sherwood was commended for the authenticity of his artwork (after one strip contained a drawing of the U.S. Embassy in New Delhi, India, Sherwood received a letter from the architect of the building, Edward Durell Stone, praising its accuracy) and for the timeliness of his storylines (after one adventure involving Cuban relations, a group seeking to oust Fidel Castro wrote to Sherwood to ask for Dan Flagg's cooperation). Sherwood consistently appeared on behalf of the Marine Corps, with whom he shared a mutual respect; the Marine Corps Commandant, David Shoup, met with Sherwood and called him "a master of his art." Among his commendations, Sherwood received a plaque from the U.S. Marine Corps Combat Correspondents Association and a citation from the National Press Club.

By 1965 Sherwood had completely withdrawn from working on Dan Flagg, instead farming the work out to a series of ghostwriters and artists, among them Archie Goodwin and Al Williamson. As Dan Flagg continued to establish its place in newspapers in the mid-1960s, Sherwood was approached by Universal Studios about having the Marine hero appear on television. Sherwood had modeled Dan Flagg after his movie hero, Robert Taylor, and Taylor agreed to star as Dan Flagg in the proposed television series. Taylor visited Sherwood at his home in Oneonta, New York, appearing at the city's "Dan Flagg Day" ceremony. However, with war escalating in Vietnam, public sentiment for military-themed entertainment was turning. A Dan Flagg television deal was not finalized, and by mid-1967 the Dan Flagg strip had been discontinued.

=== Later career ===
During the 1970s, Sherwood worked in a variety of media. He handled character design for Hanna-Barbera Productions, created storyboards for Columbia Pictures, and wrote and illustrated comic books including The Partridge Family and The Phantom for Charlton Comics. Sherwood also drew upon his fondness for the popular culture of his youth in creating the syndicated nostalgia feature Return with Us To ..., which appeared in more than 350 newspapers. Additionally, he collaborated with writer Louis Lomax on the proposed feature Deadline and with Carlton E. Morse on an adaptation of his old-time radio program, I Love a Mystery, which ultimately was published as a graphic novel.

Beginning in 1981, Sherwood illustrated the comic-strip feature Sergeant Preston of the Yukon for Lone Ranger Television. He again spent months of research in developing the strip, visiting the Royal Canadian Mounted Police and the Alaska State Troopers. Following the run of the Mountie-hero feature, the latest in his line of adventure strips, Sherwood wrote and illustrated the comic-strip version of The Flintstones for several years. He continued to showcase his distinct illustrative style and sharp, clear lines in producing work for Archie Comics, the Roy Rogers Museum, The National Broadcasters Hall of Fame, and other outlets. After leaving the Flintstones assignment, Sherwood approached Dick Clark about adapting his syndicated radio program Dick Clark's Rock, Roll & Remember for the Sunday comics page. Clark agreed and, together with Clark and writer Fred Bronson, Sherwood produced the Sunday feature, which appeared in top newspapers including the New York Daily News and the Chicago Sun-Times. Clark later would option Dan Flagg for a television project.

Sherwood died on March 6, 2010, still pursuing his childhood love of drawing at the age of 79. He was buried with full military honors at Quantico National Cemetery.
