= The Adventures of Alan Ladd =

Comic book

- Cover to Adventures of Alan Ladd #1 (Oct-Nov 1949).

Publication information
- Publisher: DC Comics
- Schedule: Bimonthly
- Format: Ongoing series
- Publication date: October/November 1949 - February/March 1951
- No. of issues: 9

Creative team
- Artist(s): Sy Barry; Nick Cardy; Joe Certa; Carmine Infantino; Ruben Moreira; Curt Swan

Adventures of Alan Ladd is a nine-issue series of comic books published by DC Comics from 1949 to 1951. The stories featured the film actor Alan Ladd in a variety of adventurous situations. The first six issues feature photos of the actor on the covers.

== See also ==
- The Adventures of Bob Hope
- The Adventures of Dean Martin and Jerry Lewis
