= Jack Adler =

American comics artist

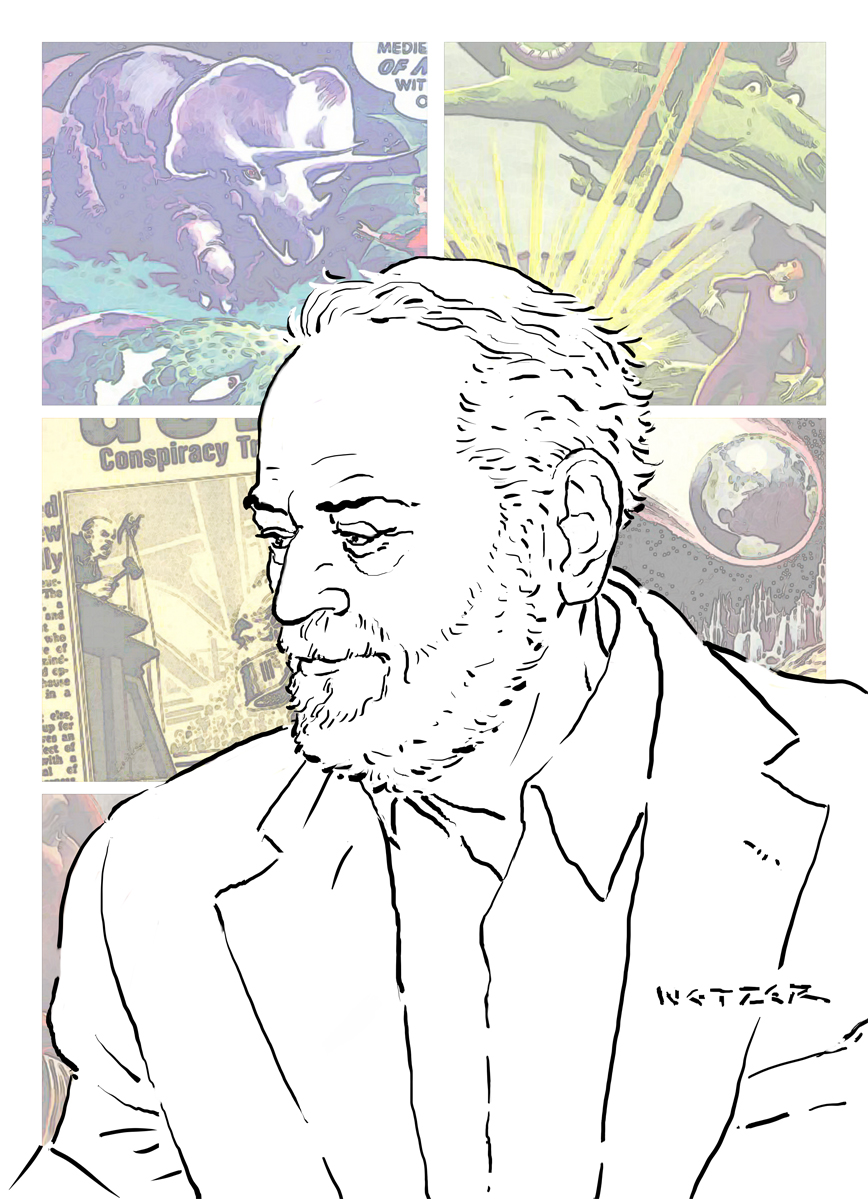
- Jack Adler by Michael Netzer
- Born: July 1, 1917 Manhattan, New York, U.S.
- Died: September 18, 2011 (aged 94) New York City, New York, U.S.
- Areas: Penciller, Colourist
- Notable works: Sea Devils
- Awards: Shazam Award, 1971; Inkpot Award, 2004

Jack Adler (July 1, 1917 – September 18, 2011) was an artist who worked as a cover artist and colorist for DC Comics. He was a staff member of DC's production department from 1946 to 1981, rising steadily up the ranks to production manager and vice president of production.

== Early life ==
Adler attended the High School of Art and Design, and graduated from Brooklyn College.

== Career ==
Adler's first comics job was for Funny Folks #2 (DC Comics, Jun./July 1946). He received the industry's Shazam Award for Best Colorist in 1971. Adler's cover art was often featured on Silver Age issues of Sea Devils, G.I. Combat, and Green Lantern.

After going to work for DC Comics in 1946, he took on a staff position doing production and coloring for the entire DC line in 1947. He held this position until 1960, when he became DC's assistant production manager for the next fifteen years. In 1972 Adler was the visual inspiration for the Swamp Thing villain Ferrett, drawn by Bernie Wrightson in the first issue of the hit series. From 1975 until his retirement in 1981, Adler was DC's production manager and vice president of production.

== Family ==
Adler was the cousin of radio host Howard Stern.
