= Samm Schwartz =

- Born: Samuel Schwartz; October 15, 1920 Brooklyn, New York
- Died: November 13, 1997 (aged 77) Miami, Florida
- Areas: Cartoonist, Penciller, Inker, Editor, Letterer
- Notable works: Jughead; Tippy Teen

Samm Schwartz (October 15, 1920 – November 13, 1997) was an American comic artist best known for his work in MLJ and Archie Comics, specifically on the character Jughead Jones.

== Biography ==
Schwartz was born in Brooklyn, where he took art instruction at the Pratt Institute. After working as an apprentice at a New York fashion studio and a part-time male model, he joined MLJ in 1942, shortly after the creation of Archie.

Schwartz, who pencilled, inked, and lettered much of his own work, specialized in stories featuring Jughead, and was the lead artist on the Jughead solo title through much of the 1950s and early 1960s. His colleague and friend, Joe Edwards, recalled that it was Schwartz' work that turned the character from a second banana to a star: "He made Jughead! . . . He put in personality and that's what makes the [characters] live." One of the most popular Jughead supporting characters, Big Ethel, was designed by Schwartz.

In 1965, Schwartz left Archie Comics to become an artist and editor at Tower Comics, founded by former Archie editor Harry Shorten. Schwartz helped edit T.H.U.N.D.E.R. Agents, but his main project was Tippy Teen, an Archie-style comic about the adventures of a spunky teenaged girl. The comic and its spinoff, Tippy's Friends Go-Go and Animal, featured many stories drawn by Schwartz, as well as contributions from moonlighting Archie artists like Harry Lucey and Dan DeCarlo. When Tower Comics folded, Schwartz spent a year at DC Comics, drawing stories and covers for their teen humor titles, Date with Debbi and Debbi's Dates.

In 1969, Schwartz returned to Archie Comics and once again became the main artist on Jughead. He drew most issues of that title from 1970 to 1987, still doing his own inking and lettering, as well as contributing stories to other titles like Reggie and Me and That Wilkin Boy. In 1987, Jughead was re-launched with new artists, but Schwartz continued to draw Jughead stories for the company, many of which appeared in Jughead digests.

Schwartz' style is distinguished by his loose, rubbery character poses and skinny, simplified designs. One of his favorite techniques was presenting characters in silhouette: "Whenever in doubt, silhouette," he told editor Victor Gorelick. He also frequently drew without regard for the boundaries of the panels; his characters would stand on the dialogue balloon in the panel below, or their outstretched arms would protrude into the panel beside them. At other times, he would eliminate panel lines altogether and draw the characters in an open white space.

Particularly after his return to Archie, he also liked to draw in his own gags or even silent mini-stories in the background. His scenes in the hall of Riverdale High School often feature explosions, pratfalls and other mishaps by characters who aren't directly involved in the story, and Edwards was particularly fond of a gag where Schwartz made it look like Mr. Weatherbee was making a rude gesture at a portrait on his office wall. Schwartz sometimes drew himself into his comics as a background character, particularly on posters asking Riverdale residents to "vote for Samm."

Though Schwartz did not usually write his own stories, claiming that "it's much easier for me to draw a person doing something than describe it," he often rewrote the stories he was given, sometimes even including an "additional dialogue" credit for himself. When Schwartz did not like a script, Gorelick would tell him "if you don't like it, see what you want to do with it. If you can make it funny, good."

Schwartz' first name was originally "Sam." He added the extra "m" to his signature to make his name seem more unusual.

Schwartz died on November 13, 1997, aged 77.
