= Constance Bannister =

American photographer (1913–2005)

- Bannister in self-portrait, circa 1942, with a Graflex camera.
- Born: February 11, 1913; Ashland City, Tennessee, U.S.
- Died: August 17, 2005 (aged 92); Laurel Hollow, New York City
- Known for: photography

Constance Bannister (February 11, 1913 – August 17, 2005) was an American photographer. She was an avid baby photographer and is reported to have taken more than 100,000 shots of babies.

Born Constance Lorraine Gibbs, on February 11, 1913, in Ashland City, Tennessee, to Arthur Thomas Gibbs and Bessie Serena Jackson, Bannister moved to New York to study photography, studying first at the New York School of Applied Design and the School of Modern Photography then enrolling at the New York Institute for Photography. Her first assignment, in 1937, was shooting Palm Beach society photographs for the Associated Press. She opened a studio in New York and worked for the Chicago Tribune, shooting Broadway plays headed to Chicago. She also photographed the New York City Ballet and the Ice Capades. Her work was featured in many popular magazines in the 1940s and 1950s.

Her baby pictures were published in books, calendars, and advertisements during the 1940s and 1950s. A line of "Bannister Baby" dolls were produced in the 1950s. Beginning in 1946, she wrote a comic strip, "Baby Banters," syndicated twice weekly to approximately 50 newspapers.

Bannister was married three times, first in 1936 to Stephen A. Bannister (div. 1938); later to Air Force Captain Charles G. Fredericks and lastly to Joseph Hatcher (m. 1956). Bannister died on August 17, 2005, in Laurel Hollow in Nassau County, New York, where she lived.

== Selected publications ==
- Bannister Babies: "We Were Spies Behind the Iron Curtain." New York: American Binder Co., 1953.
- A Child's Grace. Text by Ernest Edward Claxton, photographs by Constance Bannister. New York: E.P. Dutton, 1948.
- Constance Bannister's Astrotots. New York: Essandess Special Editions, c1969. ISBN 067110359X (pbk.)
- Constance Bannister's Baby Photo Calendar and Week By Week Engagement Book. New York: A.S. Barnes, c1953.
- Funny Comments About Cooking By the Bits Babies: 21 Delightfully Amusing Pictures. Brooklyn, NY: Rockland & Co., 1951.
- Gerald Gardner's From the Back of the Incubator. Photographs by Constance Bannister. New York: Pocket Books, 1966.
- How I Photograph Babies and Pets. [Cleveland, Ohio]: [General Electric Company Lamp Department], 1958.
- Infernal Revenue. New York: Essandess Special Editions, 1968.
- It's a Riot to Diet. New York: Pocket Books, 1965.
- Let's Face It. St. Paul, Minn.: Brown & Bigelow, 1954.
- Librari-anna: The Professional Librarian. Captions by Jeanne and Bob Holmes; photographs by Constance Bannister. New York: Columbia University Press, 1952.
- Members of the P.T.A. New York: Essandess Special Edition, 1970. ISBN 978-0-671-10524-2
- The Organization Baby. New York: Essandess Special Edition, 1967.
- The Patient. Photographs by H. Armstrong Roberts and Constance Bannister. Rochester, N.Y.: Bausch & Lomb, 1950.
- Puppy and Me. Text by Ann Ratzesberger; photographs by Constance Bannister. Chicago: Rand McNally, 1955.
- Safety Pinups. [New York]: Mercer, Howard Co., 1952.
- "Senator, I'm Glad You Asked Me That!" New York: American Binder Co., 1952.
- Visiting Hours Are Over. New York: [Essandess Special Editions], 1968.
- What to Expect When You're Expecting. New York: [Essandess Special Editions], 1969.
