= Date with Debbi =

- Date with Debbi #1 (1969), artist: Samm Schwartz.

Publication information
- Publisher: DC Comics
- Format: Ongoing series
- Publication date: Jan./Feb. 1969 - Oct./Nov. 1972
- No. of issues: 18

Creative team
- Written by: John Albano, Henry Boltinoff, Barbara Friedlander, Phil Mendez
- Penciller(s): Henry Boltinoff, Doug Crane, Owen Fitzgerald, Stan Goldberg, Phil Mendez, Bob Oksner, John Rosenberger, Samm Schwartz, Henry Scarpelli, Jack Sparling
- Inker(s): Henry Boltinoff, Owen Fitzgerald, Phil Mendez, Henry Scarpelli, Samm Schwartz
- Letterer(s): Henry Boltinoff, Samm Schwartz
- Editor(s): Dick Giordiano

Date with Debbi is a DC Comics comic book series, which ran for 18 issues between 1969 and 1972. About Debbi's attempts to find happiness, often through dating, the series combined humor and romance elements. Similar in appearance and tone to Archie Comics titles of the same era, Date with Debbi's title paid homage to the long-running DC comic A Date with Judy (1947–1960). It also recycled some covers and plots from the earlier series.

The series won recognition in the industry, including the 1970 Shazam Award for Best Inker (Humor Division) for Henry Scarpelli for his work on it, Leave It to Binky, and other DC comics.

A spin-off title, Debbi's Dates, ran for 11 issues from 1969 to 1971. DC's entire humor line was cancelled in 1971–1972.
