= Don Orehek =

American freelance cartoonist (1928–2022)

Don Orehek self-portrait

Don Orehek (August 9, 1928 – December 6, 2022) was an American freelance cartoonist who contributed gag cartoons to a wide variety of newspapers, magazines and books. On more obscure publications, he used several pseudonyms, including Sam de Sade, Di Benvenuto and Kobasa.

Born in Brooklyn, New York, Orehek attended the School of Industrial Art, spent four years in the Navy and then studied cartooning and illustration at the School of Visual Arts.

The Oreheks lived in Port Washington, New York on Long Island. They also lived in Renton, Washington.

His work appeared in Adam, Army Laughs, The Christian Science Monitor, Cosmopolitan, Cracked, Good Housekeeping, Ladies' Home Journal, Look, Modern Maturity, Playboy, The Saturday Evening Post and other publications, including one-shot magazines and specialized cartoon magazines, such as Prize Cartoons.

Orehek died on December 6, 2022.

== Syndication ==
Orehek was a major contributor to the McNaught Syndicate's This Funny World single-panel series, and he also drew many cartoons for King Features' Laff-A-Day.

== Books ==
He has illustrated more than 30 paperback humor and joke books, beginning with Bob Vlasic's 101 Pickle Jokes in 1974. This was followed by The Official Name Callers' Book, The Laugh-a-Minute Joke Book (1989) and many more. His work has been reprinted in numerous cartoon collections, such as Sam Gross' Movies Movies Movies (Harper & Row. 1989).

Based on 28 years of recorded sales, Orehek and his wife Suzanne calculated that he had sold over 12,000 cartoons during his lengthy career:

Our estimate is 12,000 +. Hard to believe, isn't it? Our basis for this number is a written record of sales from August 1966 (when wife Suzy started working for Don) through December 1994. This record is a simple list of sales on three-hole notebook paper. It is 253 pages with 25 lines per page. That's 6,325 sales. Add to that multiple-drawings in sales to magazines like Cracked, about 30 drawings for each of 32 joke books, and the other 32 years before and after the list, and--well--we stopped counting at 12,000.

== Awards ==
He is a four-time winner of the National Cartoonists Society's Gag Cartoon Award (1972, 1982, 1984, 1985), and he received awards twice at Montreal's Man and His World exhibition.

His interest in caricatures was solidified in 1966 with a trip to Vietnam under the auspices of the National Cartoonists Society and the U.S. Department of Defense. Shortly after returning, Orehek and his fellow cartoonists were invited to the White House where they were personally thanked by President Lyndon Johnson for entertaining American and Vietnamese troops.
