= Akwas =

- Author(s): Mike Roy
- Current status/schedule: Concluded Sunday strip
- Launch date: June 14, 1964
- End date: March 28, 1965 (remained in syndication until 1972)
- Syndicate(s): Columbia Features
- Genre(s): Adventure, Native Americans

Akwas by Mike Roy is a Sunday only adventure comic strip which ran from June 14, 1964, to March 28, 1965, and was syndicated through 1972. It featured the Native American character Akwas in realistic historical adventures set before Christopher Columbus' voyage to the Americas.

The best format is the half page; the strip is also found in a third of a page and tabloid formats, which drop one or more panels. The strip had a topper called Indian Lore and Crafts.

There were four stories: Cricket Kidnapped, The Dream Fast, Mission to the Huron, and Jessakid. Toward the end of the strip, as it appeared in fewer and fewer newspapers, Mike Roy attempted to revive interest by giving Akwas superpowers. The strip ended shortly after this.

None of the stories have been reprinted, but one Akwas strip can be seen on the cover of Comics Revue #266.

== Bibliography ==
- Green, Paul. Encyclopedia of Weird Westerns, p. 181, "Roy was well known for his work on the Native American Sunday strip Akwas in the 1960s.", McFarland, 2009, ISBN 978-0-7864-4390-1.
- Roy, Mike. The Best of Mike Roy, Ward Ritchie Press, 1978, ASIN: B000NYCCAY
- Strickler, Dave. Syndicated Comic Strips and Artists, 1924-1995: The Complete Index. Cambria, CA: Comics Access, 1995. ISBN 0-9700077-0-1.
- Norwood, Rick. "An Episode Guide to Akwas by Mike Roy," Comics Revue #266.
