= Leo Garel =

American artist

Leo Garel (1917 – July 4, 1999) was an American artist. He illustrated cartoons for such notable magazines as The New Yorker, The Saturday Evening Post and Playboy.

== Early life ==
Garel was born in Brooklyn, New York, to Max and Sarah Garil (née Kramer); his surname was changed from 'Garil' to 'Garel' to sound more American. Both of Garel's parents were Ashkenazi Jewish immigrants from an area of the Russian Empire near Kiev.

== Career ==
Garel was prolific painter and cartoonist, and later worked with Erik H. Erikson developing the field of art therapy.

== Later years ==
He lived the later part of his life in Stockbridge, Massachusetts until his death from cancer. He was survived by a brother, two children and two grandchildren.
