= Robert M. Oksner =

American advertising professional (1926-2017)

Robert M. Oksner (January 6, 1926 – January 2, 2017) was an advertising professional. He worked for some of New York's top advertising agencies for three decades. He wrote such ads as "He's well on his way to being a brilliant surgeon. Now's your chance to stop him. Just turn this page" for the United Negro College Fund and "Full Color Sound" for Sony Tape, with art by Milton Glaser.

Oksner left advertising to be an early scriptwriter for the children's educational television show Sesame Street, where he created the character Simon Soundman (performed by Jerry Nelson) who spoke mainly in sound effects. He was later a creative consultant for nonprofit, educational and public interest agencies.

== Biography ==
Oksner was born January 6, 1926, in Buffalo, New York, and grew up in St. Louis, Missouri. His father, Simon, was a haberdasher and his mother, Blanche, worked in a defense plant in St. Louis and later as a court stenographer. Upon graduating high school in 1943, Oksner joined the Coast Guard where he took weather observations in the North Atlantic as chief aerographer's mate during World War II. After the war, he studied English and Psychology at Washington University, earning his BA in 1949.

He worked in a small ad agency in St. Louis before moving on to the large St. Louis department store, Stix, Baer & Fuller, where he worked as a copywriter. His work included a pun-filled weekly column carried in St. Louis media, including the St. Louis Post-Dispatch, featuring headlines such as "New Donut Maker Comes Through with Flying Crullers" and a description of a shorts/skirt/shirt ensemble for ladies titled "Ready for Play at the Drop of a Skirt."

== Madison Avenue ==
Oksner left St. Louis for New York to write copy for Stern's Department Store and soon moved on to some of New York's most famous advertising agencies to create some of the iconic ads of the 50s, 60s and 70s. At BBDO he created a Schaefer Beer newspaper ad featuring a bottle with at the bottom of the page and a glass on the side. The copy: "For real enjoyment, turn this page slowly to the right." Working at Doherty, Clifford, Steers & Shenfield on a campaign for Burberry raincoats, he created a suave male character who told of his adventures while wearing the raincoat. The humorist S.J. Perelman further embellished the character's adventures in a story in The New Yorker.

At the Marshalk agency, Oksner won a Gold Pencil Campaign award from One Show, an international advertising award show, for his Chun King print ad featuring an elderly Chinese lady standing before an array of appealing Chinese dishes with the caption, "Just like Grandma Used to Make." At Waring & LaRosa he was honored with another Gold Pencil Campaign award for his Sony "Full-Color Sound" ads featuring a music staff bursting with pictures of colorful sunsets and landscapes. At Waring & LaRosa his campaign for Smith Corona, "Smith Corona Makes Your Words Sing" won a Big Apple award from New York Market Radio. And he also wrote radio scripts for Random House books featuring celebrities like Alfred Hitchcock hailing a book by Abba Eban and Jules Feiffer reading words about war from the Random House Dictionary.

At McCaffery & McCall, working on the Canadian Club account won him and his wife, teacher Judith (Dubin) Oksner, a trip around the world, researching and creating full-page "Canadian Club Guides" to the cities of Tokyo, Bangkok and Singapore, which ran in magazines like The New Yorker.

== Sesame Street ==
In the early 1970s, Sesame Street producers lured Oksner from McCaffery & McCall to join a select handful of leading admen and educators who were tapped to develop the revolutionary children's educational show. Oksner wrote scripts for both Muppets and humans. He worked there for eight years.

After leaving Sesame Street, Oksner returned to advertising, creating unusual PSAs for nonprofits such as The American Lung Association using celebrities like Sid Caesar, the Smothers Brothers, Pearl Bailey and Cybill Shepherd. They delivered messages such as "Take Care of Your Lungs—They're Only Human."

== Late projects ==
Oksner retired from Grey Advertising in 1990, where he was Vice President and Creative Supervisor. But in retirement he continued to work as a creative consultant, with a special interest in nonprofits. His clients included The Robert Wood Johnson Foundation, where he wrote a report on possible effects of liquor advertising on television. He also wrote a comic book for hemophiliac children, and did work for Lincoln Center's Department of Programs and Services for People with Disabilities.

Oksner was interviewed about his career in advertising to inform developers of the dramatic American television series Mad Men. He lived in New York City and Hancock, N.H. with his wife, Judith, a painter and musician.

He died on January 2, 2017, a few days short of his 91st birthday.
