= Henry Scarpelli =

American comic book artist (1930–2010)

- Scarpelli as shown in a 1971 DC house ad
- Born: July 30, 1930 Concord, Staten Island, New York
- Died: April 4, 2010 (aged 79) Grasmere, Staten Island, New York
- Areas: Penciller, Inker
- Collaborators: Stan Goldberg
- Children: Glenn Scarpelli

Henry Scarpelli (July 30, 1930 – April 4, 2010) was an Italian-American comic book artist. His work won him recognition from the industry, including the Shazam Award for Best Inker (Humor Division) in 1970, for his work on Date with Debbi, Leave It to Binky, and other DC comics, including the series based on the Margie television sit-com. He is also noted for his work for Archie Comics, including drawing the daily Archie comic strip for most of the 1990s and 2000s.

His son is actor Glenn Scarpelli, who has appeared in several one-off features in the Archie books under the umbrella title "Glenn Scarpelli in Hollywood".

== Early Life ==
First born son Enrico L "Henry" Scarpelli on July 30, 1930 in Richmond, New York City, New York (Birth Certificate # 001662) to Louis J. and Rose (Sansone) Scarpelli, who had previously married on December 6, 1927 in Staten Island, New York (Marriage License # 001055). His siblings include at least: Rose (Scarpelli) Connelly, Louise Scarpelli, Louis J. Scarpelli, Jr., Ralph Scarpelli, and Mary Ann (Scarpelli) Harrell. He was married to, at least, Claire Lagana in 1961 in Staten Island, New York (Marriage License # 000247), with whom he had a son, Glenn Scarpelli (actor).

== Death ==
Scarpelli died at the age of 79 on April 4, 2010, after a long illness.
