= Mike Roy =

Canadian comic artist (1921–1996)

- Born: Joseph Michel Roy; 1921 Quebec, Canada
- Died: 1996 (aged 74–75)
- Areas: Cartoonist, Artist
- Pseudonym: Michael Robard
- Notable works: Akwas

Joseph Michel Roy (1921–1996) was a Canadian comic book and comic strip artist, working during the Golden Age of Comic Books and the Silver Age of Comic Books. He is best known for his stories about Native Americans.

== Biography ==
Born in Quebec, Roy he emigrated to the United States where he studied at the School of Industrial Art and Pratt Institute. He was a co-founder of a museum of Native American and Eskimo art.

=== Early work ===
Roy got his first job in comics in 1940, as an assistant to Sub-Mariner artist Bill Everett. At Timely Comics, the 1940s forerunner of Marvel Comics, he drew the only appearance of the superhero the Young Avenger, in U.S.A. Comics #1 (Aug. 1941), under the pseudonym Michael Robard. This story was previously incorrectly ascribed to Howard Purcell.

He went on to work on many Golden Age comic books such as Captain America Comics and Crime Does Not Pay. Roy also did work for a number of publishers, including Atlas Comics, Holyoke Publications, and Archie Comics.

=== Comic strips ===
Roy is best known for his work on comic strips. His first strip, for the New York Herald Tribune Syndicate, was an adaptation of the Leslie Charteris character The Saint, which he drew from 1948 to 1951. He also illustrated the comic strip Nero Wolfe for Columbia Features in the 1950s, and worked as a ghost artist for Flash Gordon.

In 1964, he created his Native American character Akwas in a Sunday strip by the same name (also for Columbia Features).

=== Screaming Eagle ===
Roy's final work was a hardcover graphic novel, Screaming Eagle, published posthumously in 1999 by Discovery Comics.
