= The Adventures of Bob Hope =

Comic book series

- Cover to issue #1 (February–March 1950).

Publication information
- Publisher: National Periodical Publications
- Schedule: Bi-monthly
- Format: Ongoing series
- Publication date: 1950-1968
- No. of issues: 109

Creative team
- Written by: Arnold Drake
- Artist(s): Neal Adams; Owen Fitzgerald; Bob Oksner

The Adventures of Bob Hope is an American celebrity comics comic book series that was published by National Periodical Publications (an imprint of DC Comics). The series featured stories based on comedian Bob Hope, as well as assorted humorous stories. The series ran for 109 issues from 1950 through 1968.

== Publication history ==
As 1950 neared, sales for superhero comics were declining. National Periodical Publications wanted to diversify its titles and so began licensing the right to use celebrity images, including Jerry Lewis, Dean Martin, Alan Ladd, and Bob Hope. Issue #1 (cover dated February–March 1950) set the tone for most of the 1950s. The lead story would feature Hope in a misadventure similar to his film roles; the back up stories tended to revolve around movie-related themes or characters. For example, issue #1 had a story on Rhonda Fleming, Hope's co-star in the 1949 film The Great Lover.

By the time Arnold Drake became the main writer for the series in the 1960s, sales for the Hope series were flagging. According to Drake, "I knew that the reason for this was that the kids couldn't relate to these characters. [Bob Hope was] not of their time. What the kids were relating to then was science fiction and horror. So I determined to inject science fiction and horror into Hope and Lewis. And it worked." The characters Drake introduced to make the series more palatable to young readers included Hope's nerdy ward Tadwallader Jutefruce, Tadwallader's alter-ego Super-Hip, a talking dog named Harvard, and the Benedict Arnold High faculty members, all of whom were based on Universal Monsters characters: Dr. Van Pyre, Frank N. Stein, Heinrich Von Wolfmann, and Miss Ghastly. Bob Oksner had already become the series artist with issue #61, and he and Drake became the creative team most associated with the series.

Drake provided storyboards for each tale to explain the visuals for the artist. He said of working on The Adventures of Bob Hope, "I loved being able to make comedy an adventure. I put a lot of comedy into my adventure stories, and when I got to Bob Hope and Jerry Lewis, I put a lot of adventure into my comedy stories. So we had Bob involved with spies and that kind of thing. So I always really enjoyed that form. I liked it in the movies. I liked the Bob Hope movies in which he was involved in an adventure of one sort or another."

The editorial staff wanted to take the terminally uncool Bob Hope out of the picture, both retitling the series The Adventures of Super-Hip and removing Bob as a character, so later issues nudged the series in that direction by having Bob appear less and placing greater emphasis on the new characters like Super-Hip. However, the series was canceled with issue #109 (March 1968), before those plans could be fulfilled.

== Artists and writers ==
The first four issues featured photographs of Hope on the cover; subsequent covers were illustrated. Owen Fitzgerald was the original artist for the series. He was replaced by Bob Oksner, and Oksner was replaced by Neal Adams for the final four issues.

There were no story credits, though some sources credit Cal Howard with writing some early scripts. Beginning with issue #88 (Sept. 1964), Arnold Drake received a byline, and would go on to write most of the scripts for rest of the series run.

== See also ==
- The Adventures of Alan Ladd
- The Adventures of Dean Martin and Jerry Lewis
