= Jack Markow =

American cartoonist

Jack Markow (1905–1983) was an American cartoonist who also wrote instructional books about cartooning, comic strips and comic art. For three years, he was the cartoon editor of Argosy.

Born in London, Markow was a New Yorker from the age of two. He took art courses at the High School of Commerce (later Louis D. Brandeis High School), where he drew for the school magazine. His high school drawings landed him a job doing layouts and paste-ups in the sales promotion department of the Fleishmann Yeast Company, where he also illustrated for the company's house organ. He later studied drawing and painting at the Art Students League.

His cartoons were published in books, greeting cards, calendars, advertising campaigns and major magazines, including The Saturday Evening Post and The New Yorker. He was a long-time columnist for Writer's Digest and Cartoonist Profiles.

== School of Visual Arts ==
Markow was one of the first faculty members at New York's School of Visual Arts, where he originated the magazine cartooning course and taught for eight years.

== Books ==
In addition to his Cartoon Consultants Calendar (Cartoon Consultants, 1952), Markow wrote four how-to books: Cartoonists and Gag Writers Handbook, Drawing and Selling Cartoons (Pitman Publishing, 1956), Drawing Comic Strips and Drawing Funny Pictures.

== Exhibitions ==
As a painter and graphic artist, Markow had three one-man shows in New York and was exhibited in group shows of major museums. His lithographs are in the permanent collection of the Metropolitan Museum, the New Jersey State Museum, the Smithsonian, the Library of Congress, the New York Public Library, the Brooklyn Museum, the University of Georgia, the University of Oregon and City College. He was included in 50 Best American Prints, 1933-38.

Markow lived in Manasquan, New Jersey, where he died in 1983.

== Awards ==
He received the National Cartoonists Society's 1979 Gag Cartoon Award and a prize at Montreal's 1972 International Cartoon Show.
