= Bob Oksner =

American comics artist (1916–2007)

- Born: October 14, 1916 Paterson, New Jersey, U.S.
- Died: February 18, 2007 (aged 90)
- Areas: Writer, Penciller, Inker

Bob Oksner (October 14, 1916 – February 18, 2007) was an American comics artist known for both adventure comic strips and for superhero and humor comic books, primarily at DC Comics.

== Biography ==
Oksner obtained a Masters degree in education from Columbia University, and taught art and history in high schools before breaking into comics. His early work includes creating the second version of Marvel Boy in 1943 for Timely Comics, the predecessor of Marvel Comics. He later wrote with Jerry Albert and drew the syndicated newspaper comic strip Miss Cairo Jones (1945–1947), after which DC Comics editor Sheldon Mayer hired him as an artist on comics adapted from other media. Oksner drew a few Justice Society of America stories in All Star Comics during his early years at DC. He moved from adventure strips to teen-oriented strips such as Leave It to Binky which debuted in February 1948. Oksner described Leave It to Binky as "the one that I really feel got my feet on the ground at DC. I did that one from the very beginning until it ended [in 1958]." Oksner's work in this field included The Adventures of Dean Martin and Jerry Lewis and its successor, The Adventures of Jerry Lewis; The Adventures of Bob Hope; The Many Loves of Dobie Gillis; Sgt. Bilko; Pat Boone; and Welcome Back, Kotter; and, for the King Features syndicate, the newspaper comic-strip spin-off of the 1950s TV sitcom I Love Lucy. Other work includes drawing the original humor comics Angel and the Ape and Stanley and His Monster.

When the demand for humor comics fell off by the 1970s, Oksner began drawing DC superhero series such as Superman, Supergirl, Shazam!, Superman's Girl Friend, Lois Lane, and Ambush Bug.

Oksner's other work in comic strips included succeeding Gus Edson as writer of artist-creator Irwin Hasen's Dondi for a time beginning in 1965; and drawing and co-creating Soozi (1967), with Don Weldon. He retired from comics in 1986.

Oksner was Jewish. He was married to Patricia Kinzler. They had three daughters.

== Awards ==
Oksner won the National Cartoonists Society Division Award for Comic Books in 1960 and 1961, and in 1970 the Shazam Award for Best Pencil Artist (Humor Division) for his work on Adventure Comics and other DC titles.

Oksner was a recipient of the Inkpot Award in 2002.

== Bibliography ==
Interior pencil art (except where noted) includes:

=== DC Comics ===
- Action Comics (Superman) #429, 438–441, 446–449, 459 (inks over Curt Swan); #566 (inks over Howard Bender); #573 (inks over Kurt Schaffenberger); #577, 579 (inks over Keith Giffen); (Ambush Bug) #560, 563, 565 (inks over Giffen); #572 (inks over Bender) (1973–1986)
- Adventure Comics (Supergirl) #410–411, 414 (full art); #412–413 (inks over Art Saaf); #415 (inks over Win Mortimer); #417–418 (inks over José Delbo); #421–423 (inks over Mike Sekowsky); #419–420, 424 (inks over Tony DeZuniga) (1970–1972)
- The Adventures of Bob Hope #6–10, 13–17, 19–21, 23–24, 28, 67–77, 84, 86, 88, 90, 92–102, 105 (1950–1967)
- Adventures of Jerry Lewis #2, 4, 25, 36, 52, 73–74, 78, 83–98, 100, 105, 115, 120–122, 124 (1952–1971)
- All-American Comics #102 (1948)
- All-American Men of War #3 (1953)
- All Star Comics (Justice Society of America) #38 (full art); #43–47 (inks over Irwin Hasen) (1947–1949)
- Ambush Bug #1–4 (inks over Keith Giffen) (1985)
- Ambush Bug Stocking Stuffer #1 (inks over Keith Giffen) (1986)
- Angel and the Ape #1–7 (1968–1969)
- Binky #73, 75 (1970)
- Buzzy #23–26 (1949)
- Comic Cavalcade #29 (1948)
- Danger Trail #4–5 (1951)
- Daring New Adventures of Supergirl #1–13 (inks over Carmine Infantino) (1982–1983)
- Date With Debbi #13–14 (1971)
- DC Comics Presents #81 (inks over Keith Giffen) (1985)
- Detective Comics (Batgirl) #483–484; ("Tales of Gotham City") #492 (1979–1980)
- Elvira's House of Mystery #1 (inks over Ron Wagner); #2 (1986)
- Everything Happens to Harvey #1 (1953)
- Flash Comics (Ghost Patrol) #87–92, 95, 97–100 (inks over Carmine Infantino); (Atom) #93 (inks over Paul Reinman); #94 (full art) (1947–1948)
- The Fox and the Crow #96 (1966)
- Girls' Love Stories #21, 104, 108–110 (1953–1965)
- Girls' Romances #100, 108, 119 (1964–1966)
- Green Lantern #27 (inks over Howard Purcell) #34, 36, 38 (inks over Irwin Hasen) (1947–1949)
- House of Mystery #199 (1972)
- Leave It to Binky #1, 4, 7–9, 12–13, 15, 17–18, 20–21, 23–28, 32–35, 37, 39, 41, 43–45, 47, 50, 54 (1948–1956)
- Limited Collectors' Edition (Angel and the Ape) #C–34 (Note: Previously unpublished story originally intended for the characters' own series) (1975)
- The Many Loves of Dobie Gillis #2, 5–7, 9, 15–20, 25–26 (1960–1964)
- Miss Beverly Hills of Hollywood #2–4, 7 (1949–1950)
- Miss Melody Lane of Broadway #1–3 (1950)
- Mystery in Space #3, 5–6, 8, 10–12 (1951–1953)
- Our Army at War #2, 5 (1952)
- Pat Boone #3 (1960)
- Plop! #6 (inks over Mike Sekowsky) (1974)
- Romance Trail #1–2 (1949)
- Secret Hearts #8, 94 (1952–1964)
- Secret Origins vol. 2 (Challengers of the Unknown) #12 (inks over Chuck Patton) (1987)
- Sensation Comics #84–87, 106 (1948–1951)
- Sensation Mystery #113 (1953)
- Sergeant Bilko #5, 9, 11, 13 (1958–1959)
- Sgt. Bilko's Pvt. Doberman #6 (1959)
- Shazam! (Captain Marvel) #10–13, 15, 18; (Mary Marvel) #10, 13, 16, 19 (1974–1975)
- Showcase (Angel and the Ape) #77 (1968)
- Son of Ambush Bug #1–6 (inks over Keith Giffen) (1986)
- Stanley and His Monster #109–111 (1968)
- Strange Adventures #6–9, 13–14, 16, 18, 21–28 (1951–1953)
- Strange Sports Stories #1 (inks over Curt Swan) (1973)
- Suicide Squad Annual #1 (inks over Keith Giffen) (1988)
- Super Friends (The Seraph) #38, 41, 46 (1980–1981)
- Supergirl, vol. 2, #14–20, 22–23 (inks over Carmine Infantino) (1983–1984)
- Superman (The Private Life of Clark Kent) #267; (Superman) #268, 271, 276, 278, 280–281, 283–287, 289, 291–293, 295–300, 303–306, 399, 401–403 (inks over Curt Swan); #301–302 (inks over José Luis García-López); #404 (inks over Infantino); (Supergirl) #375 (inks over Carmine Infantino) (1973–1985)
- The Superman Family (Jimmy Olsen) #183 (inks over Kurt Schaffenberger); (Nightwing and Flamebird) #193 (inks over Ken Landgraf); (Lois Lane) #196–197, 202–222 (pencils) (1977–1982)
- Superman's Pal Jimmy Olsen #149–152 (inks over José Delbo) (1972)
- Swing with Scooter #12, 17, 31 (1968–1970)
- Welcome Back, Kotter #1 (inks over Jack Sparling); #3–5, 8–10 (inks over Ric Estrada) (1976–1978)
- Wonder Woman #205 (inks over Don Heck) (1973)
- Young Romance #173 (inks) (1971)

=== Marvel Comics ===
- All Winners Comics #9–11, 13 (1943–1944)
- Captain America Comics #65, 67 (1948)
- Kid Komics #1 (1943)
- Marvel Mystery Comics #10–46, 50–57, 72–75, 91 (1940–1949)
- Mystic Comics #2 (1944)
- U.S.A. Comics #7 (1943)

== Notes ==
Preceded by Murphy Anderson	Superman inker 1973–1976	Succeeded by Frank Springer
Preceded by Kurt Schaffenberger	Action Comics inker 1974–1976	Succeeded by Tex Blaisdell
