= Academy of Comic Book Arts =

Professional organization

- ACBA Sketchbook (1975). Cover art by Bernie Wrightson.
- Formation: 1970
- Defunct: 1977
- Type: Comics professionals organization
- Headquarters: Society of Illustrators
- Location: New York City
- Region served: United States of America
- Members: Comics professionals
- President: Stan Lee (1970); Dick Giordano (c. 1971); Neal Adams
- Affiliations: Shazam Award; ACBA Sketchbook

The Academy of Comic Book Arts (ACBA) was an American professional organization of the 1970s that was designed to be the comic book industry analog of such groups as the Academy of Motion Picture Arts and Sciences. Composed of comic-book professionals and initially formed as an honorary society focused on discussing the comic-book craft and hosting an annual awards banquet, the ACBA evolved into an advocacy organization focused on creators' rights.

The ACBA award, the Shazam Award, was a statuette in the shape of a lightning bolt. In addition to the creative awards, the ACBA also established the Academy of Comic Book Arts Hall of Fame award, inducting Superman creators Jerry Siegel and Joe Shuster as their initial honorees.

== History ==
Founded in 1970, the ACBA's first president was Stan Lee; its first vice-president was Dick Giordano (presidents initially served one-year terms). The ACBA met monthly at the Manhattan headquarters of the Society of Illustrators.

The ACBA Sketchbook (1973)

The Academy's Shazam Award was a successor to the 1960s Alley Award; the ACBA held its first annual awards banquet at the Statler Hilton Hotel's Terrace Ballroom on May 12, 1971.

Aside from its Shazam Awards, the ACBA also published an annual fundraiser sketchbook. Contributing to the 36-page ACBA Sketchbook 1973 were Neal Adams, Sergio Aragones, Frank Brunner, Howard Chaykin, Dave Cockrum, Reed Crandall, Frank Frazetta, Michael Kaluta, Gil Kane, Gray Morrow, John Romita Sr., Mike Royer, Syd Shores, Jim Starlin, Jim Steranko, Herb Trimpe, and Wally Wood. The 48-page ACBA Sketchbook 1975 included Adams, Aragones, Chaykin, Kaluta, Kane, Romita Sr., Steranko, Wood, and John Byrne, Russ Heath, Jeff Jones, Harvey Kurtzman, Walt Simonson, Michael Whelan, and Berni Wrightson. Wood also contributed to the 1976 and 1977 sketchbooks.

Under its later president, artist Neal Adams, the ACBA became an advocacy organization for creators' rights. The comic-book industry at that time typically did not return artists' physical artwork after shooting the requisite film for printing, and in some cases destroyed the artwork to prevent unauthorized reprints. The industry also did not then offer royalties or residuals, common in such creative fields as book publishing, film and television, and the recording industry.

Historian Jon B. Cooke writes:

While the ACBA was established [as] . . . a self-congratulatory organization focused on banquets and awards . . . it quickly served as a soapbox for the Angry Young Men in the industry, primarily Neal Adams, Archie Goodwin, and their ilk of educated, informed and gutsy artists and writers, self-confident and filled with a strong sense of self-worth, attitudes sadly absent from the field for decades. ... (Jeff Rovin recalled, 'I can't tell you how many times Martin [Goodman] would listen to some of the things Neal Adams was saying and mutter, "Who the hell does he think he is?"').

Adams wanted to focus on creator rights and pay rates, essentially making the ACBA a labor union. In a 1998 interview, Lee said, "ACBA became divided into two camps, it seemed. I wasn't interested in starting a union, so I walked away from it."

During 1970-1974, the ACBA Newsletter, varying in page count from 4-12 pages, was published by ACBA themselves on a roughly bi-monthly basis, subscriptions available to any interested party. The last known issue was #29, 1974.

Once the ACBA — riding a wave begun by the mid-'70s independent startup Atlas/Seaboard Comics, which instituted royalties and the return of artwork in order to attract creators — helped see those immediate goals achieved, it then gradually disbanded.

As writer Steven Grant notes, by 1977 the ACBA had "... disintegrated into what became Adams' "First Friday" professional get-togethers at his studio or apartment."

Irene Vartanoff was the final ACBA treasurer. In early 2005, approximately $3,000 in sketchbook sales plus general contributions to the ACBA and accumulated interest was donated from the ACBA's Bill Everett Fund — created in 1975 to help comics professionals in financial need — to The Hero Initiative (formerly known as A Commitment to Our Roots, or ACTOR), a federally chartered, not-for-profit corporation likewise dedicated.

== Legacy ==
The ACBA was the first in a string of largely unsuccessful comics-industry organizations that includes the Comic Book Creators Guild (1978–1979), the Comic Book Professionals Association (CBPA, 1992–1994), and Comic Artists, Retailers and Publishers (CARP, 1998). The long-running exception had been the publishers' group the Comics Magazine Association of America (CMAA), founded in 1954 and lasting through 2011, as a response to public pressure and a Senate subcommittee on juvenile delinquency, and which created the self-censorship board the Comics Code Authority.

Grant summed up the ABCA's legacy this way:

[The ACBA] had the support of what passed for comics fandom at the time. But that was also its weakness; its members drew their incomes from the same companies ACBA would have had to war on to be effective, and alternative markets were functionally non-existent. Fandom's "support" was also a double-edged sword, since many in fandom, as now, identified with the professionals' goals but wanted the rewards for themselves as the ones who created the comics, providing the companies with potential talent pools should existing professionals get too uppity. (Both Marvel and especially DC had already turned to foreign artists as a cost-cutting tool.) Significant changes for talent had to wait until new competition forced Marvel and DC to keep up, and Marvel didn't bother until DC, which had spent most of the '70s and early '80s in potentially fatal decline, and inspired by publicized early '80s creator-rights struggles by Jack Kirby and Steve Gerber, adopted many "independent publisher" notions about royalties, artist ownership of original artwork, etc. to woo talent away from Marvel.

== Shazam Awards ==
Shazam Awards
- Awarded for: Outstanding achievement in the comic book field
- Country: United States of America
- Presented by: Academy of Comic Book Arts
- First award: 1970
- Final award: 1975

The Shazam Awards were a series of awards given between 1970 and 1975 for outstanding achievement in the comic book field. Awards were given in the year following publication of the material (at a dinner ceremony modeled on the National Cartoonist Society's Reuben Award dinners). The Shazam Awards were based on nominations and were the first comics awards voted upon by industry professionals. The name of the award is that of the magic word used by the original Captain Marvel, a popular superhero of the 1940s and early 1950s.

Marvel's comic-book Secret Wars II #1 (1985) features a fictional scriptwriter, Stewart Cadwall (based on real-life writer Steve Gerber) who has a Shazam Award on his table. When Cadwall becomes a superhuman, his Shazam Award turns into a weapon. Cadwall and his Shazam Award re-appeared in Iron Man #197 (1985).

=== 1970 ===
Winners. Presented May 12, 1971.

- Best Letterer: Sam Rosen (Marvel Comics)
- Best Colorist: Jack Adler (DC Comics)
- Best Story: "No Evil Shall Escape My Sight" by Dennis O'Neil & Neal Adams, Green Lantern/Green Arrow #76 (DC Comics)
- Outstanding Achievement by an Individual: Jim Steranko (for book The Steranko History of Comics)
- Best Foreign Title: Legionarios del Espacio (writer-artist Esteban Maroto, Spain)
- Best New Talent: Barry Smith (Marvel Comics)
- Best Humor Inker: Henry Scarpelli (DC Comics)
- Best Humor Penciller: Bob Oksner (DC Comics)
- Best Humor Writer: Carl Barks, Junior Woodchucks (Gold Key Comics)
- Best Continuing Feature: Green Lantern/Green Arrow (DC Comics)
- Special Recognition outside the Field: Nostalgia Press (for comic strip reprints)
- Best Drama Inker: Dick Giordano
- Best Drama Penciller: Neal Adams
- Best Drama Writer: Dennis O'Neil
- Hall of Fame: Jerry Siegel & Joe Shuster
- Special Plaque: Stan Lee ("for forming ACBA")

=== 1971 ===
Winners. Presented 1972.

- Best Continuing Feature: Conan the Barbarian (Marvel)
- Best Individual Story: "Snowbirds Don't Fly" by Dennis O'Neil & Neal Adams, Green Lantern/Green Arrow #85 (DC)
- Best Writer (Dramatic Division): Roy Thomas
- Best Penciller (Dramatic Division): Neal Adams
- Best Inker (Dramatic Division): Dick Giordano
- Best Writer (Humor Division): John Albano
- Best Penciller (Humor Division): Dan DeCarlo
- Best Inker (Humor Division): Henry Scarpelli
- Best Letterer: Gaspar Saladino
- Best Colorist: Tatjana Wood
- Best Foreign Artist: Frank Bellamy
- Outstanding New Talent: (tie) Michael Kaluta, Richard Corben
- Special Recognition: Gil Kane, "for Blackmark, his paperback comics novel"
- Special Achievement by an Individual: Jack Kirby, "for his Fourth World series in Forever People, New Gods, Mister Miracle, Superman's Pal Jimmy Olsen"
- Hall of Fame: Will Eisner

=== 1972 ===
Winners. Presented 1973.

- Best Continuing Feature: n.a.
- Best Individual Story (Dramatic): "Dark Genesis" by Len Wein & Berni Wrightson, Swamp Thing #1 (DC).

Also nominated: "The Black Hound of Vengeance," by Roy Thomas & Barry Smith, Conan the Barbarian #20 (Marvel)

- Best Individual Short Story (Dramatic): "The Demon Within" by John Albano & Jim Aparo, House of Mystery #201 (DC)
- Best Writer (Dramatic Division): Len Wein, Swamp Thing
- Best Penciller (Dramatic Division): Berni Wrightson, Swamp Thing
- Best Inker (Dramatic Division): n.a.
- Best Humor Story: "The Poster Plague" by Steve Skeates & Sergio Aragones, House of Mystery #202 (DC)
- Best Writer (Humor Division): n.a.
- Best Penciller (Humor Division): n.a.
- Best Inker (Humor Division): Sergio Aragones, Mad
- Best Letterer: n.a.
- Best Colorist: n.a.
- Best Foreign Artist: n.a.
- Outstanding New Talent: n.a.
- Special Award: DC letterer/proofreader Gerda Gattel "for bringing her special warmth to our history"
- Superior Achievement by an Individual: Julius Schwartz "for bringing the Shazam Family back into print"
- Hall of Fame: n.a.

=== 1973 ===
Nominees where known, and winners. Presented 1974.

- Best Continuing Feature: Swamp Thing (DC)

Also nominated: Conan the Barbarian (Marvel), The Tomb of Dracula (Marvel)

- Best Individual Story (Dramatic): "Song of Red Sonja" by Roy Thomas & Barry Smith, Conan the Barbarian #24 (Marvel)

Also nominated: "A Clockwork Horror" by Len Wein & Berni Wrightson, Swamp Thing #6 (DC); "Finally, Shuma-Gorath" by Steve Englehart & Frank Brunner Marvel Premiere #10 (Marvel)

- Best Individual Short Story (Dramatic): "The Himalayan Incident" (Manhunter) by Archie Goodwin & Walt Simonson, Detective Comics #437 (DC)
- Best Writer (Dramatic Division): Archie Goodwin (Manhunter in Detective Comics #437-443)

Also nominated: Roy Thomas (Conan the Barbarian); Len Wein (Swamp Thing)

- Best Penciller (Dramatic Division): Berni Wrightson (Swamp Thing)

Also nominated: John Buscema (Conan the Barbarian, The Savage Sword of Conan); Mike Ploog (Marvel Spotlight, Frankenstein)

- Best Inker (Dramatic Division): Dick Giordano (Justice League of America)

Also nominated: Tom Palmer (The Tomb of Dracula); Berni Wrightson (Swamp Thing)

- Best Humor Story: "The Gourmet", Plop! #1 (DC)

Also nominated: "The Escape", Plop! #1; "F-f-frongs", Spoof #3 (Marvel); "Kung Fooey", Crazy #1 (Marvel)

- Best Writer (Humor Division): (tie) Stu Schwartzberg; Steve Skeates

Also nominated: Roy Thomas, Marv Wolfman

- Best Penciller (Humor Division): Marie Severin (Crazy)

Also nominated: Bob Foster (Crazy); Larry Hama (Crazy); Mike Ploog (Crazy)

- Best Inker (Humor Division): Ralph Reese

Also nominated: Russ Heath; John Severin; Herb Trimpe

- Best Letterer: Gaspar Saladino
- Best Colorist: Glynis Wein
- Best Foreign Comic Series: Lieutenant Blueberry
- Outstanding New Talent: (tie) Walt Simonson; Jim Starlin

Also nominated: Klaus Janson

- Superior Achievement by an Individual: Richard Corben
- Hall of Fame: Carl Barks

=== 1974 ===
Nominees and winners. Presented 1975.

- Best Continuing Feature: Conan the Barbarian (Marvel)

Also nominated: Man-Thing (Marvel), The Tomb of Dracula (Marvel)

- Best Individual Story (Dramatic): "Götterdämmerung" by Archie Goodwin & Walt Simonson, Detective Comics #443 (DC)

Also nominated: "Night of the Stalker" by Sal Amendola with Vin Amendola, Steve Englehart, and Dick Giordano, Detective Comics #439 (DC); "Red Nails" by Roy Thomas & Barry Smith, Savage Tales #1-3 (Marvel)

- Best Individual Short Story (Dramatic): "Cathedral Perilous" (Manhunter) by Archie Goodwin & Walt Simonson, Detective Comics #441 (DC)

Also nominated: "Burma Sky," by Archie Goodwin & Alex Toth, Our Fighting Forces #146 (DC); "Jenifer" by Bruce Jones & Berni Wrightson, Creepy #63 (Warren)

- Best Writer (Dramatic Division): Archie Goodwin

Also nominated: Steve Gerber, Roy Thomas

- Best Penciller (Dramatic Division): John Buscema

Also nominated: Gene Colan, Berni Wrightson

- Best Inker (Dramatic Division): Dick Giordano

Also nominated: Frank Giacoia; Tom Palmer; Joe Sinnott

- Best Humor Story: "Kaspar the Dead Baby" by Marv Wolfman & Marie Severin Crazy #8 (Marvel)

Also nominated: "The Boob Rube Story" by Stu Schwartzberg & Marie Severin, Crazy #4; "The Ecchorcist" by Marv Wolfman & Vance Rodewalt (Crazy #6); "Police Gory Story" by Stu Schwartzberg & Vance Rodewalt (Crazy #8)

- Best Writer (Humor Division): Steve Skeates

Also nominated: Nick Cuti; Steve Gerber; Joe Gill

- Best Penciller (Humor Division): Marie Severin

Also nominated: Dan DeCarlo; Frank Roberge; George Wildman

- Best Inker (Humor Division): Ralph Reese

Also nominated: Rudy Lapick; Frank Roberge; Marie Severin; George Wildman

- Best Letterer: John Costanza

Also nominated: Annette Kawecki; Gaspar Saladino; Artie Simek

- Best Colorist: Tatjana Wood

Also nominated: Marie Severin; Glynis Wein

- Outstanding New Talent: Craig Russell

Also nominated: Paul Gulacy; Al Milgrom

- Superior Achievement by an Individual: Roy Thomas

Also nominated: Barry Smith; Jim Starlin

- Hall of Fame: Jack Kirby

Also nominated: Alex Toth; Wally Wood

Additional credits where not given in cited source:

== See also ==
- Academy of Comic-Book Fans and Collectors
- Creator ownership
- Alley Award
- Bill Finger Award
- Eagle Awards
- Eisner Award
- Harvey Award
- Inkpot Award
- Kirby Award
- National Comics Award
- Russ Manning Award
