= Swing with Scooter =

DC Comics comic book (1966-1972)

Swing with Scooter is a DC Comics teen-humor American comic book published from 1966 to 1972. It starred a British teenage musician nicknamed Scooter who lived in the US.

== Publication history ==
Swing with Scooter was published by DC Comics for 36 issues (cover-dated July 1966 - Nov. 1972). The series was an attempt at drawing upon the popularity of young British musicians such as the Beatles, and the teen humor market served by Archie Comics. Scooter was created by writers Barbara Friedlander, a writer of DC romance comics, and Jack Miller and artist Joe Orlando.

Henry Scarpelli took over as artist with issue #14, giving the comic a more cartoony, Archie-style look.

The entire DC humor line was cancelled between 1971 and 1972, including Leave It to Binky, Date with Debbi and Swing with Scooter.

== Fictional character biography ==
The protagonist, Scooter, was a British teenage musician who left his band, the Banshees, and moved to Plainsville, USA. His nickname came from the scooter that he used as a vehicle. No last name was given. His supporting characters included Cookie, Kenny, Malibu, and Penny, and in the course of his series, Scooter met extraterrestrials as well as Batman, Superman and other members of the Justice League of America.
