= Stan Fine =

American cartoonist

Stan Fine created this image of himself in 1964 for the back cover of his book, How to Stop Smoking Without Hardly Trying.

Stan Fine (May 24, 1922 - May 21, 2009), was an American gag cartoonist. He contributed to major magazines, signed his work with his full name but sometimes reversed his last name to submit cartoons under the signature Enif.

Born in Pittsburgh, Fine studied at the Philadelphia School of Industrial Art and then launched his cartoon career. His work appeared for decades in a wide variety of publications, including The American Magazine, Cartoon Spice, Collier's, Good Housekeeping, Look, National Enquirer, National Lampoon, The Saturday Evening Post and Woman's World.

== King Features ==
For a year in the mid-1960s, he entered into newspaper syndication with Art Linkletter's Kids, a daily gag panel featuring a cast of child characters—Klunkhead, Powder Puff, Specs Webster and Terry the Terror. Distributed by King Features Syndicate, the series began November 4, 1963 and continued until October 1964. He also worked on the syndicated Hazel, as recalled by Ted Key's son, Peter Key:

When Curtis Publishing went into bankruptcy, my father obtained the rights to Hazel from it and worked out a deal under which he wrote and drew six Hazel cartoons a week for King Features Syndicate, which syndicated them to newspapers across the country. My father hired cartoonist Stan Fine to ink his drawings. I wrote gags for him for an eight-year period, but he still turned out six new Hazel cartoons a week until he retired in 1993. King Features still syndicates Hazel to newspapers, but the cartoons are ones that appeared before.

Before moving to Florida, Fine's studio was at 125 Montgomery Avenue in Bala Cynwyd, Pennsylvania, where he lived with his wife, the former Irene Fox. Between sessions at the drawing board, Fine found time for his hobbies, woodworking, golf and reinventing himself as a cartoonist.

Fine used the services of several gagwriters, including Terry Wampler. In later years, Fine's most prolific work appeared in the pages of several men's magazines, most notably Hustler. The days of old school cartoonists had passed and Fine found a new home in the "adult" market - Hustler in particular, where the perfect medium came into play with Fine regularly drawing single page cartoons depicting (among other things) devious little kids, a far cry from the familial tapestry woven into Hazel. Many of his associates knew in actuality they were references to his estranged son whom Stan wrote an angst-laden letter to in 1982, an internal struggle in which Stan battled during his final years in Florida. The other side of Stan's iconic humor was found in Wampler's contributions, acknowledged in one National Enquirer cartoon showing kids in Halloween costumes, outside a darkened house, saying, "We know you're in there, Mr. Wampler, so turn on the light and come out with your hands full."

== Books ==
Books with Fine's byline include How to Stop Smoking Without Hardly Trying (Gem Publishing, 1964) which displayed "16 detachable jumbo picture postcards". His cartoons were reprinted in many collections, including The Little Monsters (Ace, 1956) and the hardcover You've Got Me in the Suburbs (Dodd Mead, 1957), cartoons about commuters and suburbanites, edited by Lawrence Lariar. Fine was often represented in Lariar's Best Cartoons of the Year annuals.

His work is in the Daniel McCormick Collection at Wayne State University.
