= Leave It to Binky =

DC comic book series

Leave It to Binky is a teen-humor comic book series created by Sheldon Mayer and published by DC Comics that ran for 82 issues, first appearing in 1948 and wrapping up in 1977.

== Publication history ==
The adventures of teenager Binky Biggs started in DC Comics' Leave It to Binky #1 (cover-dated March 1948), which ran for 60 issues through 1958. The artist Bob Oksner, who said he worked on the series from the beginning until its 1958 cancellation, recounted, "The drawing was created by me, but the characters and the concept were created by Shelly Mayer. ... In those days, the concept of a 'teenager'—which had never existed before World War II—suddenly came into being. There were quite a few teenage strips on the market, syndicated strips. The whole market opened up for the teenagers ... Shelly was brilliant and had done Scribbly [the Boy Cartoonist]. Binky was a little older version of Scribbly, more of a teenage focus of a Scribbly." Scribbly appeared in some issues as a backup feature.

The series was revived in Showcase #70 (Sept 1967), which was popular enough to bring the series back, resuming with issue #61 in July 1968. With issue #72 (May 1970), the title was shortened to Binky and the series ran until issue #81 (Nov. 1971). The entire DC humor line was cancelled between 1971 and 1972, including Leave It to Binky, Date with Debbi and Swing with Scooter.

The comic was briefly revived for issue #82 in Summer 1977.

A spin-off title, Binky's Buddies, ran 12 issues (Feb. 1969 - Dec. 1970).

== Awards ==
Artist Henry Scarpelli won a 1970 Shazam Award for Best Inker (Humor Division) for his work on this series, Date With Debbi, and other DC comics.
