= Reamer Keller =

American cartoonist

- Born: January 11, 1905 Virginia, U.S.
- Died: January 17, 1994 (aged 89) Palm Beach, Florida, U.S.
- Area: Cartoonist
- Notable works: Addle-essence; Pedro; Kennesaw; Medicare
- Children: 2

Charles Reamer Keller (January 11, 1905 – January 17, 1994), better known as Reamer Keller, was an American cartoonist. He often drew 50 cartoons a week and routinely published a thousand cartoons annually for decades.

== Biography ==
=== Early life and education ===
Born in Virginia between the Massanuttan and Blue Ridge Mountains, Keller grew up at 1919 Baird Avenue in Portsmouth, Ohio, where his father, Harvey F. Keller (1867-1958), was a machinist with the Norfolk & Western Railway shops until his 1940 retirement. The young Reamer Keller honed his art abilities during employment in Portsmouth at the Compton Engraving & Printing Company.

Keller studied architecture at the University of Cincinnati, continuing with that as his major at Ohio State University, where he was a member of the Alpha Rho Chi architectural fraternity and contributed to the school's magazine. After he sold his first cartoon to The Columbus Citizen, he took a job in the newspaper's art department. In addition to a job with The Ohio State Journal, he also worked with architectural firms, with labor gangs and on the Cincinnati suspension bridge. He left Columbus to travel about the country, eventually returning to Portsmouth.

=== Cartoon marketing and marriage ===
Leaving Ohio in 1930, Keller relocated to Staten Island, began making gag cartoon sales to major New York magazines and married his Brooklyn-born wife in 1934. By 1937, the couple had two children (plus pigeons, chickens, ducks and rabbits). Working under a self-imposed schedule, Keller spent two days at the drawing board and three days making rounds to sell his cartoons. He recalled, "I was always deluged with requests for the original drawing. To an artist this is positive proof that you have produced a good, funny cartoon— one that has been right on target."

He returned to Portsmouth to spend a week with his father in 1946, one of many annual visits. Keller and his wife remodeled their Atlantic Highlands, New Jersey home in 1950, which was described as being the highest home along the East Coast of the United States. Living in Rumson, New Jersey, during the 1960s and 1970s, the couple sold the Portsmouth family house at 1919 Baird Avenue in 1970. During the 1980s, Keller moved to 4500 Ocean Boulevard in South Palm Beach, Florida. Retiring in the 1990s, he lived in Naples, Florida. He died in Palm Beach in 1994.

== Career ==
=== Magazines ===
Keller contributed to College Humor, Collier's, Dude, Esquire, Forbes, Gee-Whiz, Judge, Liberty, Life, McCall's, The New Yorker, Pageant, Playboy, Reader's Digest, The Saturday Evening Post, This Week and many other magazines. For Family Weekly he drew the cartoon feature Addle-essence about teenagers, and another series was Pedro for Boys' Life.

Collier's cartoon editor Gurney Williams wrote about Keller's wacky sculpture constructions:

The onrushing Christmas season brings to mind some of the goofy gifts we've received from cartoonist Reamer Keller, whose newest wheeze is reproduced on page 66 and whose Collier's-born hillbilly feature, Kennesaw, will be released as a daily newspaper strip come December 7th. One yuletide yak was a horseshoe equipped with six-inch stilts: "For ponies," Keller explained, "who want to be as tall as horses." There have been other Noel nifties of this ilk, but Keller rang the eight bell with his unhandy but decorative Combination Lighter & Ash Tray, fashioned from a life-size lingerie-shop dummy. Glued atop the dummy's truncated torso is a box of kitchen matches; fastened just above her right knee is the ash tray. Still and all, as we keep saying, cartoonists aren't unhinged. Anyway, some of them aren't.

=== Syndication ===
In the early 1950s, Keller began Kennesaw in Collier's and then expanded this series of hillbilly characters as a comic strip, launched December 7, 1953. Distributed by the Chicago Tribune-New York News Syndicate, Kennesaw ran until 1955. In 1966, he launched his gag panel series Medicare about doctors and nurses. Keller explained why he started this series, "I found that invariably whenever I did a cartoon about doctors, nurses and their patients, there would be an immediate reaction." Medicare ran until 1975, syndicated by Field Enterprises.

== Books ==
His books include Why the Long Puss? (Bantam, 1956) and Mating Manual (Bantam, 1957).
