= 1931 in comics =

Notable events of 1931 in comics.

== Events and publications ==
=== January ===
- January 7: Kho Wang Gie's comic strip Put On makes its debut and will continue for 30 years.
- January 19: The first episode of the Mickey Mouse story Mickey Mouse Vs. Kat Nipp by Floyd Gottfredson is published. Kat Nipp, already Mickey’s antagonist in some animated shorts, makes his comics debut in this story.
- January 21: After the death of C. W. Kahles, the comic strip Hairbreadth Harry is continued by F.O. Alexander.

=== February ===
- February 26: The first episode of the Mickey Mouse story Boxing champion by Floyd Gottfredson is published, which marks the debut of Gideon Goat.
- February 28: The final gag of Harold C. Earnshaw's newspaper comic strip The Pater is published.

=== March ===
- March 23: The first episode of Roland J. Scott's long-running newspaper comic Scott's Scrapbook is published, which will continue up until 1967.

=== April ===
- April 17: In E.C. Segar's Thimble Theatre Popeye first quotes his classic line: "I yam what I yam an' tha's all I yam."

=== May ===
- May 3: In E.C. Segar's Thimble Theatre a prototypical version of J. Wellington Wimpy makes his debut.

=== June ===
- June 26: In E.C. Segar's Thimble Theatre spinach is introduced as the source of Popeye's power.

=== July ===
- July 8: In a Mickey Mouse comic by Floyd Gottfredson’s, a stray dog eats Mickey Mouse’s ice-cream. This is the first time Pluto makes his debut.

=== September ===
- September 2: In Le petit Vingtième, first chapter of Tintin in America, by Hergè.

=== October ===
- October 4: Chester Gould's Dick Tracy makes his debut. It naturally marks the debut of the protagonist, Dick Tracy.
- October 11: In Dick Tracy the villain Big Boy makes his debut.
- October 12: In Dick Tracy his girlfriend Tess Trueheart makes her debut.
- October 16: In the first narrative of Dick Tracy the father of Tess Trueheart is murdered, which is the first instance of a cold-blooded murder appearing uncensored in a comic strip.

=== November ===
- November 27: The final issue of the Spanish comics magazine Pinocho is published.

=== December ===
- December 26: The first episode of the biblical text comic Illustrated Sunday School Lesson is published. It will run until 26 February 1973.

=== Specific date unknown ===
- Edwina Dumm's Alec the Great makes its debut and will run until 1969.
- Suihō Tagawa's Norakuro makes its debut.
- The final episode of Doings of the Duffs is published. The last artist to draw it is Buford Tune.
- Jean Bruller publishes his comic strip Le Mariage de Monsieur Lakonik.
- Henri Bruneau publishes Zbib et Barnabé.
- William Ferguson publishes This Curious World (1931-1952).
- Louis Diamond publishes Mick.
- Hergé publishes Fred & Mille in Mon Avenir, which will be continued by François Gianolla a year later.
- Guglielmo Guastaveglia creates early Italian versions of Mickey Mouse and Felix the Cat.
- Captain Roscoe Fawcett and Bruno Thompson's Screen Oddities, a daily comic about the lives of Hollywood stars, is first published.

== Births ==
=== April ===
- April 10: Gérald Forton, Belgian-American comic artist (Kim Devil, continued Bob Morane, He-Man, Masters of the Universe newspaper comic), (d. 2021).

=== August ===
- August 12: Luis Bermejo, Spanish comics artist and illustrator (Apache, continued Heros the Spartan and Johnny Future), (d. 2015).

=== September ===
- September 17: Jean-Claude Carrière, French novelist, actor, screenwriter and comics writer (wrote comics for Bernard Yslaire and Pierre Étaix), (d. 2021).
- September 22: E. Nelson Bridwell, American comic book writer (DC Comics, Mad), (d. 1987).

=== October ===
- October 2: Enzo Facciolo, Italian animator and comics artist (Clint Due Colpi, worked on Diabolik), (d. 2021).

=== Specific date unknown ===
- Zoe Skiadaresi, Greek comics artist (Bampoudas), (d. 2014).

== Deaths ==
=== January ===
- January 21: C. W. Kahles, German-American comics artist (Hairbreadth Harry), dies at age 63 from a heart attack.

=== May ===
- May 7: Louis De Leeuw, Dutch illustrator, painter, cartoonist, lithographer and comic artist, dies at age 55.
- May 19: Ralph Barton, American caricaturist, cartoonist and comics artist (worked for The New Yorker), commits suicide at age 39.
- May 28: Guydo, French comics artist, illustrator and novelist, dies at age 62.

=== June ===
- June 6: Herbert Bird Tourtel, British journalist, poet and comics writer (Rupert Bear), husband of Mary Tourtel, dies at age 57.

=== July ===
- July 11: Jean-Louis Forain, a.k.a. Louis-Henri Forain, French illustrator, painter and comics artist, dies at age 78.

=== August ===
- August 25: Marcel Arnac, French novelist, illustrator, comics writer and artist (Les Désopilantes Aventures de Trouillet Détective and other one-shot comics), dies at age 44 in an accident.

=== September ===
- September 15: Jacques Marie Gaston Onfroy de Bréville, a.k.a. Job, French illustrator, caricaturist and painter, dies at age 72.
