= Morrie Brickman =

Comics artist (1917–1994)

- Born: July 24, 1917 Chicago, Illinois, U.S.
- Died: March 15, 1994 (aged 76) Evanston, Illinois, U.S.
- Area: Cartoonist
- Notable works: The Small Society
- Spouse: Shirley Kronenthal (m. 1945)
- Children: Harriet Brickman Raredon and Paul Brickman

Morrie Brickman (July 24, 1917 – March 15, 1994) was an American cartoonist. His nationally syndicated comic strip The Small Society was published in over 300 papers, including 35 foreign publications.

== Biography ==
Brickman was born in Chicago, Illinois. His career as an artist began slowly, as he worked odd jobs selling and repairing shoes, as a housekeeper for Esquire illustrator John Groth, and an advertising designer. With the money saved from this work, Brickman took classes at the School of the Art Institute of Chicago. Brickman was a commercial artist, creating illustrations for many companies. His most recognizable is Mr. Yoyo, the brand character for Duncan yoyos. He also wrote and illustrated books, including Don't Do It Yourself, about home repair.

Brickman created the acclaimed semi-autobiographical comic strip The Small Society in 1966, which ran in over 300 publications worldwide, distributed by the Washington Star Syndicate. According to his daughter, Harriet, the main character "Mensch was my father's alter-ego" and "Not incidentally, Mensch's wife's name was Shirl, the same as my mother's." In his profile in the July 1955 issue of Popular Science, he noted that his home workshop was the source of many of his cartoons. When he retired in 1985, the strip continued with art and script by Bill Yates. Brickman wrote a play entitled Coming of Age based on his experiences after finishing The Small Society.

Brickman married Shirley Kronenthal in 1945 and had two children: Harriet Brickman Raredon and Risky Business writer/director Paul Brickman. He died in Evanston, Illinois, on March 15, 1994.
