= Robert Baldwin (cartoonist) =

American cartoonist (1914–1977)

- Robert Baldwin at work on Freddy inside his traveling studio during the early 1960s.
- Born: 1914 Washington, D. C., U.S.
- Died: 1977 (aged 62–63)
- Area: Cartoonist
- Pseudonym: Rupe
- Notable works: Freddy
- Spouse: Helen L. Baldwin

Robert G. Baldwin (1914–1977) was an American cartoonist. He used the signature Rupe, and was best known for his comic strip Freddy, about a goofy kid.

== Biography ==
=== Education and early career ===
Baldwin studied painting at Washington's Corcoran School of Art. Instead of entering the field of fine art, however, he supported himself with government work and advertising art. His cartoon illustrations led him into minor comic book artwork, contributing to Prize Comics and Spook Comics.

=== Freddy ===
Robert Baldwin's Freddy (October 14, 1956)

In the early 1950s, Baldwin and his wife, music teacher Helen L. Baldwin (1913–1998), were living in the Far East, where he worked for the Central Intelligence Agency, when they created the comic strip Freddy about a little boy named Freddy J. McReady. As he drew, she wrote gags for the strip, which was loosely based on their children. In 1955, he left the CIA and concentrated on the strip, using a loose brush ink style to draw his chubby child. Eventually published in 100 newspapers, it ran from 1955 to 1980, distributed by the George Matthew Adams Service and later The Washington Star Syndicate and Field Enterprises.

In 1964, Baldwin described his working methods:

Although I sign my work "Rupe", my real name is Robert G. Baldwin, and I was born in Washington, D.C. I’m 50 years old, and I have five children, ages 11 to 22. Four boys and one girl. Frequently the family gathers around my finished work for discussion and, I hope, for a good laugh. I received my formal art training at the Corcoran Art School in Washington, D.C. Then I spent several years as a hungry "fine" artist. To eat regularly, I was in and out of government several times. When out, I worked on comic books and did advertising. Mostly, I work at home in a small upstairs, enclosed back porch complete with bath. I also have a drawing board set up in the back of a small "bus" which I drive around town. Each panel of a Freddy daily strip is ruled off to 5 1/2 inches square. I use a No. 4 sable brush. I always try to get several good ideas at a time, and I can comfortably do three or four strips each day.

The appeal of Freddy and his friends was that they acted like real children, often hyperactive. In 1969, a curious attempt to make the character slightly older and less childlike backfired, as evident in an April 30, 1969 statement by Harry E. Elmlark of the Washington Star Syndicate:

During recent months Robert Baldwin (Rupe), the creator of the comic strip Freddy, in a sincere desire to improve the strip and make it even more desirable, changed the appearance of the characters, making them more conventional. There have been complaints, from readers, the number of which pleased and surprised us, and subscribers. They want the "old Freddy." Therefore, starting with the release of no later than June 6 Freddy and his "associates" will look as they did during these last ten years. The old Freddy will be back.

During the 1960s, Baldwin's assistant was Howard Rands, who drew his own strip, Twitch, during the 1970s. Born in Geneva, New York, Rands studied at the Abbott Art School, was in the U. S. Merchant Marine and illustrated several Air Force magazines.

The Baldwins lived in Washington, D.C. Robert Baldwin died in 1977, and Helen Baldwin died March 14, 1998, from Lou Gehrig's disease.

== Books ==
Comic Preserves did a 64-page book collection of the Freddy daily strips that ran from May to October in 1956. Dell's Freddy comic book, which ran for three issues in 1963–64, was not by Baldwin but was drawn by Bob Gustafson.
