= Morris Weiss =

American comics artist

- Morris Weiss in 2006
- Born: Morris S. Weiss; August 11, 1915 Philadelphia, Pennsylvania, U.S.
- Died: May 18, 2014 (aged 98)
- Areas: Artist, writer
- Pseudonym: Ink Higgins
- Notable works: "Margie", Mickey Finn

Morris S. Weiss (August 11, 1915 – May 18, 2014) was an American comic book and comic strip artist and writer. Active from the 1930s through the mid-1970s, he created the teen-comedy character Margie for Timely Comics, the 1940s predecessor of Marvel Comics, and was the final cartoonist on the comic strip Mickey Finn. He also worked as a writer or illustrator on numerous other strips, including Joe Palooka.

== Biography ==
=== Early life and career ===
Morris Weiss was born in 1915 Philadelphia, Pennsylvania, and grew up in New York City, New York, where he studied sign-painting as a vocational elective in high school. He broke into the comics field in 1934 with brief stints as the letterer for the comic strip Minute Movies by Ed Wheelan, and as an assistant on the Joe Jinks comic strip; in the early 1940s, United Features Syndicate hired him to draw Joe Jinks. Between 1934 and 1936 he lettered for Harold Knerr on the comic strip The Katzenjammer Kids. At the same time he also worked as an "opaquer" for Fleischer Studios. In 1940 Weiss created the syndicated comic strip It Never Fails, but asked to be released from his contract the following year, explaining later, "I never was a good gag man....I can come up with a gag here and there, but not on a steady basis." That same year he attended the Art Students League of New York in order to study figure drawing with George Bridgman; future fellow cartoonists in the same class were Bob Lubbers and Stan Drake.

Weiss was the inker and assistant on cartoonist Lank Leonard's Mickey Finn from 1936 to 1943, and again from 1960 on. He took over the strip following Leonard's retirement in 1968, continuing through the final Sunday strip on December 21, 1975, and the daily strip's finale on July 31, 1976.

Following his first stint with Mickey Finn, Weiss transitioned to comic books. His earliest known credit there is as penciler and inker of the six-page feature "Boxie Weaver" in Holyoke Publications' Blue Beetle #28-30 (Dec. 1943 - Feb. 1944) and Sparkling Stars #9 (Feb. 1945), the last of which he signed with the pseudonym Ink Higgins. Other early Weiss features for Holyoke include "Private Plopp" and "Petey and Pop". While in the army in 1944 and 1945, Weiss was the staff artist for the camp newspaper at Fort Eustis in Newport News, Virginia, where he wrote and drew the comic panel M.P. Muffit. In 1946, he did his first known work for Timely Comics, the 1940s forerunner of Marvel Comics, writing and drawing the title character's stories in the career-gal humor comic Tessie the Typist. He went on to do numerous stories featuring Tessie and her friend Skidsy, and created the teen-humor feature "Margie", which ran in Margie Comics, Georgie Comics and Patsy Walker. About this time Weiss was contacted separately by both Joe Shuster and Jerry Siegel, the creators of Superman, each of whom were interested in collaborating with him on a comic strip.

At various times Weiss turned down opportunities to continue strips such as Terry and the Pirates and Nancy after the departure of their creators. He occasionally assisted Al Smith on Mutt and Jeff. In 1955, he began drawing the Adventures of Pinky Lee, a comic written by Stan Lee. Weiss wrote the dramatic continuity for Joe Palooka from about 1962 to 1970, with Tony DiPreta drawing the strip.

Weiss befriended a host of notable artists, including James Montgomery Flagg, who drew Weiss's portrait, Charles Voight, Milton Caniff, Ernie Bushmiller, and Edwina Dumm. As a member of the National Cartoonists Society, he proposed the idea of a charity fund for members experiencing hard times, which Alex Raymond developed into the Milt Gross Fund for Indigent Cartoonists. A collector of American illustration, he purchased a painting in 1947 from Norman Rockwell for $150.

=== Later life ===
In 1960, Weiss and his family moved to North Miami, Florida. With his artist wife, Blanche, whom he met in George Bridgman's class at the Art Students League of New York and married in 1944, Weiss founded the Miami Society for Autistic Children. As president of the MSAC in the 1970s, he arranged fund-raising events that were emceed by Larry King, and featured celebrities. The couple had four children: daughter Wendy and sons Jacob, David and Jerry Weiss, an artist. Weiss died at his home in West Palm Beach, Florida, on May 18, 2014.
