= Walt Mason =

Canadian-American journalist and writer

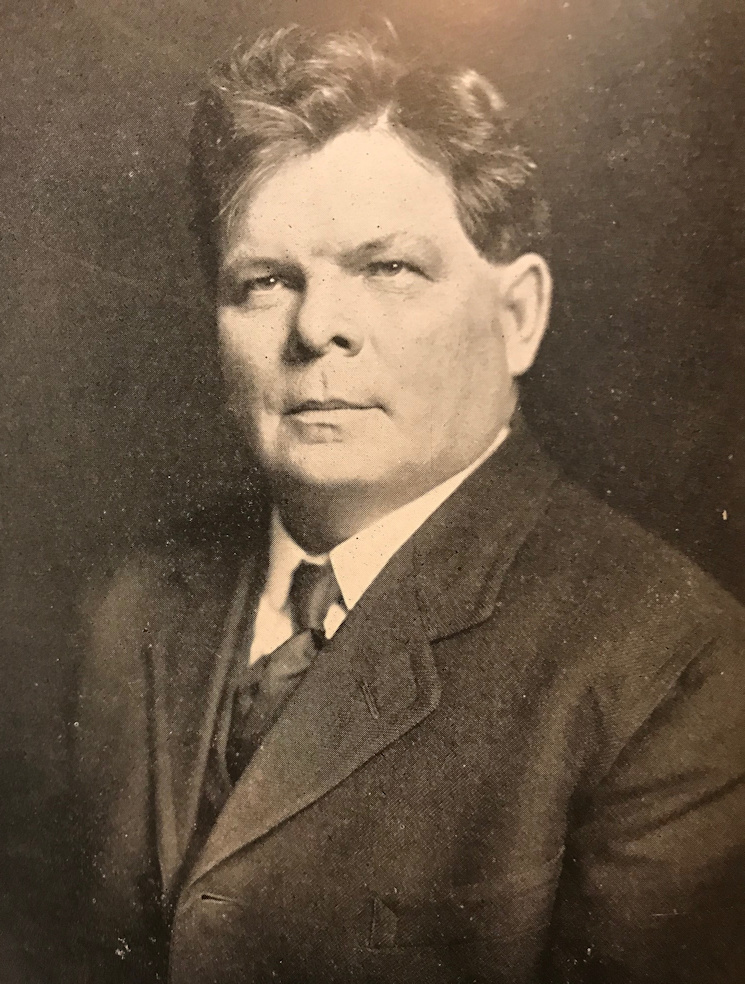
- Mason in a 1916 publication
- Born: Walter S. Mason; May 4, 1862; Columbus, Canada West
- Died: June 22, 1939 (aged 77); La Jolla, California, U.S.
- Occupations: Journalist, Writer, Poet
- Years active: 1881-1939
- Known for: Rippling Rhymes
- Notable work: Uncle Walt, Horse Sense, Terse Verse
- Spouse: Ella Foss (m. 1893; died 1936)
- Children: 2

Walt Mason (May 4, 1862 – June 22, 1939) was a Canadian-born American journalist and writer, whose daily column was syndicated by George Matthew Adams in over 200 US and Canadian newspapers during the early part of the 20th Century.

He was called "the poet laureate of common sense", and the "Homer of modern America", but referred to himself as "the Fat One". His columns were collected into eight books of "prose poems" between 1910 and 1919, for which admirers such as Theodore Dreiser, James Whitcomb Riley, William Dean Howells, Arthur Conan Doyle, George Ade, and Mary Roberts Rinehart wrote laudatory testimonials.

== Early years ==
He was born in Columbus, Canada West, the sixth of seven sons (Note: The anonymous profile of Mason written for Lumber Lyrics in 1919 says he was the fifth of six sons, but Canadian census records from 1861 and 1871 show he had five older brothers (William, Frederick, James, Charles, Andrew) and one younger (John).) for John Mason, an English-born Welsh wool-sorter and Lydia Sarah Campbell, a Quebec-born housewife of Scottish background. The family were members of the United Presbyterian Church. He was four when his father died in an accident at the factory where he and his brothers would later be employed. Like his older brothers, Mason became an apprentice weaver around twelve years of age. He suffered lifelong partial deafness from a swimming incident at age thirteen. His mother died when he was fifteen, after which he went to Port Hope, Ontario and worked in a hardware store.

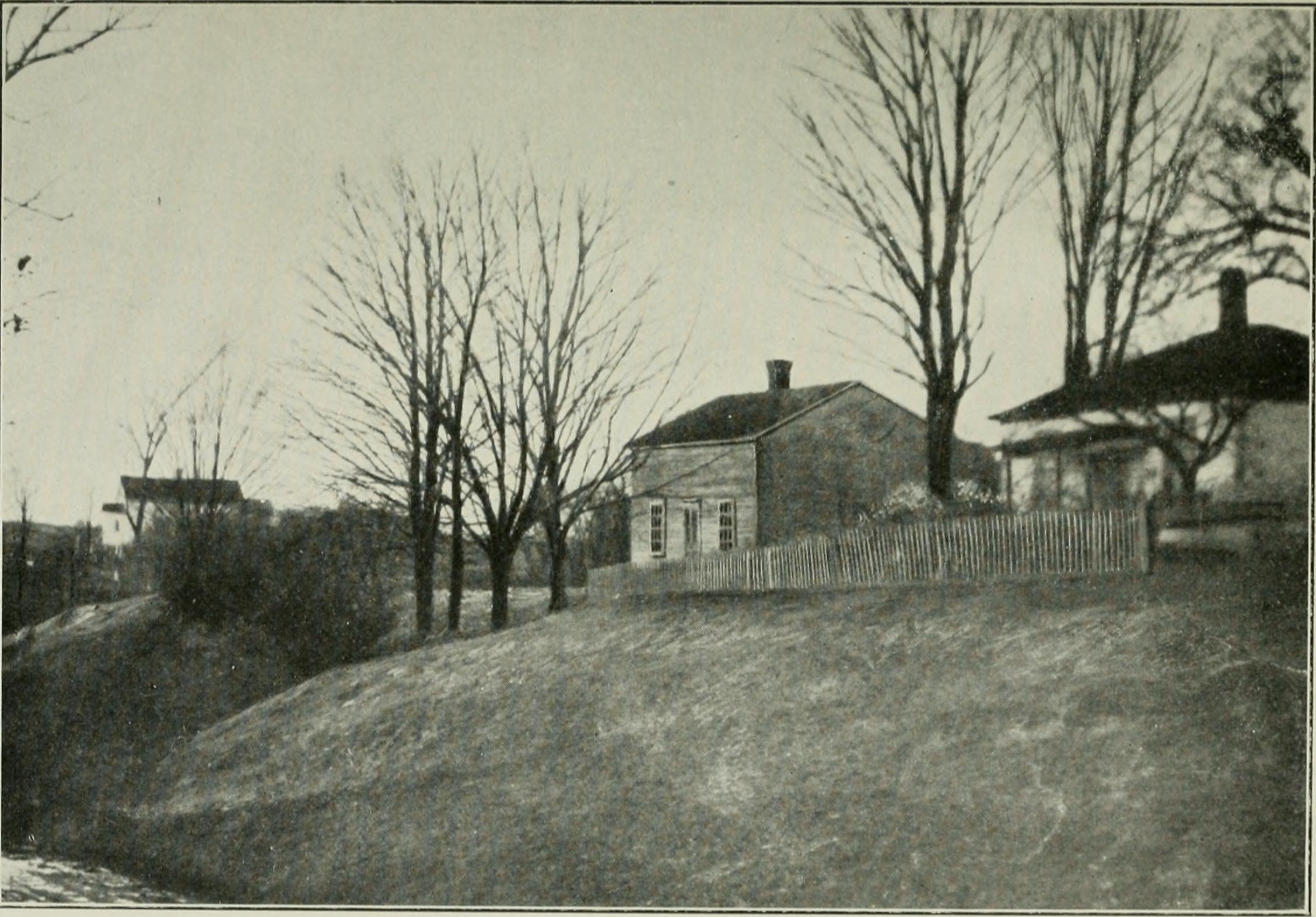
Walt Mason's birthplace in Columbus, Ontario

== Arrival in America ==
Mason moved to upstate New York about the time he turned 18 in 1880. He worked on farms then drifted to the Midwest, landing in St. Louis, Missouri. There he got a job running a printing press for a short-lived humor magazine called The St. Louis Hornet. He also contributed writings to it, and became well known enough in the local area for an Illinois newspaper to quote him in 1881. When the magazine folded Mason moved on to Frankfort, Kansas (Note: His brother Charles was already living there, and his brothers Andrew and James would in time move there as well.) where he rode the range as a cowhand.

== Early journalism ==
A weekly paper began publishing original poems by Walt Mason during October 1884. Mason wrote a series called "Poems in Paranthesis[sic]" during October and November 1884 for The Frankfort Bee, one appearing each week. The editors indicated that besides writing poetry in his spare time, Mason was also a cartoonist. These poems were in trochaic pentameter, with the ending of every other line rhyming; Mason hadn't yet created the "prose poem" style for which he would later become famous. Mason's remuneration from The Frankfort Bee, if any, isn't known. Through December 1884 Mason submitted both poems (Note: The poem Life and Death varied from his usual comic subject matter and employed a different metrical structure.) and prose pieces to The Frankfort Bee. One of the latter, Riding a Texas Pony, was picked up and reprinted by other newspapers, including The Leavenworth Times.

Later legend had it that Mason had submitted a poem to Col. Dan Anthony, editor of The Leavenworth Times, received $5 for it, and immediately went to work for the paper as a reporter at $8 a week. During February 1885, the newspaper started running a serialized straight prose work by Mason called Rough Times, a humorous account of life in a boarding house. The Frankfort Bee reported in February that Mason was on the staff of The Leavenworth Times, and by early March was its telegraph editor.

== Boom and bust cycle ==
Mason "severed connections" with The Leavenworth Times in late May 1885, and by early June was employed by Edward Howe at The Atchison Globe. Within six months he was city editor of the paper, while continuing to write original prose and poetry for it and other Kansas papers. After one year he left the Globe under murky circumstances (Note: Many Kansas newspapers reported he was going to the Chicago Herald, only for the Globe to correct them while referring to him as the "late" Walt Mason. His new position was definitely a come down from having been second-in-charge of a daily paper.) for the St. Louis Whip, an illustrated weekly where he was an assistant editor, writing advertising jingles. This was an early instance of what Walt Mason later wrote was a cyclical occurrence in his life:

"I would equip myself with a good suit of clothes, and purple and fine linen, and become obtrusively respectable, and then of a sudden would come a great longing for the gilded saloon and the company of people who drank not wisely but too well. Then, poof! away would fly all the excellent resolutions, and I'd wake up some fine morning in a livery stable to find my raiment was in the pawnshop and that I couldn't remember whether it was Wednesday or the Chinese New Year."

In such fashion Mason moved from newspaper to newspaper until he was able to shake the booze habit for good, which he attributed to the Keeley Cure. His only novel, The Man Who Sobered Up (1893) was written in celebration of this personal triumph. By this time Mason was working on the Evening News in Washington, D.C.

Returning to his small dairy farm in Beatrice, Nebraska, he tried running his own Saturday Summary newspaper during 1905–1906, but ran afoul of the postal authorities, who concluded it was little more than an advertising sheet and forbade its use of the mail for delivery. By January 1907 he was back "doing a special stint" writing editorials for the Beatrice Daily Express under the column name Side Issues. He had no position with the Express, rather he was living "in comparative retirement" as one Kansas paper reported. He had by this time developed his unique style, prose sprinkled with rhymes, which he used for a widely printed sermon on drinking.

By April 1907 Mason had taken an editorial position with the Atchison Champion, which had just converted from weekly to daily publication. This lasted until July when he resigned, to edit a new literary and social weekly in Atchison. But after three weeks his partner bought out his share of the start-up, (Note: Fortunately for Mason, since the paper soon failed and the partner skipped town owing money.) and Mason wrote a column called Mosaics in the Topeka Daily Capital for a few weeks.

== Rise to fame ==
When Mason came to Emporia, Kansas in early October 1907 he was forty-five and a disillusioned man. The editor William Allen White had invited Mason to take a job with the already nationally prominent Emporia Gazette. Mason's writing was well known in Nebraska and Kansas, but hadn't reached other parts of the country. Within two weeks of starting at the Gazette other Kansas newspapers noted the improvement in its editorial pages. After one month, Mrs. Mason, still living on their farm in Beatrice, Nebraska, joined him in Emporia. The Topeka State Journal observed in December that Mason, who was telegraph editor, had been "writing doggeral rhymes as heads for the big news stories". A later anecdote held that his prose poems first appeared in the Gazette when the city editor was shy a daily local-interest piece called the "star head", (Note: So called because it appeared at the top of page 1 surrounded on all sides by a border of asterisks.) and asked Mason to fill in with something. Mason obliged and the poem he wrote got picked up by the New York Daily News, bringing him to the attention of Eastern readers.

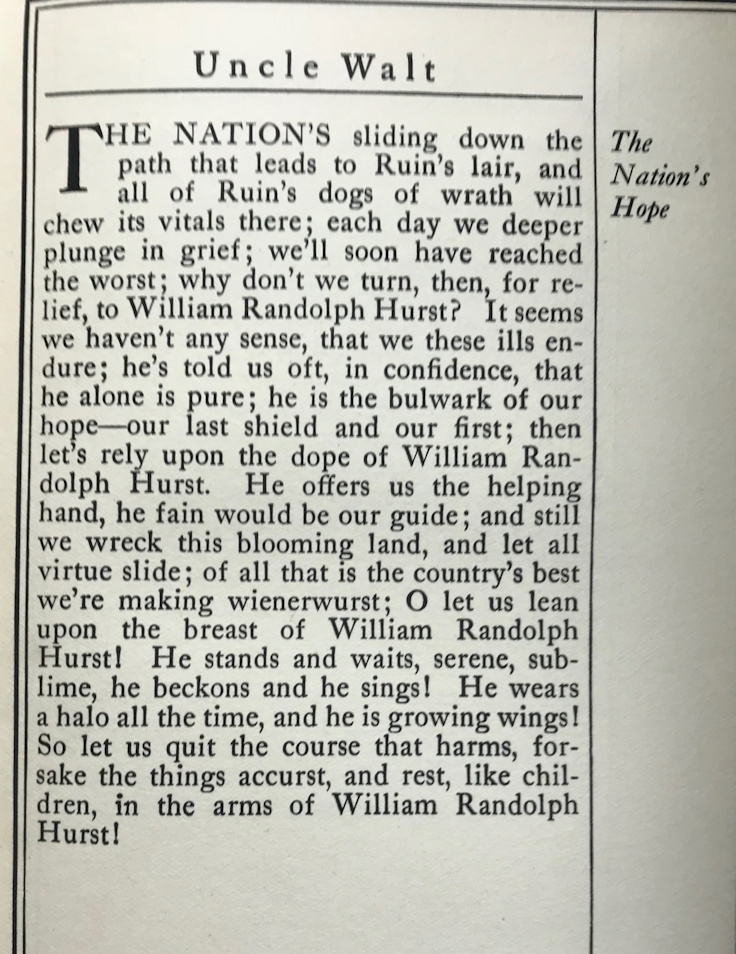
The Nation's Hope

Mason's prose poems were in later times often remembered for their sentiment and gentle humor, but he also wrote satires. Two of his victims were William Randolph Hearst, whom he skewered in The Nation's Hope, and the little town of Iola, Kansas, to which he attributed a propensity for crime, scandal, and violence, all out of proportion to its size, in Quiet At Iola. Hearst's reaction is unknown, while the newspapers of Iola were split: the Iola Daily Record reprinted it, but the Iola Daily Index railed about the poem and criticized other Kansas newspapers that reprinted it as being "edited from Emporia".

For Memorial Day of 1908 Mason wrote a prose poem called Little Green Tents that appeared in the "star head" of the Gazette, that is often cited as one of his best. A work of gentle melancholy, it portrayed the graves of American Civil War soldiers and the surviving veterans as both worthy of remembrance. The following February, he wrote another such poem, called The Eyes of Lincoln, to mark Lincoln's Birthday. Also celebrated as a fine example of his work, it was the first Mason poem offered for national syndication by George Matthew Adams.

== Syndication ==
The Adams Newspaper Service had already signed Mason's boss, William Allen White, to write a political column for syndication in 1908. Adams approached White at a political convention, showed him some clippings of Mason's work from the Gazette, and asked if he thought Mason would agree to syndication. White said sure, Mason would love it, so Adams signed him on at $18 a week to start. The column was titled Uncle Walt of Kansas starting in early 1909, which one local editor thought a disservice to Mason. The same editor mentioned that the syndicate would be copyrighting Mason's work; prior to this other papers had copied Mason's stuff without paying him much, if anything.

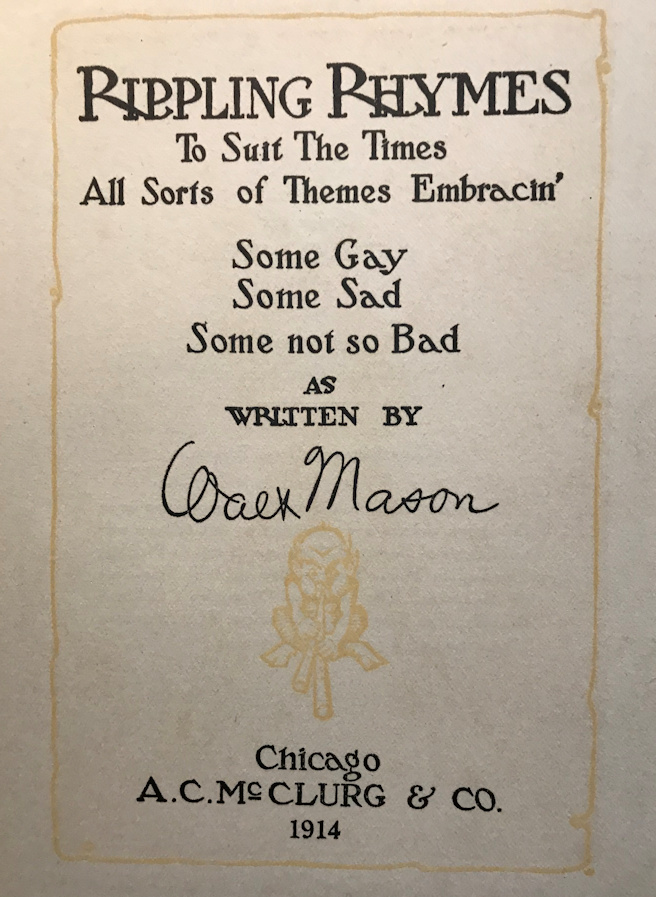

According to Adams, some editors in other parts of the country objected to the "Kansas" in the column's title, so it was renamed that same year to just Uncle Walt, Poet and Philosopher, or Uncle Walt On.... whatever the subject matter of the poem was. Not until October 1914 did the column become Rippling Rhymes, after the title of Mason's fifth published book.

Mason had a young colleague on the Emporia Gazette named Brock Pemberton, who wrote a profile of the man who was "Uncle Walt". Pemberton described him as a pudgy, dark-haired and dark-eyed fellow, who dressed casually in the office and was always smoking a pipe. He banged out his columns on a typewriter in a tiny room at the Gazette office, and when resting would place his hands on his ample waistline. He was passionately fond of horses, baseball, and music, and had an inclination towards pranking his colleagues and bosses. But his defining characteristic was an aptitude for creative work:

The most remarkable thing about this man, who perhaps writes for a larger reading public than any other writer... is his ability to write as much as he does. He has an inordinate capacity for work. He does not have to wait for his divine afflatus to come to him, for it is always with him. An event of the day demands a prose poem, and a few minutes work at the machine... produces it, without need of revision and such accurate and clean copy as to delight the editor's eye.

Pemberton also revealed the extent of mail pouring into the Gazette office from admirers of "Uncle Walt", from all parts of North America and overseas. His readers numbered in the millions; they encompassed both the famous and "the ordinary men and women of the crowd". The letters were often simply addressed to "Uncle Walt" or "The Fat One", which pleased Mason.

== Books ==
Adams collected some of Mason's syndicated work into a book called Uncle Walt, published in Chicago during November 1910. Like the newspaper columns, the book was copyrighted to Adams, not Mason. By that time Mason was earning $50 a week from syndication plus $30 weekly from a separate arrangement with the Chicago News. Combined with his Emporia Gazette salary, editor William Allen White estimated Mason's monthly income at $500. The steady income allowed Mason to build a custom-designed home on one of the first paved streets in Emporia, a house which he referred to as his "igloo", and later came to be on the National Register of Historic Places.

Adams followed up in 1911 with Walt Mason's Business Prose Poems, a collection of custom advertising jingles and product homages written by Mason, some to the order of trade publications. Mason's best-known book was Rippling Rhymes, published in October 1913. The first page contained remarks by many well-known writers about Mason's prose poems. George Ade called Mason "the high priest of horse sense", Sir Arthur Conan Doyle pronounced him "delightful", while James Whitcomb Riley enthused over the "facetious, capricious, delicious poems of Walt Mason". Mary Roberts Rinehart explained "I have Walt Mason and coffee every morning, and one is as necessary as the other, but coffee gives me heartburn and Walt doesn't". Theodore Dreiser recounted how Mason had enlivened "many a dreary railway journey" for him.

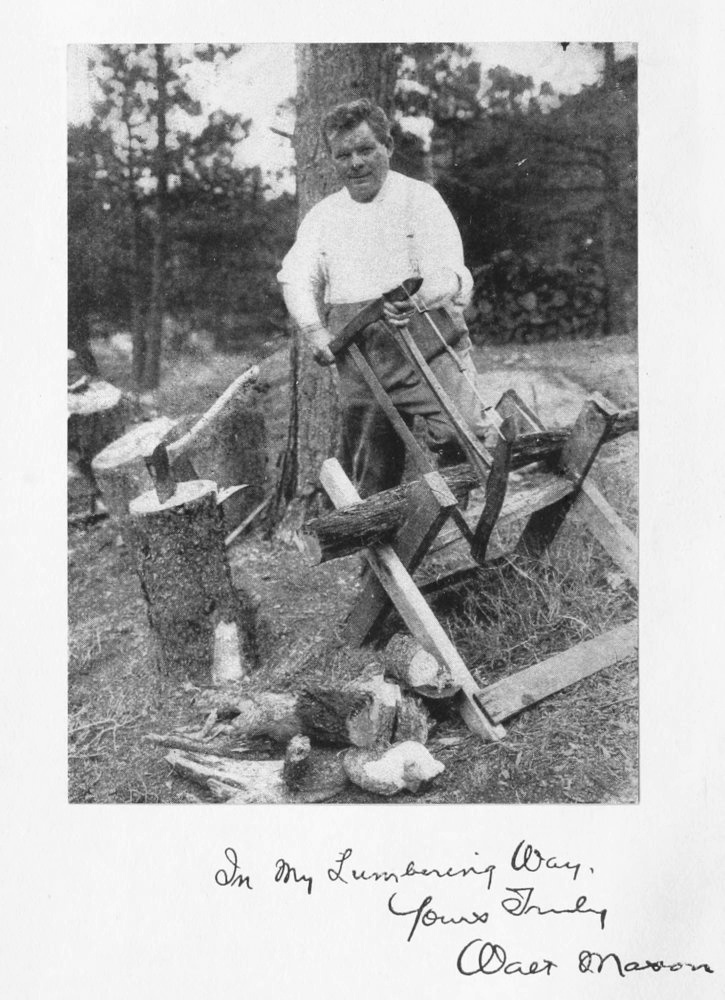

Four more Walt Mason collections were published near annually: "Horse Sense" in Verses Tense (1915), Walt Mason - His Book (1916), Terse Verse (1917), and Lumber Lyrics (1919). Mason would continue writing his daily column for another twenty years, but no more collections were published in book form. By now Mason could afford to take his family to Estes Park, Colorado for summer vacations in his new touring car, though in deference to his age and partial deafness he hired a local lad to do the driving.

== Film shorts ==
Mason wrote six prose poems during 1917 to serve as the storyline for one-reel film shorts. The films were created by the Film-Craft Corporation of New York using Mason's poems as the basis for the scenario. The first was The Dipper, which Mason showed to a select party at the Theater Royal in Emporia on January 25, 1917. A few other films were scheduled to be released during August 1917.

== Later life ==
Mason retired from the Emporia Gazette in April 1920, moving his family from Kansas to La Jolla, California. They lived for a short time in Escondido, California, while a house was built for them in La Jolla. Their new home had a back office where Walt continued to type out his daily column. For exercise he would walk to a bookstore in La Jolla every morning. His wife acted as a gatekeeper, shielding him from dubious callers hoping for a financial handout. He was meticulous in writing his daily column up until January 1939, when at age 76 he was injured in a fall.

From April 30, 1939, on he was bedridden with illness, which by June 1, 1939, was publicly revealed as kidney disease. He fell into a coma during late June, dying of uremic poisoning on June 22, 1939.

== Personal life ==
Walt Mason and K. Ella Foss were married February 15, 1893 at the home of her father Adam Foss in Wooster, Ohio. Their Ohio marriage license, dated February 14, 1893, has him as Walter S. Mason, the only known reference to his middle name.

Their only natural child, Adam Foss Mason, was born on February 18, 1894, in Beatrice, Nebraska. He contracted diphtheria at age six, and died November 19, 1900. Sometime around late 1912 or early 1913 the Masons adopted a six-year-old girl named Mary Ellen, who had been born in Minnesota. She remained living with her new parents through Ella Mason's death in 1936, and Walt Mason's death on June 22, 1939, in La Jolla, California.

== Works ==
Aside from his daily newspaper columns, Mason is known to have written the following longer works:

- Rough Times (1885) Humorous story of a young man in a boarding house, serialized in the Leavenworth Times.
- The Prodigal Daughter (188?) Action story serialized in the Omaha Democrat, of which only the first three chapters were published.
- The Man Who Sobered Up (1893) A semi-autobiographical 260 page novel about overcoming alcoholism. Published by John E. Potter & Co. at Philadelphia, July 1893.
- Old Times and New in Frankfort (1907) Memoir and history of the small Kansas town. Published originally in special editions of the Frankfort Daily Index.

Mason's prose poems for newspaper and magazines have been collected and published in the following volumes:

- Uncle Walt (1910) Contains some 160 prose poems, collected from his newspaper columns. With a foreword by William Allen White and dedicated to Mason's older brother James C. Mason. Published by George Matthew Adams at Chicago, November 1910.
- Walt Mason's Business Prose Poems (1911) 190 pages of prose poems, largely devoted to grocers and dry goods businesses. Introduction by George Ade. Published by George Matthew Adams at Chicago, 1911.
- Uncle Walt's Philosophy (1912) A loose-bound booklet of 12 prose poems from his newspaper columns, published by W. A. Wilde Company, Boston and Chicago.
- Rippling Rhymes (1913) Contains some 80 prose poems, some original, some collected from magazines and his newspaper column. With a foreword by William Jennings Bryan and dedicated to George Matthew Adams. Published by A. C. McClurg & Company at Chicago, October 1913.
- "Horse Sense" in Verses Tense (1915) Contains over 130 prose poems, mainly from magazines. With a brief foreword by John Masefield and dedicated to Arthur Conan Doyle. Published by A. C. McClurg & Company at Chicago, September 1915.
- Walt Mason - His Book (1916) Contains over 160 prose poems from his newspaper columns, including some previously published in book form. With an introduction by Irvin S. Cobb and dedicated to Mason's wife Ella Foss Mason. Published by Barse & Hopkins Company at New York, 1916.
- Terse Verse (1917) Contains 176 prose poems, mainly from his daily syndicated column. With a foreword by William Marion Reedy. Published by A. C. McClurg & Company at Chicago, November 1917.
- Lumber Lyrics (1919) Loose-bound booklet, contains 25 prose poems written especially for Curtis Service, a trade publication of the lumber industry. Published by Stewart-Simmons Press, Waterloo, Iowa. With a brief anonymous profile of Mason, and a foreword by Mason.
