= Alec the Great =

American comic strip by Edwina Dumm

- Edwina Dumm's dog Sinbad was the model for her cartoon dog characters Tippie, Sinbad and Alec.
- Author(s): Edwina Dumm
- Current status/schedule: Gag panel; Concluded
- Launch date: 1931; 94 years ago
- End date: 1969; 56 years ago
- Syndicate(s): George Matthew Adams Service (1918–1965); The Washington Star Syndicate (1965–1969)
- Genre(s): Humor

Alec the Great was a syndicated newspaper gag panel created by Edwina Dumm and featuring a dog character (as did her other comic strip, Cap Stubbs and Tippie). It ran from 1931 to 1969.

== Characters and story ==
In Alec the Great, Dumm illustrated verses written by her brother, Robert Dennis Dumm, about the small dog, Alec. Their collaboration was published as a book, Alec the Great: 1,001 Verses - Wise, Witty and Cheerful (Crown, 1946). Comics historian Maurice Horn notes that Alec looked exactly like Tippie.

Another dog book by Edwina Dumm was Sinbad: A Dog's Life, published by Coward McCann in 1930. Alec and Tippie both looked like Sinbad, who was based on Dumm's real-life dog Sinbad.

== Sources ==
- "Don Markstein's Toonopedia". Donald D. Markstein. Archived from the original on 2024-05-25.
