= Mary McGrory =

American journalist and columnist (1918–2004)

- Born: August 22, 1918; Boston, Massachusetts, U.S.
- Died: April 20, 2004 (aged 85); Washington, D.C., U.S.
- Education: Girls' Latin School; Emmanuel College
- Occupation: Journalist • columnist
- Years active: 1947−2003
- Relatives: Brian McGrory (Cousin)
- Awards: Pulitzer Prize for Commentary, Four Freedoms Award

Mary McGrory (August 22, 1918 – April 20, 2004) was an American journalist and columnist. She specialized in American politics, and was noted for her detailed coverage of political maneuverings. She wrote over 8,000 columns, but no books, and made very few media or lecture appearances.

McGrory was a fierce opponent of the Vietnam War and was placed on Richard Nixon's enemies list. Carlos Lozada wrote in The Washington Post that,

McGrory is what you get when proximity to power, keen observation skills, painstaking reporting, a judgmental streak and passionate liberalism coalesce in a singularly talented writer — one whose abilities are matched by the times.

== Early life and education ==
She was born in the Roslindale neighborhood of Boston to Edward and Mary McGrory, a tight-knit Irish Catholic family. Her father was a postal clerk and she shared his love of Latin and writing. She graduated from the Girls' Latin School and Emmanuel College, both in Boston.

== Career ==
McGrory began her career as a book reviewer at The Boston Herald.

In 1947, she was hired by The Washington Star, where she began her career as a journalist, a path she was inspired to take after reading Jane Arden comic strips. She rose to prominence covering the McCarthy hearings in 1954, during which she portrayed McCarthy as a typical neighborhood Irish bully. In 1975, McGrory won the Pulitzer Prize for Commentary for her articles about the Watergate scandal.

McGrory wrote extensively about the Kennedy presidency. She and John F. Kennedy were close in age, both of Irish descent, and both from Boston. McGrory's exchange with Daniel Patrick Moynihan after the president's assassination was quoted widely: "We will never laugh again," said McGrory. Moynihan, who worked for President Kennedy responded, "Mary, we will laugh again. But we will never be young again."

McGrory was assigned by the Star to travel with Robert F. Kennedy during his ill-fated 1968 presidential campaign and became close to his wife Ethel at the time.

In 1981, the day after The Washington Star ceased publishing, McGrory began her career at The Washington Post.

In 1985, McGrory received the Elijah Parish Lovejoy Award as well as an honorary Doctor of Laws degree from Colby College. In 1998, she won the Fourth Estate Award, from the National Press Club.

== Awards and honors ==
- 1975: Pulitzer Prize for Commentary
- 1995: Four Freedoms Award

== Works ==
- Mary McGrory; Phil Gailey (1 October 2006). The Best of Mary McGrory: A Half-Century of Washington Commentary. Andrews McMeel Publishing. ISBN 978-0-7407-6071-6.

== Death and funeral ==
McGrory died in Washington, D.C. on April 20, 2004, at 85. After her death, she was interred at a tree-shaded cemetery on the edge of town.
