= Lank Leonard =

American comic strip artist of "Mickey Finn"

- Born: Frank E. Leonard; January 2, 1896 Port Chester, New York, U.S.
- Died: August 2, 1970 (aged 74)
- Area: Artist
- Notable works: Mickey Finn

Frank E. Leonard (January 2, 1896 – August 1, 1970), better known as Lank Leonard, was an American cartoonist artist who created the long-running comic strip Mickey Finn, which he drew for more than three decades.

== Biography ==
=== Early life and career ===
Born in Port Chester, New York in 1896, Leonard decided early in his childhood that he wanted to be a cartoonist while he made copies of Buster Brown, Happy Hooligan, Little Nemo and The Katzenjammer Kids, eventually creating his own characters. In high school, he was the art editor of his school newspaper.

After his high school graduation, Leonard took a job as a bookkeeper at a local factory, where he also drew cartoons for the plant's house organ. He studied at a business college from 1914 to 1915, then served in the U.S. Army during World War I.

Returning from the service, Leonard designed a new type of suction sole basketball shoe for a sporting goods firm, which eventually hired him as a salesman. He was in his early twenties, working as a traveling salesman, when he met cartoonist Clare A. Briggs on a train between Sioux City and Omaha and showed him the sketch pad he always carried. "Pretty crude, but there's no doubt you have talent," said Briggs.

Briggs referred him to Chicago Tribune editorial cartoonist Carey Orr, who suggested Leonard take the C. L. Evans correspondence course in cartooning. Leonard did so, mailing in assignments drawn in hotel rooms as he traveled about the country. Later, he took night courses at the School of the Art Institute of Chicago, and New York's Art Students League.

In the spring of 1925, Leonard left his salesman job and started working full-time as a cartoonist. As an inker at the Bray Productions animation studio, he took home a salary of $11 a week. He then drew sports cartoons for a baseball magazine, then spent nine years doing a sports cartoon feature for the George Matthew Adams Syndicate and writing about sports, while also selling sports cartoons to The New York Telegram and The New York Sun. Weighing in at 200 pounds (91 kg) and towering over 6 feet (1.8 m), the lanky Leonard also played semi-pro basketball.

=== Mickey Finn ===
In 1936, the McNaught Syndicate bought his comic strip Mickey Finn about the family life of an Irish-American policeman. From the start, the strip was calculated to show the good qualities of human nature rather than the sordid side of crime. Appearing in more than 300 newspapers at the height of its success, the strip continued under Leonard for the next three decades, assisted by Mart Bailey and Morris Weiss with lettering by Tony DiPreta. Leonard also did a topper strip, Nippie: He's Often Wrong!, which ran beneath the Sunday Mickey Finn. Nippie was a child who ignored warnings in order to do things his way and suffered the consequences.

The character of Mickey Finn was inspired by Leonard's observations of Port Chester policeman Mickey Brennan. Other characters in Mickey Finn were drawn from Lank Leonard's own family, and the model for Mickey Finn was Leonard himself. Mickey's mother was based on numerous sketches of Leonard's mother, and his real-life Uncle Phil inspired the comic strip Uncle Phil. Kitty Kelly, Mickey's fiancée, was modeled on Florence McLaughlin, whom Leonard married in June 1939.

After World War II, Leonard began working in Miami, Florida, during the winter months, and in 1950, he bought a split-level home in Miami Shores, spending ten months of the year there, drawing and playing golf.

On Saturday, March 10, 1951, at his new Miami Shores home, he hosted a gathering of cartoonists. Attending the party were Colin Allen, Frank Beck, Wally Bishop (Muggs and Skeeter), Dick Briefer, Al Fagaly, Quin Hall, Bill Holman, Fred Lasswell, Al Posen, Zack Mosley, Leonard Sansone, Chuck Thorndyke, Burt Whitman and Elmer Woggon.

In 1951, Leonard and Bishop left Florida for Washington's Carlton Hotel, where they joined other members of the National Cartoonists Society for breakfast on November 6 with Harry Truman. Gathered in Washington to help the Treasury Department sell Defense Stamps, the group presented Truman with a bound volume of their comic strip characters, some interacting with caricatures of Truman.

In the early 1960s, Leonard let Weiss take over the writing of the strip. Leonard died in 1970, two years after retiring. Lank and Florence Leonard had two children, Jim and Nancy. Jim was born in 1956. Daughter Nancy attended Salve Regina College in Newport, Rhode Island.
