= George Matthew Adams =

American newspaper columnist

- Born: August 23, 1878; Saline, Michigan, U.S.
- Died: October 29, 1962 (aged 84)
- Education: Ottawa University
- Occupations: Writer, businessman
- Known for: George Matthew Adams Newspaper Service

George Matthew Adams (August 23, 1878 – October 29, 1962) was an American newspaper columnist and founder of the George Matthew Adams Newspaper Service, which syndicated comic strips and columns to newspapers for five decades. His own writings were circulated widely to The Gettysburg Times and many other newspapers.

== Biography ==
=== Early life and education ===
Born in Saline, Michigan, George Matthew Adams graduated from Ottawa University in Kansas. Employed by a Chicago advertising agency, he started operating the elevator and worked his way up to become a copywriter.

=== George Matthew Adams Newspaper Service ===
George Matthew Adams Service
- Formerly: Adams Newspaper Service; Adams Syndication Service
- Industry: Print syndication
- Founded: 1907; 119 years ago
- Founder: George Matthew Adams
- Defunct: May 1965; 61 years ago
- Fate: remaining features sold to The Washington Star, becoming The Washington Star Syndicate
- Headquarters: 8 West 40th Street, Manhattan, New York City, N.Y., US
- Key people: Giordano Bruno Pascale; Harry E. Elmlark
- Products: Comic strips, newspaper columns, editorial cartoons
- Owner: George Matthew Adams

In 1907, Adams borrowed money to rent and equip an office and launched the Adams Newspaper Service. Adams' syndicate was located at 8 West 40th Street in Manhattan. When Adams and Emporia Gazette publisher William Allen White met in Chicago in 1908, Adams hired White to write about political issues. Adams had copies of Walt Mason's light verse which he had clipped from the Gazette, and said, "I like this stuff. I'd like to syndicate it to other papers. Suppose I could?" White responded, "Sure. Give Uncle Walt about $18 a week, and he'll be tickled pink to do it for you." Adams did, and as Mason's Rippling Rhythms column increased in popularity, he eventually increased Mason's salary to $15,000 a year.

The name of the Adams Newspaper Service was changed in 1916 to the George Matthew Adams Service. Writers syndicated by Adams included Thornton Burgess, Edgar Guest and Robert Ripley. The syndicate also distributed single-panel cartoons, including some accompanied by jokes, backwoods homilies, light verse or Adams-style inspiration. Adams syndicated comic strips, including Billy DeBeck's Finn an' Haddie, Percy Crosby's The Clancy Kids, Edwina Dumm's Cap Stubbs and Tippie, Ed Wheelan's Minute Movies, and Robert Baldwin's Freddy. In addition to sports cartoons by Lank Leonard, Adams syndicated Johnny Gruelle's illustrated Raggedy Ann panels from 1934 to 1938. The uplifting Raggedy Ann verses emphasized forthrightness, honesty, kindness and thrift. He also syndicated Rebecca McCann's philosophical The Cheerful Cherub.

Lloyd Jacquet was the syndicate's art director from c. 1936 to 1937, shortly before leaving to found Funnies, Inc. The syndicate's long-time manager was Giordano Bruno Pascale.

Adams's syndicate peaked in the 1920s and 1930s, eventually fading as its founder aged. In the company's latter years, the president and general manager was Harry E. Elmlark.

Adams died in 1962; the remaining features were sold to The Washington Star Company in May 1965, thus forming the Washington Star Syndicate.

=== Writing ===
In the 1910s, Adams was selling Dr. Frank Crane's (1861–1928) popular Four Minute Essays. When he lost Crane to a competitor, he decided to write short inspirational essays himself while he traveled from city to city selling to newspapers. By the 1950s, Crane was all but forgotten, but Adams' short inspirational columns, titled Today's Talk, were in about 100 newspapers and also collected in a series of books.

==== Books ====
- You Can: A Collection of Brief Talks on the Most Important Topic in the World — Your Success (Frederick A. Stokes Company, 1913)
- Take It: Suggestions as to Your Right to the World and the Great Things That are in It (Frederick A. Stokes, 1917)
- Up: A Little Book of Talks on how to Wake Up, Get Up, Think Up, Climb Up, Smile Up, Cheer Up, Work Up, Look Up, Help Up, Grow Up! (Reilly and Lee Company, 1920)
- Just Among Friends (William Morrow and Company, 1928)
- Better Than Gold (Duell, Sloan and Pearce, 1949)
- The Great Little Things (Duel, Sloan and Pearce, 1953)

== Adams Service strips and panels ==
Launched in the 1910s:

- Cap Stubbs and Tippie by Edwina Dumm (1918–1965; continued by The Washington Star Syndicate)
- The Cheerful Cherub by Rebecca McCann (c. 1916–1927)
- The Clancy Kids by Percy Crosby (1916–c. 1919)
- Finn an' Haddie by Billy DeBeck (1916)
- Miss Information by Wood Cowan (1919–1922; moved to the Ledger Syndicate)
- Not Now by Richard W. Dorgan (c. 1916–1917)
- The Young Lady Across the Way by Robert O. Ryder and Harry J. Westerman (1913–1919; moved to McClure Newspaper Syndicate)
- Zimmie by Arch Bristow (1912–1913)

Launched in the 1920s:

- Billy's Uncle by Ben Batsford (October 9, 1922 – August 2, 1924)
- In Our Office by Wood Cowan (early 1920s)
- Lank Leonard sports cartoons (c. 1927–c. 1936)
- Minute Movies by Ed Wheelan (1921–1935)
- Pecos Bill by Tex O'Reilly and Jack Warren (1936–1937)
- Reg'lar Fellers ostensibly by Gene Byrnes; ghosted by Tack Knight (1924–1929; came over from the Bell Syndicate; moved to King Features Syndicate)

Launched in the 1930s:

- Alec the Great by Edwina Dumm (1931–1965; continued by The Washington Star Syndicate)
- Cap'n Cloud by Robert Weinstein (1935)
- Decks Awash by Augustus J. Robinson (November 16, 1935 – April 4, 1936)
- Doctor Remedy by Adolph Schus (1939)
- The Enchanted Stone by Adolphe Barreaux (1935)
- Hector Hicks by Lank Leonard (1933)
- Loco Luke by Jack Warren (July 5, 1935 – April 4, 1936)
- Raggedy Ann by Johnny Gruelle (1934–1938)
- Ted Strong by Al Carreno (1935–1939)

Launched in the 1940s:

- Miki by Tom Morrison (c. 1945-c. 1950)

Launched in the 1950s:

- Barkis and Family by Crockett Johnson (1955)
- Freddy by Robert Baldwin (1955–1966; continued by Publishers-Hall Syndicate)
- Mr. Holiday by Chad Kelly and Fran Matera (1950–1951)
- Sky Masters of the Space Force (1958–1961) by Jack Kirby (1958–1961), Marvin Stein (1958), David Wood, Dick Wood, & Wally Wood (1958–1960)
- Uncle Charlie by Peter Laing (c. 1955–1965; continued by The Washington Star Syndicate 1965–1978)

Launched in the 1960s:

- The Birds by Joe Appalucci (1963)
- Buenos Dias by Ed Nofziger (1963–1965; continued by The Washington Star Syndicate 1965–1967)
- Cuppy the Newsboy by Joe Appalucci (October 8, 1962 – March 7, 1964)

== Adams Service columnists ==
- George Matthew Adams's Today's Talk (c. 1913–c. 1955)
- Thornton Burgess's Bedtime Stories (1912–1960)
- Dr. Frank Crane's Four Minute Essays (c. 1913)
- Edgar Guest (c. 1917–?)
- Walt Mason ("Uncle Walt")'s Rippling Rhythms (1908–?)
- Robert Ripley
- William Allen White
