= Tony DiPreta =

American cartoonist

- Born: Anthony Louis DiPreta; July 9, 1921 Stamford, Connecticut, US
- Died: June 2, 2010 (aged 88) Greenwich, Connecticut, US
- Areas: Cartoonist, Penciller, Inker
- Notable works: Joe Palooka; Rex Morgan, M.D.

Anthony Louis DiPreta (July 9, 1921 – June 2, 2010) was an American comic book and comic strip artist active from the 1940s Golden Age of comic books. He was the longtime successor artist of the comic strip Joe Palooka (1959–84) and drew the Rex Morgan, M.D. daily strip from 1983 until DiPreta's retirement in 2000.

== Early life and career ==
Born July 9, 1921, in Stamford, Connecticut, to a family that included brothers Joe and Leonard, Tony DiPreta grew up during the Great Depression, during which his father had little or no work and his mother sewed in a sweat shop for $7 a week. He decided while in junior high school that he would pursue an art career after reading in the local newspaper that cartoonist H. T. Webster made $50,000 a year. "I thought, 'Boy, that's a lot.' I went down and saw him, and he talked to me. Then I started drawing for my junior high school. It made me feel like I could really draw." DiPreta took art classes when he attended Stamford High School. After graduating, DiPreta and fellow future professionals Red Wexler and Bob Fujitani took classes at the Silvermine Guild, where the trio drew from live models.

DiPreta had worked for a local advertising agency while attending high school, and after a year doing that, he obtained a union job at McCalls Photo Engraving, also in Stamford. During his subsequent year at McCalls, DiPreta began coloring comic books for company client Quality Comics, located a half-mile away. Separately, DiPreta freelanced as a fill-in letterer for Lyman Young's newspaper comic strip Tim Tyler's Luck. DiPreta recalled, "My brother Joe used to caddy [at the old Greenwich golf course].... Lyman Young, who did Tim Tyler's Luck, used to play there, and my brother was once lucky enough to caddy for Lyman Young. He told Lyman Young that I wanted to be a cartoonist, and Young said, 'Well, bring him down.' ... I went to see him and he said, 'Why don't you letter my strip?' But this wasn't a permanent job. He'd call me on a Saturday afternoon — when he wanted to play golf — and I'd come over and letter his strips."

After seeing the portfolio samples that DiPreta brought to him during a lunch hour in 1940, Quality publisher Everett M. "Busy" Arnold hired DiPreta as a staff letterer for $25 per week, a wage equal to that of his now-working father's well-paying job as a defense industry worker. Under editor Ed Cronin and Cronin's assistant Gill Fox, DiPreta was sent to Quality artist Lou Fine's Tudor City studio in Manhattan to observe and learn from Fine's highly regarded draftsmanship. Shortly afterward, Arnold was concerned over what he saw as Fine's undynamic storytelling, and had Fujitani and DiPreta do pencil-breakdowns for a story each that Fine would finish penciling and inking; DiPreta's starred the character Uncle Sam. At some point, he studied at Columbia University and the University of Connecticut.

DiPreta's first generally accepted solo art credit in comics is a one-page humor filler in publisher Quality's National Comics #8 (Feb. 1941). His first confirmable credit is a similar filler in the company's Doll Man #2 (Spring 1942).

== Golden Age of Comics ==
In 1941, DiPreta visited New York City's Timely Comics, the 1940s predecessor of Marvel Comics. Going on a Saturday, DiPreta recalled, he nonetheless met editor-in-chief Stan Lee, who had DiPreta ink a story for the humor feature "Ziggy Pig and Silly Seal". DiPreta recalled, "I was paid either seven bucks or eight bucks a page. The story was seven or eight pages long. However, it all worked out, I was going to get $57 for this job", which he delivered to Lee the following Saturday. "I thought, 'Hey, 25 bucks a week from Arnold is pretty good, but 57 bucks a week is better'. I decided to go freelance", and did so beginning April 1, 1941.

Following that initial Timely story, DiPreta drew only sporadically for the company during the 1940s due to steady work from former Quality editor Cronin, who by then was at Hillman Periodicals. DiPreta drew such Hillman humor features as "Buttons the Rabbit", "Captain Codfish", "Earl the Rich Rabbit", "Fatsy McPig", "One Wing Spin", "Skinny McGinty" (in Air Fighters Comics) and "Stupid Manny" (in Clue Comics). DiPreta concurrently drew Quality humor features, including "Blimpy" (in Feature Comics), "Windy Breeze", and "Mayor Midge" for Quality.

DiPreta did his first dramatic work, a war story, for editor Vin Sullivan's Columbia Comics. He also drew the lead feature, "Airboy", in at Air Fighters Comics #7-9 (April–June 1943). Also, DiPreta occasionally drew the superheroes "Boy King" and "Zippo" — no relation to the popular brand of cigarette lighter — for Hillman's Clue Comics and "Magno" for Ace Magazines' Super-Mystery Comics, as well as a small amount of comics work for Et-Es-Go Magazines, Lev Gleason Publications, and editor Leonard B. Cole at Holyoke Publishing. DiPreta also drew public service announcement one-pagers with Airboy and Iron Ace.

Afflicted by a heart murmur since age 13, DiPreta was rejected for World War II military service as 4F. As the war progressed, DiPreta read a newspaper article saying anyone not doing war-related work would be drafted no matter their physical condition, and at least work stateside. DiPreta recalled he was re-designated 4C, although 4C is the designation for an alien or dual national. In any event, DiPreta was never called into service.

== Post-war career ==
=== Comic books ===
During the 1950s, DiPreta drew comic books primarily for Lev Gleason's "Little Wise Guys" kid-gang feature in that company's Daredevil (no relation to Marvel Comics'), and for anthological horror titles from Atlas Comics, Marvel's 1950s iteration. His Atlas work, the first known credit of which is also included a Western story in Texas Kid #5 (Sept. 1951), includes work in Journey into Mystery #1 (June 1952), and issues of Adventures into Terror, Adventures Into Weird Worlds, Astonishing, Marvel Tales, Menace, Mystery Tales, Strange Tales, Strange Tales of the Unusual, Uncanny Tales, and World of Fantasy. He also drew occasional stories for such Atlas crime fiction titles as Tales of Justice, war comics such as Battlefront, and, returning to humor, the sole two issues of the Casper the Friendly Ghost-like Adventures of Homer Ghost.

DiPreta gained some recognition in comics during the 1970s, long after he'd left the field to concentrate on comic strips, when some of his Atlas work was reprinted in the Marvel comics Beware, Chamber of Chills, Creatures on the Loose, Vault of Evil, Weird Wonder Tales, Where Monsters Dwell, and even in an issue each of the superhero series Marvel Feature and the supernatural-hero series Giant-Size Werewolf. DiPreta's 1950s horror work was also considered mature enough to appear in Marvel's black-and-white, non-Comics Code horror-comics magazines Dracula Lives, Monsters Unleashed, Tales of the Zombie, and Vampire Tales. Most reprints were faithful, though DiPreta's "Escape From Nowhere", from World of Suspense #7 (April 1957), was reprinted in Amazing Adventures #28 (Jan. 1975) minus one of its original three pages.

=== Comic strips ===
In 1945, DiPreta broke into the field of syndicated newspaper comic strip art as an assistant to cartoonist Frank E. "Lank" Leonard's popular strip about a suburban beat cop, Mickey Finn. DiPreta continued in that position, while concurrently drawing freelance for comic books, through 1955.

In 1959, DiPreta succeeded creator Ham Fisher and first successor artist Moe Leff on the long-running boxing strip Joe Palooka. He continued on that strip, written by Jim Lawrence, Bob Gustafson, Ken Fitch, Morris Weiss, and Ed Moore, through its end in 1984. In 1983, he became the latest successor, following artists Marvin Bradley, Frank Springer, and Fernando Da Silva, of Rex Morgan, M.D., working with writer-creator Nicholas P. Dallis, also known as Dal Curtis, and Dallis' assistant, writer Woody Wilson. The strip continued after DiPreta's 2000 retirement. Fellow Stamford cartoonist Mort Walker said in 2010 that DiPreta did an unspecified amount of work at some point on Walker's strip Beetle Bailey.

== Later career ==
DiPreta's last known comics credit is A.C.E. Comics' Fantastic Adventures #3 (Oct. 1987), for which he penciled and inked the cover, the four-page humor story "The Score Board Kid" (by writer Jerry DeFuccio), and "The Motor-Man On Wheels!", a six-page DeFuccio profile of DiPreta and the artist's Golden Age character Zippo.

== Personal life ==
In November 1960, DiPreta married Frances, who died September 26, 2009. The couple had two sons, Richard and Edward, and a daughter, Janet.

DiPreta died of respiratory and cardiac arrest in Greenwich, Connecticut, on June 2, 2010, aged 88.
