= Mickey Finn (comic strip) =

American comic strip by Lank Leonard

- Lank Leonard's Mickey Finn (December 5, 1937)
- Author: Lank Leonard (1936–1968); Morris Weiss (1968–1977)
- Current status/schedule: Concluded daily & Sunday strip
- Launch date: April 6, 1936
- End date: September 10, 1977
- Syndicate: McNaught Syndicate
- Publisher(s): Eastern Color Printing; Quality Comics; Columbia Comics
- Genre: Comedy drama

Mickey Finn was an American comic strip created by cartoonist Lank Leonard, which was syndicated to newspapers from April 6, 1936 to September 10, 1977. The successful lighthearted strip struck a balance between comedy and drama. It was adapted to a 400-page Little Big Book and was reprinted in several comic book series throughout the 1930s and 1940s.

== Publication history ==
Distributed by the McNaught Syndicate, cartoonist Lank Leonard's Mickey Finn debuted as a daily strip on Monday, April 6, 1936. The Sunday strip, which eventually focused on the supporting character of Uncle Phil, began on May 17 of that same year.

Leonard was assisted by Tony DiPreta (from 1945–50) and by Mart Bailey from 1950 in New York. In 1952, Bailey moved to Miami to help Leonard with the strip until July 1959.

Morris Weiss, Leonard's assistant from 1936 to 1943 and again from 1960 on, took over following Leonard's illness in 1968, though under Leonard's byline. Weiss' first credited strip was November 30, 1970. Weiss continued through the final Sunday strip on December 21, 1975 and the daily strip's finale on July 31, 1976. Other 1940s assistants were Ray McGill, John Vita, Allie Vita and Larry Tullapano. Early in his career, DiPreta did the strip's lettering.

The Sunday page included a topper strip called Nippie -- He's Often Wrong, which ran from May 17, 1936 to July 28, 1946. This strip featured a foolhardy young man who often ignored other people's advice. Comics historian Allan Holtz wrote, "This topper strip should win some sort of award as the most repetitive and unentertaining topper ever to be associated with a mainstream Sunday strip." For several years, the Mickey Finn topper also included a one-panel factoid under several titles: Know Your Navy (Nov 1943 - Aug 26, 1945), Know Your Merchant Marine (Sept 9 - Dec 9, 1945) and Know Your Sports (Dec 16, 1945 - April 21, 1946).

== Characters and story ==
The storyline centered on likable Irish-American police officer Michael Aloysius "Mickey" Finn in suburban Port Chester, New York. Leonard based the character on Port Chester policeman Mickey Brennan after watching Brennan helping children cross the street.

Like other police strips, it surfaced in the wake of the blockbuster Dick Tracy, but Mickey Finn was more analogous to the popular 1970s television program Barney Miller, focusing on humor and character rather than on action or mystery. Historian Tom Whissen found it "one of the few comic strips ever to portray a city policeman in a manner that avoided either sentimentality or sensationalism."

Uncle Phil in a cartoon created for the program for Bing Crosby's annual golf tournament in 1956

When the strip began, Mickey worked at the Schultz Soap Company, but after he caught a runaway steer, he was given a chance to take a police physical exam. Mickey lived with his widowed mother and her cigar-smoking, derby-wearing, blarney-spieling brother, Uncle Phil, a member of the Goat Hill Lodge of the Ancient Order of American Grenadiers. Uncle Phil became a breakout character. Comics historian Don Markstein noted:

Mickey patrolled a quiet neighborhood beat, where a big crime confrontation might involve foiling a penny-ante burglar. He joined the U.S. Navy during World War II, and eventually rose to the rank of detective—but during most of the strip's run, Mickey sauntered about in a police uniform, just a big, friendly guy, there to help out.

With Mickey promoted to become a detective, Uncle Phil became an alderman and sheriff. Supporting characters included Mickey's girlfriend Kitty Kelly, Sergeant Halligan, baseball player Red Fedder and bartender Clancy. Leonard occasionally brought into the strip real-life sports figures, such as Joe Louis and Lou Gehrig.

== Reprints ==
Mickey Finn (1940), a Little Big Book from Saalfield Publishing.

Lank Leonard's Mickey Finn strip was reprinted in color in the first American comic book series, Eastern Color Printing's Famous Funnies, starting with issue #28 (Nov. 1936). Famous Funnies also reprinted Leonard's Nippie: He's Often Wrong topper strip. Mickey Finn appeared in most issues through #35 (June 1937). The strip then appeared in every issue of Quality Comics' Feature Funnies (retitled Feature Comics with issue #21) from #1-113 (Oct. 1937 - Aug. 1947). Concurrently for a few months, Mickey Finn also ran in Columbia Comic Corporation's Big Shot #74–104 (Feb. 1947 - Aug. 1949). The strip was also reprinted in its own comic book series, Eastern Color's Mickey Finn #1-4 (no cover dates; 1942-1943), which continued as Columbia's Mickey Finn #5-15 (no cover dates; 1944–1949). The strip's final comic-book reprints were Headline Comics' Mickey Finn vol. 3, #1–2) in 1952.

Additionally, an adaptation of the comic strip was published as a Little Big Book, Mickey Finn (1940). Unrelated to Western Publishing's Big Little Books, this was one of a series by the Saalfield Publishing Company of Akron, Ohio. Golden Years Publications reprinted the Mickey Finn strips from Big Shot #82 (Oct. 1947) in All-Amazing Comics #16 (Dec. 2001).

== Reactions to the strip ==
Referring to Peanuts creator Charles Schulz, Morris Weiss said in 2006, "'Sparky' Schulz once told me that Mickey Finn was his dad's favorite comic strip. Compliments like that you don't hear every day."
