= Walt Mason House =

Historic house in Kansas, United States

- U.S. National Register of Historic Places
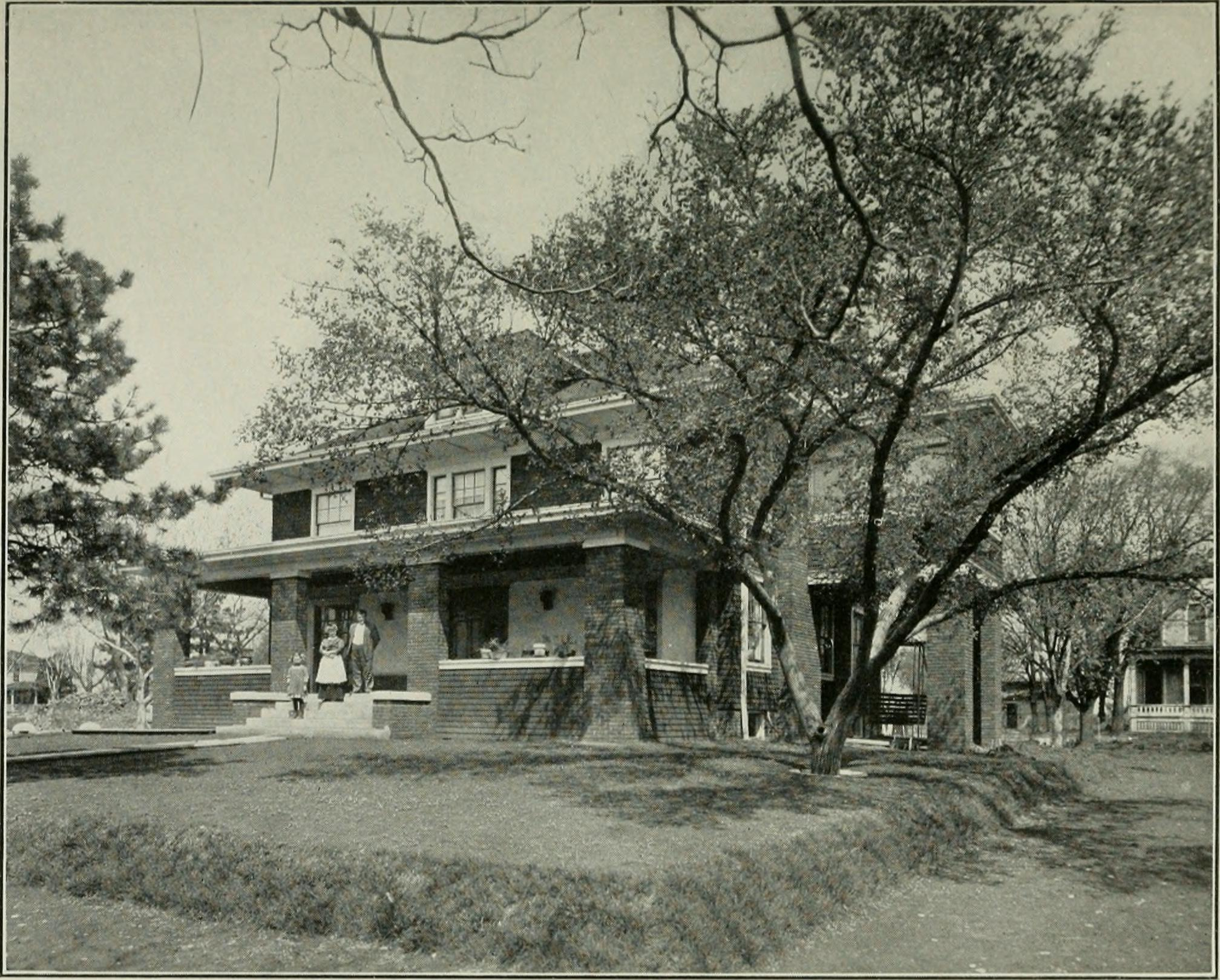

- Location within Kansas Location within the United States
- Location: 606 W. 12th Ave., Emporia, Kansas
- Coordinates: 38°24′45″N 96°11′20″W
- Area: less than one acre
- Built: 1912
- Built by: Tom Cox
- Architect: Henry W. Brinkman
- Architectural style: Late 19th and Early 20th Century American Movements, American Foursquare
- NRHP reference No.: 92000446
- Added to NRHP: April 30, 1992

The Walt Mason House in Emporia, Kansas, located at 606 W. 12th Ave., was built in 1912. It was listed on the National Register of Historic Places in 1992.

It is an American Foursquare-style house. It was home of Walt Mason (1862-1939), a humorist poet. The house was deemed notable for "its historical association with Walt Mason and ...for its architectural significance as an American Foursquare style house."
