= Paul Brickman =

American screenwriter and film director

- Born: April 23, 1949 (age 75); Chicago, Illinois, U.S.
- Occupation: Filmmaker
- Years active: 1977–2012
- Spouse: Jennifer Schweitzer
- Parent(s): Shirley Kronenthal Brickman; Morrie Brickman

Paul Brickman (born April 23, 1949) is an American screenwriter and film director. He is best known for writing and directing Risky Business.

== Early life ==
Brickman was born in Chicago and raised in suburban Highland Park, the son of Shirley (née Kronenthal) and Morrie Brickman. His father was a cartoonist who created the comic strip "The Small Society."

Brickman graduated from Highland Park High School in 1967. He graduated from Claremont Men's College in Claremont, California.

== Career ==
Brickman began his career by writing the screenplays for The Bad News Bears in Breaking Training and Handle with Care, both of which were released in 1977.

In 1983, he made his directorial debut with Risky Business, starring Tom Cruise. Much of the film was filmed in Brickman's hometown, Highland Park, Illinois, and the surrounding area. However, the film was set in nearby Glencoe. The film was a major success, though Brickman felt disillusioned at having to compromise on the ending.

In 1990, he cowrote and directed Men Don't Leave, a loose adaptation of the 1982 French film La Vie Continue.

Brickman shared writing credit with Jon Avnet (the producer of Risky Business) on the 2001 NBC miniseries Uprising.

His only other directing credit is a short film called Allison (2012).

== Filmography ==
Year	Title	Director	Writer	Executive Producer	Notes
1977	The Bad News Bears in Breaking Training	No	Yes	No	
1977	Handle with Care	No	Yes	Yes	
1983	Risky Business	Yes	Yes	No	Directorial debut
1983	Deal of the Century	No	Yes	Yes	
1990	Men Don't Leave	Yes	Yes	No	
1999	True Crime	No	Yes	No	
2001	Uprising	No	Yes	No	TV miniseries
2012	Allison	Yes	Yes	No	Short film
