= The Washington Star =

Washington, D.C. newspaper (1852–1981)

Washington Star
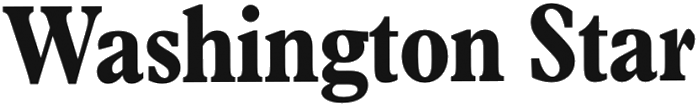
- Type: Daily afternoon newspaper
- Format: Broadsheet
- Owners: William Douglas Wallach (1853–1867); Crosby Stuart Noyes, Samuel H. Kauffmann and George W. Adams (1867–1938); Joe Allbritton (1975–1978); Time, Inc. (1978–1981)
- Founder: Captain Joseph Borrows Tate
- Editor: Jim Bellows (1975–1978)
- Staff writers: Mary McGrory, Clifford K. Berryman
- Founded: December 16, 1852; 173 years ago
- Ceased publication: August 7, 1981; 45 years ago
- Political alignment: Conservative
- Headquarters: 1101 Pennsylvania Avenue, NW, Washington, D.C., U.S.
- City: Washington, D.C.
- Country: United States

The Washington Star, previously known as the Washington Star-News and the Washington Evening Star, was a daily afternoon newspaper published in Washington, D.C., between 1852 and 1981. The Sunday edition was known as the Sunday Star. The paper was renamed several times before becoming Washington Star by the late 1970s.

For most of the time it was publishing, The Washington Star was a newspaper of record for Washington, D.C. It provided a longtime home to columnist Mary McGrory (1918–2004) and to cartoonist Clifford K. Berryman (1869–1949). On August 7, 1981, after 128 years, The Washington Star ceased publication and filed for bankruptcy. In the bankruptcy sale, The Washington Post purchased the land and buildings owned by The Washington Star, including its printing presses.

== History ==
=== 19th century ===
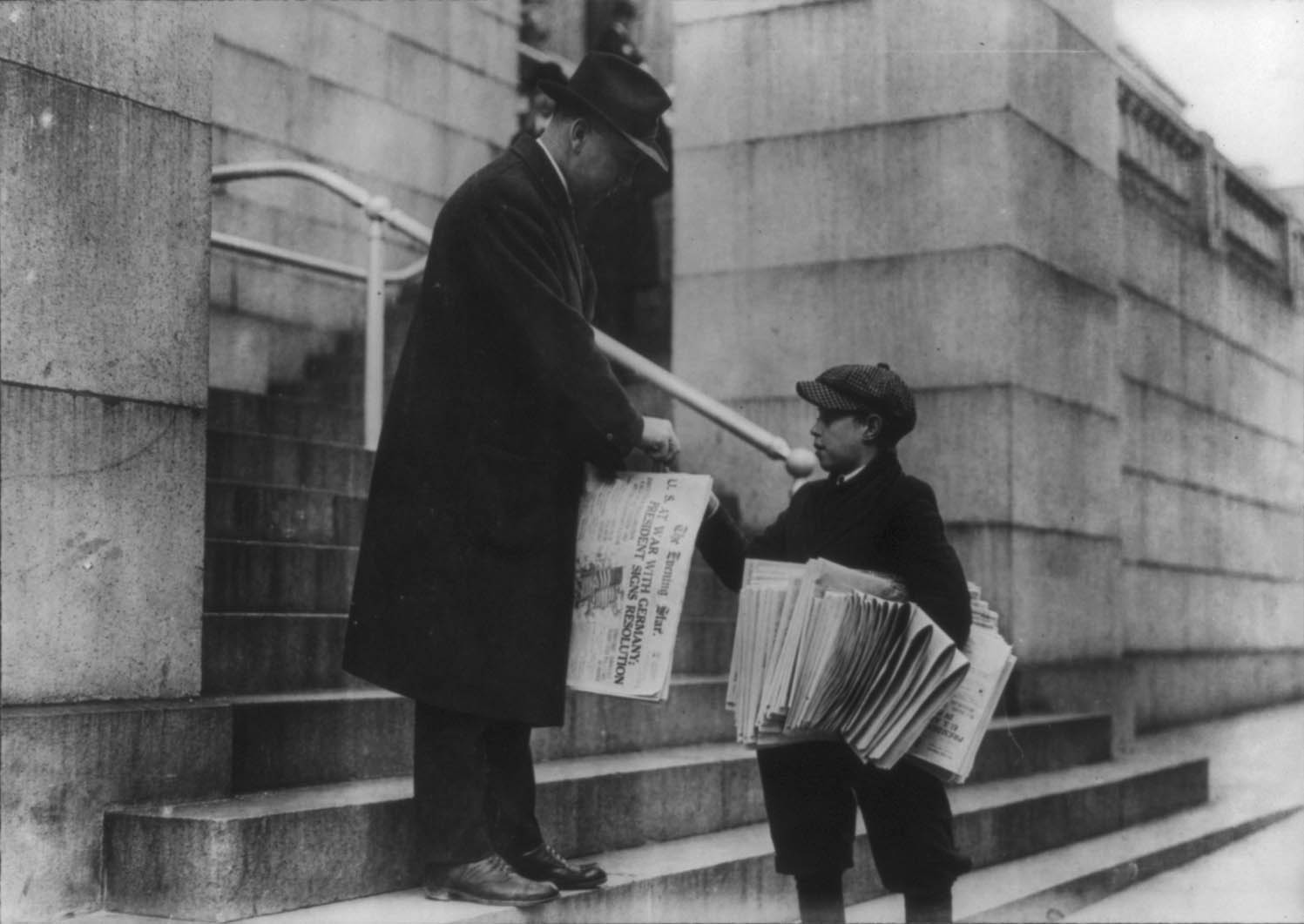
A young boy sells The Evening Star to a man in 1917; the headline, published as the U.S. was entering World War I, reads: "U.S. at War with Germany"

The Washington Star was founded on December 16, 1852, by Captain Joseph Borrows Tate. It was originally headquartered on "Newspaper Row" on Pennsylvania Avenue in Washington, D.C. Tate initially named the paper The Daily Evening Star.

In 1853, Texas surveyor and newspaper entrepreneur William Douglas Wallach purchased the paper, and in 1854 shortened the name to The Evening Star and introduced The Sunday Star edition. The sole owner of the paper for 14 years, Wallach built up its subscriptions with reporting of the American Civil War, among other things. In 1867, a three-man consortium of Crosby Stuart Noyes, Samuel H. Kauffmann and George W. Adams acquired the paper, with each of the investors putting up $33,333.33. The Noyes-Kauffmann-Adams interests would own the paper for the next four generations.

=== 20th century ===
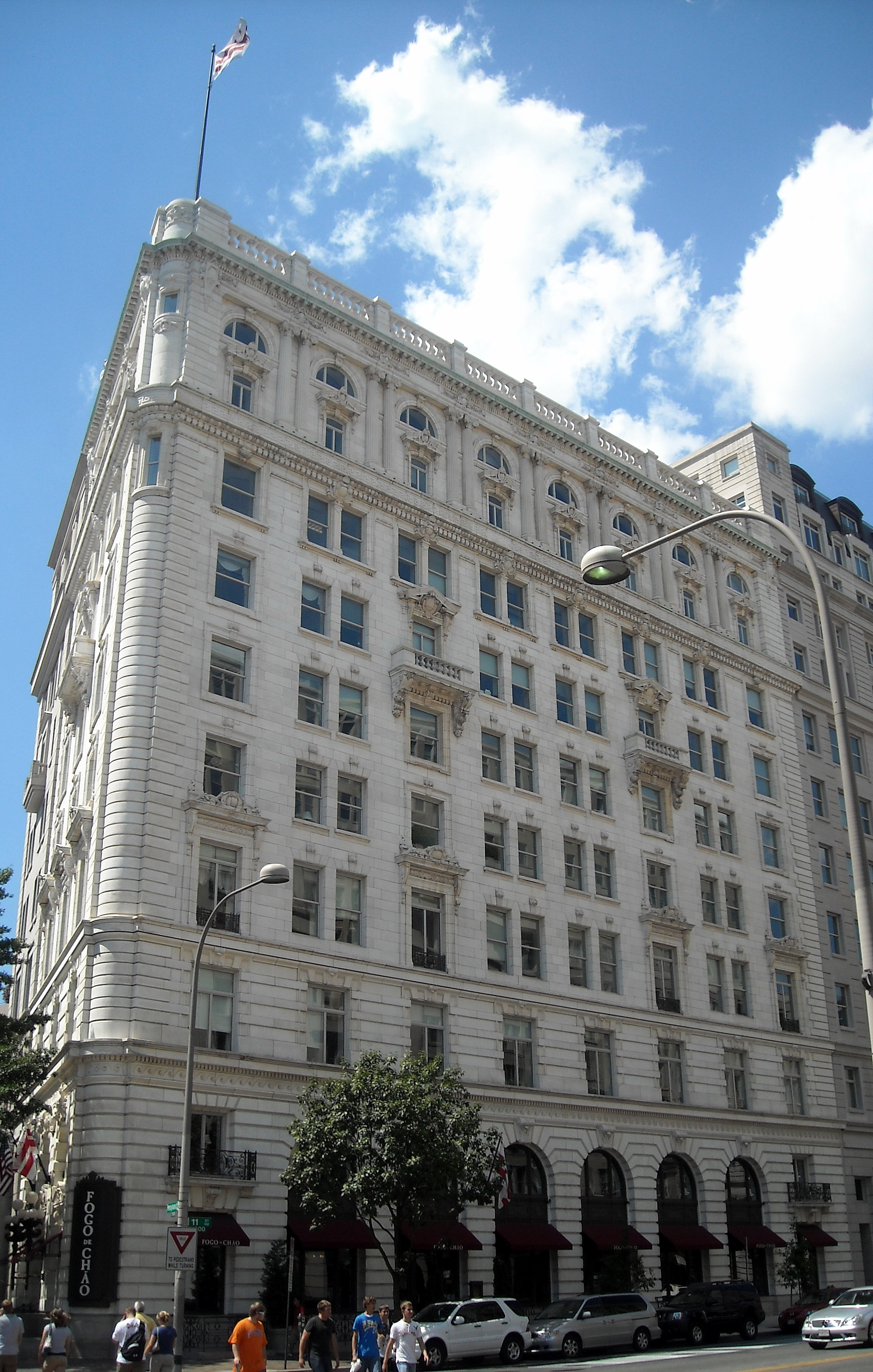
The Evening Star Building at 1101 Pennsylvania Avenue, NW in Washington, D.C., now part of the Pennsylvania Avenue National Historic Site

In 1907, subsequent Pulitzer Prize winning cartoonist Clifford K. Berryman joined the Star. Berryman was most famous for his 1902 cartoon of President Theodore "Teddy" Roosevelt, "Drawing the Line in Mississippi," which spurred the creation of the teddy bear. During his career, Berryman drew thousands of cartoons commenting on American Presidents and politics. Presidential figures included former Presidents Theodore Roosevelt, Franklin D. Roosevelt, and Harry S. Truman. The cartoons satirized both Democrats and Republicans and covered topics such as drought, farm relief, and food prices; representation of the District of Columbia in Congress; labor strikes and legislation; campaigning and elections; political patronage; European coronations; the America's Cup; and the atomic bomb. Berryman's career continued at the Star until he collapsed on the lobby floor one morning in 1949 and died shortly after of a heart ailment.

The next major change to the newspaper came in 1938, when the three owning families diversified their interests. On May 1, the Star purchased the M. A. Leese Radio Corporation and acquired Washington's oldest radio station, WMAL, in the process. Renamed the Evening Star Broadcasting Company, the 1938 acquisition would figure later in the 1981 demise of the newspaper.

The Star's influence and circulation peaked in the 1950s; it constructed a new printing plant in Southeast Washington capable of printing millions of copies, but found itself unable to cope with changing times. Nearly all top editorial and business staff jobs were held by members of the owning families, including a Kauffmann general manager who had gained a reputation for anti-Semitism, driving away advertisers. Suburbanization and competition with television news were other factors for declining circulation and staffing; Carl Bernstein reflected in his 2021 memoir that the Star "couldn't get the paper out to the newer postwar suburbs until late in the afternoon" because "delivery trucks got tied up in rush hour traffic."

Meanwhile, The Washington Post acquired and merged with its morning rival, the Washington Times-Herald, in 1954 and steadily drew readers and advertisers away from the falling Star. By the 1960s, the Post was Washington's leading newspaper.

The Star expanded to broadcasting by purchasing two more stations, WLVA-AM-TV in Lynchburg in 1965; and WCIV in Charleston in 1966.

In 1972, the Star purchased and absorbed one of Washington's few remaining competing newspapers, The Washington Daily News. For a short period of time after the merger, both "The Evening Star" and "The Washington Daily News" mastheads appeared on the front page. The paper soon was retitled "Washington Star News" and finally, "The Washington Star" by the late 1970s.

In 1973, the Star was targeted for clandestine purchase by interests close to the South African Apartheid government in its propaganda war, in what became known as the Muldergate Scandal. The Star, whose editorial policy had always been conservative, was seen as favorable to South Africa at the time. In 1974, pro-apartheid Michigan newspaper publisher John P. McGoff attempted to purchase The Washington Star for $25 million, but he and his family received death threats, and the sale did not go through.

In early 1975, the Noyes-Kauffmann-Adams group sold its interests in the paper to Joe Allbritton, a Texas multimillionaire who was known as a corporate turnaround artist. Allbritton, who also owned Riggs Bank, then the most prestigious bank in the capital, planned to use profits from WMAL-AM-FM-TV to shore up the newspaper's finances. The Federal Communications Commission stymied him with rules on media cross-ownership, however. The FCC had recently banned common ownership of newspapers and broadcast outlets, while grandfathering existing clusters. Due to the manner in which Allbritton's takeover was structured, the FCC considered it to be an ownership change, and stripped the WMAL stations of their grandfathered protection. Allbritton sold off all of the Star Company's radio stations in 1977, and channel 7 was renamed WJLA-TV.

On October 1, 1975, press operators at the Post went on strike, severely damaging all printing presses before leaving the building. Allbritton would not assist Katharine Graham, the owner of the Post, in any way, refusing to print his rival's papers on the Star's presses, since that likely would have caused the Star to be struck by the press operators as well. Allbritton also had major disagreements with editor Jim Bellows over editorial policy; Bellows left the Star for the Los Angeles Herald-Examiner. Unable to make the Star profitable, Allbritton explored other options, including a joint operating agreement with the Post.

On February 2, 1978, Allbritton sold the Star to Time Inc. for $20 million. Their flagship magazine, Time, was the arch-rival to Newsweek, which The Washington Post Company had owned since 1961. Time Inc.'s president, James R. Shepley, convinced Time's board of directors that owning a daily newspaper in the national capital would bring a unique sense of prestige and political access. The paper's labor unions agreed to work concessions that Shepley demanded.

An effort to draw readers with localized special "zonal" metro news sections, however, did little to help circulation. The Star lacked the resources to produce the sort of ultra-local coverage zonal editions demanded and ended up running many of the same regional stories in all of its local sections. An economic downturn resulted in monthly losses of over $1 million. Overall, the Star lost some $85 million following the acquisition before Time's board decided to give up. On August 7, 1981, after 128 years, The Washington Star ceased publication. In the bankruptcy sale, the Post purchased the land and buildings owned by the Star, including its printing presses.

Many of the people who worked for the Star went to work for the newly formed The Washington Times, which began operations in May 1982, almost a year after the Star went out of business.

Writers who worked at the Star in its last days included Michael Isikoff, Howard Kurtz, Fred Hiatt, Jane Mayer, Chris Hanson, Jeremiah O'Leary, Chuck Conconi, Crispin Sartwell, Maureen Dowd, novelist Randy Sue Coburn, Michael DeMond Davis, Lance Gay, Jules Witcover, Jack Germond, Judy Bachrach, Lyle Denniston, Fred Barnes, Gloria Borger, Kate Sylvester, and Mary McGrory. The paper's staff also included editorial cartoonist Pat Oliphant from 1976 to 1981.

== Washington Star Syndicate ==
The Washington Star Syndicate
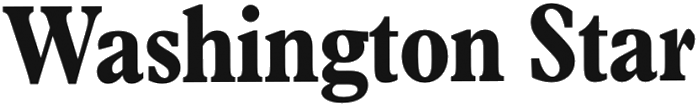
- Industry: Print syndication
- Founded: May 1965; 61 years ago
- Defunct: May 1979; 47 years ago
- Fate: acquired by Universal Press Syndicate
- Headquarters: 444 Madison Avenue, Manhattan, New York City, New York, U.S., U.S.
- Key people: Harry E. Elmlark
- Services: Columns, comic strips
- Owner: The Washington Star Company (1965–1978); Time Inc. (1978–1979)

The Washington Star Syndicate operated from 1965 to 1979. The newspaper had sporadically syndicated material over the years — for instance, Gibson "Gib" Crockett, a Washington Star editorial cartoonist, was syndicated from 1947 to 1967 — but didn't become official until May 1965, when it purchased the remaining comic strips, columns, and features of the George Matthew Adams Service (Adams had died in 1962).

The Washington Star Syndicate distributed the columns of James Beard, William F. Buckley Jr., James J. Kilpatrick, and Mary McGrory, among others. It began by syndicating a few strips — including Edwina Dumm's strips Alec the Great and Cap Stubbs and Tippie — it had inherited from the Adams Service; one successful strip the syndicate launched was Morrie Brickman's The Small Society, which was published in over 300 papers, including 35 foreign publications. Otherwise, from about 1971 onward, the syndicate no longer distributed comic strips.

In February 1978, the Washington Star Syndicate was sold (along with its parent company) to Time Inc. In May 1979, the Universal Press Syndicate acquired the Star Syndicate from the remaining assets of the Washington Star Company. As a result of this merger, beginning in June 1979, popular existing Universal Press strips like Doonesbury, Cathy, and Tank McNamara left the pages of The Washington Post and began appearing in The Washington Star. (When the Star folded in August 1981, those strips returned to the Post.)

=== Washington Star Syndicate strips and panels ===
- Alec the Great by Edwina Dumm (May 1965–1969)—inherited from the George Matthew Adams Service
- Buenos Dias by Ed Nofziger (May 1965 – 1967)—inherited from the George Matthew Adams Service
- Cap Stubbs and Tippie by Edwina Dumm (May 30, 1965 – September 3, 1966)—inherited from the George Matthew Adams Service
- The Small Society by Morrie Brickman (1966–1979)—continued by Universal Press Syndicate until 1984 and then King Features Syndicate
- The Smith Family by George and Virginia Smith (1951–1994)—inherited from the George Matthew Adams Service, syndication continued by Universal Press Syndicate.
- Stoker the Broker by Henry Boltinoff—acquired from Columbia Features
- Uncle Charlie by Peter Laing (1965–1978)—inherited from the George Matthew Adams Service

== Pulitzer Prizes ==
- 1944: Clifford K. Berryman, for Editorial Cartooning, "But Where Is the Boat Going?"
- 1950: James T. Berryman, Editorial Cartooning, for "All Set for a Super-Secret Session in Washington."
- 1958: George Beveridge, Pulitzer Prize for Local Reporting, for "Metro, City of Tomorrow."
- 1959: Mary Lou Werner, Pulitzer Prize for Local Reporting, "For her comprehensive year-long coverage of the (school) integration crisis."
- 1960: Miriam Ottenberg, Pulitzer Prize for Local Reporting, "For a series of seven articles exposing a used-car racket in Washington, D.C., that victimized many unwary buyers."
- 1966: Haynes Johnson, for National Reporting, for his distinguished coverage of the civil rights conflict centered about Selma, Alabama, and particularly his reporting of its aftermath.
- 1974: James R. Polk, National Reporting, for his disclosure of alleged irregularities in the financing of the campaign to re-elect President Nixon in 1972.
- 1975: Mary McGrory, Commentary, for her commentary on public affairs during 1974.
- 1979: Edwin M. Yoder Jr., Editorial Writing.
- 1981: Jonathan Yardley, Criticism, for book reviews.

== See also ==
- Pauline Frederick
- Harry Post Godwin, City Editor from 1881 to 1897
- Bob Rae, former Ontario NDP Leader and interim Liberal of Party of Canada leader was a paperboy in Washington, D.C. from the late 1950s to 1961. His most prominent customers were Estes Kefauver and Richard Nixon
- Muldergate, South African scandal involving planned purchase of the paper
