= Columbus, Ontario =

Columbus
- Unincorporated community
- Interactive map of Columbus
- Coordinates: 43°58′58″N 78°54′39″W
- Country: Canada
- Province: Ontario
- Regional municipality: Durham
- City: Oshawa
- Settled: 1830
- Time zone: UTC-5 (EST)
  - Summer (DST): UTC-4 (EDT)
- Forward sortation area: L1G, L1H
- Area codes: 905 and 289
- NTS Map: 030M15
- GNBC Code: FASJW

Columbus is a community in the Canadian province of Ontario, located within the city of Oshawa.

The main road is Columbus Rd. There is one church serving the area on Simcoe St. There is also a golf course. One bus serves the area on its way to Port Perry and Uxbridge from Durham College. It runs every two hours.

There are a few farms in the area dotting Ritson Road and Simcoe Street. The village's population is about 325. Most people commute to Oshawa or Toronto. The nearest grocery store is at Port Perry or Oshawa. Columbus is about 15 minutes from Oshawa and 60 minutes from Toronto.

== History ==
The first settlers to the village in 1830 were surnames such as: Adams, Ashton, Roberts, Clark, Grass, Power, Perreman, Wilcoxson and others; of Irish descent were the Howden brothers. The community was first known as English Corners because most of the land was sold to people of some wealth, most of whom were English. When the post office was established in 1847, the community was named Columbus, possibly after the 15th century explorer Christopher Columbus. Its first postmaster was Robert Skirving.

In 1853, the first council for the Township of East Whitby was formed, and the first reeve was John Ratcliffe. From this point in time on to 1870, the village grew to over 300 inhabitants. The village had: a township hall, four churches, blacksmiths, a post office, an Orange Hall, stores, carpenters, shoe shops, tailors, dressmakers, mills, asheries, copper shops, a tannery, a furniture factory, a harness shop, and four hotels.

Electricity first came to the area in 1883, just west of Columbus at the village of Empire Mills. Electricity came to Columbus later in 1919, with street lights added by 1928.

== Empire Mills ==
Just west of Columbus on a branch of the Oshawa Creek at the SE corner of Thornton Rd. and Columbus Rd. existed the largest mill in the entire area. Here, in 1835, the impressive, four-storey woollen mills of Mathewson and Ratcliffe were operated by a crew of 50, which was much larger than the other mills that dotted the landscape.

The men were brought in from northern England to work the mill. They resided in a boarding home and small cottages. In 1850, the company was sold to the Empire Mills Company. The area grew into a village that had a church, a store, a school, wooden sidewalks and by 1883, an electrical lighting system powered by the mill dam. It may have been the first of its kind in the entire area.

When a major railway was built well west near Markham, the company moved. The old mill struggled under new ownership until 1890 when a flood washed out the dam. It was never rebuilt and the village died. A few old century homes survive; two cemeteries from the area survive: the Dryden Baptist Cemetery and St. Paul's Anglican Cemetery.

The 1878 Beers Map shows the village at Lot 16 Concession 6–7 in the former Township of East Whitby just west of Columbus. One mile west of the four corners of Columbus stood St. Paul's Anglican Church which was burned to the ground in 1922. Just by the church stood the woollen mills and a number of houses. Another church just west serviced the village as well. Called the Dryden Baptist Church, it was named after James Dryden, who owned the property across the road from it. This church still stands, but now sits on property across the road from the Nesbitt's.

A famous naturalized American was born here. Walt Mason: 1862–1939. He became an American (originally Canadian). Walt was a newspaper writer and humourist, often called "Poet Laureate of American Democracy". Mason was married in 1893 to Ella Foss, of Wooster, Ohio. His father, a dyer, died in an accident at the Empire Mill when he fell down a shaft line. Walt was just four years of age at the time. He also worked in the same mill when he was older. Walt's home still stands, but was moved a bit west and is now owned by Fred Nesbitt.

Ten other mills operated in the area, one just upstream from Empire Mills (run by John Bickle and H. Hill), one just west by Dryden Cemetery, two in Brooklin, one at Winchester Golf Course (on the old H. Bickle farm), one in Chubtown, two just north of Chubtown at Goodman's Mills (another ghost town), and two just west of Raglan.

== See also ==
- List of communities in Ontario
