= Risky Business =

1983 film by Paul Brickman

- Theatrical release poster by Drew Struzan
- Directed by: Paul Brickman
- Written by: Paul Brickman
- Produced by: Jon Avnet; Steve Tisch
- Starring: Tom Cruise; Rebecca De Mornay
- Cinematography: Bruce Surtees; Reynaldo Villalobos
- Edited by: Richard Chew
- Music by: Tangerine Dream
- Production company: The Geffen Film Company
- Distributed by: Warner Bros.
- Release date: August 5, 1983
- Running time: 99 minutes
- Country: United States
- Language: English
- Budget: $6.2 million
- Box office: $63.5 million

Risky Business is a 1983 American coming-of-age teen comedy film written and directed by Paul Brickman (in his directorial debut) and starring Tom Cruise and Rebecca De Mornay. It follows the sexual exploits of high school senior Joel Goodsen (Cruise), who is staying home alone during his parents' vacation trip and meets a call girl named Lana (De Mornay). The film is considered to be Cruise's breakout role.

Risky Business was released theatrically in the United States by Warner Bros. on August 5, 1983. A commercial and critical success, the film grossed more than $63 million at the box office, making it the tenth-highest-grossing film of 1983 in the United States, and received acclaim, with many comparing it to The Graduate (1967). Cruise's performance earned him the first Golden Globe Award nomination of his career. Retrospective critical analysis has recognized Risky Business as one of the best high school and teen films of all time.

== Plot ==
High school senior Joel Goodsen lives with his wealthy parents in the Chicago North Shore community of Glencoe. His father wants him to attend Princeton University, his alma mater, and arranges an admissions interview for him. Meanwhile, Joel worries about his SAT scores and his performance in Future Enterprisers, an extracurricular program in which students establish and operate small businesses.

When Joel's parents leave on a trip, his friend Miles encourages him to enjoy his newfound freedom. On his first night alone, Joel raids his parents' liquor cabinet, blares the stereo, and dances around the living room in his briefs to "Old Time Rock and Roll". The following night, despite Joel's objections, Miles arranges for a call girl named Jackie to visit him. Upon discovering that Jackie is a burly cross-dresser, Joel pays him simply to leave. As Jackie departs, he gives Joel the number of another escort, Lana. Unable to sleep, Joel hesitantly calls Lana, who turns out to be an attractive young woman, and the two spend the night together.

The next morning, Lana demands $300 for her services. Joel goes to the bank but returns to find that she has left with his mother's expensive Steuben glass egg. Joel and Miles later pick up Lana downtown and demand that she return the egg, but her pimp, Guido, confronts them with a gun. Fleeing in his father's prized Porsche 928, Joel outmaneuvers Guido during a car chase, only to learn that the egg is at Guido's apartment. Joel allows Lana to stay at his house while he attends school but returns to find that she has invited another escort, Vicki, without his permission. When Joel objects, the women leave but encounter Guido outside and tell him that they now work for Joel. To avoid further confrontation, Joel reluctantly lets them stay another night.

Joel, Lana, Vicki, and Joel's friend Barry later go out and smoke marijuana. While retrieving her purse, Lana accidentally knocks the Porsche out of gear, sending it rolling onto a pier that collapses beneath it, plunging the car into Lake Michigan. Horrified by the estimated repair cost, Joel decides to host a pay-to-enter party while turning his house into a brothel for one night, staffed by Lana's fellow escorts. Donning Ray-Ban sunglasses and a sport coat, Joel adopts a laid-back business persona and persuades many of his male classmates to attend the party. However, he has forgotten about his scheduled interview with Princeton admissions officer Bill Rutherford, who arrives during the party. Their conversation is repeatedly interrupted by partygoers, and Rutherford is unimpressed by Joel's mediocre academic record. Unfazed by the interview, Joel leaves the party with Lana, and the two board a Chicago "L" train, where they have sex.

The party proves highly profitable, and Rutherford is seduced by one of the escorts. After retrieving the repaired Porsche the following day, Joel returns home to discover that Guido has stolen the household furnishings and demands payment for their return. Joel pays Guido, and, with the help of his friends, restores everything to its original place just before his parents arrive, though his mother notices a crack in the glass egg. Later, Joel's father congratulates him, revealing that Rutherford was impressed by Joel and has recommended him for admission to Princeton.

Joel meets Lana at a high-rise restaurant overlooking Chicago, where they speculate about their future together. Lana expresses a desire to continue seeing him, and Joel jokes that it will cost her. In a closing voice-over delivered in the style of a Future Enterprisers pitch, Joel reveals that he is in the business of "human fulfillment" and that his venture grossed $8,000.

== Cast ==
- Tom Cruise as Joel Goodsen
- Rebecca De Mornay as Lana
- Joe Pantoliano as Guido
- Nicholas Pryor as Mr. Goodsen
- Janet Carroll as Mrs. Goodsen
- Richard Masur as Bill Rutherford
- Curtis Armstrong as Miles Dalby
- Bronson Pinchot as Barry
- Shera Danese as Vicki
- Raphael Sbarge as Glenn
- Bruce A. Young as Jackie
- Kevin Anderson as Chuck
- Nathan Davis as Business Teacher
- Fern Persons as Lab Teacher
- Anne Lockhart as Babysitter
- Megan Mullally as call girl

== Production ==
Sean Penn, Gary Sinise, Kevin Bacon, John Cusack and Tom Hanks all auditioned for the role of Joel Goodsen. Michelle Pfeiffer was offered the role of Lana, but turned it down.

Filming took place from mid-July to late November 1982, in locations throughout the Chicago metropolitan area.

== Soundtrack ==
The film was scored by Tangerine Dream. Their music fills nearly half of the soundtrack album. Also included are songs by Muddy Waters, Prince ("DMSR"), Jeff Beck, Journey, Phil Collins ("In the Air Tonight"), and the song for which the film is best known, "Old Time Rock and Roll" by Bob Seger.

The film also includes "Hungry Heart" by Bruce Springsteen, "Every Breath You Take" by The Police, and "Swamp" by Talking Heads. The LP and CD versions of the soundtrack include two different versions of "Love on a Real Train (Risky Business)," both of which are different recordings from the version used in the film for the final love scene or closing credits.

== Release ==
Risky Business premiered in New York and Los Angeles on August 5, 1983.

=== Home media ===
The film was released DVD in August 1997, and on Blu-ray by Warner Bros. in 2008. Extra features included audio commentary with the director and Cruise, a featurette titled The Dream Is Always the Same: The Story of "Risky Business", an alternate ending, screen tests and trailer. The Criterion Collection released the film on 4K Ultra HD and Blu-ray disc in July 2024, with a new 4K digital restoration of both the director's cut and original theatrical release, with bonus material from the 2008 Blu-ray release. New special features include interviews with Avnet and casting director Nancy Klopper and a conversation between editor Richard Chew and film historian Bobbie O'Steen.

== Reception ==
=== Box office ===
The film opened in 670 theaters, with an opening weekend gross of $4,275,327. It went on to gross a total of $63.5 million domestically.

=== Critical response ===
The film holds a 93% rating on the review aggregate website Rotten Tomatoes based on 54 reviews, with an average of 7.3/10, with the site's consensus stating; "Featuring one of Tom Cruise's best early performances, Risky Business is a sharp, funny examination of teen angst that doesn't stop short of exploring dark themes".

Risky Business is considered by many critics as one of the best films of 1983. Janet Maslin, in her 1983 review of the film for The New York Times, called it "part satire, part would-be suburban poetry and part shameless showing off" and said the film "shows an abundance of style", though "you would be hard pressed to find a film whose hero's problems are of less concern to the world at large." She called De Mornay "disarming as a call girl who looks more like a college girl" and credits Cruise with making "Joel's transformation from straight arrow to entrepreneur about as credible as it can be made".

Roger Ebert of The Chicago Sun-Times gave Risky Business his top rating of 4-stars, saying while the concept at a glance might seem trite, the film was actually "one of the smartest, funniest, most perceptive satires in a long time" that "not only invites comparison with The Graduate it earns it." He praised Cruise for effectively personifying "male adolescent guilt" and also lauded DeMornay for rising above what could have been a type of stock character to create a "very complicated young woman". Brickman's script was highlighted as the "very best thing about the movie is its dialogue."

Variety said the film was like a "promising first novel, with all the pros and cons that come with that territory" and complimented Brickman on "the stylishness and talent of his direction".

=== Accolades ===
| Year | Award | Category | Nominated work | Result | Ref. |
|---|---|---|---|---|---|
| 1984 | Golden Globe Awards | Best Actor in a Motion Picture – Musical or Comedy | Tom Cruise | Nominated | |
| 1984 | Writers Guild of America Awards | Best Comedy Written Directly for the Screenplay | Paul Brickman | Nominated | |

== Legacy ==
The remastered 25th-anniversary edition offers "both the upbeat studio ending and Mr. Brickman's original, more tentative and melancholic conclusion".

In 2015 the film was No. 31 on Entertainment Weekly's list of the 50 Best High School Movies. The magazine called the film a "sharp satire of privileged suburban teens", portraying the "soul-crushing pressure to be perfect."

In the years since the film's release, the iconic scene featuring Cruise's character sliding across the floor, dancing in just his pink shirt, socks, and white briefs to Bob Seger's rendition of "Old Time Rock and Roll" has been recreated in episodes of many television series, as well as in films, parodies, viral videos and advertisements. The song was No. 100 on AFI's 100 Years ... 100 Songs list.
