= Cap Stubbs and Tippie =

American comic strip by Edwina Dumm

- Edwina Dumm drew this panel sequence for Cap Stubbs and Tippie in 1945.
- Author: Edwina Dumm
- Current status/schedule: Concluded
- Launch date: August 21, 1918
- End date: September 3, 1966
- Alternate name(s): Cap Stubbs; Tippie & Cap Stubbs; Tippie
- Syndicate(s): George Matthew Adams Service (1918–1965); The Washington Star Syndicate (1965–1966)
- Genre: Humor

Cap Stubbs and Tippie is a syndicated newspaper comic strip created by the cartoonist Edwina Dumm that ran for 48 years, from August 21, 1918, to September 3, 1966. At times the title changed to Tippie & Cap Stubbs or Tippie.

== Publication history ==
After Dumm's strip about the young Cap and his dog Tippie debuted August 21, 1918, in an Ohio newspaper, The Columbus Monitor, she moved to New York City and Cap Stubbs and Tippie was syndicated by the George Matthew Adams Service. Starting November 25, 1934, the Adams service partnered with King Features Syndicate to produce a Tippie Sunday page. The Sunday strip ended in 1966.

When the George Matthew Adams Service went out of business in 1965, Dumm's strip was picked up by The Washington Star Syndicate. Dumm continued to write and draw Tippie until her 1966 retirement (which brought the strip to an end).

== Characters and story ==
The strip focused on a young boy, Joseph "Cap" Stubbs, and his dog, Tippie. The many adventures of Cap and Tippie led to the discomfort of his parents and his grandmother, Sara Bailey, who clearly doted on the boy despite the fact that his high energy and general boyishness constantly drove her to distraction.

== Reception ==
Discussing Cap Stubbs and Tippie, comics historian Ron Goulart stated that Dumm "drew in a warm, homey style and was especially good with animals."

=== Reprints ===
In 2013, The Library of American Comics reprinted one year of the strip (1945) in their LoAC Essentials line of books.
