= Edwina Dumm =

American cartoonist

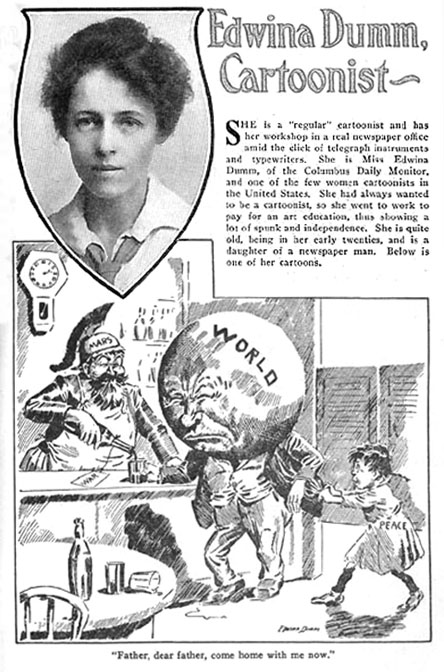
- The magazine Cartoons featured Edwina Dumm in its January 1917 issue.
- Born: 1893 Upper Sandusky, Ohio, U.S.
- Died: April 28, 1990 (aged 96–97) New York, New York, U.S.
- Area: Cartoonist
- Notable works: Cap Stubbs and Tippie (1918–1966); Alec the Great (1931-1969)
- Awards: National Cartoonists Society Gold Key Award, 1978

Frances Edwina Dumm (1893 – April 28, 1990) was a writer-artist who drew the comic strip Cap Stubbs and Tippie for nearly five decades; she is also notable as America's first full-time female editorial cartoonist. She used her middle name for the signature on her comic strip, signed simply Edwina.

== Biography ==
One of the earliest female syndicated cartoonists, Dumm was born in Upper Sandusky, Ohio, and lived in Marion and Washington Courthouse, Ohio throughout her youth before the family settled down in Columbus. Anna Gilmore Dennis was her mother, and her father, Frank Edwin Dumm, was a playwright-actor who later worked as a newspaper reporter. Dumm's paternal grandfather, Robert D. Dumm, owned a newspaper in Upper Sandusky which Frank Dumm later inherited. Her brother, Robert Dennis Dumm, was a reporter for the Columbus Dispatch, and art editor for Cole Publishing Company's Farm & Fireside magazine.

In 1911, she graduated from Central High School in Columbus, Ohio, and then took the Cleveland-based Landon School of Illustration and Cartooning correspondence course. Her name was later featured in Landon's advertisements. While enrolled in the correspondence course, she also took a business course and worked as a stenographer at the Columbus Board of Education.

In 1915, Dumm was hired by the short-lived Republican newspaper, the Columbus Monitor, to be a full-time cartoonist. Her first cartoon was published on August 7, 1915, in the debut issue of the paper. During her years at the Monitor she provided a variety of features including a comic strip called The Meanderings of Minnie about a young tomboy girl and her dog, Lillie Jane, and a full-page editorial cartoon feature, Spot-Light Sketches. She drew editorial cartoons for the Monitor from its first edition (August 7, 1915) until the paper folded (July 1917). In the Monitor, her Spot-Light Sketches was a full-page feature of editorial cartoons, and some of these promoted women's issues. Elisabeth Israels Perry, in the introduction to Alice Sheppard's Cartooning for Suffrage (1994), wrote that artists such as Blanche Ames Ames, Lou Rogers and Edwina Dumm produced:

...a visual rhetoric that helped create a climate more favorable to change in America's gender relations... By the close of the suffrage campaign, women's art reflected the new values of feminism, broadened its targets, and attempted to restate the significance of the movement.

After the Monitor folded, Dumm moved to New York City, where she continued her art studies at the Art Students League. She was hired by the George Matthew Adams Service to create Cap Stubbs and Tippie, a family strip following the lives of a boy Cap, his dog Tippie, their family, and neighbors. Cap's grandmother, Sara Bailey, is prominently featured, and may have been based on Dumm's own grandmother, Sarah Jane Henderson, who lived with their family. The strip was strongly influenced by Mark Twain’s Adventures of Huckleberry Finn, as well as Dumm’s favorite comic, Buster Brown by Richard F. Outcault. Dumm worked very fast; according to comics historian Martin Sheridan, she could pencil a daily strip in an hour.

Her love of dogs is evident in her strips as well as her illustrations for books and magazines, such as Sinbad, her weekly dog page which ran in both Life and the London Tatler. She illustrated Alexander Woollcott's Two Gentlemen and a Lady. For Sonnets from the Pekinese and Other Doggerel (Macmillan, 1936) by Burges Johnson (1877–1963), she illustrated "Losted" and other poems.

From the 1931 through the 1960s, she drew another dog for the newspaper feature Alec the Great, in which she illustrated verses written by her brother, Robert Dennis Dumm. Their collaboration was published as a book in 1946. In the late 1940s, she drew the covers for sheet music by her friend and neighbor, Helen Thomas, who did both music and lyrics. During the 1940s, she also contributed Tippie features to various comic books including All-American Comics and Dell Comics.

In 1950, Dumm, Hilda Terry, and Barbara Shermund became the first women to be inducted into the National Cartoonists Society.

When the George Matthew Adams Service went out of business in 1965, Dumm's strip was picked up by The Washington Star Syndicate. Dumm continued to write and draw Tippie until her 1966 retirement (which brought the strip to an end).

== Personal life ==
Dumm never married. After she retired from her comic strip, she remained active with watercolor paintings, photography and helping the elderly at her New York City apartment building when she was well into her eighties.

== Awards ==
She was a recipient of the National Cartoonists Society Gold Key Award in 1978, and remained the only woman to win this award until 2013.

In 2026, Dumm was selected for inclusion in the Eisner Hall of Fame.

== Exhibitions ==
- Edwina Dumm: 2012 digital exhibition curated by Lucy Shelton Caswell
