= List of DC Comics reprint collections =

DC Comics reprint collections

This is a list of DC Comics reprint collections including trade paperbacks, hardcovers, and other special format collections.

== Major lines ==
Volumes released as a part of these lines are not included in the list below.

- DC Archive Editions
- DC Chronicles
- DC Comics Absolute Edition
- DC Omnibus
- DC Compendium
- DC Deluxe Editions
- Showcase Presents
- DC Comics Classics Library
- DC Finest
- DC Compact Comics
- DC Comics Graphic Novel Collection
- DC Comics – The Legend of Batman
- DC Heroes and Villains Collection

== DC Deluxe Editions ==
DC Deluxe Editions are an oversized hardcover comic reprint format from DC Comics. The books feature the same dimensions as the company's Omnibus line (~7.5" x 11"), although typically with fewer pages per volume. Like the Omnibus line, Deluxe Editions are printed in full color, on high quality paper stock and include multiple comics per volume. Deluxe Editions typically feature shorter runs of comics, including one-off stories that would not support a larger omnibus collection, though in some cases, material originally collected in Deluxe Editions has also been collected into Omnibuses.

Character/group	Title	Vol. #	Years covered	Material collected	Pages	Publication date	ISBN
100 Bullets		1	1999–2001	100 Bullets #1–19; "Silencer Night" from Vertigo: Winter's Edge #3	456	October 18, 2011	978-1401232016
100 Bullets		2	2001–2002	100 Bullets #20–36	416	April 12, 2012	978-1401233723
100 Bullets		3	2002–2005	100 Bullets #37–58	528	September 25, 2012	978-1401237295
100 Bullets		4	2005–2007	100 Bullets #59–80	512	April 16, 2013	978-1401238070
100 Bullets		5	2007–2009	100 Bullets #81–100	512	December 3, 2013	978-1401242718
Adam Strange	Adam Strange: Between Two Worlds	Adam Strange: Between Two Worlds	1990–2004	Adam Strange (1990) #1–3, JLA #20–21 and (2004) 1–8	408	March 14, 2023	978-1779521460
Animal Man	Animal Man by Grant Morrison: 30th Anniversary	1	1988–1989	Animal Man #1–13; "The Myth of Creation" from Secret Origins #39	368	December 18, 2018	978-1401285470
Animal Man	Animal Man by Grant Morrison: 30th Anniversary	2	1989–1990	Animal Man #14–26	360	September 8, 2020	978-1779505507
Aquaman	The Search for Mera	The Search for Mera	1968–1969	Aquaman #40–48	216	December 4, 2018	978-1401285227
Aquaman	Deadly Waters	Deadly Waters	1970–1971	Aquaman #49–56	208	August 11, 2020	978-1779502940
Aquaman	The Death of a Prince	The Death of a Prince	1973–1978	Adventure Comics #435–437, 441–445; Aquaman #57–63	336	February 4, 2020	978-1779500953
Aquaman	The Atlantis Chronicles	The Atlantis Chronicles	1990	Atlantis Chronicles #1–7	344	November 7, 2017	978-1401274399
Aquaman	Underworld	Underworld	2017–2018	Aquaman (vol. 8) #25–30	160	November 20, 2020	978-1401285043
Aquaman	Aquaman: 80 Years of the King of the Seven Seas		1941–2021	Collects stories from Aquaman #0–37, JLA: Our Worlds at War #1, Aquaman #17, Outsiders: Five of a Kind – Metamorpho/Aquaman #1, Adventure Comics #120–137, 232–266, 269–475, More Fun Comics #73, Aquaman #11–35, 46–62, Aquaman #1; Aquaman #1; Aquaman Special #1 and Aquaman #25.	440	February 14, 2023	978-1779510198
Arrowverse	Crisis on Infinite Earth: Paragons Rising	Crisis on Infinite Earth: Paragons Rising	2020	Crisis on Infinite Earths Giant #1–2	128	July 7, 2020	978-1779505095
Batgirl	Year One	Year One	2003	Batgirl: Year One #1–9	240	February 26, 2019	978-1401287931
Batman	The Dark Knight Saga	The Dark Knight Saga	1986–2002	Batman: The Dark Knight Returns #1–4; The Dark Knight Strikes Again #1–3	512	November 10, 2015	978-1401256913
Batman	Year One	Year One	1987	Batman #404–407	144	March 20, 2012	978-1401233426
Batman	Year One	Year One	1987	Batman #404–407	144	September 6, 2017	978-1401272944
Batman	Year Two: 30th Anniversary		1987	Detective Comics #575–578; Batman: Full Circle	176	November 28, 2017	978-1401274566
Batman	A Death in the Family	A Death in the Family	1988	Batman #426–429, plus "A Lonely Place of Dying" from Batman #440–442 and The New Titans #60–61	280	April 13, 2021	978-1779509178
Batman	The Killing Joke	The Killing Joke	1988	Batman: The Killing Joke	64	March 19, 2008	978-5012256263
Batman	The Killing Joke	The Killing Joke	1988	Adds stories from Batman: Black and White #4 and Countdown to Final Crisis #31, along with numerous Batman and Joker covers and sketches by Brian Bolland.	96	September 11, 2019	978-1401294052
Batman	Arkham Asylum	Arkham Asylum	1989	Arkham Asylum: A Serious House on Serious Earth	232	November 5, 2014	978-1401251253
Batman	Arkham Asylum	Arkham Asylum	1989	Arkham Asylum: A Serious House on Serious Earth	232	October 12, 2021	978-1779513175
Batman	The 1989 Movie Adaptation		1989	Batman: The Official Comic Adaptation of the Warner Bros. Motion Picture	144	November 20, 2019	978-1779500502
Batman	Gothic	Gothic	1990	Batman: Legends of the Dark Knight #6–10	144	July 22, 2015	978-1401255169
Batman	Gotham by Gaslight	Gotham by Gaslight	1990	Gotham by Gaslight: An Alternate History of the Batman; Batman: Master of the Future; Countdown Presents: The Search for Ray Palmer: Gotham by Gaslight #1, and Convergence: Shazam! #1–2	208	October 6, 2020	978-1401299828
Batman	The Long Halloween Deluxe Edition - The Prequel: Haunted Knight		1993–1995	Batman: Legends of the Dark Knight Halloween Special #1, Batman: Madness – A Legends of the Dark Knight Halloween Special #1, and Batman: Ghosts, A Legends of the Dark... #1	200	October 6, 2022	978-1779516381
Batman	Batman Adventures: Mad Love	Batman Adventures: Mad Love	1993	The Batman Adventures: Mad Love	144	April 15, 2015	978-1401255121
Batman	The Long Halloween	The Long Halloween	1996–1997	Batman: The Long Halloween 1–13; Absolute Batman: The Long Halloween	416	October 12, 2021	978-1779512697
Batman	The Long Halloween Deluxe Edition - The Sequel: Dark Victory	The Long Halloween Deluxe Edition - The Sequel: Dark Victory	1999–2000	Batman: Dark Victory #1–13 and Batman: Dark Victory (New Edition)	416	January 18, 2022	978-1779514837
Batman	Ego and Other Tails	Ego and Other Tails	2000–2005	Batman: Ego; Catwoman: Selina's Big Score; material from Batman: Gotham Knights #23, 33; Solo #1, #5	272	March 15, 2017	978-1401272395
Batman	Hush 15th Anniversary		2002–2003	Batman #608–619; material from Wizard #0	376	November 8, 2017	978-1401276492
Batman	Arkham Asylum: Living Hell	Arkham Asylum: Living Hell	2003	Arkham Asylum: Living Hell #1–6	176	June 4, 2014	978-1401247515
Batman	Death and the Maidens	Death and the Maidens	2003–2004	Batman: Death and the Maidens #1–9	240	January 25, 2017	978-1401265939
Batman	Batman by Brian Azzarello & Eduardo Risso	Batman by Brian Azzarello & Eduardo Risso	2003–2004	Batman #620–625; Batman: Gotham Knights #8; Flashpoint: Batman – Knight of Vengeance #1–3; Wednesday Comics #1–12	240	June 28, 2017	978-1401271015
Batman	The Man Who Laughs	The Man Who Laughs	2003–2005	Batman: The Man Who Laughs; Detective Comics #784–786	216	October 27, 2020	978-1779503022
Batman	Batman: Under the Red Hood	Batman: Under the Red Hood	2004-2010	Batman #635-641, 645–650, Annual #25, Red Hood: The Lost Days #1-6, pages from Batman #617-618	544	September 5, 2023	978-1779523143
Batman	City of Crime	City of Crime	2005–2006	Detective Comics #800–808, 811–814	304	March 11, 2020	978-1401299484
Batman	Year 100 and Other Tales		2006	Batman: Year 100 #1–4; Batman Chronicles #11; Batman: Gotham Knights #3; Solo #3	240	October 14, 2015	978-1401258078
Batman	The Black Glove	The Black Glove	2006–2008	Batman #655–658, #663–669, #672–675	384	June 20, 2012	978-1401233365
Batman	R.I.P.	R.I.P.	2008	Batman #676–683	208	February 11, 2009	978-1848562035
Batman	Batman: Gotham After Midnight	Batman: Gotham After Midnight	2008–2009	Batman: Gotham After Midnight #1-12	368	December 12, 2023	978-1779522979
Batman	Whatever Happened to the Caped Crusader?	Whatever Happened to the Caped Crusader?	2009	Batman #685; Detective Comics #852; Secret Origins (vol. 2) #36, Special #1; Batman: Black and White #2	128	July 15, 2009	978-1401223038
Batman	Whatever Happened to the Caped Crusader?	Whatever Happened to the Caped Crusader?	2009	Batman #685; Detective Comics #852; Secret Origins (vol. 2) #36, Special #1; Batman: Black and White #2	128	August 18, 2020	978-1779504906
Batman	The Return of Bruce Wayne	The Return of Bruce Wayne	2010	Batman: The Return of Bruce Wayne #1–6	232	February 2, 2011	978-1401229689
Batman	Batman Incorporated	Batman Incorporated	2011	Batman Incorporated #1–8; Batman Incorporated: Leviathan Strikes! #1	264	April 11, 2012	978-1401232122
Batman	Gates of Gotham	Gates of Gotham	2011	Batman: Gates of Gotham #1–5; material from Detective Comics Annual #12; Batman Annual #28	152	November 7, 2018	978-1401284206
Batman	The Dark Knight: Golden Dawn	1	2011	Batman: The Dark Knight #1–5	160	January 4, 2012	978-1401232153
Batman	Batman: Noël	Batman: Noël	2011	Batman: Noël	112	November 2, 2021	978-1401232153
Batman	Batman by Francis Manapul and Brian Buccellato	Batman by Francis Manapul and Brian Buccellato	2014–2015	Detective Comics (vol. 2) #30–34, 37–44; Sneak Peek Detective Comics #1	328	November 21, 2018	978-1779503916
Batman	Batman: Rebirth	1	2016–2017	Batman: Rebirth #1; Batman (vol. 3) #1–15	400	September 5, 2017	978-1401271329
Batman	Batman: Rebirth	2	2017	Batman (vol. 3) #16–32, Annual (vol. 2) #1	448	June 6, 2018	978-1401280352
Batman	Batman: Rebirth	3	2017–2018	Batman (vol. 3) #33–44, Annual (vol. 2) #2	328	December 5, 2018	978-1401285210
Batman	Batman: Rebirth	4	2018	Batman (vol. 3) #45–57; material from DC Nation #0	344	July 3, 2019	978-1401291884
Batman	Batman: Rebirth	5	2019	Batman (vol. 3) #58–69	288	July 28, 2020	978-1779503145
Batman	Batman: Rebirth	6	2019–2020	Batman (vol. 3) #70–85, Annual (vol. 2) #4; Batman Secret Files #2	496	July 26, 2022	978-1779515704
Batman	Batman Detective Comics: Rebirth	1	2016–2017	Detective Comics #934–949	388	November 1, 2017	978-1401276089
Batman	Batman Detective Comics: Rebirth	2	2017	Detective Comics #950–962	320	May 9, 2018	978-1401278571
Batman	Batman Detective Comics: Rebirth	3	2017–2018	Detective Comics #963–973, Annual (vol. 2) #1	296	October 24, 2018	978-1401284817
Batman	Batman Detective Comics: Rebirth	4	2018	Detective Comics #974–982	224	April 17, 2019	978-1401289102
Batman	Dark Knight Returns: The Last Crusade	Dark Knight Returns: The Last Crusade	2016	Dark Knight Returns: The Last Crusade	64	December 14, 2016	978-1401265069
Batman	Batman: White Knight	Batman: White Knight	2017–2018	Batman: White Knight #1–8	248	March 10, 2020	978-1779500649
Batman	Batman by Tom King & Lee Weeks	Batman by Tom King & Lee Weeks	2017–2019	Batman (vol. 3) #51–53, 67, Annual (vol. 2) #2; Batman/Elmer Fudd Special #1	184	November 17, 2020	978-1779505743
Batman	Detective Comics #1000		2019	Detective Comics #1000	176	June 12, 2018	978-1401294199
Batman	Detective Comics #1000		2019	Detective Comics #1000	176	August 13, 2024	978-1779528957
Batman	Detective Comics #1027		2020	Detective Comics #1027	176	November 24, 2020	978-1779506740
Batman	The Dark Knight Returns: The Golden Child	The Dark Knight Returns: The Golden Child	2019	The Dark Knight Returns: The Golden Child	80	September 15, 2020	978-1779503916
Batman	Batman: Curse of the White Knight	Batman: Curse of the White Knight	2019–2020	Batman: Curse of the White Knight #1–8 and Batman: White Knight Presents Von Freeze #1	280	September 27, 2022	978-1779516817
Batman	Batman by John Ridley	Batman by John Ridley	2020–2021	Batman Black & White (vol. 2) #3, Batman: The Joker War Zone #1, Future State: The Next Batman #1–4 and a previously unpublished story by John Ridley and Dustin Nguyen	128	June 29, 2021	978-1779511263
Batman	Detective Comics: 80 Years of Batman		1937–2014	Detective Comics #1, 20, 27, 38, 60, 64, 66, 140, 151, 153, 225, 233, 267, 298, 327, 359, 400, 437, 443, 457, 474, 482, 500, 567, 742; Detective Comics (vol. 2) #27	424	March 6, 2019	978-1401285388
Batman and Robin	Batman Reborn	1	2009–2010	Batman and Robin #1–6	168	April 7, 2010	978-1401225667
Batman and Robin	Batman vs. Robin	2	2010	Batman and Robin #7–12	168	November 10, 2010	978-1401228330
Batman and Robin	Batman and Robin Must Die!	3	2010–2011	Batman and Robin #13–16; Batman: The Return #1	168	May 11, 2011	978-1401230913
Batman and Robin	Dark Knight vs. White Knight	4	2011	Batman and Robin #17–25	208	January 25, 2012	978-1401233730
Batman/Catwoman	The Wedding Album	The Wedding Album	2017–2018	Batman (vol. 3) #24, 44, 50	136	September 5, 2018	978-1401286538
Batman/Deathblow	After the Fire	After the Fire	2002	Batman/Deathblow: After the Fire #1–3	168	February 20, 2013	978-1401237721
Batman/the Flash	Batman/Flash: The Button	Batman/Flash: The Button	2017	Batman (vol. 3) #21–22; The Flash (vol. 5) #21–22	104	October 11, 2017	978-1401276447
Batman/the Joker	Batman & The Joker: The Deadly Duo	Batman & The Joker: The Deadly Duo	2023	TBA	208	September 12, 2023	978-1779523105
Batman/Planetary			2003	Planetary/Batman: Night on Earth	96	June 7, 2011	978-1401231842
Batman/Spawn			1994-2022	Batman/Spawn: War Devil; Spawn/Batman; Batman/Spawn; a gallery of behind-the-scenes art	280	April 4, 2023	978-1779522818
Batman/Superman/Wonder Woman	Trinity	Trinity	2003	Batman/Superman/Wonder Woman: Trinity #1–3; Adventures of Superman #628; Wonder Woman (vol. 2) #204; Batman #627	208	January 13, 2016	978-1401256906
Batman/Teenage Mutant Ninja Turtles			2016	Batman/Teenage Mutant Ninja Turtles #1–6	256	July 4, 2018	978-1401280710
Batman/Two-Face	Face the Face	Face the Face	2006	Detective Comics #817–820; Batman #651–654	203	April 26, 2017	978-1401265724
The Batman Who Laughs			2019	The Batman Who Laughs (vol. 2) #1–7; The Batman Who Laughs: The Grim Knight #1	272	April 18, 2023	978-1779521477
Batwoman	Elegy	Elegy	2009–2010	Detective Comics #854–860	192	June 30, 2010	978-1848567948
Before Watchmen	Comedian/Rorschach	Comedian/Rorschach	2012	Before Watchmen: Comedian #1–6; Before Watchmen: Rorschach #1–4	256	July 10, 2013	978-1401238933
Before Watchmen	Minutemen/Silk Spectre	Minutemen/Silk Spectre	2012	Before Watchmen: Minutemen #1–6; Before Watchmen: Silk Spectre #1–4	288	June 26, 2013	978-1401238926
Before Watchmen	Nite Owl/Dr. Manhattan	Nite Owl/Dr. Manhattan	2012	Before Watchmen: Nite Owl #1–4; Before Watchmen: Dr. Manhattan #1–4; Before Watchmen: Moloch #1–2	288	July 10, 2013	978-1401238940
Before Watchmen	Ozymandias/Crimson Corsair	Ozymandias/Crimson Corsair	2012	Before Watchmen: Ozymandias #1–6; Curse of the Crimson Corsair; Before Watchmen: Dollar Bill #1	256	July 2, 2013	978-1401238957
Bill Willingham	Bad Doings and Bad Ideas	Bad Doings and Bad Ideas	1999–2004	Proposition Player #1–6; "It Takes a Village" from Flinch #7; The Dreaming #55; The Sandman Presents: Merv Pumpkinhead: Agent of D.R.E.A.M.; The Sandman Presents: Everything You Always Wanted to Know About Dreams...But Were Afraid to Ask; The Sandman Presents: The Thessaliad #1–4; The Sandman Presents: Thessaly: Witch For Hire #1–4; back-up stories from House of Mystery (vol. 2) #1–2, 7, 9, Halloween Annual #1	512	December 13, 2011	978-1401232450
Bizarro	Bizarro Comics	Bizarro Comics	2002–2005	Bizarro Comics HC; Bizarro World	440	July 27, 2021	978-1779510129
Black Orchid			1988–1989	Black Orchid #1–3	176	May 1, 2012	978-1401233358|-
Books of Magic	The Books of Magic 30th Anniversary		1990–1991	The Books of Magic #1–4	208	November 26, 2019	978-1779502339
Camelot 3000			1982–1985	Camelot 3000 #1–12	320	December 10, 2008	978-1401219420
Catwoman	The Long Halloween Deluxe Edition: Catwoman: When in Rome	The Long Halloween Deluxe Edition: Catwoman: When in Rome	2004–2005	Catwoman: When In Rome #1–6	168	March 22, 2022	978-1779515025
Cosmic Odyssey			1988–1989	Cosmic Odyssey #1–4	226	February 22, 2018	978-1401268152
Crisis on Infinite Earths	30th Anniversary Edition		1985–1986	Crisis on Infinite Earths #1–12; History of the DC Universe	496	October 7, 2015	978-1401258412
Crisis on Infinite Earths	35th Anniversary Edition		1985–1986	Crisis on Infinite Earths #1–12; History of the DC Universe	496	September 25, 2019	978-1401295363
Crisis on Infinite Earths	Crisis on Infinite Earths Companion	1	1985–1986	DC Comics Presents #78; All-Star Squadron #50–60; The Fury of Firestorm the Nuclear Man (vol. 2) #41–42; Green Lantern (vol. 2) #194–198	512	November 7, 2018	978-1401274597
Crisis on Infinite Earths	Crisis on Infinite Earths Companion	2	1985–1986	Detective Comics #558; DC Comics Presents #86; Swamp Thing (vol. 2) #44; The Losers Special #1; Legends of the DC Universe: Crisis on Infinite Earths #1; Infinity, Inc. #18–25, Annual #1; Justice League of America #244–245; New Teen Titans (vol. 2) #13–14	560	May 8, 2019	978-1401289218
Crisis on Infinite Earths	Crisis on Infinite Earths Companion	3	1985–1986	Amethyst #13; Blue Devil #17–18; Wonder Woman #327–329; Swamp Thing (vol. 2) #46; Legion of Super-Heroes (vol. 3) #16, #18; Superman #413–415; DC Comics Presents #84, 87–88, 95; Justice League of America Annual #3; The Omega Men #31, and a story from #33; Pages from Superman and Batman: World's Funniest #1	536	October 9, 2019	978-1401294489
Damian Wayne	Damian: Son of Batman	Damian: Son of Batman	2013-2014	Damian: Son of Batman #1–4; Batman #666	162	July 16, 2014	978-1401246426
Damian Wayne	Robin: Son of Batman by Patrick Gleason	Robin: Son of Batman by Patrick Gleason	2015	Robin: Son of Batman #1-13; DC Sneak Peek: Robin, Son of Batman #1	352	November 5, 2024	978-1779528322
Dark Nights: Metal	Dark Nights: Metal	Dark Nights: Metal	2017	Dark Nights: Metal #1–6	216	June 6, 2018	978-1401277321
Dark Nights: Metal	Dark Nights: Death Metal	Dark Nights: Death Metal	2020	Dark Nights: Death Metal 1–7	232	April 6, 2021	978-1779507945
Daytripper			2010	Daytripper #1–10	272	April 22, 2014	978-1401245115
DCeased			2019		240	October 3, 2023	978-1779523358
DC Comics Bombshells		1	2015	DC Comics Bombshells #1–6	216	August 29, 2018	978-1401281687
DC Comics Bombshells		2	2016	DC Comics Bombshells #7–12	216	July 31, 2019	978-1401292225
DC: The New Frontier			2004	DC: The New Frontier #1–6; Justice League: The New Frontier Special #1	520	February 11, 2015	978-1401248888
Death			1993–2003	The Sandman #8, 20; Death: The High Cost of Living #1–3; Death: The Time of Your Life #1–3; "A Winter's Tale" from Vertigo: Winter's Edge #2; "The Wheel" from 9–11 vol. 2; "Death and Venice" from The Sandman: Endless Nights; A Death Gallery #1; Death Talks About Life	320	April 5, 2022	978-1779515186
Deathblow			1993	Deathblow #1–12	304	March 19, 2014	978-1401247607
Dial H			2012–2013	Dial H #0–15	368	May 6, 2015	978-1401255206
DMZ		1	2006	DMZ #1–12	304	February 11, 2014	978-1401243005
DMZ		2	2007–2008	DMZ #13–28	416	June 17, 2014	978-1401247652
DMZ		3	2008–2009	DMZ #29–44	392	December 23, 2014	978-1401250003
DMZ		4	2009–2011	DMZ #45–59	384	June 7, 2015	978-1401254117
DMZ		5	2011–2012	DMZ #60–72	296	December 8, 2015	978-1401258436
The Doom Patrol	Doom Patrol by Gerard Way and Nick Derington	Doom Patrol by Gerard Way and Nick Derington	2016–2020	Doom Patrol #1–12 (2016–2018); tales from Doom Patrol Vol. 2: Nada and Doom Patrol: Weight of the Worlds #1–7	528	February 28, 2023	978-1779521385
Fables	Fables	1	2002–2003	Fables #1–10	264	October 6, 2009	978-1401224271
Fables	Fables	2	2003	Fables #11–18; Fables: The Last Castle	264	October 23, 2010	978-1401228798
Fables	Fables	3	2004	Fables #19–27	232	August 23, 2011	978-1401230975
Fables	Fables	4	2004–2005	Fables #28–33; Fables: 1001 Nights of Snowfall (graphic novel)	296	February 21, 2012	978-1401233907
Fables	Fables	5	2005–2006	Fables #34–45	304	June 5, 2012	978-1401234966
Fables	Fables	6	2006	Fables #46–51	224	February 26, 2013	978-1401237240
Fables	Fables	7	2006–2007	Fables #52–59, 64	240	September 3, 2013	978-1401240400
Fables	Fables	8	2007–2008	Fables #60–63, 65–69	232	February 11, 2014	978-1401242794
Fables	Fables	9	2008–2009	Fables #70–82	368	October 7, 2014	978-1401250041
Fables	Fables	10	2009	Fables #83–85; Jack of Fables #33–35; The Literals #1–3; Fables: Werewolves of the Heartland (graphic novel)	384	May 19, 2015	978-1401255213
Fables	Fables	11	2009–2011	Fables #86–100	456	November 3, 2015	978-1401258269
Fables	Fables	12	2011–2012	Fables #101–113	320	May 24, 2016	978-1401261382
Fables	Fables	13	2012–2013	Fables #114–129	300	September 27, 2016	978-1401264499
Fables	Fables	14	2013–2014	Fables #130–140	264	April 18, 2017	978-1401268565
Fables	Fables	15	2014–2015	Fables #141–150	384	November 28, 2017	978-1401274641
Fables	Fables	16	2022-2023	Fables #151-162	304	November 14, 2023	978-1779524027
Fables	Jack of Fables	1	2006–2007	Jack of Fables #1–16	416	March 14, 2017	978-1401264635
Fables	Jack of Fables	2	2008–2009	Jack of Fables #17–32	416	March 6, 2018	978-1401277710
Fables	Jack of Fables	3	2009–2011	Jack of Fables #36–50	400	March 10, 2020	978-1401295790
Fables	Fables Encyclopedia	Fables Encyclopedia	2013	Biographies and background information for characters from the Fables series	256	October 29, 2013	978-1401243951
The Filth			2002–2003	The Filth #1–13	352	April 21, 2015	978-1401255459
The Flash	The Flash of Two Worlds	The Flash of Two Worlds	1961–1967	The Flash (vol. 2) #123, 129, 137, 151, 173	160	March 3, 2020	978-1401294595
The Flash	The Flash: Rebirth	1	2016–2017	The Flash: Rebirth #1; The Flash (vol. 5) #1–13	336	July 26, 2017	978-1401271589
The Flash	The Flash: Rebirth	2	2017	The Flash #14–27	334	April 25, 2018	978-1401278427
The Flash	The Flash: Rebirth	3	2017–2018	The Flash #28–38, Annual #1; material from DC Universe Holiday Special #1	264	September 26, 2018	978-1401281403
The Flash	The Flash: 80 Years of The Fastest Man Alive		1939–2019	Flash Comics #1, 89, 96; Showcase #4; The Flash (vol. 1) #106, 110, 123, 155, 275, 300; The Flash (vol. 2) #54, 91, 133, 182; The Flash (vol. 4) #0; DC Holiday Special 2017 "Hope for the Holidays"; The Flash Giant vol. 1 #2; previously unpublished story "The Flash: Strange Confession"	400	November 12, 2019	ISBN 978-1-4012-9813-5
The Flash/Green Lantern	Flash & Green Lantern: The Brave and the Bold	Flash & Green Lantern: The Brave and the Bold	1999–2000	Flash & Green Lantern: The Brave and the Bold #1–6	184	April 3, 2019	978-1401288136
Flex Mentallo	Flex Mentallo: Man of Muscle Mystery	Flex Mentallo: Man of Muscle Mystery	1996	Flex Mentallo #1–4	128	January 10, 2013	978-2365771795
The Flintstones			2016–2017	The Flintstones #1–12; Booster Gold/The Flintstones Special #1	368	February 8, 2022	978-1779514974
Gen^{13}	Gen^{13}: Starting Over		1994–1995	Gen13 #1–5, 1/2; Gen13 (vol. 2) #0–5; pages from Wildstorm Universe Sourcebook #1	336	January 25, 2022	978-1779509420
Global Frequency			2002–2004	Global Frequency #1–12	320	April 4, 2018	978-1401278205
The Green Arrow	Green Arrow: The Archer's Quest	Green Arrow: The Archer's Quest	2002–2003	Green Arrow (vol. 3) #16–21	176	August 12, 2015	978-1401255251
The Green Arrow	Green Arrow: Year One	Green Arrow: Year One	2007	Green Arrow: Year One #1–6	168	May 5, 2020	978-1779501141
The Green Arrow	Green Arrow by Jeff Lemire & Andrea Sorrentino	Green Arrow by Jeff Lemire & Andrea Sorrentino	2013–2014	Green Arrow (vol. 5) #17–34, 23.1; Secret Origins (vol. 3) #4; Green Arrow: Futures End #1	464	December 30, 2015	978-1401257613
The Green Arrow	Green Arrow: Rebirth	1	2016–2017	Green Arrow: Rebirth #1; Green Arrow (vol. 6) #1–12	304	October 17, 2018	978-1401284701
The Green Arrow	Green Arrow: 80 Years of the Emerald Archer		1941–2021	Iconic stories selected from eight decades of the Emerald Archer, including newly restored versions of "The Rainbow Archer" and "The Green Arrow's Mystery Pupil" from issues of Adventure Comics.	416	March 30, 2021	978-1779509147
Green Lantern	Green Lantern: Rebirth	Green Lantern: Rebirth	2004–2005	Green Lantern: Rebirth #1–6	224	December 11, 2019	978-1401295271
Green Lantern	Green Lantern: 80 Years of the Emerald Knight		1940–2020	Iconic stories selected from eight decades of the Emerald Knight, including classic appearances of all the Earth Green Lanterns, and the never-before reprinted "Origin of Vandal Savage".	408	July 14, 2020	978-1779502797
Green Lantern/Green Arrow	Hard Traveling Heroes	Hard Traveling Heroes	1970–1972	Green Lantern (vol. 2) #76–87, 89; material from The Flash #217–219, 226	368	June 6, 2018	978-1401280420
Harley Quinn	Harley Quinn by Karl Kesel and Terry Dodson	1	2000–2001	Harley Quinn #1–8	288	September 6, 2017	978-1401276423
Harley Quinn	Harley Quinn by Karl Kesel and Terry Dodson	2	2001–2002	Harley Quinn #9–19	288	November 21, 2018	978-1401285098
Harley Quinn	Harley Quinn: Rebirth	1	2016–2017	Harley Quinn (vol. 3) #1–13	304	September 19, 2017	978-1401273682
Harley Quinn	Harley Quinn: Rebirth	2	2017	Harley Quinn (vol. 3) #14–27; Harley Quinn 25th Anniversary Special #1	384	July 4, 2018	978-1401280659
Harley Quinn	Harley Quinn: Rebirth	3	2017–2018	Harley Quinn (vol. 3) #28–42	352	January 9, 2019	978-1401285531
Harley Quinn	Harley Quinn: 30 Years of the Maid of Mischief		1992–2022	The Batman Adventures #12; Detective Comics #831; The Batman and Robin Adventures #18; Batman: Gotham Adventures #10; Batman: Gotham Knights #14; Harley Quinn #3; Gotham City Sirens #20–21; Harley Quinn Holiday Special #1; Harley Quinn: Be Careful What You Wish For Special Edition #1; Harley Quinn 25th Anniversary Special #1; Harley Quinn: Make 'Em Laugh #3; Harley Quinn Black + White + Red #14; Harley Quinn 30th Anniversary Special #1	336	September 13, 2022	978-1779517180
Harley Quinn/Poison Ivy	Batman: Harley and Ivy	Batman: Harley and Ivy	1994–2014	Batman: Harley and Ivy #1–3; Batman Adventures Holiday Special #1; Batman: Gotham Knights #14; Batman and Robin Adventures #8; Batman Adventures Annual #1; Batgirl Adventures #1; Batman Black and White (vol. 3) #3	176	February 10, 2016	978-1401260804
Injustice: Gods Among Us		1	2013–2014	Injustice: Gods Among Us #1–12, Annual #1	456	September 19, 2018	978-1401284343
Injustice: Gods Among Us		2	2014	Injustice: Gods Among Us: Year Two #1–12, Annual #1	376	September 25, 2019	978-1401294106
The Invisibles		1	1994–1995	The Invisibles #1–12; "Hexy" from Absolute Vertigo #1	328	February 18, 2014	978-1401245023
The Invisibles		2	1995–1996	The Invisibles #13–25; "And We're All Police Men" from Vertigo: Winter's Edge #1	352	August 19, 2014	978-1401245993
The Invisibles		3	1997–1998	The Invisibles (vol. 2) #1–13	336	February 10, 2015	978-1401249519
The Invisibles		4	1998–2000	The Invisibles (vol. 2) #14–22; The Invisibles (vol. 3) #12–1	512	December 4, 2018	978-1401285197
Joe the Barbarian			2010–2011	Joe the Barbarian #1–8	224	November 8, 2011	978-1401229719
The Joker	Joker	Joker	2008	Joker (graphic novel)	152	June 16, 2020	978-1401294281
The Joker	The Joker: 80 Years of the Clown Prince of Crime		1940–2020	Batman #1, 159, 251, 321, 429, 614, Detective Comics #168, 475–476, 826, Batman: The Killing Joke, Batman Adventures: Mad Love, Batman: Legends of the Dark Knight #50, Gotham Central #15, Detective Comics (vol. 2) #1 (2011) and Batman (vol. 2) #17 (2013)	448	May 19, 2020	978-1401299934
Jonah Hex	Weird Western Tales: Jonah Hex	Weird Western Tales: Jonah Hex	1972–1977	All-Star Western #10–11; Weird Western Tales #12–14 and 16-38	528	April 7, 2020	978-1779503770
Justice			2005–2007	Justice #1–12	496	August 7, 2019	978-1401293437
The Justice League of America	JLA: A Midsummer's Nightmare	JLA: A Midsummer's Nightmare	1996	Justice League: A Midsummer's Nightmare #1–3	128	October 25, 2017	978-1401274320
The Justice League of America	JLA	1	1997	JLA #1–9; JLA Secret Files and Origins	256	August 27, 2008	978-1401218430
The Justice League of America	JLA	2	1997–1998	JLA #10–17; JLA/WildC.A.T.S.; New Year's Evil: Prometheus	320	June 24, 2009	978-1401222659
The Justice League of America	JLA	3	1998–1999	JLA #22–26, 28–31, 1,000,000	344	April 28, 2010	978-1401226596
The Justice League of America	JLA	4	1999–2000	JLA #34, 36–41; JLA Classified #1–3; JLA: Earth-2	368	November 10, 2010	978-1401229092
The Justice League of America	JLA: Tower of Babel	JLA: Tower of Babel	1998–2000	JLA #18–21, 32–33, 43–46; two stories from JLA Secret Files #3	280	April 27, 2021	978-1779509512
The Justice League of America	JLA: Year One	JLA: Year One	1998	JLA: Year One #1–12	336	May 24, 2017	978-1401270865
The Justice League of America	Justice League: The Nail	Justice League: The Nail	1998–2004	Justice League: The Nail #1–3; Justice League: Another Nail #1–3	334	October 18, 2017	978-1401269050
The Justice League of America	JLA: Earth-2		2000	JLA: Earth-2	144	October 2, 2013	978-1401244101
The Justice League of America	Justice League of America by Brad Meltzer	Justice League of America by Brad Meltzer	2006–2007	Justice League of America (Vol. 2) #0–12; Justice Society of America #6–7	470	July 7, 2020	978-1779502452
The Justice League of America	Justice League: Origin	Justice League: Origin	2011–2012	Justice League (vol. 2) #1–12	360	March 31, 2020	978-1401299392
The Justice League of America	Justice League of America: Rebirth	1	2016–2017	Justice League of America: Rebirth #1; Justice League of America #1–7; Justice League of America: The Atom – Rebirth #1; Justice League of America: Vixen – Rebirth #1; Justice League of America: The Ray – Rebirth #1; Justice League of America: Killer Frost – Rebirth #1	296	November 15, 2017	978-1401276928
The Justice League of America	Justice League: Rebirth	1	2016–2017	Justice League: Rebirth #1: Justice League (vol. 3) #1–11	312	July 12, 2017	978-1401271138
The Justice League of America	Justice League: Rebirth	2	2017	Justice League (vol. 3) #12–25	344	April 11, 2018	978-1401278281
The Justice League of America	Justice League: Rebirth	3	2017–2018	Justice League (vol. 3) #26–33	200	November 7, 2018	978-1401284367
The Justice League of America	Justice League by Christopher Priest	Justice League by Christopher Priest	2018	Justice League (vol. 3) #34–43	248	April 9, 2019	978-1401288761
The Justice League of America	Justice League by Scott Snyder	1	2018–2019	Justice League (vol. 4) #1–13; Justice League/Aquaman: Drowned Earth #1; Aquaman/Justice League: Drowned Earth #1	176	December 4, 2019	978-1401295219
The Justice League of America	Justice League by Scott Snyder	2	2019	Justice League (vol. 4) #14–25	344	December 1, 2020	978-1779505842
The Justice League of America	Justice League by Scott Snyder	3	2019–2020	Justice League (vol. 4) #26–39	336	February 8, 2022	978-1779514936
The Justice Society of America	JSA: The Golden Age	JSA: The Golden Age	1993–1994	The Golden Age #1–4	200	March 15, 2017	978-1401267360
Kid Eternity			1991	Kid Eternity (vol. 2) #1–3	176	December 15, 2015	978-1401258115
Kill Your Boyfriend/Vimanarama			1995–2005	Kill Your Boyfriend; Vimanarama #1–3	168	March 1, 2016	978-1401261429
Kingdom Come	Kingdom Come: The 20th Anniversary		1996	Kingdom Come #1–4	344	May 11, 2016	978-1401260828
Legion of Super-Heroes	The Great Darkness Saga	The Great Darkness Saga	1982–1983	Legion of Super-Heroes (vol. 2) #284–296, Annual #1	414	October 17, 2010	978-1401229610
Legion of Super-Heroes	The Curse	The Curse	1983–1984	Legion of Super-Heroes (vol. 2) #297–313, Annual #2–3	544	October 19, 2011	978-1401230982
The Manhunter	Manhunter by Archie Goodwin and Walter Simonson	Manhunter by Archie Goodwin and Walter Simonson	1973–1999	Detective Comics #437–443; Manhunter: The Special Edition (1999)	112	February 2, 2021	978-1779507518
Marshal Law			1987-1993	Marshal Law #1-6, Marshal Law: Fear and Loathing, Marshal Law Takes Manhattan, Marshal Law: Kingdom of the Blind, Marshal Law: The Hateful Dead, Marshal Law: Super Babylon and Marshal Law: Secret Tribunal #1–2	480	April 23, 2013	978-1401238551
Mister Miracle			2017–2019	Mister Miracle #1–12	376	October 6, 2020	978-1779505576
Multiversity			2014–2015	Multiversity #1–9	448	October 27, 2015	978-1401256821
Neil Gaiman	Neil Gaiman's Midnight Days	Neil Gaiman's Midnight Days	1989–1995	Swamp Thing Annual #5; Hellblazer #27; Sandman Midnight Theatre	176	June 17, 2012	978-1401234577
Neil Gaiman	The DC Universe by Neil Gaiman	The DC Universe by Neil Gaiman	1989–2000	Secret Origins (vol. 2) #36, Special #1; Wednesday Comics #1–12; Batman #686; Detective Comics #853; Green Lantern/Superman: Legend of the Green Flame #1	224	October 12, 2016	978-1401264888
The New 52	DC Comics: The New 52 - 10th Anniversary		2011	All Star Western #1, Animal Man #1, Aquaman #1, Justice League Dark #1, Demon Knights #1, Voodoo #1, Justice League #1, Wonder Woman #1, Action Comics #1, Batman #1, and The Flash #1	400	August 10, 2021	978-1779510310
The Nice House on the Lake			2022	The Nice House on the Lake #1–12	400	October 17, 2023	978-1779521576
Nightwing	Nightwing: Year One	Nightwing: Year One	2005	Nightwing #101–106	160	June 30, 2020	978-1779502575
Nightwing	Nightwing: Rebirth	1	2016–2017	Nightwing: Rebirth #1; Nightwing (vol. 4) #1–15	384	October 31, 2017	978-1401273750
Nightwing	Nightwing: Rebirth	2	2017	Nightwing (vol. 4) #16–29	312	May 22, 2018	978-1401278922
Nightwing	Nightwing: Rebirth	3	2017–2018	Nightwing (vol. 4) #29–43	352	January 29, 2019	978-1401285678
Ocean/Orbiter			2003–2005	Ocean #1–6; Orbiter (graphic novel)	264	March 24, 2015	978-1401255343
The Omega Men	Omega Men by Tom King	Omega Men by Tom King	2015–2016	Omega Men 1–12	304	March 31, 2020	978-1401299927
Plastic Man	Plastic Man: Rubber Banded	Plastic Man: Rubber Banded	2004–2006	Plastic Man #1–20	480	November 3, 2020	978-1779504845
Pride of Baghdad			2006	Pride of Baghdad (graphic novel)	168	December 9, 2014	978-1401248949
Promethea	Promethea: The 20th Anniversary Deluxe Edition	1	1999–2001	Promethea #1–12	384	March 12, 2019	978-1401288662
Promethea	Promethea: The 20th Anniversary Deluxe Edition	2	2001–2003	Promethea #13–24	328	March 31, 2019	978-1401295455
Promethea	Promethea: The 20th Anniversary Deluxe Edition	3	2003–2005	Promethea #24–32	328	December 22, 2020	978-1779502261
Punk Rock Jesus			2012–2013	Punk Rock Jesus #1–6	360	December 2, 2014	978-1401251468
Robin	Robin: Year One	Robin: Year One	2000–2001	Robin: Year One #1–4	216	February 27, 2018	978-1401277642
Robin	Robin: 80 Years of the Boy Wonder		1940–2020	Batman #368, 410, 411, 466; Detective Comics #38, 394–395, 535, 796; Robin (vol. 4) #25-26; Batman Chronicles: The Gauntlet #1; World's Finest Comics #141; Star Spangled Comics #65, 124; Teen Titans #14; Batman and Robin #0; Batman Incorporated #1; Super Sons #5	416	September 15, 2020	978-1779507211
The Sandman	The Sandman	1	1989–1995	The Sandman #1–16; Sandman Midnight Theatre #1	528	November 3, 2020	978-1401299323
The Sandman	The Sandman	2	1990–1991	The Sandman #17–31	496	March 16, 2021	978-1779508119
The Sandman	The Sandman	3	1991–1993	The Sandman #32–50	560	August 3, 2021	978-1779510273
The Sandman	The Sandman	4	1993–1995	The Sandman #51–69	528	November 23, 2021	978-1779513281
The Sandman	The Sandman	5	1995–2019	The Sandman #70–75, The Sandman: The Dream Hunters #1–4, Sandman: Endless Nights (New Edition), Sandman: Dream Hunters 30th Anniversary Edition (Prose Version), and Dust Covers: The Collected Sandman Covers	632	February 1, 2022	978-1779514929
The Sandman	The Sandman: Overture	The Sandman: Overture	2013–2015	The Sandman: Overture #1–6	224	November 10, 2015	978-1401248963
Scalped		1	2007–2008	Scalped #1–11	296	February 24, 2015	978-1401250911
Scalped		2	2008–2009	Scalped #12–24	320	September 1, 2015	978-1401254254
Scalped		3	2009–2010	Scalped #25–34	256	December 29, 2015	978-1401258580
Scalped		4	2010–2011	Scalped #35–49	352	May 10, 2016	978-1401261443
Scalped		5	2011–2012	Scalped #50–60	256	September 6, 2016	978-1401263638
Shazam!	The New Beginning 30th Anniversary		1987	Shazam!: The New Beginning #1–4; material from Action Comics #623–626	128	December 12, 2017	978-1401274849
Shazam!	Shazam!: The Monster Society of Evil	Shazam!: The Monster Society of Evil	2007	Shazam!: The Monster Society of Evil #1–4	240	October 17, 2007	978-1401214661
Shazam!	Shazam!	Shazam!	2011	Justice League #0, 8–11, 14–16, 18–21	208	October 27, 2020	978-1779506849
The Sheriff of Babylon			2015–2017	The Sheriff of Babylon #1–12	304	March 20, 2018	978-1401277918
Solo			2004–2006	Solo #1–12	608	June 11, 2013	978-1401277918
Spaceman			2011	Spaceman #1–9	224	November 13, 2012	978-1401235529
Strange Adventures			2020-2021	Strange Adventures #1-12	400	January 2, 2024	978-1779523082
The Suicide Squad	Suicide Squad: Rebirth	1	2016–2017	Suicide Squad (vol. 5) #1–8; Suicide Squad: Rebirth; Harley Quinn and the Suicide Squad April Fools' Special	291	October 24, 2017	978-1401274214
The Suicide Squad	Suicide Squad: Rebirth	2	2017	Suicide Squad (vol. 5) #9–20; Suicide Squad Special: War Crimes	317	May 8, 2018	978-1401278915
The Suicide Squad	Suicide Squad: Rebirth	3	2017–2018	Suicide Squad (vol. 5) #21–32	290	November 27, 2018	978-1401285166
Supergirl	Supergirl: Woman of Tomorrow	Supergirl: Woman of Tomorrow	2021	Supergirl: Woman of Tomorrow #1–8	256	July 23, 2024	978-1779526076
Superman	Superman vs. Muhammad Ali	Superman vs. Muhammad Ali	1978	All-New Collector's Edition C-56	96	November 16, 2010	978-1401228415
Superman	Whatever Happened to the Man of Tomorrow?	Whatever Happened to the Man of Tomorrow?	1986	Superman #423; Action Comics #583, Annual #11; DC Comics Presents #84	128	July 14, 2009	978-1401223472
Superman	Whatever Happened to the Man of Tomorrow?	Whatever Happened to the Man of Tomorrow?	1986	Superman #423; Action Comics #583, Annual #11; DC Comics Presents #84	128	December 22, 2020	978-1779504890
Superman	Death of Superman 30th Anniversary Edition		1992–1993	Action Comics #683–684, Adventures of Superman #496–498, Superman (vol. 2) #73–75, Superman: The Man Of Steel #17–19 and Newstime: The Life and Death of Superman	224	December 6, 2022	978-1779516978
Superman	Superman & Lois Lane: The 25th Wedding Anniversary		1996	Superman (vol. 2) #118; Adventures of Superman #541; Action Comics #728; Superman: The Man of Steel #63; Superman: The Wedding Album #1	208	September 21, 2021	978-1779510334
Superman	Superman for All Seasons	Superman for All Seasons	1998	Superman for All Seasons #1–4	224	December 16, 2014	978-1401250782
Superman	Red Son	Red Son	2003	Superman: Red Son #1–3	168	October 17, 2009	978-1401224257
Superman	Superman: Birthright	Superman: Birthright	2003–2004	Superman: Birthright #1–12	304	December 13, 2022	978-1779517432
Superman	Secret Identity	Secret Identity	2004	Superman: Secret Identity #1–4	224	February 2, 2016	978-1401258696
Superman	Superman for Tomorrow 15th Anniversary		2004–2005	Superman (vol. 2) #204–215	344	December 10, 2019	978-1401295158
Superman	All Star Superman	All Star Superman	2005–2008	All-Star Superman 1–12; Absolute All-Star Superman	328	January 25, 2022	978-1779513441
Superman	Superman: The Last Son	Superman: The Last Son	2006–2008	Action Comics #844–846, 851, 855–857, Annual #10–11	288	March 9, 2021	978-1779509116
Superman	Superman: Camelot Falls	Superman: Camelot Falls	2006-2008	Superman #654-658, 662–664, 667, Annual #13	288	June 13, 2023	978-1779524096
Superman	Superman: Kryptonite	Superman: Kryptonite	2007–2008	Superman Confidential #1–5, 11	160	January 8, 2019	978-1401275259
Superman	Superman: Secret Origin	Superman: Secret Origin	2009–2010	Superman: Secret Origin #1–6	240	December 21, 2010	978-1401226978
Superman	Superman: Unchained	Superman: Unchained	2013–2015	Superman Unchained #1–9; material from Superman Unchained Director's Cut #1	352	December 16, 2014	978-1401245221
Superman	Superman Action Comics: Rebirth	1	2016	Action Comics #957–966; Justice League (vol. 2) #52	264	July 4, 2017	978-1401273569
Superman	Superman Action Comics: Rebirth	2	2017	Action Comics #967–984	440	February 20, 2018	978-1401277604
Superman	Superman Action Comics: Rebirth	3	2017–2018	Action Comics #985–999, Special #1	400	December 4, 2018	978-1401280437
Superman	Superman: Rebirth	1	2016–2017	Superman: Rebirth #1; Superman (vol. 4) #1–13	336	October 3, 2017	978-1401271558
Superman	Superman: Rebirth	2	2017	Superman (vol. 4) #14–26; Annual #1	360	May 29, 2018	978-1401278663
Superman	Superman: Rebirth	3	2017–2018	Superman (vol. 4) #27–36	240	January 8, 2019	978-1401284510
Superman	Superman: Rebirth	4	2018	Superman (vol. 4) #37–45, Special #1; material from Action Comics #1000	280	May 21, 2019	978-1401289355
Superman	Superman: The Oz Effect	Superman: The Oz Effect	2017	Action Comics #985–992	192	March 27, 2018	978-1401277383
Superman	Action Comics #1000		2018	Action Comics #1, 1000	160	September 26, 2018	978-1401285975
Superman	Man and Superman	Man and Superman	2019	Man and Superman 100-Page Super Spectacular #1	144	December 4, 2019	978-1401298937
Superman	Action Comics: 80 Years of Superman		1938–2018	Action Comics #0–2, 42, 64, 241–242, 252, 262, 309, 419, 484, 554, 584, 655, 662, 800	384	April 11, 2018	978-1401278878
Superman/Batman	Superman/Batman: World's Finest	Superman/Batman: World's Finest	1992	World's Finest (vol. 2) #1–3	176	July 1, 2008	978-1401218096
Superman/Shazam!	Superman/Shazam! First Thunder	Superman/Shazam! First Thunder	2005–2006	Superman/Shazam!: First Thunder #1–4	144	December 18, 2018	978-1401285371
The Swamp Thing	Swamp Thing by Scott Snyder	Swamp Thing by Scott Snyder	2012–2013	Swamp Thing #0–18, Annual #1; Animal Man #12, 17	512	September 22, 2015	978-1401258702
The Swamp Thing	Swamp Thing by Len Wein and Kelley Jones	Swamp Thing by Len Wein and Kelley Jones	2016	Swamp Thing #94 and #100, Batman #521-522, Convergence: Swamp Thing #1-2, Swamp Thing (2016) #1-6, and Swamp Thing Winter Special #1	432	October 21, 2025	978-1799502982
The Swamp Thing	Swamp Thing: Roots of Terror	Swamp Thing: Roots of Terror	2018	Swamp Thing Winter Special #1; stories from Swamp Thing Halloween Horror Giant #1, Young Monsters in Love #1 and Cursed Comics Cavalcade #1	168	July 16, 2019	978-1401295875
Sweet Tooth		1	2009–2010	Sweet Tooth #1–12	296	September 8, 2015	978-1401258719
Sweet Tooth		2	2010–2011	Sweet Tooth #13–25	304	April 12, 2016	978-1401261467
Sweet Tooth		3	2011–2013	Sweet Tooth #26–40	368	November 29, 2016	978-1401267391
Teen Titans	The New Teen Titans: The Judas Contract	The New Teen Titans: The Judas Contract	1984	The New Teen Titans #39-40, Tales of the Teen Titans #41-44, Annual #3	200	February 6, 2018	978-1401275778
Trillium			2013–2014	Trilllium #1–8	208	November 14, 2017	978-1401274528
Uncle Sam			1997	U.S. #1–2	128	October 27, 2009	978-1401223489
The Unwritten		1	2009–2010	The Unwritten #1–12	200	December 20, 2016	978-1401265434
V for Vendetta	V for Vendetta 30th Anniversary		1988–1989	V for Vendetta #1–10	400	November 20, 2018	978-1401285005
Watchmen			1986–1987	Watchmen #1–12	448	June 4, 2013	978-1401238964
We3			2004–2005	We3 #1–3	144	August 23, 2011	978-1401230678
Wonder Woman	Wonder Woman: The Hiketeia	Wonder Woman: The Hiketeia	2002	Wonder Woman: The Hiketeia (graphic novel)	128	August 18, 2020	978-1779502162
Wonder Woman	Wonder Woman: Who Is Wonder Woman?	Wonder Woman: Who Is Wonder Woman?	2006–2007	Wonder Woman (vol. 3) #1–4, Annual (vol. 3) #1	160	April 4, 2023	978-1779521675
Wonder Woman	Wonder Woman: Blood and Guts	Wonder Woman: Blood and Guts	2011		304	October 10, 2023	978-1779523167
Wonder Woman	Wonder Woman: Rebirth	1	2016–2017	Wonder Woman: Rebirth #1; Wonder Woman (vol. 5) #1–14	360	October 10, 2017	978-1401276782
Wonder Woman	Wonder Woman: Rebirth	2	2017	Wonder Woman (vol. 5) #15–25, Annual #1; DC Holiday Special 2017	288	July 17, 2018	978-1401280932
Wonder Woman	Wonder Woman: Rebirth	3	2017	Wonder Woman (vol. 5) #26–30, Annual #1; Wonder Woman: Steve Trevor Special #1; Wonder Woman 75th Anniversary Special #1	249	February 26, 2019	978-1401285722
Wonder Woman	Wonder Woman: Year One	Wonder Woman: Year One	2016–2017	Wonder Woman (vol. 5) #2, 4, 6, 8, 10, 12, 14; material from Annual #1	192	August 27, 2019	978-1401292652
Wonder Woman	Wonder Woman #750		2020	Wonder Woman #750	176	August 11, 2020	978-1779503978
Wonder Woman	Wonder Woman: 80 Years of the Amazon Warrior		1941–2021	Starting from the first appearance of Wonder Woman through some of her most incredible battles against foes like the Cheetah and Ares.	416	September 14, 2021	978-1779511577
Y: The Last Man		1	2002–2003	Y: The Last Man #1–10	256	October 28, 2008	978-1401219215
Y: The Last Man		2	2003–2004	Y: The Last Man #11–23	320	May 12, 2009	978-1401222352
Y: The Last Man		3	2004–2005	Y: The Last Man #24–36	320	April 27, 2010	978-1401225780
Y: The Last Man		4	2005–2006	Y: The Last Man #37–48	296	October 26, 2010	978-1401228880
Y: The Last Man		5	2006–2008	Y: The Last Man #49–60	320	May 3, 2011	978-1401230517

== General collections ==
=== 0–9 ===
Title	Vol. #	Subtitle	Material collected	Publication date	ISBN	Notes
52	1		52 #1–13	May 2007	978-1401213534	
52	2		52 #14–26	July 2007	978-1401213640	
52	3		52 #27–39	September 2007	978-1401214432	
52	4		52 #40–52	November 2007	978-1401214869	
52 Aftermath		The Four Horsemen	52 Aftermath: The Four Horsemen #1–6	May 2008	978-1401217815	

=== A ===
Title	Vol. #	Subtitle	Material collected	Publication date	ISBN	Notes
Action Comics		Wrath of Gog	Action Comics #812–819	June 2005	978-1401204501	
Action Comics		In the Name of Gog	Action Comics #820–825	December 2005	978-1401207571	
Action Comics		Strange Attractors	Action Comics #827–828, #830–835	May 2006	978-1401209179	
Action Comics		Superman: Last Son	Action Comics #844–846, #851, Annual #11	July 2008; June 2009	HC: 978-1401213435; TP: 978-1401215866	
Action Comics		Superman and the Legion of Super-Heroes	Action Comics #858–863	July 2008; July 2009	HC: 978-1401218195; TP: 978-1401219048	
Action Comics		Superman: Brainiac	Action Comics #866–870	March 2009; March 2010	HC: 978-1401220877; TP: 978-1401220884	
Action Comics		Superman: Nightwing and Flamebird, Vol. 1	Action Comics #875–879, Annual #12; Superman Secret Files and Origins 2009	March 2010	HC: 978-1401226381	
Action Comics		Superman: Nightwing and Flamebird, Vol. 2	Action Comics #883–889; Adventure Comics #8–10; Superman #696	October 2010	HC: 978-1401229399	
Action Comics		Superman: The Black Ring, Vol. 1	Action Comics #890–895	February 2012	TP: 978-1401230340	
Action Comics		Superman: The Black Ring, Vol. 2	Action Comics 896–900; Secret Six #29, Annual #13	September 2012	TP: 978-1401234447	
Action Comics		Superman: Reign of Doomsday	Action Comics #900–904	February 2012; March 2013	HC: 978-1401233457; TP: 978-1401236885	
Action Comics	1	Superman and the Men of Steel	Action Comics (vol. 2) #1–8	August 7, 2012 May 7, 2013	HC :978-1401235468 TP: 978-1401235475	
Action Comics	2	Bulletproof	Action Comics #0, #9–12, Annual #1	May 7, 2013 December 17, 2013	HC: 978-1401241018 TP: 978-1401242541	
Action Comics	3	At the End of Days	Action Comics #13–18	December 17, 2013July 29, 2014	HC: 978-1401242329 TP: 978-1401246068	
Action Comics	4	Hybrid	Action Comics #19–24; Superman (vol. 3) Annual #2; Young Romance: The New 52 Valentine's Day Special #1	July 29, 2014 December 30, 2014	HC: 978-1401246327 TP: 978-1401250775	
Action Comics	5	What Lies Beneath	Action Comics #25–29; Secret Origins (vol. 3) #1	December 30, 2014 June 16, 2015	HC: 978-1401249472 TP: 978-1401254889	
Action Comics	6	Superdoom	Action Comics #30–35, Annual #3	June 16, 2015 December 29, 2015	HC: 978-1401254896 TP: 978-1401258658	
Action Comics	7	Under the Skin	Action Comics #36–40; Action Comics: Futures End #1	December 29, 2015 July 26, 2016	HC: 978-1401258665 TP: 978-1401262624	
Action Comics	8	Truth	Action Comics #41–47; DC Sneak Peek: Action Comics #1	July 29, 2016 December 27, 2016	HC: 978-1401262631 TP: 978-1401269203	
Action Comics	9	Last Rites	Action Comics #48–52	December 27, 2016 June 13, 2017	HC: 978-1401269197 TP: 978-1401274108	
Adam Strange		The Silver Age	Showcase #17–19; Mystery in Space #53–79	January 2019	TP: 978-1401285791	
Adam Strange		The Man of Two Worlds	Adam Strange #1–3	March 2003	978-1401200657	
Adam Strange		Planet Heist	Adam Strange (vol. 2) #1–8	September 2005	978-1401207274	
The All-New Atom	1	My Life in Miniature	The All New Atom #1–6; DCU: Brave New World	May 2007	978-1401213251	
The All-New Atom	2	Future/Past	The All New Atom #7–11	December 2007	978-1401215682	
The All-New Atom	3	The Hunt for Ray Palmer	The All New Atom #12–16	June 2008	978-1401217822	
The All-New Atom	4	Small Wonder	The All New Atom #17–18, #21–25	December 2008	978-1401219963	
Aquaman		The Waterbearer	Aquaman (vol. 6) #1–4; Aquaman Secret Files and Origins 2003	December 2003	978-1401200886	
Aquaman		Once and Future	Aquaman: Sword of Atlantis #40–45	December 2006	978-1401211455	
Aquaman		Time and Tide	Aquaman: Time and Tide #1–4	February 1996	978-1563892592	
Arkham Asylum		Living Hell	Arkham Asylum: Living Hell #1–6	March 2004	978-1401201937	
Atomic Knights		The Atomic Knights	Strange Adventures #117, #120, #123, #126, #129, #132, #135, #138, #141, #144, #147, #150, #153, #156, #160	2010	HC: 978-1401227487	

=== B ===
Title	Vol. #	Subtitle	Material collected	Publication date	ISBN	Notes
Batgirl		The Greatest Stories Ever Told	Detective Comics #359, 396–397, 422–424; The Batman Chronicles #9; Batman Family #1, 9; Legends of the DC Universe #10–11	December 2010	978-1401229245	
Batman		Secrets of the Batcave	Material from Batman #12, 35, 48, 109, 348; Detective Comics #158, 186, 205, 223, 235, 244; World's Finest Comics #30; The Brave and the Bold #182; Bizarro Comics #244; Secret Origins (TPB)	August 2007	978-1401213701	
Batman		The Black Casebook	Batman #65, 81, 112–113, 134, 156, 152; Detective Comics #215, 235, 247, 267; World's Finest #89	June 2009	978-1401222642	
Batman		vs. Two-Face	Batman #81, 234, 527–528, 653; Detective Comics #66, 68, 80, 187; Batman: Black and White #1; the origin story from Countdown #27	May 2008	978-1401217839	
Batman		Year One	Batman #404–407	January 2007	978-1401207526	
Batman		Ten Nights of the Beast	Batman #417–420	October 1994	978-1563891557	
Batman		A Death in the Family	Batman #426–429	December 1995	978-0930289447	
Batman		The Many Deaths of the Batman	Batman #433–435	1992	978-1563890338	
Batman		False Faces	Batman #588–590; Detective Comics #787; Wonder Woman #160–161; a story from Batman: Gotham City Secret Files and Origins	February 2008; January 2009	HC: 978-1401216405; TP: 978-1401222284	
Batman		Hush Vol. 1	Batman #608–612	May 2003; August 2004	HC: 978-1401200619; TP: 978-1401200602	
Batman		Hush Vol. 2	Batman #613–619	January 2004; November 2004	HC: 978-1401200848; TP: 978-1401200923	
Batman		Hush: Completed Edition	Batman #608–619	August 2009	978-1401223175	
Batman		Broken City	Batman #620–625	July 2004; July 2005	HC: 978-1401201333; TP: 978-1401202149	
Batman		As the Crow Flies	Batman #626–630	November 2004	978-1401203443	
Batman		Under the Hood Vol. 1	Batman #635–641	November 2005	978-1401207564	
Batman		Under the Hood Vol. 2	Batman #645–650	June 2006	978-1401209018	
Batman		Batman and Son	Batman #655–658; 663–666	August 2007; July 2008	HC: 978-1401212407; TP: 978-1401212414	
Batman		The Black Glove	Batman #667–669, 672–675	September 2008; September 2009	HC: 978-1401219093; TP: 978-1401219451	
Batman		The Resurrection of Ra's al Ghul	Batman #670–671, Annual #26; Robin (vol. 4) #168–169, Annual #7; Nightwing #138–139; Detective Comics #838–839	May 2008; May 2009	HC: 978-1401217853; TP: 978-1401220327	
Batman		R.I.P.	Batman #676–683; DC Universe #0	February 2009; June 2010	HC: 978-1401220907; TP: 978-1401225766	
Batman		Whatever Happened to the Caped Crusader?	Batman #686; Detective Comics #853; material from Secret Origins (vol. 2) #36, Special #1; Batman: Black and White #2	July 2009; August 2010	HC: 978-1401223038; TP: 978-1401227241	
Batman		Long Shadows	Batman #687–691	July 2010; May 2011	HC: 978-1401227197; TP: 978-1401227203	
Batman		Life After Death	Batman #692–699	October 2010	HC: 978-1401228347	
Batman		Time and the Batman	Batman #700–703	March 2011; February 2012	HC:978-1401229894; TP: 978-1401229900	
Batman		Battle for the Cowl	Batman: Battle for the Cowl #1–3; Gotham Gazette: Batman Dead? #1; Gotham Gazette: Batman Alive? #1	November 2009	978-1401224172	
Batman		Battle for the Cowl Companion	Battle for the Cowl: Arkham Asylum; Battle for the Cowl: The Network; Battle for the Cowl: Man-Bat; Battle for the Cowl: Underground; Battle for the Cowl: Commissioner Gordon	November 2009	978-1401224950	
Batman	1	The Court of Owls	Batman (vol. 3) #1–7	May 15, 2012 March 26, 2013	HC: 978-1401235413 TP: 978-1401235420	
Batman	2	The City of Owls	Batman #8–12, Annual #1	March 26, 2013 October 13, 2013	HC: 978-1401237776 TP: 978-9351116615	
Batman	3	Death of the Family	Batman #13–17	November 5, 2013 May 13, 2014	HC: 978-1401242343 TP: 978-1401246020	
Batman	4	Zero Year – Secret City	Batman #21–24, 21 Director's Cut	May 13, 2014 October 7, 2014	HC: 978-1401245085 TP: 978-1401249335	
Batman	5	Zero Year – Dark City	Batman #25–27, 29–33	October 7, 2014 May 5, 2015	HC: 978-1401248857 TP: 978-1401253356	
Batman	6	Graveyard Shift	Batman #0, 18–20, 28, 34, Annual #2	May 5, 2015 October 6, 2015	HC: 978-1401252304 TP: 978-1401257538	
Batman	7	Endgame	Batman #35–40	September 22, 2015 March 22, 2016	HC: 978-1401256890 TP: 978-1401261160	
Batman	8	Superheavy	Batman #41–45; DC Sneak Peek: Batman #1	March 22, 2016 September 13, 2016	HC: 978-1401259693 TP: 978-1401266301	
Batman	9	Bloom	Batman #46–50; material from Detective Comics (vol. 2) #27	September 13, 2016 December 20, 2016	HC: 978-1401264628 TP: 978-1401269227	
Batman	10	Epilogue	Batman #51–52, Annual #4; Batman: Futures End #1; Batman: Rebirth #1 preview	December 20, 2016 April 25, 2017	HC: 978-1401267735 TP: 978-1401268329	
Batman		Black and White Vol. 1	Batman: Black and White #1–4	July 1999; September 2007	HC: 978-1563893322; TP: 978-1401215897	
Batman		Black and White Vol. 2	Material from Batman: Gotham Knights #1–16	October 2003	978-1563899171	
Batman		Black and White Vol. 3	Material from Batman: Gotham Knights #17–49	May 2007; September 2008	HC: 978-1401215316; TP: 978-1401213541	
Batman		Dark Victory	Batman: Dark Victory #0–13	October 2001; October 2002	HC: 978-1563897382; TP: 978-1563898686	
Batman		Ego and Other Tails	Batman: Ego; Catwoman: Selina's Big Score; Solo #1, 5; material from Batman: Gotham Knights #23, #33	June 2007; November 2008	HC: 978-1401215293; TP: 978-1401213596	
Batman		Jekyll and Hyde	Batman: Jekyll and Hyde #1–6	June 2008	978-1401217976	
Batman		The Long Halloween	Batman: The Long Halloween #1–13	February 1999; November 1999	HC: 978-1563894275; TP: 978-1563894695	
Batman		Secrets	Batman: Secrets #1–5	January 2007	978-1401212124	
Batman		Turning Points	Batman: Turning Points #1–5	June 2007	978-1401213602	
Batman Adventures	1	Rogues Gallery	Batman Adventures #1–4; Batman: Gotham Adventures #50	June 2004	978-1401203290	
Batman Adventures	2	Shadows and Masks	Batman Adventures #5–9	July 2004	978-1401203306	
Batman and the Outsiders	1	The Chrysalis	Batman and the Outsiders (vol. 2) #1–5	October 2008	978-1401219314	
Batman and the Outsiders	2	The Snare	Batman and the Outsiders (vol. 2) #6–10	February 2009	978-1401221997	
Batman Confidential	1	Rules of Engagement	Batman Confidential #1–6	November 2007; December 2008	HC: 978-1401214814; TP: 978-1401217068	
Batman Confidential	2	Lovers and Madmen	Batman Confidential #7–12	April 2008; April 2009	HC: 978-1401216832; TP: 978-1401217426	
Batman Confidential	3	The Wrath	Batman Confidential #13–16; Batman Special #1	December 2009	978-1401225148	
Batman Confidential	4	The Cat and the Bat	Batman Confidential #17–21	December 2009	978-1401224967	
Batman Confidential	5	King Tut's Tomb	Batman Confidential #26–28; Batman #353; The Brave and the Bold #164, 171	February 2010	978-1401225773	
Batman Confidential	6	Dead to Rights	Batman Confidential #22–25, 29–30	December 2010	978-1401229252	
Batman Confidential	7	The Bat and the Beast	Batman Confidential #31–35	August 2010	978-1401227944	
Batman/Superman/Wonder Woman		Trinity	Batman/Superman/Wonder Woman: Trinity #1–3	June 2004; July 2005	HC: 978-1401203092; TP: 978-1401201876	
Birds of Prey	1		Birds of Prey: Manhunt #1–4; Birds of Prey: Revolution; Black Canary/Oracle: Birds of Prey; a story from Showcase '96 #3	February 1999	978-1563894848	
Birds of Prey	2	Old Friends, New Enemies	Birds of Prey #1–6; Birds of Prey: Batgirl; Birds of Prey: Wolves	February 2003	978-1563899393	
Birds of Prey	3	Of Like Minds	Birds of Prey #56–61	March 2004	978-1401201920	
Birds of Prey	4	Sensei and Student	Birds of Prey #62–68	February 2005	978-1401204341	
Birds of Prey	5	Between Dark and Dawn	Birds of Prey #69–75	March 2006	978-1401209407	
Birds of Prey	6	The Battle Within	Birds of Prey #76–85	October 2006	978-1401210960	
Birds of Prey	7	Perfect Pitch	Birds of Prey #86–90, 92–95	February 2007	978-1401211912	
Birds of Prey	8	Blood and Circuits	Birds of Prey #96–103	August 2007	978-1401213718	
Birds of Prey	9	Dead of Winter	Birds of Prey #104–108	February 2008	978-1401216412	
Birds of Prey	10	Metropolis or Dust	Birds of Prey #113–117	October 2008	978-1401219628	
Birds of Prey	11	Club Kids	Birds of Prey #109–112, 118	January 2009	978-1401221751	
Birds of Prey	12	Platinum Flats	Birds of Prey #119–124	July 2009	978-1401222932	
Black Adam		The Dark Age	Black Adam: The Dark Age #1–6	May 2008	978-1401217860	
Blue Beetle	1	Shellshocked	Blue Beetle #1–6	December 2006	978-1401209650	
Blue Beetle	2	Road Trip	Blue Beetle #7–12	June 2007	978-1401213619	
Blue Beetle	3	Reach for the Stars	Blue Beetle #13–19	February 2008	978-1401216429	
Blue Beetle	4	Endgame	Blue Beetle #20–26	October 2008	978-1401219529	
Blue Beetle	5	Boundaries	Blue Beetle #29–34	April 2009	978-1401221621	
Blue Beetle	6	Black and Blue	Blue Beetle #27–28, 35–36; Booster Gold (vol. 2) #21–25, 28–29	December 2010	978-1401228972	
Booster Gold	1	52 Pick-Up	Booster Gold (vol. 2) #1–6	May 2008; May 2009	HC: 978-1401217877; TP: 978-1401220068	
Booster Gold	2	Blue and Gold	Booster Gold (vol. 2) #0, 7–10, 1,000,000	November 2008; December 2009	HC: 978-1401219567; TP: 978-1401220143	
Booster Gold	3	Reality Lost	Booster Gold (vol. 2) #11–12, 15–19	August 2009	978-1401222499	
Booster Gold	4	Day of Death	Booster Gold (vol. 2) #20–25; The Brave and the Bold (vol. 3) #23	April 2010	978-1401226435	
Booster Gold	5	The Tomorrow Memory	Booster Gold (vol. 2) #26–31	December 2010	978-1401229184	
The Brave and the Bold	1	The Lords of Luck	The Brave and the Bold (vol. 3) #1–6	December 2007; December 2008	HC: 978-1401215033; TP: 978-1401215880	
The Brave and the Bold	2	The Book of Destiny	The Brave and the Bold (vol. 3) #7–12	September 2008; August 2009	HC: 978-1401218386; TP: 978-1401218614	
The Brave and the Bold	3	Demons and Dragons	The Brave and the Bold (vol. 3) #13–16; The Brave and the Bold #181; The Flash (vol. 2) #107; Impulse #17	March 2009; March 2010	HC: 978-1401221904; TP: 978-1401221911	
The Brave and the Bold	4	Without Sin	The Brave and the Bold (vol. 3) #17–22	July 2009	978-1401222864	
The Brave and the Bold		Team-Ups of the Brave and the Bold	The Brave and the Bold (vol. 3) #27–33	August 2010; August 2011	HC: 978-1401227937; TP: 978-1401228095	

=== C ===
Title	Vol. #	Subtitle	Material collected	Publication date	ISBN	Notes
Camelot 3000		Camelot 3000	Camelot 3000 #1–12	March 1988	978-0446387972	
Captain Carrot and the Final Ark			Captain Carrot and the Final Ark #1–3; Captain Carrot and His Amazing Zoo Crew! #1, 14–15; The New Teen Titans #16; Teen Titans (vol. 3) #30–31	April 2008	978-1401216849	
Catwoman		Her Sister's Keeper	Catwoman #1–4	May 1991	978-0930289973	
Catwoman		The Catfile	Catwoman (vol. 2) #15–19	April 1996	978-1563892622	
Catwoman	1	The Dark End of the Street	Catwoman (vol. 3) #1–4; Detective Comics #759–762	September 2002	978-1563899089	
Catwoman	2	Crooked Little Town	Catwoman (vol. 3) #5–10; Catwoman Secret Files and Origins	December 2003	978-1401200084	
Catwoman	3	Relentless	Catwoman (vol. 3) #12–19; Catwoman Secret Files and Origins	February 2005	978-1401202187	
Catwoman	4	Wild Ride	Catwoman (vol. 3) #20–24; Catwoman Secret Files and Origins	September 2005	978-1401204365	
Catwoman	5	The Replacements	Catwoman (vol. 3) #53–58	February 2007	978-1401212131	
Catwoman	6	It's Only A Movie	Catwoman #59–65	August 2007	978-1401213374	
Catwoman	7	Catwoman's Dies	Catwoman #66–72	February 2008	978-1401216436	
Catwoman	8	Crime Pays	Catwoman (vol. 3) #73–77	October 2008	978-1401219291	
Catwoman	9	The Long Road Home	Catwoman (vol. 3) #78–82	March 2009	978-1401221683	
Catwoman		Nine Lives of a Feline Fatale	Catwoman (vol. 2) #54; Catwoman Secret Files and Origins; Batman #1, #197, #210, #392; Batman: Gotham Adventures #4; Detective Comics #203; Superman's Girl Friend, Lois Lane #70–71	July 2004	978-1401202132	
Catwoman		When in Rome	Catwoman: When in Rome #1–6	November 2005; June 2007	HC: 978-1401204327; TP: 978-1401207175	
Challengers of the Unknown by Jack Kirby			Showcase #6–7, #11–12; Challengers of the Unknown #1–8	June 2012	978-1401234744	
Checkmate	1	A King's Game	Checkmate (vol. 2) #1–7	February 2007	978-1401212209	
Checkmate	2	Pawn Breaks	Checkmate (vol. 2) #8–12	September 2007	978-1401214456	
Checkmate	3	Fall of the Wall	Checkmate (vol. 2) #16–22	May 2008	978-1401217884	
Checkmate	4	Chimera	Checkmate (vol. 2) #26–31	March 2009	978-1401221355	
Connor Hawke		Dragon's Blood	Connor Hawke: Dragon's Blood #1–6	February 2008	978-1401216443	
Cosmic Odyssey			Cosmic Odyssey #1–4	1992; September 2009	1-56389-051-8; 978-1563890512	
Countdown	1		Countdown #51–39	May 2008	978-1401217891	Numbering runs backwards
Countdown	2		Countdown #38–26	July 2008	978-1401218249	
Countdown	3		Countdown to Final Crisis #25–13	October 2008	978-1401219116	
Countdown	4		Countdown to Final Crisis #12–1	November 2008	978-1401219123	
Countdown Presents		Lord Havok and the Extremists	Countdown Presents: Lord Havok and the Extremists #1–6	August 2008	978-1401218447	
Countdown Presents		The Search for Ray Palmer	Countdown Presents: The Search for Ray Palmer: Crime Society; Countdown Presents: The Search for Ray Palmer: Gotham by Gaslight; Countdown Presents: The Search for Ray Palmer: Red Rain; Countdown Presents: The Search for Ray Palmer: Red Son; Countdown Presents: The Search for Ray Palmer: Superwoman/Batwoman; Countdown Presents: The Search for Ray Palmer: Wildstorm; DC Infinite Halloween Special	July 2008	978-1401217983	
Countdown to Adventure			Countdown to Adventure #1–8	July 2008	978-1401218232	
Crisis Aftermath		The Battle for Blüdhaven	Crisis Aftermath: The Battle for Blüdhaven #1–6	October 2006	978-1401211998	
Crisis Aftermath		The Spectre	Crisis Aftermath: The Spectre #1–3; Tales of the Unexpected (vol. 2) #1–3	July 2007	978-1401213800	
Crisis on Infinite Earths			Crisis on Infinite Earths #1–12	1998; June 2001	HC: 978-1563894343; TP: 978-1563897504	

=== D ===
Title	Vol. #	Subtitle	Material collected	Publication date	ISBN	Notes
Day of Vengeance			Day of Vengeance #1–6; Action Comics #826; Adventures of Superman #639; Superman (vol. 2) #216	November 2005	978-1401208400	
DC Goes Ape			Superboy #76; Superman (vol. 1) #138; The Flash (vol. 1) #127; Detective Comics #339, 482; Hawkman #16; Wonder Woman (vol. 1) #170; Strange Adventures #201; Shazam! #9; Super Friends #30; Flash (vol. 2) #151	October 2008	978-1401219352	
DC's Greatest Imaginary Stories	1		Batman #127, #151; Captain Marvel Adventures #66; The Flash #128; Superman #149, #162, #166; Superman's Girl Friend, Lois Lane #19, #51; Superman's Pal Jimmy Olsen #57; World's Finest Comics #172	September 2005	978-1401205348	
DC's Greatest Imaginary Stories	2	Batman and Robin	Batman #122, #131, #135, #145, #154, #159, #163, #300; Superman's Girl Friend, Lois Lane #89; World's Finest Comics #153	May 2010	978-1401227258	
DC/Marvel: Crossover Classics	1		DC Special Series #27; Marvel and DC Present: The Uncanny X-Men and The New Teen Titans; Marvel Treasury Edition #28; Superman vs. the Amazing Spider-Man	June 1997	978-0871358585	
DC/Marvel: Crossover Classics	2		Batman/Captain America; Batman/Punisher: Lake of Fire; Punisher/Batman: Deadly Knights; Silver Surfer/Superman #1	January 1998	978-1563893995	
DC/Marvel: Crossover Classics	3		Daredevil/Batman: Eye for an Eye; Generation X/Gen13; Incredible Hulk vs. Superman; Spider-Man and Batman: Disordered Minds; Spider-Man/Gen13; Team X/Team 7	May 2002	978-0785108184	
DC/Marvel: Crossover Classics	4		Batman & Spider-Man: New Age Dawning; Darkseid vs. Galactus: The Hunger; Green Lantern/Silver Surfer: Unholy Alliances; Superman/Fantastic Four: The Infinite Destruction	October 2003	978-1401201692	
DC: The New Frontier	1		DC: The New Frontier #1–3	December 2004	978-1401203504	
DC: The New Frontier	2		DC: The New Frontier #4–6	May 2005	978-1401204617	
DC/Top Cow Crossovers			The Darkness/Superman #1–2; The Darkness/Batman; JLA/Cyberforce; JLA/Witchblade	July/August 2007	978-1401213381	
A DC Universe Christmas			Adventure Comics #82; Captain Marvel Adventures #69; Christmas with the Super-Heroes #2; DC Special Series #21; DCU Holiday Bash #1–3; House of Mystery #191; Sensation Comics #14; Teen Titans #13	December 2000	978-1563896408	
DC Universe: The Stories of Alan Moore			Action Comics #583; Batman Annual #11; Batman: The Killing Joke; DC Comics Presents #85; Detective Comics #549–550; Green Lantern (vol. 2) #188, Annual #3; The Green Lantern Corps Annual #2; The Omega Men #26–27; Secret Origins #10; Superman #423, Annual #11; Vigilante #17–18	February 2006	978-1401209278	
DC versus Marvel/Marvel versus DC			DC versus Marvel/Marvel versus DC #1–4; Doctor StrangeFate #1	September 1996	978-1563892943	
The Deadman Collection			Aquaman #50–52; The Brave and the Bold #79, #86, #104; Challengers of the Unknown #74; Strange Adventures #205–216	December 2001	HC: 978-1563898495	
Diana Prince: Wonder Woman	1		Wonder Woman #178–184	February 2008	978-1401216603	
Diana Prince: Wonder Woman	2		Wonder Woman #185–189; The Brave and the Bold #87; Superman's Girl Friend, Lois Lane #93	July 2008	978-1401218256	
Diana Prince: Wonder Woman	3		Wonder Woman #190–198; World's Finest Comics #204	November 2008	978-1401219475	
Diana Prince: Wonder Woman	4		Wonder Woman #199–204; The Brave and the Bold #105	February 2009	978-1401221508	
Detective Comics		Batman: Strange Apparitions	Detective Comics #469–479	December 1999	978-1563895005	
Detective Comics		Batman: Year Two	Detective Comics #575–578	January 1990	978-0930289492	
Detective Comics		Batman: Blind Justice	Detective Comics #598–600	May 2005	978-1563890475	
Detective Comics		Batman: New Gotham –Evolution	Detective Comics #743–750	August 2001	978-1563897269	
Detective Comics		Batman: City of Crime	Detective Comics #800–808, #811–814	July 2006	978-1401208974	
Detective Comics		Batman: Detective	Detective Comics #821–826	April 2007	978-1401212391	
Detective Comics		Batman: Death and the City	Detective Comics #827–834	November 2007	978-1401215750	
Detective Comics		Batman: Private Casebook	Detective Comics #840–845; DC Infinite Halloween Special	December 2008; November 2009	HC: 978-1401220099; TP: 978-1401220150	
Detective Comics		Batman: The Heart of Hush	Detective Comics #846–850	April 2009; March 2010	HC: 978-1401221232; TP: 978-1401221249	
Detective Comics		Batwoman: Elegy	Detective Comics #854–860	June 2010	978-1401226923	
Detective Comics	1	Faces of Death	Detective Comics (vol. 2) #1–7	June 12, 2012 April 9, 2013	HC: 978-1401234669 TP: 978-1401234676	
Detective Comics	2	Scare Tactics	Detective Comics #0, #8–12, Annual #1	April 16, 2013 November 26, 2013	HC: 978-1401238407 TP: 978-1401242657	
Detective Comics	3	Emperor Penguin	Detective Comics #13–18	November 26, 2013 July 1, 2014	HC: 978-1401242664 TP: 978-1401246341	
Detective Comics	4	The Wrath	Detective Comics #19–24, Annual #2	July 1, 2014 November 25, 2014	HC: 978-1401246334 TP: 978-1401249977	
Detective Comics	5	Gothtopia	Detective Comics #25–29	November 25, 2014 May 26, 2015	HC: 978-1401249984 TP: 978-1401254667	
Detective Comics	6	Icarus	Detective Comics #30–34, Annual #3	May 26, 2015 January 12, 2016	HC: 978-1401254421 TP: 978-1401258023	
Detective Comics	7	Anarky	Detective Comics #35–40; Detective Comics: Endgame #1; Detective Comics: Futures End #1	January 12, 2016 August 2, 2016	HC: 978-1401257491 TP: 978-1401263546	
Detective Comics	8	Blood of Heroes	Detective Comics #41–47; Detective Comics Sneak Peek	August 2, 2016 December 6, 2016	HC: 978-1401263553 TP: 978-1401269241	
Detective Comics	9	Gordon at War	Detective Comics #48–52; Batman: Rebirth #1	December 6, 2016 June 20, 2017	HC: 978-1401269234 TP: 978-1401274115	
Doctor Mid-Nite			Doctor Mid-Nite #1–3	January 2000	978-1563896071	

=== E ===
Title	Vol. #	Subtitle	Material collected	Publication date	ISBN	Notes
Empire			Empire #0–6	June 2004	978-1401202125	
Enemy Ace		War in Heaven	Enemy Ace: War in Heaven #1–2; Star Spangled War Stories #139	August 2003	978-1563899829	
Even More Secret Origins			The Brave and the Bold #34; The Flash (vol. 2) #110; Green Lantern (vol. 2) #10; House of Secrets #61; World's Finest Comics #141	2003		

=== F ===
The Flash		vs. the Rogues	The Flash #105–106, #110, #113, #117, #122, #140, #155; Showcase #8	November 2009	978-1401224974	
The Flash		The Greatest Stories Ever Told	Material from Flash Comics #86, #104; The Flash #123, #155, #165, #179; The Flash (vol. 2) #97; DC Special Series #11	August 2007	978-1401213725	
The Flash		Born to Run	Flash #62–65; material from The Flash Annual #8; The Flash 80-Page Giant; Speed Force #1	June 1999	978-1563895043	
The Flash		The Return of Barry Allen	Flash #74–79	July 1996	978-1563892684	
The Flash		Terminal Velocity	Flash #0, #95–100	September 1995	978-1563892493	
The Flash		Dead Heat	The Flash (vol. 2) #108–111; Impulse #10–11	August 2000	978-1563896231	
The Flash		Race Against Time	The Flash (vol. 2) #112–118	July 2001	978-1563897214	
The Flash		Emergency Stop	The Flash (vol. 2) #130–135	January 2009	978-1401221775	
The Flash		The Human Race	The Flash (vol. 2) #136–141; Secret Origins #50	June 2009	978-1401222390	
The Flash		Wonderland	The Flash (vol. 2) #164–169	October 2007	978-1401214890	
The Flash		Blood Will Run	The Flash (vol. 2) #170–176; story from The Flash Secret Files and Origins #3; Iron Heights	February 2008	978-1401216474	Early editions did not include Iron Heights.
The Flash		Rogues	The Flash (vol. 2) #177–182	February 2003	978-1563899508	
The Flash		Crossfire	The Flash (vol. 2) #183–191	March 2004	978-1401201951	
The Flash		Blitz	The Flash (vol. 2) #192–200	August 2004	978-1401203351	
The Flash		Ignition	The Flash (vol. 2) #201–206	March 2005	978-1401204631	
The Flash		The Secret of Barry Allen	The Flash (vol. 2) #207–211, #213–217	August 2005	978-1401207236	
The Flash		Rogue War	The Flash (vol. 2) #1/2, #212, #218, #220–225	January 2006	978-1401209247	
The Flash		The Wild Wests	The Flash (vol. 2) #231–237	August 2008	HC: 978-1401218287; TP: 978-1845768737	
The Flash		Rebirth	The Flash: Rebirth #1–6	May 2010; May 2011	HC: 978-1401225681; TP: 978-1401230012	
The Flash: The Fastest Man Alive	1	Lightning in a Bottle	The Flash: The Fastest Man Alive #1–6	March 2007	978-1401212292	
The Flash: The Fastest Man Alive	2	Full Throttle	The Flash: The Fastest Man Alive #7–13; All Flash #1; DCU Infinite Holiday Special	December 2007	978-1401215675	
Flash and Green Lantern		The Brave and the Bold	Flash and Green Lantern: The Brave and the Bold #1–6	April 2001	978-1563897085	
Formerly Known as the Justice League			Formerly Known as the Justice League #1–6	April 2004	978-1401203054	

=== G ===
Title	Vol. #	Subtitle	Material collected	Publication date	ISBN	Notes
Gotham Central	1	In the Line of Duty	Gotham Central #1–5	May 2004	978-1401201999	
Gotham Central	2	Half a Life	Gotham Central #6–10; material from Detective Comics #747; Batman Chronicles #16	June 2005	978-1401204389	
Gotham Central	3	Unresolved Targets	Gotham Central #12–15, #19–22	May 2006	978-1563899959	
Gotham Central	4	The Quick and the Dead	Gotham Central #23–25, #28–31	October 2006	978-1401209124	
Gotham Central	5	Dead Robin	Gotham Central #33–40	June 2007	978-1401213299	
Gotham Central	1	In the Line of Duty	Gotham Central #1–10	September 2008; March 2011	HC: 978-1401219239; TP: 978-1401220372	
Gotham Central	2	Jokers and Madmen	Gotham Central #11–22	September 2009; July 2011	HC: 978-1401225216; TP: 978-1401225438	
Gotham Central	3	On the Freak Beat	Gotham Central #23–31	August 2010; October 2011	HC: 978-1401227548; TP: 978-1401232320	
Gotham Central	4	Corrigan	Gotham Central #32–40	May 2011; May 2012	HC: 978-0857681881; TP: 978-1401231941	
The Greatest Batman Stories Ever Told	1		Batman #1, #25, #47, #61, #156, #234, #250, #312; The Brave and the Bold #197; DC Special Series #15; Detective Comics #31–32, #211, #235, #345, #404, #429, #437, #442, #457, #474, #482, #500; Star Spangled Comics #124; World's Finest Comics #94	1988; October 1997	HC: 978-0930289355; TP: 978-0930289669	
The Greatest Batman Stories Ever Told	2		Batman #1, #62, #76, #169, #190, #197, #257, #345–346, #355, Annual #11; Detective Comics #58, #203, #473, #568	July 1992	TP: 978-0446394277	
The Greatest Flash Stories Ever Told			Comic Cavalcade #24; DC Special Series #1; Flash Comics #66, #86; The Flash #107, #113, #119, #124–125, #137, #143, #148, #179; The Flash (vol. 2) #2; Showcase #4	February 1991; April 1992	HC: 978-0930289812; TP: 978-0930289843	
The Greatest Golden Age Stories Ever Told			Material from Action Comics #124; Adventure Comics #51, #67, #144; All-American Comics #6, #92; All-Flash #14; All-Star Comics #37; Batman #30; Crack Comics #19; Detective Comics #1, #69; Flash Comics #4, #96; Kid Eternity #3; Modern Comics #67; More Fun Comics #57; Plastic Man #21; Sensation Comics #1; Star Spangled Comics #77; Superman #61; Wonder Woman #13	1990	HC: 978-0930289577	
The Greatest Joker Stories Ever Told			Material Batman (vol. 1) #1, #4, #63, #73, #74, #110, #159, #163, #251, #321; Batman Kellogg's Special #2; The Brave and the Bold #111; Detective Comics #168, #475–476; The Joker #3; World's Finest Comics #61, #88	1988; 1989	HC: TP: 978-0446391252	
The Greatest Superman Stories Ever Told			Action Comics #241; Forever People #1; Superboy #68; Look Magazine 1943; Superman #4, #13, #30, #53, #123, #125, #129, #132, #145, #149, #162, #247, Annual #11; Superman (vol. 2) #2	1987; 1989	HC: 978-0930289294; TP: 978-0930289393	
The Greatest Team-Up Stories Ever Told			Material from Adventure Comics #253, #267; The Brave and the Bold #53–54, #178; DC Comics Presents #85; The Flash #123; Green Lantern #76; Justice League of America #21–22; Mystery in Space #90; Superman #88, #257; World's Finest Comics #82	1989; 1991	HC: 978-0930289515; TP: 978-0930289614	
The Greatest 1950s Stories Ever Told			Material from Action Comics #238; Adventure Comics #159, #245, #252–253; All-American Western #121; Batman #81; Blackhawk #109; The Brave and the Bold #3; Congo Bill #6; Detective Comics #228; The Fox and the Crow #14; Girls' Love Stories #27; Our Army at War #87; Phantom Stranger #1; Sensation Comics #107; Showcase #6, #8–9, #23; Star Spangled Comics #113; Strange Adventures #28; Sugar & Spike #3; Superboy #22; Superman's Pal Jimmy Olsen #32; Western Comics #78; Wonder Woman #99; World's Finest Comics #64, #77	1990; 1992	HC: 978-0930289805; TP: 978-0930289836	
Green Arrow	1	Quiver	Green Arrow (vol. 3) #1–10	April 2002; May 2003	HC: 978-1563898020; TP: 978-1563899652	
Green Arrow	2	The Sounds of Violence	Green Arrow (vol. 3) #11–15	July 2003; February 2004	HC: 978-1563899768; TP: 978-1401200459	
Green Arrow	3	The Archer's Quest	Green Arrow (vol. 3) #16–21	December 2003; September 2004	HC: 978-1401200107; TP: 978-1401200442	
Green Arrow	4	Straight Shooter	Green Arrow (vol. 3) #26–31	April 2004	978-1401202002	
Green Arrow	5	City Walls	Green Arrow (vol. 3) #32, #34–39	May 2005	978-1401204648	
Green Arrow	6	Moving Targets	Green Arrow (vol. 3) #40–50	February 2006	978-1401209308	
Green Arrow	7	Heading into the Light	Green Arrow (vol. 3) #52, #54–59	August 2006	978-1401210946	
Green Arrow	8	Crawling Through the Wreckage	Green Arrow (vol. 3) #60–65	April 2007	978-1401212322	
Green Arrow	9	Road to Jericho	Green Arrow (vol. 3) #66–75	November 2007	978-1401215088	
Green Arrow		The Longbow Hunters	Green Arrow: The Longbow Hunters #1–3	September 1991	978-0930289386	
Green Arrow		Year One	Green Arrow: Year One #1–6	April 2008; April 2009	HC: 978-1401216870; TP: 978-1401217433	
Green Arrow/Black Canary	1	The Wedding Album	Green Arrow/Black Canary #1–5; Green Arrow/Black Canary Wedding Special	October 2008; September 2009	HC: 978-1401218416; TP: 978-1401222192	
Green Arrow/Black Canary	2	Family Business	Green Arrow/Black Canary #6–10	January 2009	978-1401220167	
Green Arrow/Black Canary	3	A League of Their Own	Green Arrow/Black Canary #11–14; Green Arrow Secret Files and Origins	May 2009	978-1401222505	
Green Arrow/Black Canary	4	Enemies List	Green Arrow/Black Canary #15–20	December 2009	978-1401224981	
Green Arrow/Black Canary	5	Big Game	Green Arrow/Black Canary #21–26	June 2010	978-1401227098	
Green Arrow/Black Canary		For Better or For Worse	Material from Action Comics #428, #434; Birds of Prey #88; Detective Comics #549–550; Green Arrow (vol. 2) #75, #101; Green Arrow (vol. 3) #4–5, #12, #21; Green Arrow: The Longbow Hunters #1; Green Lantern (vol. 2) #94–95; The Joker #4; Justice League of America #75	September 2007	978-1401214463	
Green Arrow/Black Canary		Road to the Altar	Birds of Prey #109; Black Canary (vol. 3) #1–4; Black Canary Wedding Planner; Green Arrow (vol. 3) #75	July 2008	978-1401218638	
Green Lantern		The Greatest Stories Ever Told	Green Lantern (vol. 2) #1, #31, #74, #87, #172; Green Lantern (vol. 3) #3; Green Lantern Secret Files and Origins 2005; Flash and Green Lantern: The Brave and the Bold #2	August 2006	978-1401209612	
Green Lantern		In Brightest Day	Green Lantern (vol. 2) #7, #40, #59, #162, #173, #177, #182–183, #188; Green Lantern (vol. 3) #51; Green Lantern Corps Quarterly #6; The Green Lantern Corps Annual #2; Superman #247	November 2008	978-1401219864	
Green Lantern		The Road Back	Green Lantern (vol. 3) #1–8	June 2003	978-1563890451	
Green Lantern		Emerald Twilight	Green Lantern (vol. 3) #48–50	March 1994	978-1563891649	
Green Lantern		Emerald Twilight/New Dawn	Green Lantern (vol. 3) #48–55	October 2003	978-1563899997	
Green Lantern		A New Dawn	Green Lantern (vol. 3) #51–55	February 1998	978-1563892226	
Green Lantern		Baptism of Fire	Green Lantern (vol. 3) #59, #66–67, #70–75	March 1999	978-1563895241	
Green Lantern		Emerald Allies	Green Lantern (vol. 3) #76–77, #92; Green Arrow (vol. 2) #104, #110–111, #125–126	March 2000	978-1563896033	
Green Lantern		Emerald Knights	Green Lantern (vol. 3) #99–106; Green Arrow (vol. 2) #136	November 1998	978-1563894756	
Green Lantern		New Journey, Old Path	Green Lantern (vol. 3) #129–136	August 2001	978-1563897290	
Green Lantern		The Power of Ion	Green Lantern (vol. 3) #142–150	March 2003	978-1563899720	
Green Lantern		Brother's Keeper	Green Lantern (vol. 3) #151–155; Green Lantern Secret Files and Origins #3	July 2003	978-1401200787	
Green Lantern		Passing the Torch	Green Lantern (vol. 3) #156, #158–161; Green Lantern Secret Files and Origins #2	September 2004	978-1401202378	
Green Lantern	1	No Fear	Green Lantern (vol. 4) #1–6; Green Lantern Secret Files and Origins 2005	April 2006; May 2008	HC: 978-1401204662; TP: 978-1401210588	
Green Lantern	2	Revenge of the Green Lanterns	Green Lantern (vol. 4) #7–13	November 2006; October 2008	HC: 978-1401211677; TP: 978-1401209605	
Green Lantern	3	Wanted: Hal Jordan	Green Lantern (vol. 4) #14–20	August 2007; January 2009	HC: 978-1401213398; TP: 978-1401215903	
Green Lantern	4	Secret Origin	Green Lantern (vol. 4) #29–35	December 2008; February 2010	HC: 978-1401219901; TP: 978-1401220174	
Green Lantern	5	Rage of the Red Lanterns	Green Lantern (vol. 4) #26–28, #36–38; Final Crisis: Rage of the Red Lanterns	July 2009; July 2010	HC: 978-1401223014; TP: 978-1401223021	
Green Lantern	6	Agent Orange	Green Lantern (vol. 4) #39–42	November 2009; November 2010	HC: 978-1401224219; TP: 978-1401224202	
Green Lantern	7	Blackest Night	Green Lantern (vol. 4) #43–52	July 2010	HC: 978-1401227869	
Green Lantern		Emerald Dawn	Green Lantern: Emerald Dawn #1–6	September 1991	978-0930289881	
Green Lantern		Emerald Dawn II	Green Lantern: Emerald Dawn II #1–6	April 2003	978-1401200169	
Green Lantern		Circle of Fire	Green Lantern: Circle of Fire #1–2; Green Lantern and Adam Strange; Green Lantern and Green Lantern; Green Lantern and Power Girl; Green Lantern and the Atom; Green Lantern/Firestorm	June 2002	978-1563898068	
Green Lantern		Rebirth	Green Lantern: Rebirth #1–6	November 2005; May 2010	HC: 978-1401207106; TP: 978-1401227555	
Green Lantern: The Sinestro Corps War		Tales of the Sinestro Corps	Green Lantern (vol. 4) #18–20; Green Lantern Sinestro Corps Special; Green Lantern/Sinestro Corps Secret Files and Origins; Tales of the Sinestro Corps: Ion; Tales of the Sinestro Corps: Parallax; Tales of the Sinestro Corps: Cyborg Superman; Tales of the Sinestro Corps: Superman-Prime	July 2008; June 2009	HC: 978-1401218010; TP: 978-1401223267	
Green Lantern: The Sinestro Corps War	1		Green Lantern (vol. 4) #21–23; Green Lantern Corps #14–15; Green Lantern Sinestro Corps Special	February 2008; May 2009	HC: 978-1401216504; TP: 978-1401218706	
Green Lantern: The Sinestro Corps War	2		Green Lantern (vol. 4) #24–25; Green Lantern Corps #16–19	July 2008; June 2009	HC: 978-1401218003; TP: 978-1401220365	
Green Lantern Corps	1	To Be a Lantern	Green Lantern Corps #1–6	May 2007	978-1401213565	
Green Lantern Corps	2	The Dark Side of Green	Green Lantern Corps #7–13	November 2007	978-1401215071	
Green Lantern Corps	3	Ring Quest	Green Lantern Corps #19–20, #23–26	December 2008	978-1401219758	
Green Lantern Corps	4	Sins of the Star Sapphire	Green Lantern Corps #27–32	June 2009	978-1401222734	
Green Lantern Corps	5	Emerald Eclipse	Green Lantern Corps #33–38	November 2009; November 2010	HC: 978-1401225285; TP: 978-1401225292	
Green Lantern Corps	6	Blackest Night	Green Lantern Corps #39–47	July 2010	HC: 978-1401227883	
Green Lantern Corps		Recharge	Green Lantern Corps: Recharge #1–5	June 2006	978-1401209629	
Green Lantern/Green Arrow	1		Green Lantern (vol. 2) #76–82	June 2004	978-1401202248	
Green Lantern/Green Arrow	2		Green Lantern (vol. 2) #83–87, #89; The Flash #217–219	August 2004	978-1401202309	
The Green Lantern/Green Arrow Collection		Hard-Traveling Heroes	Green Lantern (vol. 2) #76–82; Green Lantern/Green Arrow #1–4	March 1993	978-1563890864	
The Green Lantern/Green Arrow Collection			Green Lantern (vol. 2) #76–87, #89; The Flash #217–219	December 2000	HC: 978-1563896392	

=== H ===
Title	Vol. #	Subtitle	Material collected	Publication date	ISBN	Notes
Hawkgirl	1	The Maw	Hawkgirl #50–56	April 2007	978-1401212469	
Hawkgirl	2	Hawkman Returns	Hawkgirl #57–60; JSA: Classified #21–22	November 2007	978-1401214883	
Hawkgirl	3	Hath-Set	Hawkgirl #61–66	March 2008	978-1401216658	
Hawkman	1	Endless Flight	Hawkman (vol. 4) #1–6; Hawkman Secret Files and Origins 2002	April 2003	978-1563899522	
Hawkman	2	Allies and Enemies	Hawkman (vol. 4) #7–14	March 2004	978-1401201968	
Hawkman	3	Wings of Fury	Hawkman (vol. 4) #15–22	June 2005	978-1401204679	
Hawkman	4	Rise of the Golden Eagle	Hawkman (vol. 4) #37–45	May 2006	978-1401210922	
Hawkman			The Brave and the Bold #34–36, #42–44	1989		
History of the DC Universe			History of the DC Universe #1–2	2002; 2009	978-1563897986	

=== I ===
Title	Vol. #	Subtitle	Material collected	Publication date	ISBN	Notes
Infinite Crisis			Infinite Crisis #1–7	September 2006; January 2008	HC: 978-1401209599; TP: 978-1401210601	
Infinite Crisis		Companion	Day of Vengeance Special; Villains United Special; Rann/Thanagar War Special; The OMAC Project Special	October 2006	978-1401209223	
Infinity Inc.	1	Luthor's Monsters	Infinity Inc. (vol. 2) #1–5	June 2008	978-1401218164	
Infinity Inc.	2	The Bogeyman	Infinity Inc. (vol. 2) #6–10	January 2009	978-1401219581	
Invasion!		Secret No More!	Invasion! #1–3	September 2008	978-1401220662	

=== J ===
Title	Vol. #	Subtitle	Material collected	Publication date	ISBN	Notes
JLA	1	New World Order	JLA #1–4	April 1997	978-1563893698	
JLA	2	American Dreams	JLA #5–9	January 1998	978-1563893940	
JLA	3	Rock of Ages	JLA #10–15	May 1998	978-1563894169	
JLA	4	Strength in Numbers	JLA #16–23; JLA Secret Files and Origins #2; Prometheus (Villains) #1	December 1998	978-1563894350	
JLA		One Million	DC One Million #1–4; JLA #1,000,000; Starman #1,000,000;	January 2004	9781401203207	
JLA	5	Justice for All	JLA #24–33	December 1999	978-1563895111	
JLA	6	World War III	JLA #34–41	July 2000	978-1563896187	
JLA	7	Tower of Babel	JLA #42–46; JLA 80-Page Giant; JLA Secret Files and Origins #3	August 2001	978-1563897276	
JLA	8	Divided We Fall	JLA #47–54	February 2002	978-1563897931	
JLA	9	Terror Incognita	JLA #55–60	November 2002	978-1563899362	
JLA	10	Golden Perfect	JLA #61–65	February 2003	978-1563899416	
JLA	11	The Obsidian Age, Book One	JLA #66–71	June 2003	978-1563899911	
JLA	12	The Obsidian Age, Book Two	JLA #72–76	October 2003	978-1401200435	
JLA	13	Rules of Engagement	JLA #77–82	June 2004	978-1401202156	
JLA	14	Trial by Fire	JLA #84–89	October 2004	978-1401202422	
JLA	15	The Tenth Circle	JLA #94–99	December 2004	978-1401203467	
JLA	16	The Pain of the Gods	JLA #101–106	April 2005	978-1401204686	
JLA	17	Syndicate Rules	JLA #107–114; JLA Secret Files and Origins 2004	October 2005	978-1401204778	
JLA	18	Crisis of Conscience	JLA #115–119	January 2006	978-1401209636	
JLA	19	World without a Justice League	JLA #120–125	May 2006	978-1401209643	
JLA Presents		Aztek: The Ultimate Man	Aztek: The Ultimate Man #1–10	May 2008	978-1401216887	
The Joker		The Greatest Stories Ever Told	Batman #1, #66, #73, #110, #321, #613; Detective Comics #332, #475–476, #826; Batman: Black and White Vol. 2; Batman: The Long Halloween #4; The Batman Adventures Annual #1	June 2008	978-1401218089	
The Joker		Last Laugh	Joker: Last Laugh #1–6	May 2008	978-1401217846	
Jonah Hex	1	Face Full of Violence	Jonah Hex (vol. 2) #1–6	September 2006	978-1401210953	
Jonah Hex	2	Guns of Vengeance	Jonah Hex (vol. 2) #7–12	April 2007	978-1401212490	
Jonah Hex	3	Origins	Jonah Hex (vol. 2) #13–18	November 2007	978-1401214906	
Jonah Hex	4	Only the Good Die Young	Jonah Hex (vol. 2) #19–24	April 2008	978-1401216894	
Jonah Hex	5	Luck Runs Out	Jonah Hex (vol. 2) #25–30	October 2008	978-1401219604	
Jonah Hex	6	Bullets Don't Lie	Jonah Hex (vol. 2) #31–36	April 2009	978-1401221577	
Jonah Hex	7	Lead Poisoning	Jonah Hex (vol. 2) #37–42	October 2009	978-1401224851	
Jonah Hex	8	The Six Gun War	Jonah Hex (vol. 2) #44–49	April 2010	978-1401225872	
JSA	1	Justice Be Done	JSA #1–5; JSA Secret Files and Origins #1	April 2000	978-1563896200	
JSA	2	Darkness Falls	JSA #6–15	August 2002	978-1563897399	
JSA	3	The Return of Hawkman	JSA #16–26; JSA Secret Files and Origins #1	November 2002	978-1563899126	
JSA	4	Fair Play	JSA #26–31; JSA Secret Files and Origins #2	May 2003	978-1563899591	
JSA	5	Stealing Thunder	JSA #32–38	October 2003	978-1563899942	
JSA	6	Savage Times	JSA #39–45	November 2004	978-1401202538	
JSA	7	Princes of Darkness	JSA #46–55	March 2005	978-1401204693	
JSA	8	Black Reign	JSA #56–58; Hawkman (vol. 4) #23–25	July 2005	978-1401204808	
JSA	9	Lost	JSA #59–67	September 2005	978-1401207229	
JSA	10	Black Vengeance	JSA #66–75	March 2006	978-1401209667	
JSA	11	Mixed Signals	JSA #76–81	September 2006	978-1401209674	
JSA	12	Ghost Stories	JSA #82–87	January 2007	978-1401211967	
JSA		All Stars	JSA: All Stars #1–8	June 2004	978-1401202194	
JSA		The Liberty Files	JSA: The Liberty File #1–2; JSA: The Unholy Three #1–2	April 2004	978-1401202033	
JSA		Strange Adventures	JSA: Strange Adventures #1–6	February 2010	978-1401225957	
JSA: Classified		Honor Among Thieves	JSA: Classified #5–9	January 2007	978-1401212186	
JSA Presents		Green Lantern	Green Lantern: Brightest Day/Blackest Night; JSA: Classified #25, #32–33	September 2008	978-1401219727	
JSA Presents	1	Stars and S.T.R.I.P.E.	Stars and S.T.R.I.P.E. #1–8	June 2007	978-1401213909	
JSA Presents	2	Stars and S.T.R.I.P.E.	Stars and S.T.R.I.P.E. #0, #9–14	January 2008	978-1401216313	
Justice	1		Justice #1–4	September 2006; June 2008	HC: 978-1401209698; TP: 978-1401211035	
Justice	2		Justice #5–8	February 2007; October 2008	HC: 978-1401212063; TP: 978-1401212070	
Justice	3		Justice #9–12	October 2007; January 2009	HC: 978-1401214678; TP: 978-1401215705	
Justice League		A New Beginning	Justice League #1–6; Justice League International #7	September 1991	978-0930289409	
Justice League International	1		Justice League #1–6; Justice League International #7	March 2008; March 2009	HC: 978-1401216665; TP: 978-1401217396	
Justice League International	2		Justice League Annual #1; Justice League International #8–13; Suicide Squad #13	August 2008; July 2009	HC: 978-1401218263; TP: 978-1401220204	
Justice League International	3		Justice League International #14–22	November 2008; December 2009	HC: 978-1401219413; TP: 978-1401225384	
Justice League International	4		Justice League International #23–25; Justice League America #26–30	March 2009; March 2010	HC: 978-1401221966; TP: 978-1401221973	
Justice League International		The Secret Gospel of Maxwell Lord	Justice League Annual #1; Justice League International #8–12	February 1992	978-1563890390	
The Justice League of America Chronicles	1		The Brave and the Bold #28–30; Justice League of America (vol. 1) #1–3	May 2013	978-1401240820	
Justice League of America		Hereby Elects...	Justice League of America #4, #75, #105–106, #146, #161, #173–174	December 2006	978-1401212674	
Justice League of America	1	The Tornado's Path	Justice League of America (vol. 2) #1–7	June 2007; September 2008	HC: 978-1401213497; TP: 978-1401215804	
Justice League of America	2	The Lightning Saga	Justice League of America #0, #8–12; Justice Society of America #5–6	February 2008; January 2009	HC: 978-1401216528; TP: 978-1401218690	
Justice League of America	3	The Injustice League	Justice League of America (vol. 2) #13–16; Justice League Wedding Special	June 2008; June 2009	HC: 978-1401218027; TP: 978-1401220501	
Justice League of America	4	Sanctuary	Justice League of America (vol. 2) #17–21	January 2009; January 2010	HC: 978-1401219925; TP: 978-1401220105	
Justice League of America	5	The Second Coming	Justice League of America (vol. 2) #22–26	May 2009; May 2010	HC: 978-1401222529; TP: 978-1401222536	
Justice League of America	6	When Worlds Collide	Justice League of America (vol. 2) #27–28, #30–34	October 2009; October 2010	HC: 978-1401224226; TP: 978-1401224233	
Justice League of America	7	Team History	Justice League of America (vol. 2) #38–43	September 2010	HC: 978-1401228385	
Justice League of America	8	Dark Things	Justice League of America (vol. 2) #44–48, Justice Society of America #41,42	May 2011	HC: 9781401230111	
Justice League of America		The Nail	Justice League of America: The Nail #1–3	November 2000	978-1563894800	
Justice League of America		Another Nail	Justice League of America: Another Nail #1–3	November 2004	978-1401202651	
Justice Society	1		All-Star Comics #58–67; DC Special #29	August 2006	978-1401209704	
Justice Society	2		All-Star Comics #68–74; Adventure Comics #461–466	February 2007	978-1401211943	
Justice Society of America	1	The Next Age	Justice Society of America (vol. 3) #1–4	September 2007; November 2008	HC: 978-1401214449; TP: 978-1401215859	
Justice Society of America	2	Thy Kingdom Come, Part One	Justice Society of America (vol. 3) #7–12	April 2008; April 2009	HC: 978-1401216900; TP: 978-1401217419	
Justice Society of America	3	Thy Kingdom Come, Part Two	Justice Society of America (vol. 3) #13–18, Annual #1	December 2008; November 2009	HC: 978-1401219147; TP: 978-1401219468	
Justice Society of America	4	Thy Kingdom Come, Part Three	Justice Society of America (vol. 3) #19–22; JSA Kingdom Come Special: Magog; JSA Kingdom Come Special: Superman; JSA Kingdom Come Special: The Kingdom	April 2009; April 2010	HC: 978-1401221669; TP: 978-1401221676	
Justice Society of America	5	Black Adam and Isis	Justice Society of America (vol. 3) #23–28	September 2009; September 2010	HC: 978-1401225308; TP: 978-1401225315	
Justice Society of America	6	The Bad Seed	Justice Society of America (vol. 3) #29–33	May 2010	978-1401227142	
Justice Society of America	7	Axis of Evil	Justice Society of America (vol. 3) #34–40	December 2010	978-1401229016	

=== K ===
Title	Vol. #	Subtitle	Material collected	Publication date	ISBN	Notes
The Kents		The Kents	The Kents #1–12	2000	TP: 978-1563895135	
Kingdom Come			Kingdom Come #1–4	March 1998; October 1997	HC: 978-1563893179; TP: 978-1852868161	

=== L ===
Title	Vol. #	Subtitle	Material collected	Publication date	ISBN	Notes
Legends		Legends: The Collection	Legends #1–6	1993	1-56389-095-X	
Legion of Super-Heroes		The Great Darkness Saga	Legion of Super-Heroes #287, #290–294, Annual #3	September 1991	TP: 978-0930289430	
Legion of Super-Heroes		1,050 Years in the Future	Adventure Comics #247, #304, #312, #354–355; Superboy #212; Legion of Super-Heroes #300; Legion of Super-Heroes (vol. 4) #0; Legends of the DC Universe 80-Page Giant #2; The Legion #3	June 2008	978-1401217914	
Legion of Super-Heroes	1	An Eye for an Eye	Legion of Super-Heroes (vol. 3) #1–6	December 2007	978-1401215699	
Legion of Super-Heroes	2	The More Things Change	Legion of Super-Heroes (vol. 3) #7–13	December 2008	978-1401219444	
Legion of Super-Heroes		The Beginning of Tomorrow	Legion of Super-Heroes (vol. 4) #0, #62–65; Legionnaires #0, #19–22	September 1999	978-1563895159	
Legion of Super-Heroes	1	Teenage Revolution	Legion of Super-Heroes (vol. 5) #1–6; Teen Titans/Legion Special	November 2005	978-1401204822	
Legion of Super-Heroes	2	Death of a Dream	Legion of Super-Heroes (vol. 5) #7–13	November 2005	978-1401209711	
Legion of Super-Heroes	7	Enemy Rising	Legion of Super-Heroes (vol. 5) #37–44	October 2008; October 2009	HC: 978-1401219932; TP: 978-1401220181	
Legion of Super-Heroes	8	Enemy Manifest	Legion of Super-Heroes (vol. 5) #45–50	May 2009; May 2010	HC: 978-1401223045; TP: 978-1401223052	
The Legion		Foundations	The Legion #25–30; Legion Secret Files and Origins 3003	September 2004	978-1401203382	
Lobo		Portrait of a Bastich	Lobo #1–4; Lobo's Back #1–4	March 2008	978-1401216696	

=== M ===
Title	Vol. #	Subtitle	Material collected	Publication date	ISBN	Notes
Manhunter		The Special Edition	Manhunter #1; Detective Comics #437–443; Batman: Legends of the Dark Knight #100	June 1999	978-1563893742	
Manhunter	1	Street Justice	Manhunter (vol. 3) #1–5	December 2005	978-1401207281	
Manhunter	2	Trial by Fire	Manhunter (vol. 3) #6–14	January 2007	978-1401211981	
Manhunter	3	Origins	Manhunter (vol. 3) #15–23	August 2007	978-1401213404	
Manhunter	4	Unleashed	Manhunter (vol. 3) #24–30	January 2008	978-1401216320	
Manhunter	5	Forgotten	Manhunter (vol. 3) #31–38	May 2009	978-1401221584	
Martian Manhunter		The Others Among Us	Martian Manhunter (vol. 3) #1–8; DCU: Brave New World	July 2007	978-1401213350	
Metamorpho		Year One	Metamorpho: Year One #1–6	June 2008	978-1401218034	
Millennium		Trust No One	Millennium #1–8	August 2008	978-1401220655	

=== N ===
Title	Vol. #	Subtitle	Material collected	Publication date	ISBN	Notes
Nightwing		Ties That Bind	Nightwing: Alfred's Return; Nightwing #1–4 (mini-series)	September 1997	978-1563893285	
Nightwing	1	A Knight in Blüdhaven	Nightwing #1–8	October 1998	978-1563894251	
Nightwing	2	Rough Justice	Nightwing #9–18	September 1999	978-1563895234	
Nightwing	3	Love and Bullets	Nightwing #19, #21–22, #24–29, #1/2	April 2000	978-1563896132	
Nightwing	4	A Darker Shade of Justice	Nightwing #30–39; Nightwing Secret Files and Origins	December 2000	978-1563897030	
Nightwing	5	The Hunt for Oracle	Nightwing #41–46; Birds of Prey #20–21	February 2003	978-1563899409	
Nightwing	6	Big Guns	Nightwing #47–50; Nightwing Secret Files and Origins; Nightwing 80-Page Giant	February 2004	978-1401201869	
Nightwing	7	On the Razor's Edge	Nightwing #52, #54–60	June 2005	978-1401204372	
Nightwing	8	Year One	Nightwing #101–106	August 2005	978-1401204358	
Nightwing	9	Mobbed Up	Nightwing #107–111	March 2006	978-1401209070	
Nightwing	10	Renegade	Nightwing #112–117	November 2006	978-1401209087	
Nightwing	11	Brothers in Blood	Nightwing #118–124	March 2007	978-1401212247	
Nightwing	12	Love and War	Nightwing #125–132	October 2007	978-1401214630	
Nightwing	13	The Lost Year	Nightwing #133–137, Annual #2	March 2008	978-1401216719	
Nightwing	14	Freefall	Nightwing #140–146	January 2009	978-1401219659	
Nightwing	15	The Great Leap	Nightwing #147–153	August 2009	978-1401221713	
Nightwing/Huntress			Nightwing and Huntress #1–4	January 1998	978-1401201272	

=== O ===
Title	Vol. #	Subtitle	Material collected	Publication date	ISBN	Notes
The OMAC Project			The OMAC Project #1–6; Wonder Woman #219; Countdown to Infinite Crisis	December 2005	978-1401208370	
Outsiders	1	Looking for Trouble	Outsiders (vol. 3) #1–7; Teen Titans/Outsiders Secret Files and Origins 2003	February 2004	978-1401202118	
Outsiders	2	Sum of All Evil	Outsiders (vol. 3) #8–15	December 2004	978-1401202439	
Outsiders	3	Wanted	Outsiders (vol. 3) #16–23	November 2005	978-1401204600	
Outsiders	4	Crisis Intervention	Outsiders (vol. 3) #19, #29–33	April 2006	978-1401209735	
Outsiders	5	The Good Fight	Outsiders (vol. 3) #34–41	January 2007	978-1401211950	
Outsiders	6	Pay as You Go	Outsiders (vol. 3) #42–46, Annual #1	July 2007	978-1401213664	
Outsiders		Five of a Kind	Outsiders: Five of a Kind #1–5; Outsiders (vol. 3) #50	March 2008	978-1401216726	
Outsiders	3	The Deep	Batman and the Outsiders Special; Outsiders (vol. 4) #15–20	November 2009	978-1401225025	
Outsiders	4	The Hunt	Outsiders (vol. 4) #21–25	May 2010	978-1401227166	
Outsiders/Checkmate		Checkout	Checkmate #13–15; Outsiders (vol. 3) #47–49	January 2008	978-1401216238	

=== P ===
Title	Vol. #	Subtitle	Material collected	Publication date	ISBN	Notes
Plastic Man	1	On the Lam	Plastic Man (vol. 3) #1–6	March 2005	978-1401203436	
Plastic Man	2	Rubber Bandits	Plastic Man (vol. 3) #8–14	January 2006	978-1401207298	
Pulp Fiction Library		Mystery in Space	Action Comics #186; My Greatest Adventure #7, 12, 15; Mystery in Space #1, 2, 6, 19, 30, 35, 63, 69, 101, 103, 113, 114, 115, 117; Real Fact Comics #1, 3, 6, 11, 15; Strange Adventures #7, 9, 18, 31, 119, 126; Time Warp #5	September 1999	978-1563894947	

=== Q ===
Title	Vol. #	Subtitle	Material collected	Publication date	ISBN	Notes
The Question	1	Zen and Violence	The Question #1–6	October 2007	978-1401215798	
The Question	2	Poisoned Ground	The Question #7–12	May 2008	978-1401216931	
The Question	3	Epitaph for a Hero	The Question #13–18	November 2008	978-1401219383	
The Question	4	Welcome to Oz	The Question #19–24	April 2009	978-1401220945	
The Question	5	Riddles	The Question #25–30	October 2009	978-1401224868	
The Question	6	Peacemaker	The Question #31–36	May 2010	978-1401227609	
The Question		The Five Books of Blood	Crime Bible: The Five Lessons of Blood #1–5	June 2008; June 2009	HC: 978-1401217990; TP: 978-1401223359	

=== R ===
Title	Vol. #	Subtitle	Material collected	Publication date	ISBN	Notes
Rann–Thanagar War			Rann-Thanagar War #1–6	December 2005	978-1401208394	
Rann–Thanagar Holy War	1		Rann-Thanagar Holy War #1–4; Hawkman Special	May 2009	978-1401222543	
Rann–Thanagar Holy War	2		Rann-Thanagar Holy War #5–8; Adam Strange Special	December 2009	978-1401225032	
Red Robin	1	The Grail	Red Robin #1–5	June 2010	978-1401226190	
Red Robin	2	Collision	Red Robin #6–12; Batgirl (vol. 3) #8	November 2010	978-1401228835	
Red Robin	3	The Hit List	Red Robin #13–17	June 2011	978-1-4012-3165-1	
Red Robin	4	Seven Days of Death	Red Robin #18–21, 23–26; Teen Titans Vol. 3 #92	March 2012	978-1-4012-3364-8	
Robin		A Hero Reborn	Robin #1–5; Batman #455–457	January 1991	978-1563890291	
Robin		Flying Solo	Robin (vol. 4) #1–6; Showcase '94 #5–6	July 2000	978-1563896095	
Robin		Unmasked	Robin (vol. 4) #121–125	September 2004	978-1401202354	
Robin		To Kill a Bird	Robin (vol. 4) #134–139	April 2006	978-1401209094	
Robin		Days of Fire and Madness	Robin (vol. 4) #140–145	August 2006	978-1401209117	
Robin		Wanted	Robin (vol. 4) #148–153	March 2007	978-1401212254	
Robin		Teenage Wasteland	Robin (vol. 4) #154–162	November 2007	978-1401214807	
Robin		The Big Leagues	Robin (vol. 4) #163–167	March 2008	978-1401216733	
Robin		Violent Tendencies	Robin (vol. 4) #170–174; Robin/Spoiler Special	November 2008	978-1401219888	
Robin		Search for a Hero	Robin (vol. 4) #175–183	August 2009	978-1401223106	
Robin		The Teen Wonder	Robin (vol. 4) #126, #132; Batman #428, #442; Batman: Legends of the Dark Knight #100; Nightwing #101; Teen Titans #29	May 2009	978-1401222550	
Robin		Year One	Robin: Year One #1–4	May 2002	978-1563898051	
Robin II: The Joker's Wild!		Tragedy and Triumph	Robin II: The Joker's Wild! #1–4; Detective Comics #618–621	November 1993	978-1563890789	
Robin/Batgirl		Fresh Blood	Batgirl #58–59; Robin (vol. 4) #132–133	October 2005	978-1401204334	

=== S ===
Title	Vol. #	Subtitle	Material collected	Publication date	ISBN	Notes
Shadowpact	1	The Pentacle Plot	Shadowpact #1–3, #5–8	March 2007	978-1401212308	
Shadowpact	2	Cursed	Shadowpact #4, #9–13	January 2008	978-1401216337	
Shadowpact	3	Darkness and Light	Shadowpact #14–19	July 2008	978-1401218041	
Shadowpact	4	The Burning Age	Shadowpact #20–25	January 2009	978-1401221591	
Shazam!		The Monster Society of Evil	Shazam! The Monster Society of Evil #1–4	October 2007; March 2009	HC: 978-1401214661; TP: 978-1401209742	
Shazam!		The Greatest Stories Ever Told	Whiz Comics #2; Captain Marvel Adventures #1, #137, #148; Marvel Family #21, #85; Shazam! #1, #14; DC Comics Presents Annual #3; Superman #276; L.E.G.I.O.N. #31; The Power of Shazam! #33; Adventures in the DC Universe #5	February 2008	978-1401216740	
Superboy		The Adventures of Superboy	More Fun Comics #101–107; Adventure Comics #103–121	August 2010	HC: 978-1401227838	
Superboy		The Boy of Steel	Adventure Comics (vol. 2) #0–6; Superman Secret Files and Origins 2009	July 2010	HC: 978-1401227722	
Superboy		The Greatest Team-Up Stories Ever Told	Adventure Comics #216, #253, #271, #280; The New Adventures of Superboy #13; Superboy #55, #63, #80, #171, #182	January 2010	978-1401226527	
Supergirl	1		Supergirl (vol. 3) #1–9; Showcase '96 #12	April 1998	978-1563894107	
Supergirl		Many Happy Returns	Supergirl (vol. 3) #75–80	August 2003	978-1401200855	
Supergirl	1	Power	Supergirl (vol. 4) #1–5; Superman/Batman #19	June 2006	978-1401209155	
Supergirl	2	Candor	Supergirl (vol. 4) #6–9; Superman/Batman #27; Superman (vol. 2) #223; JLA #122–123; JSA: Classified #2	March 2007	978-1401212261	
Supergirl	3	Identity	Supergirl (vol. 4) #10–19; DCU Infinite Holiday Special	November 2007	978-1401214845	
Supergirl	4	Beyond Good and Evil	Supergirl (vol. 4) #23–27; Action Comics #850	August 2008	978-1401218508	
Supergirl	5	Way of the World	Supergirl (vol. 4) #28–33	April 2009	978-1401221294	
Supergirl	6	Who is Superwoman?	Supergirl (vol. 4) #34, #37–42	November 2009	978-1401225070	
Supergirl	7	Friends and Fugitives	Supergirl (vol. 4) #43, #45–47; Action Comics #881–882; Superman Secret Files and Origins 2009	May 2010	978-1401227951	
Supergirl	8	Death and the Family	Supergirl (vol. 4) #48–50, Annual #1	September 2010	978-1401229139	
Supergirl and the Legion of Super-Heroes	3	Strange Visitor from Another Century	Legion of Super-Heroes (vol. 5) #6, #9, #13–15; Supergirl and the Legion of Super-Heroes #16–19	October 2006	978-1401209162	
Supergirl and the Legion of Super-Heroes	4	Adult Education	Legion of Super-Heroes (vol. 5) #11–12, #15; Supergirl and the Legion of Super-Heroes #20–25	April 2007	978-1401212445	
Supergirl and the Legion of Super-Heroes	5	The Dominator War	Supergirl and the Legion of Super-Heroes #26–30	September 2007	978-1401214425	
Supergirl and the Legion of Super-Heroes	6	The Quest for Cosmic Boy	Supergirl and the Legion of Super-Heroes #31–36	April 2008	978-1401216955	
Superman		Escape from Bizarro World	Superman #140; Action Comics #855–857; DC Comics Presents #71; The Man of Steel #5	June 2008; May 2009	HC: 978-1401217945; TP: 978-1401220334	
Superman		Camelot Falls, Vol. 1	Superman #654–658	February 2007; July 2008	HC: 978-1401212049; TP: 978-1401212056	
Superman		Camelot Falls, Vol. 2: The Weight of the World	Superman #662–664, #667, Annual #13	January 2008; March 2009	HC: 978-1401215668; TP: 978-1401218652	
Superman		3–2–1 Action!	Superman #665; Action Comics #852–854; Legends of the DC Universe #14	March 2008	978-1401216801	
Superman		The Third Kryptonian	Superman #668–670, Annual #13; Action Comics #847	October 2008	978-1401219871	
Superman		Shadows Linger	Superman #671–675	January 2009	978-1401221256	
Superman		The Coming of Atlas	Superman #677–680; 1st Issue Special #1	May 2009; April 2010	HC: 978-1848562226; TP: 978-1401221324	
Superman		Mon-El, Vol. 1	Superman #684–690; Action Comics #874, Annual #10	February 2010	HC: 978-1401226343	
Superman		Mon-El, Vol. 2	Superman #692–697, Annual #14; Adventure Comics (vol. 2) #11; Superman Secret Files and Origins 2009	September 2010	HC: 978-1401229375	
Superman	1	The Man of Steel	The Man of Steel #1–6	September 1991	978-0930289287	
Superman	2	The Man of Steel	Superman (vol. 2) #1–3; Adventures of Superman #424–426; Action Comics #584–586	November 2003	978-1401200053	
Superman	3	The Man of Steel	Superman (vol. 2) #4–6; Adventures of Superman #427–429; Action Comics #587–589	October 2004	978-1401202460	
Superman	4	The Man of Steel	Superman (vol. 2) #7–8; Adventures of Superman #430–431; Action Comics #590–591; Legion of Super-Heroes (vol. 2) #37–38	September 2005	978-1401204556	
Superman	5	The Man of Steel	Superman (vol. 2) #9–10; Adventures of Superman #432–435; Action Comics #592–593	November 2006	978-1401209483	
Superman	6	The Man of Steel	Superman (vol. 2) #12, Annual #1; Adventures of Superman Annual #1; Action Comics #594–595, Annual #1; Booster Gold #23	March 2008	978-1401216795	
Superman		The Death of Clark Kent	Superman (vol. 2) #99–102; Superman: The Man of Steel #43–46; Superman: The Man of Tomorrow #1; Action Comics #709–711	May 1997	978-1563893230	
Superman		Godfall	Superman (vol. 2) #202–203; Adventures of Superman #625–626; Action Comics #812–813	September 2004; September 2005	HC: 978-1401203764; TP: 978-1840239195	
Superman		For Tomorrow, Vol. 1	Superman (vol. 2) #204–209	April 2005; May 2006	HC: 978-1401203511; TP: 978-1401203528	
Superman		For Tomorrow, Vol. 2	Superman (vol. 2) #210–215	August 2005; December 2006	HC: 978-1401207151; TP: 978-1401204488	
Superman	1	What Price Tomorrow?	Superman (vol. 3) #1–6	November 20, 2012 July 2, 2013	HC: 978-1401234683 TP: 978-1401236861	
Superman	2	Secrets & Lies	Superman #7–12, Annual #1	July 2, 2013 January 14, 2014	HC: 978-1401240288 TP: 978-1401242572	
Superman	3	Fury at World's End	Superman #0, #13–17	January 14, 2014 August 12, 2014	HC: 978-1401243203 TP: 978-1401246228	
Superman	4	Psi-War	Superman #18–24, Annual #2; Action Comics (vol. 2) #24	August 12, 2014 February 10, 2015	HC: 978-1401246235 TP: 978-1401250942	
Superman	5	Under Fire	Superman #25–31	February 10, 2015 August 11, 2015	HC: 978-1401250959 TP: 978-1401255428	
Superman	6	The Men of Tomorrow	Superman #32–39	August 11, 2015 April 19, 2016	HC: 978-1401252397 TP: 978-1401258689	
Superman	1	Before Truth	Superman #40–44; Divergence: FCBD Special Edition #1	April 12, 2016 October 4, 2016	HC: 978-1401259815 TP: 978-1401265106	
Superman	2	Return to Glory	Superman #45–52, Annual #3; Superman: Rebirth #1; Batman (vol. 2) #50	October 4, 2016 March 14, 2017	HC: 978-1401265113 TP: 978-1401268305	
Superman		World of Krypton	The Man of Steel #1; World of Krypton #1–4; material from Superman #233, #236, #238, #240, #248, #257, #266, #367, #375; The Superman Family #182	June 2008	978-1401217952	
Superman		In the Forties	Superman #1, #23, #40, #53, #58, #61; Action Comics #1–2, #14, #23, #64, #93, #107; World's Finest Comics #37; Superboy #5	November 2005	978-1401204570	
Superman		In the Fifties	Superman #65, #79, #80, #96, #127; Action Comics #151, #242, #252, #254–255; Adventure Comics #210; World's Finest Comics #68, #75; Showcase #9; Superman's Pal Jimmy Olsen #13; Superman's Girl Friend, Lois Lane #8	October 2002	978-1563898266	
Superman		In the Sixties	Superman #141, #146, #156, #161, #164–165, #169–170; Action Comics #289; Adventure Comics #294; World's Finest Comics #175; Superman's Pal Jimmy Olsen #53, #79; Superman's Girl Friend, Lois Lane #20, #42; Superboy #85, #106	October 1999	978-1563895227	
Superman		In the Seventies	Superman #233, #247–249, #270–271, #276, #286–287; Action Comics #484; Superman's Pal Jimmy Olsen #133; Superman's Girl Friend, Lois Lane #106; DC Comics Presents #14	November 2000	978-1563896385	
Superman		In the Eighties	Superman #408; Action Comics #507–508, #554, #595, #600, #644; Adventures of Superman #430; DC Comics Presents #29	April 2006	978-1401209520	
Superman	1	The Greatest Stories Ever Told	Action Comics #775; Look Magazine 1943; Superman #1, #65, #156, #164, #247, #400; Superman (vol. 2) #18; The Man of Steel #1	September 2004	978-1401203399	
Superman	2	The Greatest Stories Ever Told	Adventures of Superman #500, #638; Superman #30, #132, #141, #167, #233, #400; Superman (vol. 2) #2	December 2006	978-1401209568	
Superman/Batman	1	Public Enemies	Superman/Batman #1–6	June 2004; April 2005	HC: 978-1401203238; TP: 978-1401202200	
Superman/Batman	2	Supergirl	Superman/Batman #8–13	March 2005; September 2005	HC: 978-1401203474; TP: 978-1401202507	
Superman/Batman	3	Absolute Power	Superman/Batman #14–18	July 2005; November 2006	HC: 978-1401204471; TP: 978-1401207144	
Superman/Batman	4	Vengeance	Superman/Batman #20–25	July 2006; December 2008	HC: 978-1401209216; TP: 978-1401210434	
Superman/Batman	5	The Enemies Among Us	Superman/Batman #28–33	June 2007; March 2009	HC: 978-1401213305; TP: 978-1401212438	
Superman/Batman	6	Torment	Superman/Batman #37–42	May 2008	HC: 978-1401217006	
Superman/Batman	7	The Search for Kryptonite	Superman/Batman #44–49	November 2008; November 2009	HC: 978-1401219338; TP: 978-1401220129	
Superman/Batman	8	Finest Worlds	Superman/Batman #50–56	June 2009; June 2010	HC: 978-1401223311; TP: 978-1401223328	
Superman/Batman	9	Night and Day	Superman/Batman #60–63, #65–67	August 2010	HC: 978-1401227920	
Superman/Batman	10	Big Noise	Superman/Batman #64, #68–71	December 2010	978-1401229146	
Superman/Shazam		First Thunder	Superman/Shazam: First Thunder #1–4	May 2006	978-1401209230	

=== T ===
Title	Vol. #	Subtitle	Material collected	Publication date	ISBN	Notes
Tales of the Green Lantern Corps	1		Tales of the Green Lantern Corps #1–3; material from Green Lantern (vol. 2) #148, #151–154, #161–162, #164–167	March 2009	978-1401221553	
Tales of the Green Lantern Corps	2		Tales of the Green Lantern Corps Annual #1; material from Green Lantern (vol. 2) #168–169, #171–173, #177, #179–183, #185, #187–190	February 2010	978-1401227029	
Tales of the Green Lantern Corps	3		Material from Green Lantern (vol. 2) #201–205; The Green Lantern Corps #206	December 2010	978-1401229344	
Tales of the Unexpected		Doctor 13: Architecture and Mortality	Tales of the Unexpected #1–8	September 2007	978-1401215521	
Tales of the Unexpected		The Spectre	Tales of the Unexpected #4–8	December 2007	978-1401215064	
Teen Titans	1	A Kid's Game	Teen Titans (vol. 3) #1–7; Teen Titans/Outsiders Secret Files and Origins 2003	April 2004	1-4012-0308-6	
Teen Titans	2	Family Lost	Teen Titans (vol. 3) #8–12, #1/2	November 2004	1-4012-0238-1	
Teen Titans	3	Beast Boys and Girls	Beast Boy #1–4; Teen Titans (vol. 3) #13–15	June 2005	1-4012-0459-7	
Teen Titans	4	The Future is Now	Teen Titans/Legion Special; Teen Titans (vol. 3) #16–23	December 2005	1-4012-0475-9	
Teen Titans	5	Life and Death	Teen Titans (vol. 3) #29–33, Annual #1; Robin #146–147; Infinite Crisis #5–6	July 2006	1-4012-0978-5	
Teen Titans	6	Titans Around the World	Teen Titans (vol. 3) #34–41	February 2007	1-4012-1217-4	
Teen Titans	7	Titans East	Teen Titans (vol. 3) #42–47	September 2007	1-4012-1447-9	
Teen Titans	8	Titans of Tomorrow	Teen Titans (vol. 3) #50–54	July 2008	1-4012-1807-5	
Teen Titans	9	On the Clock	Teen Titans (vol. 3) #55–61	December 2008	1-4012-1971-3	
Teen Titans	10	Changing of the Guard	Teen Titans (vol. 3) #62–69	August 2009	1-4012-2309-5	
Teen Titans	11	Deathtrap	Teen Titans (vol. 3) #70, Annual 2009; Titans (vol. 2) #12–13; Vigilante (vol. 3) #5–6	December 2009	1-4012-2509-8	
Teen Titans	12	Child's Play	Teen Titans (vol. 3) #71–78	April 2010	1-4012-2641-8	
Teen Titans	13	Hunt for Raven	Teen Titans (vol. 3) #79–87	February 2011	1-4012-3038-5	
Teen Titans		Year One	Teen Titans: Year One #1–6	November 2008	978-1401219277	
The New Teen Titans		Terra Incognito	The New Teen Titans #26, #28–34, Annual #2	December 2006	978-1401209728	
The New Teen Titans		The Judas Contract	The New Teen Titans #39–40; Tales of the Teen Titans #41–44, Annual #3	June 1991	978-0930289348	
The New Teen Titans		The Terror of Trigon	The New Teen Titans (vol. 2) #1–5	June 2003	978-1563899447	
The New Teen Titans		Who is Donna Troy?	The New Teen Titans #38; Tales of the Teen Titans #50; The New Titans #50–55; Teen Titans/Outsiders Secret Files and Origins 2003	July 2005	978-1401207243	
Teen Titans/Outsiders		The Insiders	Outsiders (vol. 3) #24–25, #28; Teen Titans (vol. 3) #24–26	January 2006	978-1401209261	
Teen Titans/Outsiders		The Death and Return of Donna Troy	DC Special: The Return of Donna Troy #1–4; Titans/Young Justice: Graduation Day #1–3; Teen Titans/Outsiders Secret Files and Origins 2003	February 2006	978-1401209315	
Titans	1	Old Friends	Titans East Special; Titans #1–6	January 2010	1-4012-1991-8	
Titans	2	Lockdown	Titans #7–11	September 2009	1-4012-2476-8	
Titans	3	Fractured	Titans #14, #16–22	May 2010	1-4012-2776-7	
Titans	4	Villains for Hire	Titans: Villains for Hire Special; Titans #24–27	March 2011	1-4012-3048-2	
Time Masters			Time Masters #1–8; material from Secret Origins #43	February 2008	978-1401216597	
The Trials of Shazam!	1		Trials of Shazam #1–6; DCU: Brave New World	June 2007	978-1401213312	
The Trials of Shazam!	2		Trials of Shazam #7–12	July 2008	978-1401218294	

=== V ===
Title	Vol. #	Subtitle	Material collected	Publication date	ISBN	Notes
V for Vendetta			V for Vendetta #1–10; Warrior #5, #17, #20	November 2005; 1990	HC: 978-1401207922; TP:	
The Viking Prince		Viking Glory The Viking Prince		August 1991; June 1992	HC: 978-1563890017; TP: 978-1563890079	
The Viking Prince		The Viking Prince	The Brave and the Bold #1–5, #7–24; Our Army at War #162–163	2010	HC: 978-1401227777	
Villains United			Villains United #1–6	January 2006	TP: 978-1401208387	

=== W ===
Title	Vol. #	Subtitle	Material collected	Publication date	ISBN	Notes
Wonder Woman		The Greatest Stories Ever Told	Sensation Comics #1; Wonder Woman #28, #99, #108, #163, #178, #214, #286, Wonder Woman (vol. 2) #20, #170	April 2007	TP: 978-1401212162	
Wonder Woman	1	Gods and Mortals	Wonder Woman (vol. 2) #1–7	March 2004	978-1401201975	
Wonder Woman	2	Challenge of the Gods	Wonder Woman (vol. 2) #8–14	October 2004	978-1401203245	
Wonder Woman	3	Beauty and the Beasts	Wonder Woman (vol. 2) #15–19; Action Comics #600	October 2005	978-1401204846	
Wonder Woman	4	Destiny Calling	Wonder Woman (vol. 2) #20–24, Annual #1	June 2006	978-1401209438	
Wonder Woman		The Contest	Wonder Woman (vol. 2) #0, #90–93	April 1995	978-1563891946	
Wonder Woman		The Challenge of Artemis	Wonder Woman (vol. 2) #94–100	May 1996	978-1563892646	
Wonder Woman		Second Genesis	Wonder Woman (vol. 2) #101–105	April 1997	978-1563893186	
Wonder Woman		Lifelines	Wonder Woman (vol. 2) #106–112	February 1998	978-1563894039	
Wonder Woman		Paradise Lost	Wonder Woman (vol. 2) #164–170; Wonder Woman Secret Files and Origins #2	February 2002	978-1563897924	
Wonder Woman		Paradise Found	Wonder Woman (vol. 2) #171–177; Wonder Woman Secret Files and Origins #3	April 2003	978-1563899560	
Wonder Woman		Down to Earth	Wonder Woman (vol. 2) #195–200	August 2004	978-1401202262	
Wonder Woman		Bitter Rivals	Wonder Woman (vol. 2) #201–205	January 2004; February 2005	HC: 978-1415594766; TP: 978-1401204624	
Wonder Woman		Eyes of the Gorgon	Wonder Woman (vol. 2) #206–213	October 2005	978-1401207977	
Wonder Woman		Land of the Dead	Wonder Woman (vol. 2) #214–217; The Flash (vol. 2) #219	February 2006	978-1401209384	
Wonder Woman		Mission's End	Wonder Woman (vol. 2) #218–226	July 2006	978-1401210939	
Wonder Woman	1	Who is Wonder Woman?	Wonder Woman (vol. 3) #1–4, Annual #1	January 2008; February 2009	HC: 978-1401212339; TP: 978-1401212346	
Wonder Woman	2	Love and Murder	Wonder Woman (vol. 3) #6–10	November 2007; June 2009	HC: 978-1401214876; TP: 978-1401217082	
Wonder Woman	3	The Circle	Wonder Woman (vol. 3) #14–19	September 2008; September 2009	HC: 978-1401219321; TP: 978-1401220112	
Wonder Woman	4	Ends of the Earth	Wonder Woman (vol. 3) #20–25	March 2009; April 2010	HC: 978-1401221362; TP: 978-1401221379	
Wonder Woman	5	Rise of the Olympian	Wonder Woman (vol. 3) #26–33; DC Universe #0	November 2009	HC: 978-1401225407; TP: 978-1401225131	
Wonder Woman	6	Warkiller	Wonder Woman (vol. 3) #34–39	May 2010	978-1401227791	
Wonder Woman	7	Contagion	Wonder Woman (vol. 3) #40–44	October 2010	978-1401229207	
World's Finest		Superman/Batman	World's Finest #1–3	April 1993; July 2008	TP: 978-1563890680; HC: 978-1401218096	Hardcover is Deluxe Edition
World's Finest			World's Finest (vol. 2) #1–4; Action Comics #865; DC Comics Presents #31	August 2010	978-1848568044	
World War III			World War III #1–4; 52 #50	December 2007	978-1401215040	

=== Y ===
Title	Vol. #	Subtitle	Material collected	Publication date	ISBN	Notes
Year One		Batman/Ra's al Ghul	Year One: Batman/Ra's al Ghul #1–2	January 2006	978-1401209049	
