= Wonder Woman: Year One =

Comic book story arc

- Publisher: DC Comics
- Publication date: September 2016 – March 2017
- Genre: Superhero; Mythology
- Title(s): Wonder Woman vol. 5, #2, 4, 6, 8, 10, 12, 14
- Main character(s): Wonder Woman; Steve Trevor; Cheetah

Creative team
- Writer: Greg Rucka
- Artist(s): Nicola Scott; Bilquis Evely
- Colorist: Romulo Fajardo Jr.

"Wonder Woman: Year One" is a seven issue comic book story arc written by Greg Rucka, with pencils by Nicola Scott and colors by Romulo Fajardo Jr. The story "Interlude" featuring Cheetah's alter-ego Barbara Ann Minerva is drawn by Bilquis Evely and is included as part of Year One. The storyline received critical acclaim with critics praising the art, action, characterization of Diana Prince, Steve Trevor, and Barbara Ann Minevra.

== Plot ==
Steve Trevor accidentally arrives on Themyscira after his plane is shot down by a mysterious group and meets the Amazons. The Amazons debate on what they should do and realize they need to send a Champion to Earth to defeat Ares. Queen Hippolyta decides to send in Diana Prince after she successfully parries Steve's bullets. When they head back to Earth, police decide to put Wonder Woman in a cell until they know what to do with her, and Steve meets Lieutenant Etta Candy to debrief on her.

Diana Prince does not know how to speak English so she starts talking Greek, and Etta sends in Barbara Minevra to translate for her. In the past, it was revealed that Minevra was a struggling archaeologist who tried to find Themyscira, but failed. Wonder Woman realizes that her Lasso of Truth allows her to communicate with Etta, Barbara, and Steve and at a mall when The Sear Group (same group who shot down Steve Trevor's plane) attack, but Wonder Woman and Steve help apprehend them.

Wonder Woman tells Steve that she can not go home and while debriefing in front of the group, Ares attacks. Wonder Woman willingly surrenders in front of Ares, and manages to defeat him in a sneak attack. Her actions across Washington DC make the public know her and refer to her as "Wonder Woman".

== Critical reception ==
According to Comic Book Roundup, Wonder Woman Volume 5, #2 received a score of 8.5 out of 10 based on 26 reviews.

According to Comic Book Roundup, Wonder Woman #4 received a score of 9 out of 10 based on 20 reviews.

According to Comic Book Roundup, Wonder Woman #6 received a score of 8.8 out of 10 based on 16 reviews.

According to Comic Book Roundup, Wonder Woman #8 received a score of 8.5 out of 10 based on 14 reviews.

According to Comic Book Roundup, Wonder Woman #10 received a score of 9.3 out of 10 based on 10 reviews.

According to Comic Book Roundup, Wonder Woman #12 received a score of 9.2 out of 10 based on 10 reviews.

According to Comic Book Roundup, Wonder Woman #14 received a score of 9.4 out of 10 based on 14 reviews.

== Collected editions ==
- Wonder Woman Vol. 2: Year One collects Wonder Woman vol. 5 #2, 4, 6, 8, 10, 12, 14, 168 pages, May 2017, ISBN 978-1401268800
- Wonder Woman: The Rebirth Deluxe Edition, Book 1 collects Wonder Woman: Rebirth #1 and Wonder Woman vol. 5 #1–14, 360 pages, October 2017, ISBN 978-1401276782
