= Batman: City of Crime =

2005–06 DC Comics storyline

"City of Crime"
- Publisher: DC Comics
- Publication date: January 2005 – February 2006
- Title(s): Detective Comics #800-808, #811-814
- Main character(s): Batman; Jim Gordon; Robin

Creative team
- Writer(s): Andersen Gabrych, David Lapham
- Penciller(s): Pete Woods, Ramon Bachs, David Lapham
- Inker(s): Nathan Massengill, Javier Bergantiño

City of Crime is a Batman comic book story arc written by David Lapham, with art by Ramon Bachs and Nathan Massengill. It was originally published in 13 parts by the comic book publishing company DC Comics from January 2005 through February 2006 for Detective Comics, issues 800 through 808, then issues 811 through 814, and then later compiled as a trade paperback. These individual comics started in January 2005 and ended February 2006.

== Plot ==
After dealing with crime, Bruce Wayne heads to a gala called Waterfront Reclamation Project that was supposed to help low-income residents affected by the earthquake during No Man's Land. A young underage girl name Haddie McNeil tries to seduce Bruce, but he rejects her. Days later, Batman finds her dead due to overdose and the main culprit seems to be a young man name Mickey Gravesly. A group of criminals kill Mickey, and plan to dump his body in the river, but Batman arrives and brutally beats them up. He realizes that someone set Haddie's building on fire, and asks Tim Drake to help him.

As Batman and Robin save people from the building (which is owned by the Penguin) they discover 5 pregnant bodies burned. A woman finds out her daughter Cassie is missing, and goes to Gotham City Police Department for help, when suddenly Mr. Freeze barges in Joseph Hirsh's (an attorney) office. Mr. Freeze starts killing Joseph Hirsche and people randomly while Batman tracks down a man name Teddy Washburn who worked for Two-Face, Riddler, and Black Mask's gangs to steal babies and sell them. He scares Teddy's wife and tries to track down people who knew Teddy; meanwhile a man who steals people's faces tries to kill Penguin but fails, triggering an explosion in Penguin's house.

Tim Drake prevents a man named Eric Cushing from killing his own baby after Eric killed his own wife, while Mr. Freeze captures a young girl and a priest in order to marry her. Ventriloquist receives a message from The Penguin, and orders his men to kill Freeze. Batman investigates a man name Dr. Lovely who committed suicide about his connections with Freeze. Batman intervenes the fight between Freeze and Ventriloquist's men, but someone shoots Freeze's helmet before escaping. Batman defeats the thugs but realizes that the thugs dissolve after being defeated. The priest tries escaping from Freeze, but Freeze kills him before the kidnapped girl (whose name is Michelle Blake) incapacitates him right as Batman arrives on the scene. Elsewhere, two Gotham cops, Iver and Elliot, try to solve the mystery, and they discover that Cassie is with Marcus who shot himself with a shotgun.

Batman and Robin confront the Ventriloquist about Cassie and Marcus' bodies, but Batman gets an alert about Cassie's body. He visits the morgue, when suddenly Cassie's body attacks, but Batman neutralizes it. While heading to Cassie's house, Batman is attacked by the same army but is saved by the Penguin. Elsewhere, Elliot starts threatening Frank and Cassie's family, revealing that he had some role but Cassie's mother kills him. Batman starts investigating in Crown Point and learns of another string of murderers, and decides to disguise himself as a construction worker for the Gotham Waterfront Reclamation Project. (Issue 807) As Bruce Wayne gets closer to a man name Raffi who seems to be connected to the abduction of Cassie and the mysterious murders, Tim Drake is forced to apprehend Seargant Iver who has gone insane, and asks James Gordon for help.

Bruce deduces that Raffi knows a mysterious man called the Smiling Man, and asks Raffi's wife Siran for more information. A mysterious man poisoned a homeless man name Jeffrey, who starts spreading fear across the neighborhood. Raffi strangles him to near death, while Bruce notices that Raffi was not under the control of the fear toxin. (Issue 811) Tim Drake and Commissioner Gordon fend off attackers while Bruce Wayne suddenly collapses after seeing Raleigh Park. He has vision of Gotham City taunting him and the corpses of Cassie and Maddie; Bruce wakes up and tells Siran that he will take her somewhere place. He knocks out Raffi, and suits up as Batman to head into Raleigh Park.

Tim Drake and Commissioner Gordon are exposed to the fear toxin and run away from Ventriloquist and Iver, while Batman knocks out Raffi and confronts the Smiling Man (revealed to be the mastermind) The Smiling Hand kills himself, while a group of pop criminals plan to ambush the Bat-signal. Batman fights off the criminals, while Iver kills the homeless man (the source of the fear toxin and the hallucinations Gotham citizens had to face) before committing suicide. Finally, Batman deduces that the murderer of Cassie was her own mother due to Cassie threatening to run away.

== Reception ==
The critical reception for Batman: City of Crime has been generally positive. Readcomics.org praised the dark atmosphere and gritty character design. Further comment was given on the story not needing to rely on heavy character deaths or integral changes to the whole Batman universe. Reviewers expressed surprise at the dark, gritty, and often-graphic images this comic portrayed. They compared to other highly praised Batman titles, such as War Games. This graphic novel has also been praised by "bringing horror back to Batman."

== Issues ==
- Detective Comics #800 "Alone at Night"
- Detective Comics #801 "City of Crime Part 1"
- Detective Comics #802 "The Secret Keepers"
- Detective Comics #803 "The Horror Show"
- Detective Comics #804 "All You Need Is Love"
- Detective Comics #805 "The Heating Up"
- Detective Comics #806 "A City. Not My Own"
- Detective Comics #807 "Crown Point"
- Detective Comics #808 "The New Face"
- Detective Comics #811 "The Experiment"
- Detective Comics #812 "Pearls and Fine China"
- Detective Comics #813 "A Place of Fear"
- Detective Comics #814 "The Big Show"
