= DC Omnibus =

DC Comics publishing line

DC Omnibus is a line of large format, high quality, full color, hardcover editions published by DC Comics since 2007, reprinting comics previously printed in single issue format. Individual volumes tend to focus on collecting either the works of prolific comic creators, like Jack Kirby and Steve Ditko; major comic book events like "Blackest Night" and "Infinite Crisis"; complete series or runs like Gotham Central and Grayson or chronological reprints of the earliest years of stories featuring the company's most well-known series and characters like Batman and Justice League of America.

== Golden, Silver and Bronze Age volumes ==
In 2013, DC began collecting the earliest stories of some its most enduring series and characters in matching trade dress volumes, titled Golden Age Omnibus, Silver Age Omnibus and Bronze Age Omnibus, replacing the earlier lines Showcase Presents, DC Archive Editions and DC Chronicles. Some of these Age Omnibus volumes are also published as two or three (depending on page count) trade paperbacks.

The final volumes in their respective titles are indicated with a double-dagger (‡).

Title	#	Years covered	Material collected	Pages	Pub. date	ISBN
Adam Strange
The Silver Age		1958–1970	Showcase #17–19; Mystery in Space #53–100, 102; Strange Adventures #157, 222, 226, covers from 217–218, 220–221, 224, 235, 241–243; Hawkman #18	848	July 25, 2017	978-1401272951
Batgirl
The Bronze Age	1	1967–1977	Detective Comics #359, 363, 369, 371, 384–385, 388–389, 392–393, 396–397, 400–401, 404–424; Batman #197; Batman Family #1, 3–7, 9–11	504	December 26, 2017	978-1401276409
The Bronze Age	2 ‡	1977–1982	Batman Family #12–20; Detective Comics #481–499, 501–502, 505–506, 508–510, 512–519; Batgirl Special #1	576	April 2, 2019	978-1401288419
Batman
The Golden Age	1	1939–1941	Detective Comics #27–56; Batman #1–7; New York World's Fair Comics #2; World's Best Comics #1; World's Finest Comics #2–3	824	November 24, 2015	978-1401260095
The Golden Age	1	1939–1941	Detective Comics #27–56; Batman #1–7; New York World's Fair Comics #2; World's Best Comics #1; World's Finest Comics #2–3	824	September 26, 2023	978-1779523419
The Golden Age	2	1941–1943	Detective Comics #57–74; Batman #8–15; World's Finest Comics #4–9	768	August 16, 2016	978-1401263768
The Golden Age	2	1941–1943	Detective Comics #57–74; Batman #8–15; World's Finest Comics #4–9	768	March 25, 2025	978-1799500919
The Golden Age	3	1943–1944	Detective Comics #75–92; Batman #16–25; World's Finest Comics #10–14	784	April 18, 2017	978-1401269029
The Golden Age	3	1943–1944	Detective Comics #75–92; Batman #16–25; World's Finest Comics #10–14	784	March 31, 2026	978-1799507673
The Golden Age	4	1944–1946	Detective Comics #93–112; Batman #26–35; World's Finest Comics #15–22	784	November 21, 2017	978-1401273590
The Golden Age	4	1944–1946	Detective Comics #93–112; Batman #26–35; World's Finest Comics #15–22	784	November 3, 2026	978-1799509592
The Golden Age	5	1946–1948	Detective Comics #113–132; Batman #36–45; World's Finest Comics #23–32	800	June 26, 2018	978-1401278700
The Golden Age	6	1948–1949	Detective Comics #133–153; Batman #46–55; World's Finest Comics #33–42	800	December 11, 2018	978-1401284381
The Golden Age	7	1949–1951	Detective Comics #154–173; Batman #56–66; World's Finest Comics #43–53	824	June 18, 2019	978-1401289652
The Golden Age	8	1951–1953	Detective Comics #174–191; Batman #67–75; World's Finest Comics #54–62	680	September 29, 2020	978-1401299682
The Golden Age	9	1953–1954	Detective Comics #192–210; Batman #76–85; World's Finest Comics #63–70	672	June 1, 2021	978-1779504456
The Golden Age	10 ‡	1954–1956	Detective Comics #211–232; Batman #86–100	688	September 12, 2023	978-1779523099
The Silver Age	1	1956–1958	Detective Comics #233–257; Batman #101–116	728	December 6, 2022	978-1779515421
The Silver Age	2	1958–1960	Detective Comics #258–281; Batman #117–132	744	December 1, 2026	978-1799509745
The Bronze Age	1	1969–1972	Detective Comics #393–422; Batman #217–241	960	October 6, 2026	978-1799508496
Batman and Superman in World's Finest
The Silver Age	1	1952–1961	Superman #76; World's Finest Comics #71–116	632	March 15, 2016	978-1401261122
The Silver Age	1	1952–1961	Superman #76; World's Finest Comics #71–116	632	October 29, 2024	978-1779529510
The Silver Age	2	1961–1966	World's Finest Comics #117–158	688	April 23, 2019	978-1401289058
The Silver Age	2	1961–1966	World's Finest Comics #117–158	688	January 6, 2026	978-1799506621
Batman: The Brave and the Bold
The Bronze Age	1	1967–1973	The Brave and the Bold #74–109	904	January 31, 2017	978-1401267186
The Bronze Age	1	1967–1973	The Brave and the Bold #74–109	894	October 6, 2026	978-1799509288
The Bronze Age	2	1974–1979	The Brave and the Bold #110–156	896	September 4, 2018	978-1401281670
The Bronze Age	3 ‡	1979–1983	The Brave and the Bold #157–200	904	September 7, 2021	978-1401292829
Doom Patrol
The Silver Age		1963–1968	My Greatest Adventure #80–85; Doom Patrol #86–121; The Brave and the Bold #65; Challengers of the Unknown #48	1080	June 27, 2017	978-1401273552
The Silver Age		1963–1968	My Greatest Adventure #80–85; Doom Patrol #86–121; The Brave and the Bold #65; Challengers of the Unknown #48	1080	March 18, 2025	978-1799500834
The Bronze Age		1977–1989	Doom Patrol (vol. 2) #1–18, Annual #1, and more: Showcase #94–96; The Superman Family #191–193; New Teen Titans #13–15; DC Comics Presents #52; Daring New Adventures of Supergirl #7–9; Teen Titans Spotlight #9; Secret Origins Annual #1; Doom Patrol and Suicide Squad Special #1; Superman #20; Pages from New Teen Titans #10 and Invasion! #2–3	1056	November 29, 2019	978-1401298838
The Flash
The Silver Age	1	1956–1962	Showcase #4, 8, 13–14; The Flash (vol. 1) #105–132	864	September 30, 2014	978-1401251499
The Silver Age	1	1956–1962	Additionally reprints: Flash Comics #104	864	December 24, 2018	978-1401290757 (Note: Second edition.)
The Silver Age	2	1962–1966	The Flash #133–163	784	January 17, 2017	978-1401265380
The Silver Age	3 ‡	1966–1970	The Flash #164–199	800	July 24, 2018	978-1401281045
Green Arrow
The Golden Age	1	1941–1947	Green Arrow stories from: More Fun Comics #73–107; Adventure Comics #103–117; World's Finest Comics #7–28	792	January 9, 2018	978-1401277208
The Golden Age	1	1941–1947	Green Arrow stories from: More Fun Comics #73–107; Adventure Comics #103–117; World's Finest Comics #7–28	792	February 17, 2026	978-1799507390
Green Lantern
The Silver Age	1	1959–1965	Showcase #22–24; Green Lantern (vol. 2) #1–35	1000	March 7, 2017	978-1401268572
The Silver Age	1	1959–1965	Showcase #22–24; Green Lantern (vol. 2) #1–35	1000	November 28, 2023	978-1779525826
The Silver Age	2 ‡	1965–1970	Green Lantern #36–75	1000	April 17, 2018	978-1401278021
The Silver Age	2 ‡	1965–1970	Green Lantern #36–75	1000	April 29, 2025	978-1799501220
The House of Mystery
The Bronze Age	1	1968–1972	The House of Mystery #174–200	792	January 8, 2019	978-1401285661
The Bronze Age	1	1968–1972	The House of Mystery #174–200	792	October 28, 2025	978-1799502968
The Bronze Age	2	1972–1974	The House of Mystery #201–226	840	July 11, 2020	978-1401299477
The Bronze Age	2	1972–1974	The House of Mystery #201–226	840	October 6, 2026	978-1799509264
The Bronze Age	3	1974–1977	The House of Mystery #227–254	912	November 8, 2022	978-1779511324
The House of Secrets
The Bronze Age	1	1969–1973	The House of Secrets #81–111	864	February 13, 2018	978-1401276843
The Bronze Age	1	1969–1973	The House of Secrets #81–111	864	September 1, 2026	978-1799509080
The Bronze Age	2 ‡	1973–1978	The House of Secrets #112–154; "Night of the Rat" by Gerry Conway and Nestor Redondo, previously unpublished	872	December 31, 2019	978-1401294656
The Bronze Age	2 ‡	1973–1978	The House of Secrets #112–154; "Night of the Rat" by Gerry Conway and Nestor Redondo, previously unpublished	872	April 27, 2027	978-1799516514
The Joker
The Bronze Age		1973–1986	The Joker #1–10, and more: Batman #251, 260, 286, 291–294, 321, 353, 365–366, 400; The Brave and The Bold #111, 118, 129–130, 141, 191; Detective Comics #475–476, 504, 526, 532; Wonder Woman #280–283; DC Comics Presents #41, 72; Justice League of America #77	832	August 20, 2019	978-1401293406
The Bronze Age		1973–1986	The Joker #1–10, and more: Batman #251, 260, 286, 291–294, 321, 353, 365–366, 400; The Brave and The Bold #111, 118, 129–130, 141, 191; Detective Comics #475–476, 504, 526, 532; Wonder Woman #280–283; DC Comics Presents #41, 72; Justice League of America #77	832	February 24, 2026	978-1799507406
Justice League of America
The Silver Age	1	1960–1964	The Brave and the Bold #28–30; Justice League of America #1–30	896	April 22, 2014	978-1401248420
The Silver Age	1	1960–1964	The Brave and the Bold #28–30; Justice League of America #1–30	896	August 11, 2020	978-1779501745
The Silver Age	1	1960–1964	The Brave and the Bold #28–30; Justice League of America #1–30	896	July 7, 2026	978-1799508526
The Silver Age	2 ‡	1964–1969	Justice League of America #31–76; Mystery in Space #75	1056	July 19, 2016	978-1401266608
The Bronze Age	1	1969–1974	Justice League of America #77–113	856	March 28, 2017	978-1401268060
The Bronze Age	1	1969–1974	Justice League of America #77–113	856	June 23, 2026	978-1799508267
The Bronze Age	2	1974–1977	Justice League of America #114–146; DC Super Stars #10	784	March 20, 2018	978-1401277857
The Bronze Age	2	1974–1977	Justice League of America #114–146	776	February 23, 2027	978-1799510598
The Bronze Age	3	1977–1980	Justice League of America #147–182, and more: Super-Team Family #11–14; DC Special #27; DC Special Series #6; Secret Society of Super Villains #15; DC Comics Presents #17; Pages from Amazing World of DC Comics #14	1192	July 6, 2021	978-1401289485
The Bronze Age	4	1980–1982	Justice League of America #183–206, and more: Action Comics #534–535; Wonder Woman #291–293; The New Teen Titans #4; The Fury of Firestorm (vol. 2) #4	848	October 6, 2026	978-1799502838
Legion of Super-Heroes
The Silver Age	1	1958–1965	Adventure Comics #247, 267, 282, 290, 293, 300–328; Action Comics #267, 276, 287, 289; Superman #147, Annual #4; Superman's Pal Jimmy Olsen #72, 76; Superboy #86, 89, 98, 117	680	August 8, 2017	978-1401271022
The Silver Age	2	1965–1967	Adventure Comics #329–360; Superboy #124–125	680	July 3, 2018	978-1401280550
The Silver Age	3 ‡	1967–1970	Adventure Comics #361–380; Action Comics #377–387, 389–392; Superboy #147; Superman's Pal Jimmy Olsen #106	688	June 23, 2020	978-1779502438
The Phantom Stranger
The Bronze Age		1952–1986	The Phantom Stranger #1–6, (vol. 2) #1–41, and more: The Brave and the Bold #89, 98, 145; Showcase #80; Justice League of America #103; House of Secrets #150; Secret Origins (vol. 2) #10; DC Super Stars #18; DC Comics Presents #25, 72; Backup stories from The Saga of the Swamp Thing (vol. 2) #1–13; Character profile from Who's Who: The Definitive Directory of the DC Universe Volume XVIII	1184	August 29, 2023	978-1779506030
Robin
The Bronze Age		1967–1983	Robin stories from: Batman #192, 202, 213, 227, 229–231, 234–236, 239–242, 244–245, 248–250, 252, 254, 259, 333, 337–339, 341–343; Detective Comics #390–391, 394–395, 398–403, 445, 447, 450–451, 481–495; Batman Family #1, 3–9, 11–20; World's Finest Comics #200; DC Comics Presents #31, 58	912	March 31, 2020	978-1779500854
Suicide Squad
The Silver Age		1959–1966	The Brave and the Bold #25–27, 37–39; Star Spangled War Stories #110–111, 116–121, 125, 127–128	336	August 2, 2016	978-1401283735
Supergirl
The Silver Age	1	1959–1963	Action Comics #252–307	688	June 14, 2016	978-1401262464
The Silver Age	1	1959–1963	Action Comics #252–307	688	June 9, 2026	978-1799508052
The Silver Age	2 ‡	1964–1969	Action Comics #308–340, 342, 344–350, 353–354, 356–376	704	May 22, 2018	978-1401278618
The Silver Age	2 ‡	1964–1969	Action Comics #308–340, 342, 344–350, 353–354, 356–376	704	March 30, 2027	978-1799510581
Superman
The Golden Age	1	1938–1940	Action Comics #1–31; Superman #1–7; The New York World's Fair Comics 1939, 1940	784	June 11, 2013	978-1401241896
The Golden Age	1	1938–1940	Action Comics #1–31; Superman #1–7; The New York World's Fair Comics 1939, 1940	784	December 3, 2019	978-1779501004
The Golden Age	1	1938–1940	Action Comics #1–31; Superman #1–7; The New York World's Fair Comics 1939, 1940	784	June 3, 2025	978-1799501664
The Golden Age	2	1941–1942	Action Comics #32–47; Superman #8–15; World's Best Comics #1; World's Finest Comics #2–5	750	July 12, 2016	978-1401263249
The Golden Age	3	1942–1943	Action Comics #48–65; Superman #16–24; World's Finest Comics #6–10	720	December 20, 2016	978-1401270117
The Golden Age	4	1943–1945	Action Comics #66–85; Superman #25–33; World's Finest Comics #11–18	500	May 30, 2017	978-1401272579
The Golden Age	5	1945–1947	Action Comics #86–105; Superman #34–43; World's Finest Comics #19–25	768	January 30, 2018	978-1401274764
The Golden Age	6	1947–1948	Action Comics #106–125; Superman #44–54; World's Finest Comics #26–36	824	August 6, 2019	978-1401291938
The Golden Age	7	1948–1950	Action Comics #126–143; Superman #55–65; World's Finest Comics #37–47	816	October 25, 2022	978-1779505606
The Silver Age	1	1958–1960	Action Comics #241–265; Superman #122–137	680	March 12, 2024	978-1779522931
The Silver Age	2	1960–1962	Action Comics #266–288; Superman #138–153; Batman #140	776	September 15, 2026	978-1799502760
Swamp Thing
The Bronze Age		1971–1983	The House of Secrets #92; Swamp Thing #1–24, (vol. 2) #1–19, Annual #1	724	October 10, 2017	978-1401273781
Teen Titans
The Silver Age		1964–1969	The Brave and the Bold #54, 60, 83; Showcase #59, 75; Teen Titans #1–24; Hawk and Dove #1–6	880	November 8, 2016	978-1401267568
The Bronze Age		1970–1979	The Brave and the Bold #94, 102, 149; World's Finest Comics #205; Teen Titans #25–53; Batman Family #6, 8–9	792	June 20, 2017	978-1401270759
The Bronze Age		1970–1979	The Brave and the Bold #94, 102, 149; World's Finest Comics #205; Teen Titans #25–53; Batman Family #6, 8–9	792	May 19, 2026	978-1799508069
Wonder Woman
The Golden Age	1	1941–1943	All-Star Comics #8; Sensation Comics #1–24; Wonder Woman #1–7; Comic Cavalcade #1–5	776	October 18, 2016	978-1401264963
The Golden Age	1	1941–1943	All-Star Comics #8; Sensation Comics #1–24; Wonder Woman #1–7; Comic Cavalcade #1–5	776	December 5, 2023	978-1779527073
The Golden Age	2	1943–1945	Comic Cavalcade #6–13; Sensation Comics #25–48; Wonder Woman #8–15; The Big All-American Comic Book	768	July 11, 2017	978-1401271466
The Golden Age	3	1945–1947	Comic Cavalcade #14–22; Sensation Comics #49–69; Wonder Woman #16–25	784	November 13, 2018	978-1401280826
The Golden Age	3	1945–1947	Comic Cavalcade #14–22; Sensation Comics #49–69; Wonder Woman #16–25	784	December 1, 2026	978-1799509783
The Golden Age	4	1947–1949	Comic Cavalcade #23–29; Sensation Comics #70–89; Wonder Woman #26–34	704	March 24, 2020	978-1401294793
The Golden Age	5	1949–1951	Sensation Comics #90–104; Wonder Woman #35–47; Action Comics #142	688	October 17, 2023	978-1779506672
The Golden Age	6	1951-1955	Sensation Comics #105–106; Wonder Woman #48–71	704	June 18, 2024	978-1779525970
The Silver Age	1	1958–1961	Wonder Woman #98–123	696	January 4, 2022	978-1779513366
The Silver Age	2	1961–1964	Wonder Woman #124–149	704	October 3, 2023	978-1779523150
The Silver Age	3	1964–1968	Wonder Woman #150–177; The Brave and the Bold #63, 78	760	January 27, 2026	978-1799503019
The Bronze Age	1	1973–1977	Wonder Woman #204–227, and more: Justice League of America #128–129, 143, 146; Secret Origins #3; Supergirl #9; Superman's Girl Friend, Lois Lane #136; Freedom Fighters #4–5; The Brave and the Bold #131, 140; Super-Team Family #14; Metal Men #56; Super Friends #11	776	March 2, 2027	978-1799516484

== Modern Age volumes ==
=== Amethyst ===
Title	Years covered	Material collected	Pages	Pub. date	ISBN
Amethyst: Princess of Gemworld	1983–1987	Amethyst, Princess of Gemworld #1–12, Annual #1; Amethyst (vol. 1) #1–16, Special #1; Amethyst (vol. 2) #1–4; DC Comics Presents #63; story from The Legion of Super-Heroes #298	952	October 5, 2027	978-1799516385

=== Animal Man ===
Title	Years covered	Material collected	Pages	Pub. date	ISBN
Animal Man by Grant Morrison	1988–1990	Animal Man (vol. 1) #1–26, and more: "The Myth of the Creation" from Secret Origins (vol. 2) #39	712	August 23, 2022	978-1779516329 (Note: Second edition, published under DC Black Label. First edition was published under the Vertigo imprint.)
Animal Man by Tom Veitch and Steve Dillon	1990-1992	Animal Man (vol. 1) #27–50, and more: Suicide Squad (vol. 1) #58; War of the Gods #3	720	April 14, 2026	978-1799507901 (Note: Was initially announced as a compendium, format later changed to an omnibus.)
Animal Man by Jamie Delano and Steve Pugh	1992-1994	Animal Man (vol. 1) #51-79, Annual #1, and more: Swamp Thing Annual #7; a story from Vertigo Jam #1; pages from The Children's Crusade #1-2	960	February 16, 2027	978-1799516392
Animal Man by Jeff Lemire	2011–2014	Animal Man (vol. 2) #0–29, Annual #1–2, and more: Swamp Thing (vol. 5) #12, 17	816	December 24, 2019	978-1401289416

=== Aquaman ===
Title	Years covered	Material collected	Pages	Pub. date	ISBN
Aquaman by Peter David	1994–1998	Aquaman (vol. 5) #0–49, 1000000, Annual #1–4, and more: Aquaman: Time & Tide #1–4; Tempest #1–4; "Charted Courses" from Showcase '96 #1; "Interview: Making Waves" from Aquaman: Secret Files & Origins #1	1584	July 16, 2024	978-1779526052
Aquaman by Geoff Johns	2011–2013	Aquaman (vol. 7) #0–19, 21–25, 23.1–23.2, and more: Justice League (vol. 2) #15–17	728	December 18, 2018	978-1401285463

=== The Authority ===
Title	#	Years covered	Material collected	Pages	Pub. date	ISBN
The Authority	1	1999–2017	The Authority (vol. 1) #1–29, and more: The Authority Annual (vol. 1) 2000; Planetary/The Authority: Ruling the World #1; Jenny Sparks: The Secret History of the Authority #1–5; "Orbital" and "Isolation" from WildStorm Summer Special; "Requiem" from WildStorm: A Celebration of 75 Years	984	August 6, 2019	978-1401292317
The Authority	2	2004–2007	The Authority (vol. 2) #0–14, and more: The Authority Revolution #1–12; Stormwatch: Team Achilles #4–6, 20–23; Authority: Kev #1; The Authority: Scorched Earth #1; Authority: Human on the Inside #1; Authority: More Kev #1–4; Authority/Lobo Christmas Crossover #1; Eye of the Storm: Coup D'Etat #1–4; Eye of the Storm: Coup D'Etat Afterword #1; Wildstorm Winter Special #1; The Authority/Lobo: Spring Break Massacre #1; The Authority: The Magnificent Kevin #1–5; A Man Called Kev #1–5	1528	July 29, 2025	978-1799502258

=== Batgirl ===
Title	Years covered	Material collected	Pages	Pub. date	ISBN
Batgirl: Cassandra Cain	1999-2001	Batgirl (vol. 1) #1–19, and more: Batman #567, 569; Ghost/Batgirl #1–4; Young Justice #21; Batman: Gotham Knights #2; Batman: Legends of the Dark Knight #120; Detective Comics #734; Superboy (vol. 4) #85; The Batman Chronicles #18; Azrael: Agent of the Bat #56–57, 60–61; a story from Batman: Gotham City Secret Files #1; pages from Young Justice #20–21	1000	February 2, 2027	978-1799516408
Batgirl Returns by Gail Simone	2011–2014	Batgirl (vol. 4) #0–34, and more: Batgirl Annual (vol. 4) #1–2; Young Romance: The New 52 Valentine's Day Special #1; Batman: The Dark Knight #23.1; Batgirl: Futures End #1	960	March 16, 2021	978-1779507198
Batgirl of Burnside	2014–2016	Batgirl (vol. 4) #35–52, and more: Batgirl Annual (vol. 4) #3; "The Algorithm" from Secret Origins (vol. 3) #10; DC Sneak Peek: Batgirl #1	552	January 4, 2022	978-1779513298

=== Batman ===
Title	#	Years covered	Material collected	Pages	Pub. date	ISBN
Batman by Neal Adams		1968–2012	Neal Adams's works from: Batman #200, 203, 210, 217, 220–222, 224–227, 229–232, 234–241, 243–245, 251, 255, Annual #14; The Brave and the Bold #75–76, 79–86, 88–90, 93, 95, 99; Detective Comics #370, 372, 385, 389, 391–392, 394–403, 405–422, 439, 600; World's Finest Comics #174–176, 178–180, 182–183, 185–186, 199–200, 202, 211, 244–246, 258; Batman Black and White #4; Heroes Against Hunger; Limited Collectors' Edition C-25, C-51, C-59; Robin #1; Saga of Ra's al Ghul #4; Batman: Odyssey #1–6; Batman: Odyssey (vol. 2) #1–7	1072	March 15, 2016	978-1401255510
Batman by Doug Moench	1	1983–1985	Batman #360–381, Special #1, and more: Detective Comics #527–547 Covers from; The New Teen Titans (vol. 1) #39; The Best of DC #51	912	April 13, 2027	978-1799516552
Batman: Legends of the Dark Knight	1	1989–1992	Legends of the Dark Knight (vol. 1) #1–36, Annual #1; Batman: Legends of the Dark Knight #37–38; Batman (vol. 1) #474; Detective Comics (vol. 1) #641	1118	June 1, 2027	978-1799516620
Batman by Jeph Loeb and Tim Sale		1993–2005	Jeph Loeb's and Tim Sale's works from: Batman: Legends of the Dark Knight Halloween Special; Batman: Madness – A Legends of the Dark Knight Halloween Special; Batman: Ghosts – A Legend of the Dark Knight Halloween Special; Batman: The Long Halloween #1–13; Batman: Dark Victory #0–13; Catwoman: When in Rome #1–6; "When Clark Met Bruce: A Tale from the Days of Smallville" from Superman/Batman Secret Files & Origins 2003	1176	September 11, 2018	978-1401284268
Batman Black and White		1996–2013	Batman Black and White #1–4, and more: Back-up stories from Batman: Gotham Knights #1–49; Batman Black and White (vol. 2) #1–6	800	December 17, 2019	978-1401295738
Batman: Knightfall	1	1993	Batman (vol. 1) #484–500, and more: Batman: Vengeance of Bane #1; Batman: Shadow of the Bat #16–18; Detective Comics #654–666; "2-Face" from Showcase '93 #7–8	960	April 18, 2017	978-1401270421
Batman: Knightfall	1	1993	Batman (vol. 1) #484–500, and more: Batman: Vengeance of Bane #1; Batman: Shadow of the Bat #16–18; Detective Comics #654–666; "2-Face" from Showcase '93 #7–8	960	September 19, 2023	978-1779523402
Batman: Knightfall	2 (Note: Subtitled Knightquest.)	1993–1994	Batman (vol. 1) #501–508, and more: Batman: Legends of the Dark Knight #59–61; Batman: Shadow of the Bat #19–28; Catwoman (vol. 2) #6–7; Detective Comics #667–675; Justice League Task Force #5–6; Robin (vol. 4) #1–2, 7; "Penguin" from Showcase '94 #7	976	November 14, 2017	978-1401274368
Batman: Knightfall	2	1993–1994	Batman (vol. 1) #501–508, and more: Batman: Legends of the Dark Knight #59–61; Batman: Shadow of the Bat #19–28; Catwoman (vol. 2) #6–7; Detective Comics #667–675; Justice League Task Force #5–6; Robin (vol. 4) #1–2, 7; "Penguin" from Showcase '94 #7	976	February 18, 2025	978-1799500469
Batman: Knightfall	3 (Note: Subtitled KnightsEnd.)	1994–1995	Batman (vol. 1) #509–510, 512–515, and more: Batman: Legends of the Dark Knight #62–63; Batman: Shadow of the Bat #29–30, 32–35; Catwoman (vol. 2) #12–13; Detective Comics #676–677, 679–682; Robin (vol. 4) #8–9, 11–14; "Aftermath" from Showcase '94 #10; Nightwing: Alfred's Return #1; Batman: Vengeance of Bane II: The Redemption	896	June 5, 2018	978-1401278496
Batman: Knightfall	3	1994–1995	Batman (vol. 1) #509–510, 512–515, and more: Batman: Legends of the Dark Knight #62–63; Batman: Shadow of the Bat #29–30, 32–35; Catwoman (vol. 2) #12–13; Detective Comics #676–677, 679–682; Robin (vol. 4) #8–9, 11–14; "Aftermath" from Showcase '94 #10; Nightwing: Alfred's Return #1; Batman: Vengeance of Bane II: The Redemption	896	August 5, 2025	978-1799502418
Batman: Road to No Man's Land		1998–1999	Batman (vol. 1) #553–562, and more: Azrael #40; Azrael: Agent of the Bat #47–50; Batman: Shadow of the Bat #73–82; Detective Comics #719–722, 724–729; Catwoman (vol. 2) #56–57; Robin (vol. 4) #52–54; The Batman Chronicles #12, 14–15; Nightwing (vol. 2) #19–20; Batman: Arkham Asylum – Tales of Madness #1; Batman: Blackgate – Isle of Men #1; Batman: Huntress/Spoiler – Blunt Trauma #1	1248	October 20, 2020	978-1779506610
Batman: No Man's Land	1	1999	Batman (vol. 1) #563–568, and more: Batman: Legends of the Dark Knight #116–121; Azrael: Agent of the Bat #51–57; Batman: Shadow of the Bat #83–88; Detective Comics #730–735; Catwoman (vol. 2) #72–74; Robin (vol. 4) #67; The Batman Chronicles #16–17; Nightwing (vol. 2) #35–37; Batman: No Man's Land (Collector's Edition) #1; Batman: No Man's Land Gallery #1; Young Justice in No Man's Land #1	1120	January 11, 2022	978-1779513229
Batman: No Man's Land	2	2000	Batman (vol. 1) #569–574, and more: Batman: Legends of the Dark Knight #122–126; Azrael: Agent of the Bat #58–61; Batman: Shadow of the Bat #89–94; Detective Comics #736–741; Catwoman (vol. 2) #75–77; Robin (vol. 4) #68–73; The Batman Chronicles #18; Nightwing (vol. 2) #38–39; Batman No Man's Land #0; Batman: No Man's Land Secret Files and Origins #1	1080	August 30, 2022	978-1779517142
Batman by Paul Dini		2001–2019	Paul Dini's works from: Batman (vol. 1) #685, Batman Annual (vol. 3) #1; Batman Black and White (vol. 2) #3; Batman: Gotham Knights #14; Batman: Streets of Gotham #1–4, 7, 10–14, 16–21; DC Universe Holiday Special #1; Detective Comics #821–824, 826–828, 831, 833–834, 837–841, 843–850, 852, 1000	1032	September 22, 2020	978-1779505514
Batman, Bruce Wayne: Murderer Turned Fugitive		2002	Batman (vol. 1) #599–607, and more: Batman: The 10-Cent Adventure #1; Detective Comics #766–775; Batgirl #24, 27, 29, 33; Nightwing #65–66, 68–69; Batman: Gotham Knights #25–32; Birds of Prey #39–41, 43; Robin #98–99; Azrael: Agent of the Bat #91	1056	December 17, 2024	978-1779528032
Batman: The Hush Saga		2002–2022	Batman (vol. 1) #608–619, 685, and more: Batman: Gotham Knights #50–55, 60–71, 73–74; Detective Comics #846–850, 852; Hush interlude from Wizard #0; A stories from Batman: Streets of Gotham #1–4 and "The House of Hush" storyline from #14, 16–21; "The Aftermath" from Batman: Hush: 20th Anniversary Edition	1272	November 14, 2023	978-1779526229
Batman: War Games (Note: Also includes the Batman: War Crimes storyline.)		2004–2005	Batman (vol. 1) #631–634, 642–644, and more: Batman: Legends of the Dark Knight #182–184; Detective Comics #790–800, 809–810; Robin #126–131; Nightwing #96–98; Batman: Gotham Knights #56–58; Batgirl #53, 55–57; Catwoman #34–36; Solo #10; Batman Allies Secret Files #1 (2005); Batman: The 12 Cent Adventure #1; Batman Villains Secret Files #1 (2005)	1152	July 15, 2025	978-1799502142
Batman by Grant Morrison	1	2006–2009	Batman (vol. 1) #655–658, 663–683, and more: "Dark Knight Down" from 52 #30; "Revelations" from 52 #47; DC Universe #0	672	July 10, 2018	978-1401282998
Batman by Grant Morrison	2	2009–2010	Batman and Robin #1–16, and more: Batman (vol. 1) #700–702; Batman: The Return of Bruce Wayne #1–6	760	June 25, 2019	978-1401288839
Batman by Grant Morrison	3	2011–2013	Batman Incorporated #1–8, and more: Batman: The Return #1; Batman Incorporated (vol. 2) #0–13; Batman Incorporated: Leviathan Strikes #1; Batman Incorporated Special #1	672	August 25, 2020	978-1779502711
Batman by Scott Snyder and Greg Capullo	1	2011–2014	Batman (vol. 2) #0–33, 23.2, Annual #1–2	1143	November 5, 2019	978-1401298845
Batman by Scott Snyder and Greg Capullo	2	2014–2016	Batman (vol. 2) #34–52, Annual #3–4, and more: Detective Comics (vol. 2) #27; Batman: Futures End #1; DC Sneak Peek: Batman #1; "Batman's Longest Case" from Detective Comics #1000; Batman: Last Knight on Earth #1–3	928	November 16, 2021	978-1779513267
Batman and Robin by Peter J. Tomasi and Patrick Gleason		2011–2015	Batman and Robin (vol. 2) #0–40, 23.1, Annual #1–3, and more: Batman and Robin #20–22; Robin Rises: Omega #1; Robin Rises: Alpha #1; "A Boy's Life" from Secret Origins (vol. 3) #4; "Better Days" from Detective Comics (vol. 2) #27	1248	November 14, 2017	978-1401276836
Batman and Robin by Peter J. Tomasi and Patrick Gleason		2011–2015	Batman and Robin (vol. 2) #0–40, 23.1, Annual #1–3, and more: Batman and Robin #20–22; Robin Rises: Omega #1; Robin Rises: Alpha #1; "A Boy's Life" from Secret Origins (vol. 3) #4; "Better Days" from Detective Comics (vol. 2) #27	1248	December 3, 2019	978-1401295707
Batman and Robin by Peter J. Tomasi and Patrick Gleason		2011–2015	Batman and Robin (vol. 2) #0–40, 23.1, Annual #1–3, and more: Batman and Robin #20–22; Robin Rises: Omega #1; Robin Rises: Alpha #1; "A Boy's Life" from Secret Origins (vol. 3) #4; "Better Days" from Detective Comics (vol. 2) #27	1248	January 17, 2023	978-1779517043
Batman Eternal		2014–2015	Batman Eternal #1–52, and more: Batman (vol. 2) #28	1208	September 17, 2019	978-1401294175
Batman and Robin Eternal		2015–2016	Batman and Robin Eternal #1–26	624	September 19, 2023	978-1779523037
Batman by Tom King	1	2016–2018	Batman (vol. 3) #1–32, Annual #1 (2017) and more: Batman: Rebirth #1; Nightwing #5–6 (2016); Detective Comics #941-942; The Flash #21–22 (2016); Batman / Elmer Fudd Special #1	1088	August 19, 2025	978-1799502395
Batman by Tom King	2	2017–2019	Batman (Vol. 3) #33–69 and more: The Flash (2016) #64–65; stories from DC Nation #0; Batman Secret Files #1	992	August 4, 2026	978-1799508779
Batman by James Tynion IV	1	2020	Batman (vol. 3) #86–105, Annual #5, Annual 2021, and more: Backup stories from Batman #85, 107–111; Batman: Pennyworth R.I.P. #1; Batman: The Joker War Zone #1 (A, D and E stories); Batman Secret Files: Clownhunter #1; The Joker (vol. 2) #1–4; Punchline #1; Batman story from Infinite Frontier #0; Batman Secret Files #3; "What Comes After a Joke?" from The Joker 80th Anniversary 100-Page Super Spectacular #1; Backup story from The Joker (vol. 2) #14	1088	March 4, 2025	978-1799500636
Batman by James Tynion IV	2	2021-2022	Batman (vol. 3) #106-117, and more: Detective Comics #1027; Batman: Black and White #1; The Joker #5-15, Annual 2021; Batman Secret Files: The Gardener #1; Batman Secret Files: Peacekeeper-01 #1; Batman Secret Files: Miracle Molly #1; Batman: Fear State: Alpha #1; Batman: Fear State: Omega #1	1000	February 24, 2026	978-1799507369
Batman: Urban Legends	1	2021–2022	Batman: Urban Legends #1–12	808	May 26, 2026	978-1799508038
Batman by Chip Zdarsky	1	2021–2023	Batman (vol. 3) #125-136, and more: Batman: The Knight #1-10; Batman: Urban Legends #1-6 (Cheer)	960	April 28, 2026	978-1799507819
Batman by Chip Zdarsky	2	2023-2025	Batman (vol. 3) #137-157, and more: Catwoman (vol. 3) #57-58; Batman/Catwoman: The Gotham War: Battle Lines #1; Batman/Catwoman: The Gotham War: Prelude #1; Batman/Catwoman: The Gotham War: Red Hood #1-2; Batman/Catwoman: The Gotham War: Scorched Earth #1 stories from: Absolute Power: Ground Zero #1; Batman: Black & White (vol. 2) #4; Detective Comics #1027; Harley Quinn: Black + White + Redder #1	1000	April 27, 2027	978-1799516491
Detective Comics
Batman: Detective Comics: The New 52	1	2011–2013	Detective Comics (vol. 2) #0–24, Annual #1–2, Penguin: Pain&Prejudice #1-5	880	June 24, 2025	978-1799501947
Batman: Detective Comics: The New 52	2	2013-2016	Detective Comics (vol. 2) #25-52, Annual #3, and more: Catwoman (vol. 4) #27-28; Batgirl (vol. 4) #27; Birds of Prey (vol. 3) #27-28; Batwing #27; Secret Origins (vol. 3) #2; Detective Comics: Futures End #1; Convergence: Justice League #1; Detective Comics: Endgame #1	1096	June 2, 2026	978-1799508236
Batman: The Rise and Fall of the Batmen		2016–2019	Detective Comics #934–981, Annual #1 and more: Material from Detective Comics #1000; Batman (vol. 3) #7–8; Nightwing (vol. 4) #5–6	1280	December 29, 2020	978-1779506658
Batman: Detective Comics by Peter J. Tomasi		2019–2021	Detective Comics (vol. 2) #27, 994–1016, 1018–1033, Annual #2–3 and more: Batman: Pennyworth R.I.P. #1	1016	August 8, 2023	978-1779521255
Batman: Detective Comics by Mariko Tamaki		2018–2024	Detective Comics #1034–1061, Detective Comics 2021 Annual #1, and more: Batman: Secret Files: Huntress #1; Future State: Dark Detective #1-4; Batman - One Bad Day: Two Face #1; Detective Comics #1027; Batman Secret Files #3; Batman: Black and White #5 (2021)	1000	August 19, 2025	978-1799502401
Batman: Detective Comics by Ram V		2020-2022	Detective Comics #1062–1089, Detective Comics 2022 Annual #1, and more: Batman: Secret Files #1; DC's Crimes of Passion #1; Strange Love Adventures #1	1096	September 29, 2026	978-1799509066

=== Batwoman ===
Title	Years covered	Material collected	Pages	Pub. date	ISBN
Batwoman by J. H. Williams III	2009–2013	Batwoman #0, (vol. 2) #0–24, Annual #1, and more: Detective Comics #854–863	888	October 12, 2021	978-1401297107
Batwoman by J. H. Williams III	2009–2013	Batwoman #0, (vol. 2) #0–24, Annual #1, and more: Detective Comics #854–863	888	August 4, 2026	978-1799508755

=== Birds of Prey ===
Title	#	Years covered	Material collected	Pages	Pub. date	ISBN
Birds of Prey by Gail Simone	1	2003–2006	Birds of Prey (vol. 1) #56–90, and more: Birds of Prey Secret Files 2003 #1	912	October 14, 2025	978-1799502937
Birds of Prey by Gail Simone	2	2006–2020	Birds of Prey (vol. 1) #91–108, (vol. 2) #1–15, and more: Convergence Nightwing/Oracle #1–2; Birds of Prey Giant #1	896	August 4, 2026	978-1799508274
Birds of Prey by Kelly Thompson		2023–2026	Birds of Prey (vol. 4) #1–28, and more: Emotionally Compromised from Batman (vol. 3) #152; Origin Stories for Dummies from Harley Quinn: Black + White + Redder #2; Text material from Birds of Prey: Uncovered	720	June 1, 2027	978-1799516699

=== Catwoman ===
Title	#	Years covered	Material collected	Pages	Pub. date	ISBN
Catwoman of East End		2001–2005	Catwoman (vol. 3) #1–37, and more: "Trail of the Catwoman" from Detective Comics #759–762; Catwoman Secret Files and Origins #1; Catwoman: Selina's Big Score	1064	June 14, 2022	978-1779515032
Catwoman: The New 52	1	2011–2014	Catwoman (Vol. 4) #1-26, and more: Catwoman Annual (Vol. 4) #1; Batman and Robin (Vol. 2) #22; Batman: The Dark Knight #23.4: Joker's Daughter; A story from Young Romance: The New 52 Valentine's Day Special #1	736	March 10, 2026	978-1799507659

=== Deadman ===
Title	Years covered	Material collected	Pages	Pub. date	ISBN
Deadman	1967–1987	Deadman (vol. 2) #1–4, and more: Strange Adventures #205–216 (Note: Seven of these issues were later reprinted in Deadman (vol. 1), therefore this omnibus also includes the entire Deadman (vol. 1)); The Brave and the Bold #79, 86, 104, 133; Aquaman #50–52; Challengers of the Unknown #74, 84–87; Justice League of America #94; World's Finest Comics #223, 227; The Phantom Stranger (vol. 2) #33, 39–41; The Superman Family #183; DC Super-Stars #18; DC Special Series #8; Adventure Comics #459–466; DC Comics Presents #24; Detective Comics #500; "Death Like a Crown" from Secret Origins #15	944	December 8, 2020	978-1779504883
Deadman	1967–1987	Deadman (vol. 2) #1–4, and more: Strange Adventures #205–216; The Brave and the Bold #79, 86, 104, 133; Aquaman #50–52; Challengers of the Unknown #74, 84–87; Justice League of America #94; World's Finest Comics #223, 227; The Phantom Stranger (vol. 2) #33, 39–41; The Superman Family #183; DC Super-Stars #18; DC Special Series #8; Adventure Comics #459–466; DC Comics Presents #24; Detective Comics #500; "Death Like a Crown" from Secret Origins #15	944	March 11, 2025	978-1799500735

=== Deathstroke ===
Title		Years covered	Material collected	Pages	Pub. date	ISBN
Deathstroke: The Terminator by Marv Wolfman	1	1991–1993	Deathstroke (vol. 1) #1–25, and more: Deathstroke Annual (vol. 1) #1–2; The New Titans #70; Superman #68; "The Kobra Kronicles" from Showcase '93 #6–11	1000	December 10, 2024	978-1779528513
Deathstroke: The Terminator by Marv Wolfman	2	1993–1996	Deathstroke (vol. 1) #0, 26–60, Annual #3–4 and more: The New Titans #122; Darkstars #32	1008	April 20, 2027	978-1799516507
Deathstroke: The New 52		2014–2016	Deathstroke (vol. 3) #1–20, and more: Deathstroke Annual (vol. 3) #1–2; DC Sneak Peek: Deathstroke #1	560	October 30, 2018	978-1401284756
Deathstroke by Christopher Priest		2016–2020	Deathstroke (vol. 4) #1–50, and more: Deathstroke Annual (vol. 4) #1; Deathstroke: Rebirth #1; Titans #11; Teen Titans #8, 28–30; Titans: The Lazarus Contract Special #1; "A Wilson Family Christmas" from DC Holiday Special 2017 #1	1368	October 5, 2021	978-1779512604
Deathstroke by Christopher Priest		2016–2020	Deathstroke (vol. 4) #1–50, and more: Deathstroke Annual (vol. 4) #1; Deathstroke: Rebirth #1; Titans #11; Teen Titans #8, 28–30; Titans: The Lazarus Contract Special #1; "A Wilson Family Christmas" from DC Holiday Special 2017 #1	1392	November 3, 2026	978-1799509578

=== Doom Patrol ===
Title	Years covered	Material collected	Pages	Pub. date	ISBN
Doom Patrol by Grant Morrison	1989–1993	Doom Patrol (vol. 2) #19–63, and more: Doom Force Special #1	1200	July 15, 2014	978-1401245627
Doom Patrol by Rachel Pollack	1993–1995	Doom Patrol (vol. 2) #64–87, and more: Doom Patrol Annual (vol. 2) #2; Totems #1; "Spooks Return Satisfied" from Vertigo Jam #1	760	October 18, 2022	978-1779515346
Doom Patrol by John Byrne	2004–2006	Doom Patrol (vol. 4) #1–18, and more: JLA #94–99; Superman (vol. 2) #20; "The Secret Origin of the Doom Patrol" from Secret Origins Annual (vol. 2) #1	672	February 19, 2020	978-1779500847
Doom Patrol by Keith Giffen and Matthew Clark	2009–2011	Doom Patrol (vol. 5) #1-22, and more: Teen Titans (vol. 3) #32, #34-37; Batman: The Brave and the Bold #8; Secret Six #3-4, #30; 52 Aftermath: The Four Horsemen #1-6; DC Comics Presents #52	848	December 9, 2025	978-1799503330

=== Etrigan the Demon ===
Title	Years covered	Material collected	Pages	Pub. date	ISBN
Jack Kirby's The Demon (Standard sized - 6.99" x 1.09" x 10.49")	1972–1974	The Demon #1–16	384	November 25, 2008	978-1401219161 (Note: Standard hardcover sized (6.7x0.6x10.2").)

=== The Flash ===
Title	#	Years covered	Material collected	Pages	Pub. date	ISBN
The Flash by William Messner-Loebs and Greg LaRocque	1	1987–1989	The Flash (vol. 2) #1–28, Annual #1–3, and more: Manhunter #8–9; Secret Origins Annual #2; Pages from Invasion! #2–3	986	May 14, 2024	978-1779525819
The Flash by William Messner-Loebs and Greg LaRocque	2	1989–1992	The Flash (vol. 2) #29–61, Annual #1–3, and more: Adventures of Superman #46; Hawkworld Annual #1; DC Retroactive: Flash - The '80s #2–3; Stories from "Flash Special" #1; Stories from "Christmas with the Super-Heroes" #2	944	September 7, 2027	978-1799516477
The Flash by Mark Waid	1	1992–1994	The Flash (vol. 2) #62–91, Annual #4–6, Special #1, and more: Green Lantern (vol. 3) #30–31, 40; Justice League Quarterly #10	1152	November 1, 2022	978-1779513632
The Flash by Mark Waid	2	1994–1997	The Flash (vol. 2) #0, 92–129, Annual #7–9, and more: The Flash Plus Nightwing #1; Zero Hour: Crisis in Time #4; Impulse #10-11; DC Universe Holiday Bash #1; "Who's Who in the Universe" #10-11	1216	January 14, 2025	978-1779528414
The Flash by Mark Waid	3	1997–2000	The Flash (vol. 2) #142-163, #1,000,000, Annual #10-13, and more: Showcase '96 #12; Green Lantern/Flash: Faster Friends #1; Flash/Green Lantern: Faster Friends #2; The Flash Secret Files and Origins #1-2; Speed Force #1; The Life Story of the Flash #1; The Flash 80-Page Giant #1-2	1184	February 17, 2026	978-1799507352
The Flash by Geoff Johns	1	2000–2001	The Flash (vol. 2) #164–176, and more: The Flash: Our Worlds at War #1; The Flash: Iron Heights #1; The Flash Secret Files and Origins #3	448	May 24, 2011	978-1401230685
The Flash by Geoff Johns	1	2000–2002	The Flash (vol. 2) #164–191, and more: The Flash: Our Worlds at War #1; The Flash: Iron Heights #1; The Flash Secret Files and Origins #3; DC First: The Flash/Superman	848	December 24, 2019	978-1401295325 (Note: Second, expanded edition.)
The Flash by Geoff Johns	2	2001–2003	The Flash (vol. 2) #177–200, and more: DC First: The Flash/Superman	648	April 10, 2012	978-1401233914
The Flash by Geoff Johns	2	2003–2005	The Flash (vol. 2) #192–225 and more: Wonder Woman (vol. 2) #214	880	January 19, 2021	978-1779507501
The Flash by Geoff Johns	3	2003–2005	The Flash (vol. 2) #201–225, 1/2, and more: Wonder Woman (vol. 2) #214	656	September 11, 2012	978-1401237172
The Flash by Geoff Johns	3	2008–2011	The Flash (vol. 3) #1–12, and more: Final Crisis: Rogues' Revenge #1–3; The Flash: Rebirth #1–6; Blackest Night: The Flash #1–3; The Flash Secret Files and Origins 2010 #1; Flashpoint #1–5	880	January 25, 2022	978-1779513458
The Flash by Francis Manapul and Brian Buccellato		2011–2014	The Flash (vol. 4) #0–25, 23.1–23.3, Annual #1–2	709	November 22, 2016	978-1401261030
The Flash: The Road to Rebirth		2014–2016	The Flash (vol. 4) #25–52, Annual #3, and more: Secret Origins #7; The Flash: Futures End #1; DC Universe: Rebirth #1	872	April 14, 2026	978-1799507833
The Flash by Joshua Williamson	1	2016–2018	The Flash (vol. 5) #1–35, and more: The Flash: Rebirth #1; Batman (vol. 3) #21–22; Hal Jordan and the Green Lantern Corps #32; Justice League (vol. 3) #32–33; "Hope for the Holidays" from DC Holiday Special 2017 #1	1008	April 9, 2024	978-1779526984
The Flash by Joshua Williamson	2	2018–2020	The Flash (vol. 5) #36-69, and more: The Flash Annual (2018) #1-2; Batman (vol. 3) #64-65	936	September 23, 2025	978-1799502463
The Flash by Joshua Williamson	3	2019-2023	The Flash (vol. 5) #70-88, and more: The Flash (vol. 1) #750-762, 800, Annual #3; DC Cybernetic Summer #1; Dark Knights: Death Metal Speed Metal #1	888	July 21, 2026	978-1799508540

=== The Fourth World ===
Title	#	Years covered	Material collected	Pages	Pub. date	ISBN
Fourth World by Jack Kirby	1	1970–1986	New Gods #1–11, and more: Superman's Pal Jimmy Olsen #133–139, 141–148; Forever People #1–11; DC Graphic Novel #4; Material from New Gods (vol. 2) #6	1481	December 12, 2017	978-1401274757
Fourth World by Jack Kirby	1	1970–1986	Additionally reprints: Mister Miracle #1–18	1536	September 14, 2021	978-1779512611
Fourth World by Jack Kirby	2	1977–1989	The New Gods #12–19, and more: Mister Miracle #19–25; Adventure Comics #459–460; The Brave and the Bold #112, 128, 138; DC Comics Presents #12; First Issue Special #13; Justice League of America #183–185; Legion of Super-Heroes #290–294, Annual #3, "Prologue to Darkness" from #287; Secret Society of Super-Villains #1–5; Super Powers #1-5, (vol. 2) #1–6, (vol. 3) #1–4; Super Powers Collection #13–23; Super-Team Family #15; "This Light A-Borning" from DC Special Series #10	1336	March 19, 2024	978-1779527103
Fourth World by John Byrne		1997–1998	Jack Kirby's Fourth World #1–20, and more: New Gods (vol. 4) #12–15; Genesis #1–4; New Year's Evil: Darkseid #1; New Gods Secret Files and Origins #1	768	August 10, 2021	978-1779510174

=== Green Arrow ===
Title	#	Years covered	Material collected	Pages	Pub. date	ISBN
Green Arrow: The Longbow Hunters Saga by Mike Grell	1	1987–1991	Green Arrow (vol. 2) #1–50, and more: Green Arrow: The Longbow Hunters #1–3; "Sometimes a Fool Notion" from Secret Origins (vol. 2) #38	1512	June 24, 2020	978-1779502568 (Note: Published under the DC Black Label imprint.)
Green Arrow: The Longbow Hunters Saga by Mike Grell	2	1991–1993	Green Arrow (vol. 2) #51–80, and more: Green Arrow Annual (vol. 2) #4–6; The Brave and the Bold (vol. 2) #1–6; Shado: Song of the Dragon #1–4; Green Arrow: The Wonder Year #1–4	1480	December 28, 2021	978-1779513083
Green Arrow: Archer's Quest	1	2001–2004	Green Arrow (vol. 3) #1–39, and more: Green Lantern #162–164; Green Arrow Secret Files & Origins #1	1024	March 11, 2025	978-1799500681
Green Arrow: Archer's Quest	2	2004–2007	Green Arrow (vol. 3) #40–75, and more: Connor Hawke: Dragon's Blood #1–6	1040	March 2, 2027	978-1799516446

=== Green Lantern ===
Title	#	Years covered	Material collected	Pages	Pub. date	ISBN
Green Lantern/Green Arrow: Hard Travelin' Heroes		1970–2020	Green Lantern (vol. 2) #76–87, 89–123 and more: Stories from: DC Retroactive: Green Lantern - The '70s #1; Brave and the Bold #100; DC Special-Series #1; DC Super-Stars #17; "Time Alone" from Green Lantern 80th Anniversary 100-Page Super Spectacular #1; Backup stories from The Flash (vol. 1) #217-221, 223-224, 226-228, 230-231, 233-234, 237-238, 240-243, 245,246; Backup stories from World's Finest Comics #201, 210, 255	1376	May 21, 2024	978-1779525734
Green Lantern by Geoff Johns	1	2004–2008	Green Lantern (vol. 4) #1–25, and more: Green Lantern: Rebirth #1–6; Green Lantern Corps: Recharge #1–5; Green Lantern Corps (vol. 2) #14–18; Tales of the Sinestro Corps: Superman Prime #1; Green Lantern: Sinestro Corps Special #1; Green Lantern Secret Files and Origins 2005; Green Lantern/Sinestro Corps Secret Files and Origins #1	1008	February 3, 2015	978-1401251345
Green Lantern by Geoff Johns	2	2008–2010	Green Lantern (vol. 4) #26–52, and more: Final Crisis: Rage of the Red Lanterns #1; Blackest Night #0–8; DC Universe #0; Untold Tales of Blackest Night #1; Blackest Night: Tales of the Corps #1–2	1040	August 4, 2015	978-1401255268
Green Lantern by Geoff Johns	3	2010–2013	Green Lantern (vol. 4) #53–67, (vol. 5) #0–20, Annual #1 and more: Green Lantern: Larfleeze Christmas Special #1; Green Lantern Corps (vol. 2) #58–60; Green Lantern: Emerald Warriors #8–10	1104	April 19, 2016	978-1401258207
Green Lantern by Robert Venditti	1	2013-2014	Green Lantern (vol. 5) #21-34, #23.1 Relic, Annual #2 and more: Green Lantern Corps (vol. 3) #21-34, Annual #2; Green Lantern: New Guardians #23-24; Secret Origins (vol. 3) #3, #9; Red Lanterns #24, #28	856	October 28, 2025	978-1799506416
Green Lantern by Robert Venditti	2	2014-2016	Green Lantern (vol. 5) #35-52, Annual #3-4 and more: Green Lantern Corps (vol. 3) #35-40; Green Lantern: Future's End #1; Green Lantern: New Guardians #34-37; Green Lantern/New Gods: Godhead #1; Red Lanterns #35-37; Sinestro #6-8	984	January 6, 2026	978-1799505396
The Green Lantern by Grant Morrison and Liam Sharp		2018–2021	The Green Lantern #1-12, Annual #1 and more: The Green Lantern Season Two #1-12; Green Lantern: Blackstars #1-3	776	May 11, 2027	978-1799516576
Green Lantern Corps
Green Lantern Corps by Peter J. Tomasi and Patrick Gleason	1	2007–2010	Green Lantern Corps #1–3, 7–38 and more: Green Lantern Corps: Recharge #1–5; Green Lantern (vol. 4) #21–25; Green Lantern: Sinestro Corps Special #1; "Exit to Eden" from Showcase '95 #7–8; Peter J. Tomasi stories from Blackest Night: Tales of the Corps #1–3; "Sea of Fear" from Untold Tales of Blackest Night #1	1272	August 1, 2023	978-1779522917
Green Lantern Corps by Peter J. Tomasi and Patrick Gleason	2	2009–2020	Green Lantern Corps #39–47, #59–60, Annual #1, (vol. 2) #0–20 and more: Green Lantern: Emerald Warriors #1–13; Blackest Night #8; Green Lantern (vol. 4) #65–67, (vol. 5) #17, 20; "Sea of Fear" from Untold Tales of Blackest Night #1; "Heart of the Corps" from Green Lantern 80th Anniversary 100-Page Super Spectacular #1	1328	September 17, 2024	978-1779527523
Hal Jordan and the Green Lantern Corps by Robert Venditti	1	2015-2017	Hal Jordan and the Green Lantern Corps #1-21, and more: Hal Jordan and the Green Lantern Corps: Rebirth #1; Green Lantern: Lost Army Sneak Peak; Green Lantern: Lost Army #1-6; Green Lantern Corps: Edge of Oblivion #1-6	784	December 1, 2026	978-1799509769
Hal Jordan and the Green Lantern Corps by Robert Venditti	2	2017-2018	Hal Jordan and the Green Lantern Corps #22-50, and more: Justice League (vol. 3) #32-33; The Flash (vol. 5) #33; Green Lantern 80th Anniversary 100-Page Super Spectacular #1	784	July 27, 2027	978-1799510758

=== Harley Quinn ===
Title	#	Years covered	Material collected	Pages	Pub. date	ISBN
Harley Quinn & the Gotham City Sirens		2009–2011	Gotham City Sirens #1–26, and more: Catwoman (vol. 3) #83	648	April 24, 2018	978-1401278397
Harley Quinn & the Gotham City Sirens		2009–2011	Gotham City Sirens #1–26, and more: Catwoman (vol. 3) #83	648	February 5, 2020	978-1779501509
Harley Quinn & the Gotham City Sirens		2009–2011	Gotham City Sirens #1–26, and more: Catwoman (vol. 3) #83	648	September 20, 2022	978-1779516763 (Note: Third edition.)
Harley Quinn by Amanda Conner and Jimmy Palmiotti	1	2014–2015	Harley Quinn (vol. 2) #0–16, Annual #1, and more: Harley Quinn: Futures End #1; Harley Quinn Holiday Special #1; Harley Quinn Valentine's Day Special #1; Harley Quinn Invades Comic-Con International: San Diego #1; Harley Quinn and Power Girl #1–6; Harley Quinn story from Secret Origins (vol. 3) #4	768	September 12, 2017	978-1401276430
Harley Quinn by Amanda Conner and Jimmy Palmiotti	1	2014–2015	Harley Quinn (vol. 2) #0–16, Annual #1, and more: Harley Quinn: Futures End #1; Harley Quinn Holiday Special #1; Harley Quinn Valentine's Day Special #1; Harley Quinn Invades Comic-Con International: San Diego #1; Harley Quinn and Power Girl #1–6; Harley Quinn story from Secret Origins (vol. 3) #4	768	October 27, 2026	978-1799510901
Harley Quinn by Amanda Conner and Jimmy Palmiotti	2	2015–2016	Harley Quinn (vol. 2) #17–30, and more: DC Sneak Peek: Harley Quinn #1; Harley Quinn Road Trip Special #1; Harley Quinn: Be Careful What You Wish For #1; Harley Quinn and Her Gang of Harleys #1–6; Harley's Little Black Book #1–6	864	October 9, 2018	978-1401284565
Harley Quinn by Amanda Conner and Jimmy Palmiotti	2	2015–2016	Harley Quinn (vol. 2) #17–30, and more: DC Sneak Peek: Harley Quinn #1; Harley Quinn Road Trip Special #1; Harley Quinn: Be Careful What You Wish For #1; Harley Quinn and Her Gang of Harleys #1–6; Harley's Little Black Book #1–6	864	April 13, 2027	978-1799510963
Harley Quinn by Amanda Conner and Jimmy Palmiotti	3	2016–2018	Harley Quinn (vol. 3) #1–34, and more: Harley Quinn 25th Anniversary Special #1; Harley Quin story from Batman Day Special #1	800	October 8, 2019	978-1401294465

=== Hawkman ===
Title	#	Years covered	Material collected	Pages	Pub. date	ISBN
Hawkman	1	2002–2004	Hawkman (vol. 4) #1–25, and more: Hawkman Secret Files and Origins #1; JSA #56–58	688	January 31, 2012	978-1401232221
Hawkman	1	2002–2004	Hawkman (vol. 4) #1–25, and more: Hawkman Secret Files and Origins #1; JSA #56–58	704	September 2, 2025	978-1799502784

=== Hitman ===
Title	#	Years covered	Material collected	Pages	Pub. date	ISBN
Hitman by Garth Ennis and John McCrea	1	1996–1999	Hitman #1–33, Annual #1, and more: The Demon #42–45, 52–54, Annual #2	1136	May 21, 2024	978-1779525901
Hitman by Garth Ennis and John McCrea	2	1999–2020	Hitman #34-60, and more: Hitman/Lobo: That Stupid Bastich #1; Superman 80-Page Giant #1; JLA/Hitman #1-2; Convergence: Harley Quinn #2; All-Star Section Eight #1-6; Sixpack and Dogwelder: Hard Travelin' Heroz #1-6; DC: The Doomed and the Damned #1	1096	December 2, 2025	978-1799503354

=== He-Man ===
Title	Years covered	Material collected	Pages	Pub. date	ISBN
He-Man and the Masters of the Universe	1982–2017	He-Man and the Masters of the Universe #1–6, (vol. 2) #1–19, and more: He-Man: The Eternity War #1–15; Masters of the Universe: Origin of He-Man #1; Masters of the Universe: The Origin of Hordak #1; Masters of the Universe: The Origin of Skeletor #1; DC Universe vs. The Masters of the Universe #1–6; He-Man/Thundercats #1–6; DC Comics Presents #47; Masters of the Universe #1–3	1496	February 26, 2019	978-1401290498

=== Jonah Hex ===
Title	#	Years covered	Material collected	Pages	Pub. date	ISBN
Jonah Hex by Jimmy Palmiotti and Justin Gray	1	2006–2008	Jonah Hex (vol. 2) #1–35	824	June 8, 2027	978-1799516637
Jonah Hex: All-Star Western		2011–2014	All-Star Western (vol. 3) #0–34	1064	October 28, 2025	978-1799506409

=== Justice League ===
Title	#	Years covered	Material collected	Pages	Pub. date	ISBN
Justice League: The Detroit Era		1984–2011	Justice League of America #233–239, 241–261, Annual #2–3, and more: JLA Classified #22–25; JSA Classified #14–16; DC Retroactive: Justice League of America – The 80's #1; Infinity Inc. #19	1040	December 12, 2017	978-1401276850
Justice League International	1	1987–1989	Justice League America #26–30, and more: Justice League #1–6, Annual #1; Justice League International #7–25, Annual #2–3; Justice League Europe #1–6; Suicide Squad #13	1080	October 17, 2017	978-1401273866
Justice League International	2	1989–1991	Justice League America #31–50, Annual #4, and more: Justice League Europe #7–25, Annual #1; Justice League Quarterly #1; Justice League International Special #1	1192	November 24, 2020	978-1779502964
Justice League International	3	1991–2011	Justice League America #51–60, Annual #5, and more: Secret Origins #33–35; Green Lantern (vol. 3) #18; Justice League Quarterly #2–5; JLA 80-Page Giant #1; Formerly Known as the Justice League #1–6; JLA: Classified #4–9; Justice League Europe #26–36, Annual #2; DC Retroactive: JLA - The '90s #1; Justice League International Special #2	1448	May 14, 2024	978-1779525642
JLA by Grant Morrison		1997–2004	JLA #1–17, 22–26, 28–31, 34, 36–41, 1,000,000, and more: JLA Secret Files & Origins #1; "Ghosts of Stone" from Secret Origins (vol. 2) #46; New Year's Evil: Prometheus #1; JLA/Wildcats #1; JLA: Earth 2; JLA Classified #1–3; DC One Million #1–4; Adventures of Superman #1,000,000; Detective Comics #1,000,000; Green Lantern #1,000,000; Martian Manhunter #1,000,000; Resurrection Man #1,000,000; Starman #1,000,000; Superman: The Man of Tomorrow #1,000,000; DC One Million 80-Page Giant	1504	November 18, 2020	978-1779504999
JLA by Mark Waid		1996-2002	JLA #18–21, #32–33, #43–58, #60, and more: Justice League: A Midsummer's Nightmare #1–3; JLA: Year One #1–12; JLA Secret Files and Origins #3; Flash & Green Lantern: The Brave & The Bold #1–6; DC Comics Presents: JLA - Heaven's Ladder #1; JLA: Year One Deluxe Edition #1; Flash/Green Lantern: The Brave & the Bold Deluxe Edition #1	1320	October 6, 2026	978-1799509257
Justice League: The New 52	1	2011–2013	Justice League (vol. 2) #0–23, and more: Aquaman #14–16; Justice League Dark #22–23; DC Comics – The New 52 FCBD Special Edition #1; Justice League of America #1–7; Trinity of Sin: The Phantom Stranger #11; Constantine #5; Trinity of Sin: Pandora #1–3	1248	June 22, 2021	978-1779510662
Justice League: The New 52	2	2013–2016	Justice League (vol. 2) #24–50, and more: Forever Evil #1–7; DC Universe: Rebirth #1; DC Sneak Peek: Justice League #1; Justice League feat. Secret Society #23.4; Justice League of America feat. Black Adam #7.4; Justice League: Darkseid War Special #1; Justice League: Darkseid War - Batman #1; Justice League: Darkseid War - The Flash #1; Justice League: Darkseid War - Green Lantern #1; Justice League: Darkseid War - Lex Luthor #1; Justice League: Darkseid War - Shazam! #1; Justice League: Darkseid War - Superman #1	1224	July 5, 2022	978-1779515582
Justice League: The Darkseid War Saga		2015–2016	Justice League (vol. 2) #40–50, and more: Justice League: The Darkseid War Special #1; Divergence #1; Justice League: The Darkseid War – Batman #1; Justice League: The Darkseid War – The Flash #1; Justice League: The Darkseid War – Green Lantern #1; Justice League: The Darkseid War – Lex Luthor #1; Justice League: The Darkseid War – Shazam! #1; Justice League: The Darkseid War – Superman #1	512	October 17, 2017	978-1401274023
Justice League by Scott Snyder and James Tynion IV	1	2018–2019	Justice League (vol. 4) #1–18, Annual #1, and more: * Aquaman #41–42; Titans #28; Justice League: No Justice #1–4; Justice League/Aquaman: Drowned Earth Special #1; Aquaman/Justice League: Drowned Earth Special #1; DC Nation #0	776	April 8, 2025	978-1799501053
Justice League by Scott Snyder and James Tynion IV	2	2019–2020	Justice League (vol. 4) #19-39, and more: The Batman Who Laughs #1-7; The Batman Who Laughs: The Grim Knight #1; DC: Year of the Villain Special #1; Year of the Villain: Hell Arisen #1-4	896	October 28, 2025	978-1799506430

=== Justice League Dark ===
Title	Years covered	Material collected	Pages	Pub. date	ISBN
Justice League Dark: The New 52	2011–2014	Justice League Dark #0–40, Annual #1–2, Futures End #1, and more: I...Vampire #7–8; Justice League (vol. 2) #22–23; Justice League of America #6–7; Trinity of Sin: The Phantom Stranger #11, 14–17; Constantine #5, 9–12; Trinity of Sin: Pandora #1-3, 6–9	1640	October 12, 2021	978-1779513137
Justice League Dark: Rebirth	2018–2022	Justice League Dark (vol. 2) #1–29, Annual #1, 2021 Annual, and more: Justice League Dark/Wonder Woman: The Witching Hour #1; Aquaman (vol. 8) #66; Black Adam: Endless Winter Special #1; The Flash #767, 777–779; Justice League (vol. 4) #58, 72–74, backup stories from #59–71; Justice League: Endless Winter #1–2; Superman: Endless Winter Special #1; Teen Titans: Endless Winter Special #1; Wonder Woman (vol. 5) #56–57; Wonder Woman/Justice League Dark: The Witching Hour #1; Future State: Justice League #1–2; Secrets of Sinister House #1	1464	April 16, 2024	978-1779525888

=== Justice Society ===
Title	#	Years covered	Material collected	Pages	Pub. date	ISBN
JSA	1	1999–2004	JSA #1–25, and more: JSA Secret Files and Origins #1; JSA: Our Worlds at War #1; JLA/JSA: Virtue and Vice; JSA All-Stars #1–8; JLA/JSA Secret Files and Origins #1; JSA Returns: All-Star Comics #1–2; JSA Returns: All-American Comics #1; JSA Returns: Adventure Comics #1; JSA Returns: National Comics #1; JSA Returns: Sensation Comics #1; JSA Returns: Smash Comics #1; JSA Returns: Star-Spangled Comics #1; JSA Returns: Thrilling Comics #1	1224	May 20, 2014	978-1401247614
JSA	2	1999–2005	JSA #26–75, Annual #1, and more: JSA Secret Files and Origins #2; Hawkman #23–25	1408	December 2, 2014	978-1401251383
JSA	3	2005–2009	JSA #76–87, and more: Justice Society of America (vol. 3) #1–28, Annual #1; Justice League of America (vol. 2) #8–10; Justice Society of America: Kingdom Come Special – Superman #1; Justice Society of America: Kingdom Come Special – Magog #1; Justice Society of America: Kingdom Come Special – The Kingdom #1	1248	June 30, 2015	978-1401255305

=== Kamandi ===
Title	Years covered	Material collected	Pages	Pub. date	ISBN
Kamandi, the Last Boy on Earth by Jack Kirby	1972–1976	Kamandi, the Last Boy on Earth #1–40	896	March 13, 2018	978-1401274696
Kamandi, the Last Boy on Earth by Jack Kirby	1972–1976	Kamandi, the Last Boy on Earth #1–40	896	August 4, 2026	978-1799508786

=== Legion of Super-Heroes ===
Title	#	Years covered	Material collected	Pages	Pub. date	ISBN
Legion of Super-Heroes: The Great Darkness Saga		1982–1984	Legion of Super-Heroes (vol. 2) #284–313, Annual #1–2, and more: DC Comics Presents #43, 59; World's Finest Comics #283–284; The Brave and the Bold #198; The New Adventures of Superboy #50 stories from: The Best of DC #24; DC Sampler #1	1200	September 14, 2027	978-1799516651
Legion of Super-Heroes: Five Years Later	1	1989–1993	Legion of Super-Heroes (vol. 4) #1–39, Annual #1–3, and more: Adventures of Superman #478; Who's Who in the DC Universe #1–11, 13–14, 16; Timber Wolf #1–5	1456	September 29, 2020	978-1779503138
Legion of Super-Heroes: Five Years Later	1	1989–1993	Legion of Super-Heroes (vol. 4) #1–39, Annual #1–3, and more: Adventures of Superman #478; Who's Who in the DC Universe #1–11, 13–14, 16; Timber Wolf #1–5	1456	April 15, 2025	9781-799501114
Legion of Super-Heroes: Five Years Later	2	1993–1994	Legion of Super-Heroes (vol. 4) #40–61, Annual #4–5, and more: L.E.G.I.O.N. #69–70; Legionnaires #1–18, Annual #1; Valor #20–23; Who's Who Update 1993 #1	1328	June 7, 2022	978-1779515575
Legion of Super-Heroes: Five Years Later	2	1993–1994	Legion of Super-Heroes (vol. 4) #40–61, Annual #4–5, and more: L.E.G.I.O.N. #69–70; Legionnaires #1–18, Annual #1; Valor #20–23; Who's Who Update 1993 #1	1328	April 7, 2026	978-1799507840
Legion of Super-Heroes by Mark Waid and Barry Kitson		2004–2008	Legion of Super-Heroes (vol. 5) #1–15; Supergirl and the Legion of Super-Heroes #16–36; Teen Titans/The Legion Special #1; The Brave and the Bold (vol. 3) #1–6	1184	December 8, 2026	978-1799509752

=== Nightwing ===
Title	#	Years covered	Material collected	Pages	Pub. date	ISBN
Nightwing: The Prince of Gotham		2011–2014	Nightwing (vol. 3) #0–30, Annual #1, and more: Batman (vol. 2) #17; "Another Saturday Night" from Young Romance: The New 52 Valentine's Day Special #1; "The Long Year" from Secret Origins (vol. 3) #1	832	December 14, 2020	978-1779507006
Nightwing: The Prince of Gotham		2011–2014	Nightwing (vol. 3) #0–30, Annual #1, and more: Batman (vol. 2) #17; "Another Saturday Night" from Young Romance: The New 52 Valentine's Day Special #1; "The Long Year" from Secret Origins (vol. 3) #1	832	May 6, 2025	978-1799501312
Grayson: The Superspy		2014–2016	Grayson #1–20, Annual #1–3, and more: Grayson: Futures End #1; "The Candidate" from Secret Origins (vol. 3) #8; Robin War #1–2; Nightwing: Rebirth #1	792	October 24, 2017	978-1401274160
Grayson: The Superspy		2014–2016	Grayson #1–20, Annual #1–3, and more: Grayson: Futures End #1; "The Candidate" from Secret Origins (vol. 3) #8; Robin War #1–2; Nightwing: Rebirth #1	792	August 27, 2019	978-1401295059
Grayson: The Superspy		2014–2016	Grayson #1–20, Annual #1–3, and more: Grayson: Futures End #1; "The Candidate" from Secret Origins (vol. 3) #8; Robin War #1–2; Nightwing: Rebirth #1	792	November 15, 2022	978-1779517326
Nightwing: Rebirth		2016–2018	Nightwing (vol. 4) #1–49, Annual #1, and more: Nightwing: Rebirth #1 (2016); Batgirl #14–17 and stories from #25 (2016); Batman #7–8 (2016); Detective Comics #941-942 (2016); Green Arrow #32 (2016); Red Hood and the Outlaws Annual #1 (2017); Suicide Squad #26 (2016); Teen Titans #12 (2016); Batman: Prelude to the Wedding: Nightwing Vs. Hush #1 (2018); DC Rebirth Holiday Special #1 (2017); Robin 80th Anniversary 100-Page Super Spectacular #1 (2020)	1496	April 22, 2025	978-1799501169
Nightwing by Tom Taylor	1	2021–2023	Nightwing (vol. 4) #78–96, and more: Batman: Urban Legends #10 (2021); Nightwing Annual #1 (2021); Superman: Son of Kal-El #9 (2021)	752	July 22, 2025	978-1799502197
Nightwing by Tom Taylor	2	2023-2024	Nightwing (vol. 4) #97-100, A-Stories from 101-104, 105, A-Stories from 106-108, 109-110, A-Stories from 111-113, 114-118, Annual 2022 #1	600	July 7, 2026	978-1799508502

=== Orion ===
Title	Years covered	Material collected	Pages	Pub. date	ISBN
Orion by Walter Simonson	1997–2002, 2008	Orion #1–25, and more: Showcase '94 #1; DC Universe Holiday Bash #1; Jack Kirby's Fourth World #9–11, 13; New Gods Secret Files & Origins #1; Secret Origins of Super-Villains 80-Page Giant #1; Legends of the DC Universe 80-Page Giant #1; "A Tale of Desaad!" from Tales of the New Gods; "The Origin of Desaad" from Countdown #24	688	April 14, 2015	978-1401255350
Orion by Walter Simonson	1997–2002, 2008	Orion #1–25, and more: Showcase '94 #1; DC Universe Holiday Bash #1; Jack Kirby's Fourth World #9–11, 13; New Gods Secret Files & Origins #1; Secret Origins of Super-Villains 80-Page Giant #1; Legends of the DC Universe 80-Page Giant #1; "A Tale of Desaad!" from Tales of the New Gods; "The Origin of Desaad" from Countdown #24	752	May 27, 2027	978-1799516590

=== Planetary ===
Title	Years covered	Material collected	Pages	Pub. date	ISBN
The Planetary	1999–2009	Planetary #1–27, and more: Planetary/Batman: Night on Earth; Planetary/JLA: Terra Occulta; Planetary/The Authority: Ruling the World	864	January 28, 2014	978-1401242381

=== Power Girl ===
Title	Years covered	Material collected	Pages	Pub. date	ISBN
Power Girl: New Beginnings and Old Friends	2005–2011	Power Girl (Vol. 2) #1–27 and more: JSA: Classified #1–4; Supergirl (Vol. 5) #12; Terra #1–4; Wonder Woman (Vol. 3) #600	880	August 4, 2026	978-1799508724

=== The Question ===
Title	#	Years covered	Material collected	Pages	Pub. date	ISBN
The Question by Dennis O'Neil & Denys Cowan	1	1987–1989	The Question #1–27, Annual #1, and more: Green Arrow Annual #1; Detective Comics Annual #1	952	June 28, 2022	978-1779515476
The Question by Dennis O'Neil & Denys Cowan	2	1989–1997	The Question #28–36, Annual #2, and more: Azrael Plus #1; Green Arrow Annual #2–3; Question Quarterly #1–5; "Homecoming" from Showcase '95 #3; The Brave and the Bold #1–6; The Question Returns #1	888	February 6, 2024	978-1779523044

=== Red Hood ===
Title	#	Years covered	Material collected	Pages	Pub. date	ISBN
Red Hood and the Outlaws: The New 52	1	2011–2014	Red Hood and the Outlaws #0–27, Annual #1, and more: Teen Titans (vol. 4) #16; Batman (vol. 2) #17	736	October 16, 2018	978-1401284664
Red Hood and the Outlaws: The New 52	1	2011–2014	Red Hood and the Outlaws #0–27, Annual #1, and more: Teen Titans (vol. 4) #16; Batman (vol. 2) #17	736	May 13, 2025	978-1799501398
Red Hood and the Outlaws: The New 52	2	2013-2016	Red Hood and the Outlaws #28-40, Annual #2, and more: Red Hood and the Outlaws: Futures End #1; DC Universe Presents #17-18; Red Hood/Arsenal Sneak Peek #1; Red Hood/Arsenal #1-13; stories from Secret Origins (vol. 3) #2, 5	744	July 20, 2027	978-1799516453

=== Red Lanterns ===
Title	Years covered	Material collected	Pages	Pub. date	ISBN
Red Lanterns: The New 52	2011–2015	Red Lanterns #0–40, Annual #1, and more: Stormwatch #9; Supergirl #31; Green Lantern Annual #2; Red Lanterns: Futures End #1	1088	June 10, 2025	978-1799501763

=== Secret Six ===
Title	#	Years covered	Material collected	Pages	Pub. date	ISBN
Secret Six by Gail Simone	1	2005–2010	Secret Six (vol. 2) #1–6, (vol. 3) #1–16, and more: Villains United #1–6; Villains United: Infinite Crisis Special #1; Birds of Prey #104–109; "The Origin of Catman" from 52 #28; Countdown #22	920	June 11, 2024	978-1779525956
Secret Six by Gail Simone	2	2010-2016	Secret Six (vol. 3) #17-36, (vol. 4) #1-14, and more: Suicide Squad #67; Action Comics #897; Doom Patrol #19; Material from Convergence: Wonder Woman #2	880	November 4, 2025	978-1799503194

=== Seven Soldiers of Victory ===
Title	Years covered	Material collected	Pages	Pub. date	ISBN
Seven Soldiers by Grant Morrison	2005–2006	Seven Soldiers #0–1, and more: Seven Soldiers: Shining Knight #1–4; Seven Soldiers: Guardian #1–4; Seven Soldiers: Zatanna #1–4; Seven Soldiers: Klarion the Witch Boy #1–4; Seven Soldiers: Mister Miracle #1–4; Seven Soldiers: Bulleteer #1–4; Seven Soldiers: Frankenstein #1–4	792	August 21, 2018	978-1401281519

=== Shade, the Changing Man ===
Title	#	Years covered	Material collected	Pages	Pub. date	ISBN
Shade the Changing Man by Peter Milligan	1	1990–1993	Shade, The Changing Man #1–37	992	July 15, 2025	978-1799500308
Shade the Changing Man by Peter Milligan	2	1993-1996	Shade, The Changing Man #38–70, and more: Vertigo Jam #1; Vertigo X Preview #1	992	February 10, 2026	978-1799510529

=== The Spectre ===
Title	#	Years covered	Material collected	Pages	Pub. date	ISBN
Spectre: The Wrath of the Spectre		1966–1988	The Spectre (vol.1) #1–10, and more: Showcase #60–61, 64; The Brave and the Bold #72, 75, 116, 180, 199; Adventure Comics #431–440; DC Comics Presents #29; Ghosts #97–99	680	September 1, 2020	978-1779502933
Spectre: The Wrath of the Spectre		1966–1988	The Spectre (vol.1) #1–10, and more: Showcase #60–61, 64; The Brave and the Bold #72, 75, 116, 180, 199; Adventure Comics #431–440; DC Comics Presents #29; Ghosts #97–99	680	June 3, 2025	978-1799501671
The Spectre by John Ostrander and Tom Mandrake	1	1992–1995	The Spectre (vol. 3) #0-31, and more: Material from Who's Who: The Definitive Directory of the DC Universe #21	800	October 21, 2025	978-1799504887
The Spectre by John Ostrander and Tom Mandrake	2	1987-1998	The Spectre (vol. 3) #32-62,Annual #1 and more: Who's Who in the DC Universe #8; Who's Who: The Definitive Directory of the DC Universe #21; Showcase '95 #8; Who's Who Update 1987 #5	888	October 13, 2026	978-1799509240

=== Starman ===
Title	#	Years covered	Material collected	Pages	Pub. date	ISBN
Starman (Standard sized - 6.99" x 1.09" x 10.49")	1	1994–1996	Starman (vol. 2) #0–16	448	June 10, 2008	978-1401216993
Starman (Standard sized - 6.99" x 1.09" x 10.49")	2	1996–1997	Starman (vol. 2) #17–29, and more: Starman Annual (vol. 2) #1; "Incident in an Old Haunt" from Showcase '95 #12; "Day & Night, Night & Bright" from Showcase '96 #4–5	416	March 3, 2009	978-1401221942
Starman (Standard sized - 6.99" x 1.09" x 10.49")	3	1997–1998	Starman (vol. 2) #30–38, and more: Starman Annual (vol. 2) #2; Starman Secret Files and Origins #1; The Shade #1–4	432	June 23, 2009	978-1401222840
Starman (Standard sized - 6.99" x 1.09" x 10.49")	4	1998	Starman (vol. 2) #39–46, and more: Starman 80-Page Giant #1; The Power of Shazam! #35–36; Starman: The Mist #1; Batman/Hellboy/Starman #1–2	432	February 23, 2010	978-1401225964
Starman (Standard sized - 6.99" x 1.09" x 10.49")	5	1998–1999	Starman (vol. 2) #47–60, 1,000,000, and more: All-Star Comics 80-Page Giant #1; JSA: All Stars #4; Stars and S.T.R.I.P.E. #0	464	October 12, 2010	978-1401228897
Starman (Standard sized - 6.99" x 1.09" x 10.49")	6	2000–2001, 2010	Starman (vol. 2) #61–81	544	January 25, 2011	978-1401230449

=== Suicide Squad ===
Title	#	Years covered	Material collected	Pages	Pub. date	ISBN
Suicide Squad by John Ostrander	1	1986–1988	Suicide Squad (vol. 1) #1–18, and more: Checkmate #1, 8; Manhunter #1; Justice League International #13; Secret Origins #14, 28; Who's Who #14; Detective Comics #582; The Doom Patrol and Suicide Squad Special #1; Who's Who: The Definitive Directory of the DC Universe #3–8, 11–12, 15–18, 20–23, 25; The New Teen Titans #31; The Fury of Firestorm #62-64; Firestorm: The Nuclear Man Annual #5; Who's Who Update 1987 #1, 3–5; Legends #1–6; Millennium #4; Who's Who Update 1988 #1–4	1008	May 20, 2025	978-1799501411
Suicide Squad by John Ostrander	2	1988-1989	Suicide Squad (vol. 1) #19–39, Annual (1988) #1 and more: Deadshot #1-4; Firestorm, the Nuclear Man #82; Secret Origins (1986) #37; Checkmate #15-18; Manhunter #6-7, 14; Captain Atom #30; Justice League America #27; Who’s Who: The Definitive Directory of the DC Universe #4, #6, and #18; Who’s Who Update ’88 #1-3; Who’s Who in the DC Universe ’92 #14 and #16; The Flash (Vol 2) #12; Materials from Invasion! #1-3	1008	August 4, 2026	978-1799508021
Suicide Squad by John Ostrander	3	1990–2010	Suicide Squad (vol. 1) #40–67, and more: Suicide Squad: Raise the Flag #1–8; Suicide Squad: War Crimes Special #1; Secret Six (vol. 3) #15, 17–18, 23; story from The Batman Chronicles #5; pages from War of the Gods #3	1104	June 8, 2027	978-1799516675
Suicide Squad: The New 52		2011–2014	Suicide Squad (vol. 4) #0–30, and more: Resurrection Man #9; Detective Comics #23.2; Justice League of America #7.1; Suicide Squad: Amanda Waller #1	816	April 29, 2025	978-1799501237

=== Super Sons ===
Title	Years covered	Material collected	Pages	Pub. date	ISBN
Super Sons	2017–2018	Super Sons #1–16, Annual #1, and more: Super Sons/Dynomutt Special #1; Superman (vol. 4) #10–11, 37–38; Teen Titans (vol. 6) #15; Material from DC Rebirth Holiday Special #1	608	December 24, 2018	978-1401285579
Super Sons	2017–2019	Additionally reprints: Adventures of the Super Sons #1–12	888	November 24, 2020	978-1779506665
Super Sons	2017–2021	Additionally reprints: Challenge of the Super Sons #1–7; "My Best Friend" from Robin 80th Anniversary 100-Page Super Spectacular #1	1056	October 31, 2023	978-1779524065 (Note: Third, "Super Duper Edition".)

=== Supergirl ===
Title	#	Years covered	Material collected	Pages	Pub. date	ISBN
Supergirl by Peter David	1	1996–1999	Supergirl (vol. 4) #1–37, 1,000,000, and more: Supergirl Plus #1; Young Justice #12–13; Resurrection Man #16–17; Showcase '96 #8; Team Superman Secret Files #1	1048	April 6, 2027	978-1799516538
Supergirl: The New 52	1	2011–2013	Supergirl (vol. 6) #0-20, and more: Superboy (vol. 5) #0, 6, Annual #1; Superman (vol. 4) #0, 6	824	July 8, 2025	978-1799502098
Supergirl: The New 52	2	2013-2015	Supergirl (vol. 6) #21-40, and more: Red Lanterns #28-34, Annual #1; Batman/Superman #16-21; Superboy (vol. 5) #25; Superman (vol. 4) #23.3 Hel, 25; Action Comics (vol. 2) #23.1, Annual #2; Supergirl: Futures End #1	968	June 23, 2026	978-1799508748

=== Superman ===
Title	#	Years covered	Material collected	Pages	Pub. date	ISBN
Superman: The Exile and Other Stories Omnibus		1988–1989	Superman (vol. 2) #23–37, and more: Adventures of Superman #445–460; Action Comics #643–646, Annual #2	912	April 17, 2018	978-1401278236
Superman: The Exile and Other Stories Omnibus		1988–1989	Superman (vol. 2) #23–37, and more: Adventures of Superman #445–460; Action Comics #643–646, Annual #2	912	November 26, 2024	978-1779529527
Superman: Brainiac Reborn		1989-1996	Superman (vol. 2) #38–48, and more: Action Comics #647–658; Adventures of Superman #461–471, Annual #2; L.E.G.I.O.N. Annual #1; Lex Luthor: The Unauthorized Biography #1; Superman Special #1; Superman: Under a Yellow Sun #1	1144	June 9, 2026	978-1799508229
Superman: The Triangle Era	1	1990–1992	Superman (vol. 2) #49–63, and more: Adventures of Superman #472–486; Action Comics #659–673; Superman: The Man of Steel #1–8; "Starman" #28	1384	September 3, 2024	978-1779528162
Superman: The Triangle Era	2	1992–1993	Superman (vol. 2) #64-77, and more: Adventures of Superman #487-499; Action Comics #674-686; Superman: The Man of Steel #9-21; Justice League America #69-70; Superman: Legacy of Superman #1; Supergirl / Team Luthor Special #1; Newstime: The Life and Death of Superman #1	1456	October 4, 2025	978-1799502777
Superman: The Triangle Era	3	1993–1994	Superman (vol. 2) #78–88, Annual #5, and more: Adventures of Superman #500–510, Annual #5; Action Comics #687–697, Annual #5; Superman: The Man of Steel #22–32, Annual #2; Green Lantern (vol. 3) #46; Superman/Doomsday: Hunter/Prey #1-3	1520	August 11, 2026	978-1799508762
Superman: The Death and Return of Superman Omnibus		1992–1993	Superman (vol. 2) #73–83, and more: Action Comics #683–692; Adventures of Superman #496–505; Superman: The Man of Steel #17–26; Justice League America #69; Green Lantern (vol. 3) #46	784	September 12, 2007	978-1401215507
Superman: The Death and Return of Superman Omnibus		1992–1993	Additionally reprints: Superman: The Legacy of Superman #1	1124	March 26, 2013	978-1401238643
Superman: The Death and Return of Superman Omnibus		1992–1993	Additionally reprints: Action Comics Annual #5; Adventures of Superman Annual #5; Justice League America #70; Superman: The Man of Steel Annual #2; Superman Annual (vol. 2) #5; Supergirl and Team Luthor #1; Newstime: The Life and Death of the Man of Steel #1	1408	April 16, 2019	978-1401291075 (Note: Third, expanded edition.)
Superman: The Death and Return of Superman Omnibus		1992–1993	Additionally reprints: Action Comics Annual #5; Adventures of Superman Annual #5; Justice League America #70; Superman: The Man of Steel Annual #2; Superman Annual (vol. 2) #5; Supergirl and Team Luthor #1; Newstime: The Life and Death of the Man of Steel #1	1408	May 31, 2022	978-1779515469 (Note: Fourth edition.)
Superman: Our Worlds at War	1 (Note: subtitled Prelude to War!)	1999-2001	Superman (vol. 2) #151-154, 159, 165, 170-171, and more: Adventures of Superman #576, 586, 592-593; Action Comics #763, 777, 779-780; Superman: The Man of Steel #98, 109, 114-115; Superboy (vol. 4) #89; Wonder Woman (vol. 2) #171; Superman Y2K #1; Superman: Lex 2000 #1; Superman: Metropolis Secret Files #1; Superman: Our Worlds at War Secret Files and Origins; Young Justice: Our Worlds at War #1; Batman: Our Worlds at War #1; Green Lantern: Our Worlds at War #1	816	November 11, 2025	978-1799503217
Superman: Our Worlds at War	2 (Note: subtitled "All Out War!")	2001-2010	Superman (vol. 2) #172-175, and more: Adventures of Superman #594-596; Action Comics #781-783; Superman: The Man of Steel #116-118; Batman #593-594; Superboy (vol. 4) #90-91; Wonder Woman (vol. 2) #172-173; Impulse #77; Supergirl (vol. 4) #60-61; Young Justice #35-36; Superman/Batman #68-71; Harley Quinn: Our Worlds at War #1; Wonder Woman: Our Worlds at War #1; World's Finest Comics: Our Worlds at War #1; Flash: Our Worlds at War #1; JLA: Our Worlds at War #1; JSA: Our Worlds at War #1; Nightwing: Our Worlds at War #1	1008	November 24, 2026	978-1799509585
Superman: New Krypton Saga	1	2008-2009	Superman (vol. 2) #677-685, Annual #14, and more: Action Comics #866-879; Supergirl (vol. 5) #35-42, Annual #1; Superman: New Krypton Special #1; Superman: World of New Krypton #1-3; World of New Krypton Special #1; Superman's Pal Jimmy Olsen Special #1; Adventure Comics Special Featuring the Guardian #1; Stories from "Action Comics Annual" #10	992	February 3, 2026	978-1799507376
Superman by Grant Morrison		2011–2013	Action Comics (vol. 2) #0–18, Annual #1	672	February 23, 2021	978-1779508133
Superman by Peter J. Tomasi & Patrick Gleason		2016–2018	Superman (vol. 4) #1–25, 27–28, 33–39, 42–45, Annual #1, and more: Superman: Rebirth #1; Teen Titans #15; Super Sons #11–12; Action Comics #975–976; "Never-Ending Battle" from Action Comics #1000	1128	May 25, 2021	978-1779509253
Superman: Action Comics by Dan Jurgens	1	2016-2018	Action Comics #957-976, and more: Superman: Lois and Clark #1-8; Superman #18-19; Justice League #52; Convergence: Superman #1-2; Superman: Rebirth #1; DC Universe: Rebirth #1	848	August 5, 2025	978-1799505112
Superman: Action Comics by Dan Jurgens	2	2017-2023	Action Comics #977-1000, #1051-1057, and more: Action Comics Special #1; The Death of Superman 30th Anniversary Special #1	704	July 14, 2026	978-1799508533
Superman by Phillip Kennedy Johnson	1	2021–2022	Action Comics #1029–1049, Annual 2022, and more: Superman (vol. 5) #29–32; Infinite Frontier #0; Superman and the Authority #1–4; Superman: Son of Kal-El #16–18; Batman/Superman: Authority Special #1; Superman: Warworld Apocalypse #1	896	July 1, 2025	978-1799502029
Superman by Phillip Kennedy Johnson	2	2022-2026	Action Comics #1047–1060, Annual 2023, and more: Superman: Kal-El Returns Special *1; Superman: Son of Kal-El #16–18; Knight Terrors: Action Comics #1-2; Adventures of Superman: Book of El #1-12	950	February 16, 2027	978-1799516422

=== Superman/Batman ===
Title	#	Years covered	Material collected	Pages	Pub. date	ISBN
Superman & Batman Generations		1999–2004	Superman & Batman: Generations #1–4, and more: Superman & Batman: Generations II #1–4; Superman & Batman: Generations III #1–12	680	March 2, 2021	978-1779509406
Superman/Batman	1	2003–2008	Superman/Batman #1–43, Annual #1–2, and more: "When Bruce Met Clark" from Superman/Batman Secret Files & Origins 2003	1208	May 26, 2020	978-1779500298
Superman/Batman	2	2008–2011	Superman/Batman #44–87, Annual #3–5	1232	March 15, 2022	978-1779510235

=== Swamp Thing ===
Title	Years covered	Material collected	Pages	Pub. date	ISBN
Swamp Thing: Dark Genesis	1971-1982	Swamp Thing (vol.1) #1–25, (vol. 2) #1–15, Annual #1 and more: The House of Secrets #92, 140-141; The Brave and the Bold #122, 176; DC Comics Presents #8; Challengers of the Unknown #81-87; Phantom Stranger #14	1136	November 24, 2026	978-1799509059
Swamp Thing by Alan Moore	1983-1987	Swamp Thing (vol. 2) #16–64, Annual #2 and more: * DC Comics Presents #85; John Constantine, Hellblazer #1-3; Material from DC Sampler #2-3; Material from Crisis on Infinite Earths #4; The New Teen Titans (vol. 2) #18 and #22	1600	July 6, 2027	978-1799510765
Swamp Thing by Nancy A. Collins	1991–1994	Swamp Thing (vol. 2) #110–139, Annual #6–7	984	April 7, 2020	978-1401297091
Swamp Thing by Mark Millar and Phil Hester	1994–1996	Swamp Thing (vol. 2) #140–171	896	January 14, 2025	978-1779528070
Swamp Thing: The New 52	2011–2015	Swamp Thing (vol. 5) #0–40, 23.1; Annual #1–3, and more: Swamp Thing: Futures End #1; Animal Man #12, 17; Aquaman #31	1160	March 23, 2021	978-1779508140
The Swamp Thing by Ram V and Mike Perkins	2020–2022	The Swamp Thing #1–16 and more: Legend of the Swamp Thing Halloween Spectacular #1; Future State: Swamp Thing #1-2; Poison Ivy / Swamp Thing: Feral Trees #1	560	June 23, 2026	978-1799508205

=== Teen Titans ===
Title	#	Years covered	Material collected	Pages	Pub. date	ISBN
The New Teen Titans	1	1980–1982	New Teen Titans #1–20, and more: DC Comics Presents #26; Tales of the New Teen Titans #1–4	684	September 6, 2011	978-1401231088
The New Teen Titans	1	1980–1982	Additionally reprints: The Best of DC #18	688	September 5, 2017	978-1401271282
The New Teen Titans	1	1980–1982	Additionally reprints: The Best of DC #18	692	September 13, 2022	978-1779516725
The New Teen Titans	2	1982–1984	New Teen Titans #21–37, 39–40, Annual #1–2, and more: Tales of the Teen Titans #41–44, Annual #3; Batman and the Outsiders #5	736	April 24, 2012	978-1401234294
The New Teen Titans	2	1982–1984	New Teen Titans #21–40, Annual #1–2, and more: Tales of the Teen Titans #41; Batman and the Outsiders #5	640	February 27, 2018	978-1401277628
The New Teen Titans	2	1982–1984	New Teen Titans #21–40, Annual #1–2, and more: Tales of the Teen Titans #41; Batman and the Outsiders #5	640	March 24, 2026	978-1799507635
The New Teen Titans	3	1984–1989	New Teen Titans (vol. 2) #1–6, and more: New Teen Titans #38; Tales of the Teen Titans #45–50; New Titans #50–61, 66–67; Secret Origins Annual (vol. 2) #3	792	June 4, 2013	978-1401238452
The New Teen Titans	3	1984–1985	New Teen Titans (vol. 2) #1–9, and more: Tales of the Teen Titans #42–58, Annual #3	720	July 31, 2018	978-1401281106
The New Teen Titans	3	1984–1985	New Teen Titans (vol. 2) #1–9, and more: Tales of the Teen Titans #42–58, Annual #3	720	December 1, 2026	978-1799509776
The New Teen Titans	4	1985–1987	New Teen Titans (vol. 2) #10–31, Annual #1–2, and more: "Sons and Brothers" from The Omega Men #34	800	November 26, 2019	978-1401289300
The New Teen Titans	4	1985–1987	New Teen Titans (vol. 2) #10–31, Annual #1–2, and more: "Sons and Brothers" from The Omega Men #34	800	April 20, 2027	978-1799516521
The New Teen Titans	5	1987–1988	New Teen Titans (vol. 2) #32–49, Annual #3–4, and more: Tales of the Teen Titans #91; "The Secret Origin of Nightwing" from Secret Origins (vol. 2) #13, Annual #3; Infinity, Inc. #45	744	January 26, 2021	978-1779504739
The New Titans	1	1988–1991	The New Titans #50–76, Annual #5–6, and more: Secret Origins Annual #3; Batman #436–442; Hawk and Dove (Vol. 2) #11–12, Annual #1; story from Secret Origins (Vol. 2) #46	1250	August 18, 2026	978-1799508731
The New Titans	2	1990-1993	The New Titans #71-96, and more: Team Titans #1-5; Team Titans #1: Killowat #1; Team Titans #1: Mirage #1; Team Titans #1: Nightrider #1; Team Titans #1: Redwing #1; Team Titans #1: Terra #1; Deathstroke, The Terminator #14-16; Deathstroke, The Terminator Annual #1; The New Titans Annual #7-8; Titans Sell-Out Special #1; stories from Showcase ’93 #1-2	1250	May 4, 2027	978-1799516583
Teen Titans by Geoff Johns		2000–2007	Teen Titans (vol. 2) #½–26, 29–46, 50, Annual #1, and more: Teen Titans/Outsiders Secret Files and Origins 2003; Titans Secret Files and Origins #2; Teen Titans/Legion Special #1; Legends of the DC Universe Giant #2; Beast Boy #1–4; Outsiders (vol. 3) #24–25; Robin (vol. 4) #146–147; Infinite Crisis #5–6	1426	February 26, 2013	978-1401236939
Teen Titans by Geoff Johns		2000–2007	Teen Titans (vol. 2) #½–26, 29–46, 50, Annual #1, and more: Teen Titans/Outsiders Secret Files and Origins 2003; Titans Secret Files and Origins #2; Teen Titans/Legion Special #1; Legends of the DC Universe Giant #2; Beast Boy #1–4; Outsiders (vol. 3) #24–25; Robin (vol. 4) #146–147; Infinite Crisis #5–6	1440	May 31, 2022	978-1779515452
Titans by Tom Taylor		2023–2024	Titans (vol. 4) #1-15; Titans: Beast World #1-6; Nightwing (vol. 4) #101-104, 109-110	760	February 10, 2026	978-1799507383

=== Tom Strong ===
Title	#	Years covered	Material collected	Pages	Pub. date	ISBN
Tom Strong	1	1999-2005	Tom Strong #1-30; pages from Promethea #26-27	800	June 15, 2027	978-1799516545

=== Warlord ===
Title	#	Years covered	Material collected	Pages	Pub. date	ISBN
The Warlord by Mike Grell	1	1975–1980	1st Issue Special #8; The Warlord #1–36	736	December 23, 2025	978-1799505525
The Warlord by Mike Grell	2	1980-1984	The Warlord #37-71, Annual #1; DC Sampler #2; DC Special Blue Ribbon Digest #10	720	November 3, 2026	978-1799506157

=== Wonder Woman ===
Title	#	Years covered	Material collected	Pages	Pub. date	ISBN
Diana Prince – Celebrating the 60s		1968–1973	Wonder Woman (vol. 1) #178–204, and more: Superman's Girl Friend, Lois Lane #93; The Brave and the Bold #87, 105; World's Finest Comics #204	736	December 25, 2018	978-1401285296
Wonder Woman by George Pérez	1	1987–1988	Wonder Woman (vol. 2) #1–24, Annual #1	640	August 25, 2015	978-1401255473
Wonder Woman by George Pérez	1	1987–1988	Wonder Woman (vol. 2) #1–24, Annual #1	640	October 18, 2022	978-1779517258
Wonder Woman by George Pérez	2	1988–1990	Wonder Woman (vol. 2) #25–45, Annual #2	552	May 23, 2017	978-1401272388
Wonder Woman by George Pérez	2	1988–1990	Wonder Woman (vol. 2) #25–45, Annual #2	552	July 28, 2026	978-1799508519
Wonder Woman by George Pérez	3	1990–2010	Wonder Woman (vol. 2) #46–62, 168–169, and more: War of the Gods #1–4; "Valedictorian" from Wonder Woman #600	672	June 12, 2018	978-1401280390
Wonder Woman by George Pérez	3	1990–2010	Wonder Woman (vol. 2) #46–62, 168–169, and more: War of the Gods #1–4; "Valedictorian" from Wonder Woman #600	672	May 4, 2027	978-1799510604
Wonder Woman: War of the Gods		1991	War of the Gods #1–4, and more: Wonder Woman (vol. 2) #58–62; Superman: The Man of Steel #3; Hawkworld #15–16; Starman #38; L.E.G.I.O.N. '91 #31; Hawk and Dove #28; Captain Atom #56–57; Doctor Fate #32–33; The Flash (vol. 2) #55; Justice League Europe #31; Batman #470; Suicide Squad #58; The Demon #17; New Titans #81	760	May 19, 2020	978-1401295288
Wonder Woman by John Byrne		1988–1998	Wonder Woman (vol. 2) #101-136, and more: Wonder Woman (vol. 2) Annual #5-6; Stories from Action Comics (vol. 1) #600; Adventure Comics 80-Page Giant #1; Adventures of Superman #440; Sergio AragonÃ©s Destroys DC #1; Wonder Woman Secret Files & Origins #1	1016	September 2, 2025	978-1799502791
Wonder Woman by Phil Jimenez		1998–2005	Wonder Woman (vol. 2) #164–188, and more: Wonder Woman: Donna Troy #1; Wonder Woman: Our Worlds at War #1; DC Special: The Return of Donna Troy #1–4	856	February 19, 2019	978-1401288570
Wonder Woman by Phil Jimenez		1998–2005	Wonder Woman (vol. 2) #164–188, and more: Wonder Woman: Donna Troy #1; Wonder Woman: Our Worlds at War #1; DC Special: The Return of Donna Troy #1–4	856	August 12, 2025	978-1799502470
Wonder Woman by Greg Rucka		2002–2010	Wonder Woman (vol. 2) #195–226, and more: The Flash #219; Wonder Woman: The Hiketeia #1; Blackest Night: Wonder Woman #1–3	1000	May 27, 2025	978-1799501572
Wonder Woman by Gail Simone		2008–2014	Wonder Woman (vol. 3) #14–44, 600, and more: Sensation Comics featuring Wonder Woman #1	816	March 3, 2020	978-1401292492
Wonder Woman by Brian Azzarello and Cliff Chiang		2011–2014	Wonder Woman (vol. 4) #0–35, 23.2, and more: "The Secret Origin of Wonder Woman" from Secret Origins (vol. 3) #6	928	June 21, 2019	978-1401291099
Wonder Woman: Rebirth by Greg Rucka		2016-2020	Wonder Woman (vol. 5) #1–25, and more: Wonder Woman: Rebirth #1 stories from: DC Holiday Special 2017 #1; Wonder Woman 75th Anniversary Special #1; Wonder Woman (vol. 5) Annual #1; Wonder Woman (vol. 1) #750	736	September 1, 2026	978-1799509073
Wonder Woman: Rebirth: Children of the Gods		2017-2019	Wonder Woman (vol. 5) #26-81, and more: Wonder Woman: Steve Trevor #1; Titans Annual #1; Wonder Woman (vol. 5) Annual #2; Wonder Woman and the Justice League Dark: The Witching Hour #1; Justice League Dark: The Witching Hour #1; Justice League Dark and Wonder Woman: The Witching Hour #1 stories from: DC Rebirth Holiday Special #1; Wonder Woman 75th Anniversary Special #1	1000	May 4, 2027	978-1799516569

=== Young Justice ===
Title	#	Years covered	Material collected	Pages	Pub. date	ISBN
Young Justice	1	1998–2000	Young Justice #1–19, 1,000,000, and more: JLA: World Without Grown-Ups #1–2; Young Justice: The Secret #1; Young Justice Secret Files #1; Secret Origins 80-Page Giant #1; Young Justice in No Man's Land #1; Supergirl (vol. 4) #36–37; Superboy (vol. 4) #74; Young Justice: Sins of Youth #1–2; Sins of Youth Secret Files #1; Sins of Youth: JLA Jr. #1; Sins of Youth: Aquaboy/Lagoon Man #1; Sins of Youth: Batboy and Robin #1; Sins of Youth: Kid Flash/Impulse #1; Sins of Youth: Starwoman and the JSA #1; Sins of Youth: Superman Jr./Superboy Sr. #1; Sins of Youth: Wonder Girls #1; Sins of Youth: The Secret/Deadboy #1	1272	December 12, 2023	978-1779526038
Young Justice	2	2000-2003	Young Justice #20-55, and more: Robin #101; Superboy #91, #99; Impulse #78, #85; Secret Files & Origins Guide to DCU 2000 #1; Young Justice: Our Worlds at War #1; JLA/JSA Secret Files #1; Titans/Young Justice: Graduation Day #1-3	1200	January 20, 2026	978-1799506270

=== Zatanna ===
Title	Years covered	Material collected	Pages	Pub. date	ISBN
Zatanna by Paul Dini	2003-2019	Zatanna (vol. 2) #1-16, and more: Detective Comics #824, #833-834, #843-844; Zatanna: Everyday Magic; Black Canary and Zatanna: Bloodspell Graphic novel; DC Infinite Halloween Special #1; Secrets of Sinister House #1	640	May 5, 2026	978-1799508045

=== Crossover events ===
Title	Years covered	Material collected	Pages	Pub. date	ISBN
Legends	1986-1987	Legends #1-6, and more: Batman #401; Detective Comics #568; The Green Lantern Corps #207; Cosmic Boy #1-4; Justice League of America #258-261; Secret Origins #10, 14; The Fury of Firestorm #55-56; Blue Beetle #9-10; The Warlord #114-115; Superman #3; The Adventures of Superman #426; Action Comics #586	784	June 23, 2026	978-1799507826
Millennium	1988	Millennium #1-8, and more: Action Comics #596; Adventures of Superman #436-437; Batman #415; Blue Beetle #20-21; Booster Gold #24-25; Captain Atom #11; Detective Comics #582; Firestorm: The Nuclear Man #67-68; Green Lantern Corps #220-221; History of the DC Universe #1-2; Infinity, Inc. #46-47; JLA in Crisis Secret Files and Origins #1; Justice League International #9-10; Legion of Super-Heroes #42-43; Secret Origins #22-23; Suicide Squad #9; Superman #13-14; Teen Titans Spotlight #18-19; The Flash #8-9; The Outsiders #27-28; The Spectre #10-11; Who’s Who Update ‘88 #2; Wonder Woman #12-13, Annual #2; The World of Smallville #3-4; Young All-Stars #8-9.	1104	July 17, 2027	978-1401220655
Zero Hour: Crisis in Time! 25th Anniversary	1994	Zero Hour #4–0, and more: Action Comics #703; Adventures of Superman #516; Anima #7; Batman #511; Batman: Shadow of the Bat #31; Catwoman (vol. 2) #14; Damage #0, 6; Darkstars #24; Detective Comics #678; The Flash (vol. 2) #0, 94; Green Arrow (vol. 2) #90; Green Lantern (vol. 3) #0, 55; Guy Gardner, Warrior #24; Hawkman (vol. 3) #13; Justice League America #92; Justice League International (vol. 2) #68; Justice League Task Force #16; L.E.G.I.O.N. '94 #70; Legionnaires #18; Legion of Super-Heroes (vol. 3) #61; Outsiders (vol. 2) #11; Robin (vol. 4) #10; Steel (vol. 2) #8; Superboy (vol. 4) #8; Superman (vol. 2) #93; Superman: The Man of Steel #0, 37; Team Titans #24; Valor #23; "Sum: Zero" from Showcase '94 #8–10	1096	October 29, 2019	978-1401294366
Zero Hour: Crisis in Time! 25th Anniversary	1994		1096	February 27, 2024	978-1779526304
Infinite Crisis	2005–2006	Infinite Crisis #1–7, and more: Day of Vengeance #1–6, Special #1; Rann-Thanagar War #1–6, Special #1; Countdown to Infinite Crisis; OMAC Project #1–6, Special #1; Wonder Woman (vol. 2) #219; Villains United #1–6, Special #1; Infinite Crisis Secret Files and Origins 2006	1152	July 3, 2012	978-1401235024
Infinite Crisis	2005–2006	Additionally reprints: Action Comics #826, 829; Adventures of Superman #639, 642; JLA #115–119; Superman (vol. 2) #216, 219	1424	June 19, 2018	978-1401283278
Infinite Crisis	2005–2006	Additionally reprints: Action Comics #826, 829; Adventures of Superman #639, 642; JLA #115–119; Superman (vol. 2) #216, 219	1424	June 10, 2020	978-1779503442
52	2006–2007	52 #1–52	1216	November 27, 2012	978-1401235567
52	2006–2007	52 #1–52	1216	July 19, 2022	978-1779515438
Final Crisis 10th Anniversary	2008–2009	Final Crisis #1–7, and more: Batman #676–683, 701–702; Birds of Prey #118; DC Universe #0; DC Universe: The Last Will and Testament #1; Final Crisis: Legion of 3 Worlds #1–5; Final Crisis: Requiem #1; Final Crisis: Resist #1; Final Crisis: Revelations #1–5; Final Crisis: Rogues' Revenge #1–3; Final Crisis Secret Files and Origins #1; Final Crisis: Submit #1; Final Crisis: Superman Beyond #1–2; The Flash #240–241; Justice League of America (vol. 2) #21; Superman/Batman #76; Teen Titans (vol. 3) #59–60; Terror Titans #1–6	1512	October 16, 2018	978-1401285036
Final Crisis 10th Anniversary	2008–2009		1512	December 10, 2019	978-1779501400
Blackest Night 10th Anniversary	2009–2010	Blackest Night #0–8, and more: Blackest Night: Tales of the Corps #1–3; Untold Tales of Blackest Night; Green Lantern (vol. 4) #43–52; Green Lantern Corps (vol. 2) #39–47; Blackest Night: Batman #1–3; Blackest Night: Superman #1–3; Blackest Night: Wonder Woman #1–3; Blackest Night: The Flash #1–3; Blackest Night: Titans #1–3; Blackest Night: JSA #1–3; Adventure Comics (vol. 2) #4–5, 7; Starman (vol. 2) #81; The Power of Shazam! #48; Question (vol. 1) #37; The Phantom Stranger (vol. 2) #42; Catwoman (vol. 3) #83; Weird Western Tales (vol. 1) #71; Green Arrow and Black Canary #30; The Atom and Hawkman #46	1664	June 11, 2019	978-1401291198
Brightest Day	2010–2011	Brightest Day #0–24	696	August 26, 2014	978-1401245979
Brightest Day	2010–2011	Brightest Day #0–24	696	August 30, 2022	978-1779516336
Flashpoint: The 10th Anniversary	2011	Flashpoint #1–5, and more: Booster Gold #44–47; The Flash #8–12; Flashpoint: Reverse-Flash #1; Flashpoint: Abin Sur the Green Lantern #1–3; Flashpoint: Emperor Aquaman #1–3; Flashpoint: Batman - Knight of Vengeance #1–3; Flashpoint: Citizen Cold #1–3; Flashpoint: The World of Flashpoint #1–3; Flashpoint: Deadman and the Flying Graysons #1–3; Flashpoint: Deathstroke and the Curse of the Ravager #1–3; Flashpoint: Lois Lane and the Resistance #1–3; Flashpoint: The Outsider #1–3; Flashpoint: Secret Seven #1–3; Flashpoint: The Canterbury Cricket #1; Flashpoint: Wonder Woman and the Furies #1–3; Flashpoint: Kid Flash Lost #1–3; Flashpoint: Project Superman #1–3; Flashpoint: Frankenstein and the Creatures of the Unknown #1–3; Flashpoint: Green Arrow Industries #1; Flashpoint: Grodd of War #1; Flashpoint: Hal Jordan #1–3; Flashpoint: The Legion of Doom #1–3	1512	April 20, 2021	978-1779509772
DC Comics: The New 52	2011	The #1 issues from the following 2011 New 52 series: List: Action Comics, All-Star Western, Animal Man, Aquaman, Batgirl, Batman, Batman: The Dark Knight, Batman and Robin, Batwing, Batwoman, Birds of Prey, Blackhawks, Blue Beetle, Captain Atom, Catwoman, DC Universe Presents, Deathstroke, Demon Knights, Detective Comics, The Flash, Frankenstein: Agent of S.H.A.D.E., The Fury of Firestorm the Nuclear Men, Green Arrow, Green Lantern, Green Lantern Corps, Green Lantern: New Guardians, Grifter, Hawk and Dove, I...Vampire, Justice League, Justice League Dark, Justice League International, Legion Lost, Legion of Super-Heroes, Men of War, Mister Terrific, Nightwing, OMAC, Red Hood and the Outlaws, Red Lanterns, Resurrection Man, Savage Hawkman, Static Shock, Stormwatch, Suicide Squad, Superboy, Supergirl, Superman, Swamp Thing, Teen Titans, Voodoo, Wonder Woman	1216	December 13, 2011	978-1401234515
DC Comics: The New 52 Zero	2012	The #0 issues from the following 2011 New 52 series: List: Action Comics, All-Star Western, Animal Man, Aquaman, Batgirl, Batman, Batman and Robin, Batman Incorporated, Batman: The Dark Knight, Batwing, Batwoman, Birds of Prey, Blue Beetle, Captain Atom, DC Universe Presents, Deathstroke, Demon Knights, Detective Comics, Dial H, Earth 2, The Flash, Frankenstein Agent of S.H.A.D.E., The Fury of Firestorm: The Nuclear Men, G.I. Combat, Green Arrow, Green Lantern, Green Lantern Corps, Green Lantern: New Guardians, Grifter, I...Vampire, Justice League, Justice League Dark, Legion Lost, Legion of Super-Heroes, Nightwing, Phantom Stranger, The Ravagers, Red Hood and the Outlaws, Red Lanterns, Resurrection Man, The Savage Hawkman, Stormwatch, Suicide Squad, Superboy, Supergirl, Superman, Swamp Thing, Sword of Sorcery, Talon, Team 7, Teen Titans, Voodoo, Wonder Woman, World's Finest	1344	December 18, 2012	978-1401238841
DC Comics: The New 52 Villains	2013	The following issues from the 2013 New 52 series: Action Comics #23.1–23.4; Aquaman #23.1–23.2; Batman #23.1–23.4; Batman and Robin (vol. 2) #23.1–23.4; Batman: The Dark Knight #23.1–23.4; Batman/Superman #3.1; Detective Comics (vol. 2) #23.1–23.4; Earth 2 #15.1–15.2; The Flash #23.1–23.3; Green Arrow #23.1; Green Lantern #23.1–23.4; Justice League #23.1–23.4; Justice League Dark #23.1-23.2; Justice League of America #7.1–7.4; Superman #23.1–23.4; Swamp Thing #23.1; Teen Titans #23.1–23.2; Wonder Woman #23.1–23.2	1184	December 17, 2013	978-1401244965
Forever Evil	2013–2014	Forever Evil #1–7, and more: Nightwing #30; Suicide Squad #24–30; Justice League #23–29; Justice League of America #8–14; Forever Evil: Arkham War #1–6; Forever Evil: Rogues Rebellion #1–6; Forever Evil: A.R.G.U.S. #1–6; Forever Evil Aftermath: Batman vs. Bane #1	1336	February 11, 2025	978-1799500377
The New 52: Futures End – Five Years Later	2014	Futures End #1 issues from the following New 52 series: List: Aquaman, Aquaman and the Others, Batgirl, Batman, Batman and Robin, Batman/Superman, Batwing, Batwoman, Birds of Prey, Booster Gold, Catwoman, Constantine the Hellblazer, Detective Comics, Earth 2, The Flash, Grayson, Green Arrow, Green Lantern, Green Lantern Corps, Green Lantern: New Guardians, Harley Quinn, Infinity Man and the Forever People, Justice League, Justice League Dark, Justice League United, New Suicide Squad, Red Hood and the Outlaws, Red Lanterns, Sinestro, Star-Spangled War Stories Featuring G.I. Zombie, Superboy, Supergirl, Superman, Superman/Wonder Woman, Swamp Thing, Teen Titans, Trinity of Sin: Pandora, Trinity of Sin: Phantom Stranger, Wonder Woman, Worlds' Finest	912	December 21, 2014	978-1401251291
DC Universe Rebirth	2016	Rebirth #1 issues of the following 2016 DC Rebirth series: List: Aquaman, Batgirl and the Birds of Prey, Batman, Batman Beyond, Blue Beetle, Constantine the Hellblazer, Cyborg, DC Universe, Deathstroke, The Flash, Green Arrow, Green Lanterns, Hal Jordan and the Green Lantern Corps, Justice League, Nightwing, Red Hood and the Outlaws, Suicide Squad, Supergirl, Superman, Titans, Teen Titans, Wonder Woman	568	December 13, 2016	978-1401267421
DC Universe Rebirth	2016	Additionally reprints: Batwoman: Rebirth #1; DC Rebirth Holiday Special; Justice League of America: The Atom; Justice League of America: Killer Frost; Justice League of America: The Ray; Justice League of America: Vixen	792	September 19, 2017	978-1401276454
Dark Nights: Metal	2017–2018	Dark Nights: Metal #1–6, and more: The Flash (vol. 5) #33; Hal Jordan and the Green Lantern Corps #32; Justice League (vol. 3) #32–33; Hawkman: Found #1; Teen Titans #12; Nightwing (vol. 5) #17, 29; Suicide Squad (vol. 5) #26; Green Arrow (vol. 6) #32; Batman: Lost #1; Batman: The Red Death #1; Batman: The Devastator #1; Batman: The Merciless #1; Batman: The Murder Machine #1; Batman: The Drowned #1; Batman: The Dawnbreaker #1; The Batman Who Laughs #1; Dark Knights Rising: The Wild Hunt #1; Dark Days: The Forge #1; Dark Days: The Casting #1; Final Crisis #6–7; Batman: The Return of Bruce Wayne #1; Batman (vol. 2) #38–39	744	January 10, 2023	978-1779517036
Dark Nights: Death Metal	2020–2021	Dark Nights: Death Metal #1–7, and more: Dark Nights: Death Metal Guidebook #1; Dark Nights: Death Metal Infinite Hour Exxxtreme! #1; Dark Nights: Death Metal Legends of the Dark Knight #1; Dark Nights: Death Metal Multiverse's End #1; Dark Nights: Death Metal Rise of the New God #1; Dark Nights: Death Metal Robin King #1, Dark Nights: Death Metal The Last 52: War of the Multiverses #1; Dark Nights: Death Metal The Multiverse Who Laughs #1; Dark Nights: Death Metal The Secret Origin #1; Dark Nights: Death Metal Trinity Crisis #1; Justice League (vol. 3) #53–57	936	January 2, 2024	978-1779523075
Dark Crisis	2022-2023	Dark Crisis #1–7, and more: Justice League #75; Dark Crisis #0 FCBD Special Edition; The Flash #783-786; Justice League: Road to Dark Crisis #1; I Am Batman #15; Dark Crisis: Young Justice #1-6; Dark Crisis: Worlds Without a Justice League - Superman #1; Dark Crisis: Worlds Without a Justice League - Green Lantern #1; Dark Crisis: Worlds Without a Justice League - Wonder Woman #1; Dark Crisis: Worlds Without a Justice League - Green Arrow #1; Dark Crisis: Worlds Without a Justice League - Batman #1; Dark Crisis: The Deadly Green #1; Dark Crisis: Warzone #1; Dark Crisis: The Dark Army #1; Dark Crisis: Big Bang #1	992	June 16, 2026	978-1799508243
Knight Terrors	2023	Knight Terrors #1–4, and more: Dawn of DC Knight Terrors 2023 FCBD Special Edition #1; Knight Terrors: First Blood #1; Knight Terrors: Night's End #1; Knight Terrors: Action Comics #1–2; Knight Terrors: Batman #1–2; Knight Terrors: Black Adam #1–2; Knight Terrors: Catwoman #1–2; Knight Terrors: Detective Comics #1–2; Knight Terrors: Green Lantern #1–2; Knight Terrors: Harley Quinn #1–2; Knight Terrors: Nightwing #1–2; Knight Terrors: Poison Ivy #1–2; Knight Terrors: Robin #1–2; Knight Terrors: Shazam! #1–2; Knight Terrors: Superman #1–2; Knight Terrors: The Flash #1–2; Knight Terrors: The Joker #1–2; Knight Terrors: Titans #1–2; Knight Terrors: Wonder Woman #1–2; Knight Terrors: Ravager #1–2; Knight Terrors: Zatanna #1–2; Knight Terrors: Punchline #1–2; Knight Terrors: Angel Breaker #1–2	1464	May 13, 2025	978-1799501374
Absolute Power	2024	Absolute Power #1–4, and more: Absolute Power 2024 FCBD Special Edition #1; Absolute Power: Ground Zero #1; Absolute Power: Origins #1-3; Absolute Power: Super Son #1; Absolute Power: Task Force VII #1-7; Batman (vol. 3) #148, #151-152; Green Arrow (vol. 7) #12-17; Suicide Squad: Dream Team #1-4; Superman (vol. 6) #16-18; The Flash (vol. 6) #10; Titans (vol. 4) #12; Wonder Woman (vol. 6) #10-12 stories from: Batman (vol. 3) #150; Green Lantern (vol. 7) #13-15; Wonder Woman (vol. 6) #13	1232	September 8, 2026	978-1799509097

=== Alternate continuities ===
Title	#	Years covered	Material collected	Pages	Pub. date	ISBN
Elseworlds: Batman	1	1989-1995	Elseworlds issues: Batman (vol. 1) Annual #18; Detective Comics (vol. 1) Annual #7; Batman: Gotham by Gaslight #1; Batman: Holy Terror #1; Batman: Legends of the Dark Knight Annual #4; Batman & Dracula: Red Rain #1; Batman: Master of the Future #1; Robin (vol. 2) Annual #3; Robin 3000 #1-2; Batman: The Blue, the Grey, and the Bat #1; Batman: Shadow of the Bat Annual #2; Batman/Houdini: The Devil's Workshop #1; Catwoman (vol. 2) Annual #1; Batman/Dark Joker: The Wild #1; Batman: In Darkest Knight #1; Batman: Castle of the Bat #1; Batman: Bloodstorm #1; Batman: Knight Gallery #1; Batman: Man-Bat #1-3; Batman: Brotherhood of the Bat #1	1376	March 17, 2026	978-1799502746
Elseworlds: Justice League	1	1993-1996	Elseworlds issues: Justice League America Annual #8, 10; Justice League International Annual (vol. 2) #5; Guy Gardner: Warrior Annual #2; Green Lantern Annual (vol. 3) #3, 5; Aquaman Annual (vol. 5) #2; The Flash Annual (vol. 2) #7; Wonder Woman Annual (vol. 2) #5; Kamandi: At Earth's End #1-6; Kingdom Come #1-4; League of Justice #1-2; Superman/Batman Doom Link Kenner Custom Comic; The Golden Age #1-4	1144	May 19, 2026	978-1799503170
Elseworlds: Superman	1	1993-1998	Elseworlds issues: Superman: Speeding Bullets #1; Superman: The Man of Steel Annual #3, #4; Superman Annual #6, #8; Steel Annual #1; Superboy Annual #1, #3; Adventures of Superman Annual #6, #8; Action Comics Annual #6, #8; Superman: Kal #1; Superman: At Earth's End #1; Supergirl Annual #1; Superman/Wonder Woman: Whom Gods Destroy #1-4; Superman's Metropolis #1; Superman: Distant Fire #1; Superman: The Dark Side #1-3	1240	April 7, 2026	978-1799502456
Elseworlds: Superman	2	1998-2016	Elseworlds issues: Superman: Last Stand on Krypton #1; Superman: Last Son of Earth #1-2; Superman: Red Son #1-3; Superman: A Nation Divided #1; Superman: True Brit #1; Superman, Inc. #1; Superman: The Last Family of Krypton #1-3; The Superman Monster #1; Superman: War of the Worlds #1; Superboy's Legion #1-2; Supergirl: Wings #1; DCU Infinite Holiday Special #1; Superman: Rebirth #1; Superman (vol. 4) #1-6	1080	March 23, 2027	978-1799516439
The Batman Adventures		1992–1995	The Batman Adventures #1–36, and more: The Batman Adventures Annual #1–2; The Batman Adventures Holiday Special #1; The Batman Adventures: Mad Love #1; Stories from Batman: Black & White Omnibus	1192	September 5, 2023	978-1779521194
The Batman and Robin Adventures		1992–1998	The Batman & Robin Adventures #1–25, and more: The Batman & Robin Adventures Annual #1–2; The Batman Adventures: The Lost Years #1–5; The Batman & Robin Adventures: Sub-Zero #1	904	July 9, 2024	978-1779527370
Batman: Gotham Adventures Omnibus	1	1997–2001	Batman: Gotham Adventures #1–42, and more: Batman: Gotham Knights #14; Superman Adventures #25; Adventures in the DC Universe #3; The Batgirl Adventures #1; Harley & Ivy: Love on the Lam #1	1168	October 20, 2026	978-1799509233
Batman: The Arkham Saga		2009–2016	Batman: Arkham Asylum – The Road to Arkham #1, and more: Batman: Arkham City #1–5; Batman: Arkham City Digital Chapters #1–5; Batman: Arkham Knight #1–12, Annual #1; Batman: Arkham Knight – Batgirl Begins #1; Batman: Arkham Knight – Batgirl & Harley Quinn #1; Batman: Arkham Knight Genesis #1–6; Batman: Arkham Knight – Robin Special #1; Batman: Arkham Origins #1–12; Batman: Arkham Unhinged #1–20; Batman: Arkham Unhinged – End Game #1	1648	September 18, 2018	978-1401284329
Batman '66		2013–2016	Batman '66 #1–30, and more: Batman '66: The Lost Episode #1	900	August 14, 2018	978-1401283285
DC One Million		1998	DC One Million #1–4, and more: DC One Million 80-Page Giant #1; Superman/Batman #79–80; JLA in Crisis Secret Files and Origins #1 Issues #1,000,000 of the following series: Action Comics; Adventures of Superman; Aquaman; Azrael; Batman; Batman: Shadow of the Bat; Booster Gold; Catwoman; Chase; Chronos; Creeper; Detective Comics; The Flash; Green Arrow; Green Lantern; Hitman; Impulse; JLA; Legion of Super-Heroes; Legionnaires; Lobo; Martian Manhunter; Nightwing; The Power of Shazam!; Resurrection Man; Robin; Starman; Superboy; Supergirl; Superman; Superman: The Man of Steel; Superman: The Man of Tomorrow; Wonder Woman; Young Justice	1080	November 5, 2013	978-1401242435
DC One Million		1998		1080	May 3, 2022	978-1779515445
DCeased		2019–2023	DCeased #1–6, and more: DCeased: A Good Day to Die #1; DCeased: Dead Planet #1–7; DCeased: Unkillables #1–3; DCeased: Hope At World's End #1–15; DCeased: War of the Undead Gods #1–8	1056	June 17, 2025	978-1799501855
Injustice: Gods Among Us	1	2013–2015	Injustice: Gods Among Us #1–12, Annual #1, and more: Injustice: Gods Among Us: Year Two #1–12, Annual #1; Injustice: Gods Among Us: Year Three #1–12, Annual #1	1104	December 4, 2019	978-1401294984
Injustice: Gods Among Us	2	2015–2017	Injustice: Gods Among Us: Year Four #1–12, Annual #1, and more: Injustice: Gods Among Us: Year Five #1–20, Annual #1; Injustice: Ground Zero #1–12	1104	December 15, 2020	978-1779504685
Injustice 2		2017–2018	Injustice 2 #1–38, Annual #1–2	920	May 20, 2025	978-1799501466
Just Imagine Stan Lee Creating the DC Universe		2001–2002	Just Imagine issues: Just Imagine: Aquaman #1; Just Imagine: Batman #1; Just Imagine: Catwoman #1; Just Imagine: Crisis #1; Just Imagine: Flash #1; Just Imagine: Green Lantern #1; Just Imagine: JLA #1; Just Imagine: Robin #1; Just Imagine: Sandman #1; Just Imagine Secret Files and Origins #1; Just Imagine: Shazam #1; Just Imagine: Superman #1; Just Imagine: Wonder Woman #1	728	December 17, 2013	978-1401238858
Earth 2: The New 52	1	2012-2014	Earth 2 #0-26, 15.1 DeSaad, 15.2 Solomon Grundy, and more: Batman/Superman #1-4; Earth 2: World's End #10; Earth 2: Future's End #1	936	March 3, 2026	978-1799507666

=== Miscellaneous ===
Title	#	Years covered	Material collected	Pages	Pub. date	ISBN
Before Watchmen		2012–2013	Before Watchmen issues: Before Watchmen: Comedian #1–6; Before Watchmen: Rorschach #1–4; Before Watchmen: Minutemen #1–6; Before Watchmen: Silk Spectre #1–4; Before Watchmen: Nite Owl #1–4; Before Watchmen: Dr. Manhattan #1–4; Before Watchmen: Moloch #1–2; Before Watchmen: Ozymandias #1–6; Before Watchmen: Crimson Corsair #1; Before Watchmen: Dollar Bill #1	1064	December 24, 2018	978-1401285517
DC Universe by Steve Ditko (Note: This volume is a reprint of both previous Steve Ditko Omnibuses (listed below).)		1966-2008	Steve Ditko stories from: Detective Comics #483–485; Legends of the DC Universe 80-Page Giant #1; Tales of the New Gods #1; House of Secrets #139, 148; World's Finest Comics #249–255; Adventure Comics #467–478; Showcase #73, 75; Superman #400; House of Mystery #236, 247, 254, 258, 276; 1st Issue Special #7; Beware the Creeper #1–6; Cancelled Comics Cavalcade #1–2; Strange Adventures #188–189; The Legion of Super-Heroes #267–268, 272, 274, 276, 281; Shade, the Changing Man #1–8; Plop! #16; Weird War Tales #46, 49, 95, 99, 104–106; Secrets of Haunted House #9, 12, 41, 45; The Unexpected #189, 221; Ghosts #77, 111; Mystery in Space #111, 114–116; Time Warp #1–4; Stalker #1–4; Amazing World of DC Comics #13; The Outsiders #13; The Hawk and the Dove #1–2; Man-Bat #1	1168	June 10, 2025	978-1799501732
DC Universe: The Bronze Age by Jack Kirby		1971–1986	Jack Kirby stories from: In The Days of the Mob #1; Spirit World #1; The Demon #1–16; The Sandman #1–6; OMAC #1–8; Our Fighting Forces #151–162; Super Powers #1–5; Super Powers (vol. 2) #1–6; 1st Issue Special #1, 5–6; DC Comics Presents #84; Richard Dragon, Kung Fu Fighter #3; Weird Mystery Tales #1–3; Forbidden Tales of Dark Mansion #6	1472	June 30, 2019	978-1401292140
DC Universe: The Bronze Age by Jack Kirby		1971–1986	Jack Kirby stories from: In The Days of the Mob #1; Spirit World #1; The Demon #1–16; The Sandman #1–6; OMAC #1–8; Our Fighting Forces #151–162; Super Powers #1–5; Super Powers (vol. 2) #1–6; 1st Issue Special #1, 5–6; DC Comics Presents #84; Richard Dragon, Kung Fu Fighter #3; Weird Mystery Tales #1–3; Forbidden Tales of Dark Mansion #6	1472	July 28, 2026	978-1799508250
Gotham Central		2003–2006	Gotham Central #1–40	957	May 10, 2016	978-1401261924
Gotham Central		2003–2006	Gotham Central #1–40	957	April 12, 2022	978-1779515636
Scooby Apocalypse		2016–2019	Scooby Apocalypse #1–36	920	September 16, 2025	978-1799502975
The Jack Kirby Omnibus (Standard sized - 6.99" x 1.09" x 10.49")	1 (Note: Subtitled "Starring the Green Arrow".)	1946–1959	Jack Kirby stories from: Adventure Comics #250–256; World's Finest Comics #96–99; House of Mystery #61, 63, 65–66, 70, 72, 76, 84–85; House of Secrets #3–4, 8, 12; Tales of the Unexpected #12–13, 15–18, 21–24; My Greatest Adventure #15–18, 20–21, 28; All-Star Western #99; Real Fact Comics #1–2, 9	304	August 9, 2011	978-1401231071
The Jack Kirby Omnibus (Standard sized - 6.99" x 1.09" x 10.49")	2 (Note: Subtitled "Starring the Super Powers")	1950–1986	Jack Kirby stories from: Black Magic #1–9; 1st Issue Special #1, 5–6; Richard Dragon, Kung Fu Fighter #3; The Sandman #1–6; DC Comics Presents #84; Super Powers #1–5; Super Powers (vol. 2) #1–6; Kobra #1	624	May 7, 2013	978-1401238339
The Steve Ditko Omnibus (Standard sized - 6.99" x 1.09" x 10.49")	1 (Note: Subtitled "Starring Shade, the Changing Man".)	1966–1982	Steve Ditko stories from: Shade: The Changing Man #1–8; Stalker #1–4; Strange Adventures #188–189; Plop! #16; The House of Mystery #236, 247, 254, 258, 276; The House of Secrets #139, 148; Weird War Tales #46, 49, 95, 99, 104–106; Secrets of Haunted House #9, 12, 41, 45; The Unexpected #189, 221; Time Warp #1–4; Ghosts #77, 111; Mystery in Space #111, 114–115; Cancelled Comic Cavalcade #2	464	September 26, 2011	978-1401231118
The Steve Ditko Omnibus (Standard sized - 6.99" x 1.09" x 10.49")	2 (Note: Subtitled "Starring the Hawk and the Dove".)	1968–2008	Steve Ditko stories from: Adventure Comics #467–478; Detective Comics #483–485; The Hawk and the Dove #1–2; Legends of the DC Universe 80-Page Giant #1; Legion of Super-Heroes #267–268, 272, 274, 276, 281; Man-Bat #1; The Outsiders #13; Showcase #75; Tales of the New Gods	384	January 11, 2012	978-1401232351
Who's Who	1	1985–1989	Character profiles from: Who's Who: The Definitive Directory of the DC Universe Volume I–XXVI; Who's Who Update '87 #1–5; Who's Who Update '88 #1–4; Action Comics Annual #2; Batman Annual #13; Blackhawk Annual #1; Detective Comics Annual #2; Doctor Fate Annual #1; Green Arrow Annual #2; Justice League Annual #3; Secret Origins Annual #3; Swamp Thing Annual #5; The Flash Annual #3; The New Titans Annual #5; The Question Annual #2; Wonder Woman Annual #2	1320	April 13, 2021	978-1779505996
Who's Who	2	1990–1993	Character profiles from: Who's Who in the DC Universe #1–16; Who's Who in the Legion of Super-Heroes #1–7; Who's Who Update 1993 #1–2	1184	October 4, 2022	978-1779515193

== Vertigo Comics volumes ==
Volumes reprinting comic book titles originally published by the DC Comics imprint Vertigo Comics.

Volumes that have been previously reprinted under the Vertigo imprint are indicated with a double-dagger (‡).

Title	#	Years covered	Material collected	Pages	Pub. date	ISBN
100 Bullets	1	1999–2005	100 Bullets #1–58, and more: "Silent Night" from Vertigo: Winter's Edge #3	1376	January 12, 2021	978-1779507426
100 Bullets	2	2005–2009	100 Bullets #59–100	1176	June 28, 2022	978-1779514868
American Vampire	1 ‡	2010–2012	American Vampire #1–27, and more: American Vampire: Survival of the Fittest #1–5; American Vampire: Lord of Nightmares #1–5	984	October 4, 2022	978-1779516848
American Vampire	2	2012–2021	American Vampire #28–34, and more: American Vampire: The Long Road to Hell #1; American Vampire: Anthology #1–2; American Vampire: Second Cycle #1–11; American Vampire 1976 #1–10	912	October 11, 2022	978-1779516886
The Books of Magic (Note: Published under the DC Black Label imprint and The Sandman Universe sub-imprint.)	1	1991–1997	The Books of Magic (vol. 1) #1–4, (vol. 2) #1–32, and more: The Children's Crusade #1–2; Vertigo Gallery: Dreams and Nightmares #1; Vertigo Preview #1; Vertigo Visions – Doctor Occult #1; Who's Who #15; Arcana Annual #1; Mister E #1–4; The Books of Faerie: Auberon's Tale #1–3	1536	December 8, 2020	978-1779504630
The Books of Magic	2	1997–2000	The Books of Magic (vol. 2) #33–75, Annual #1–3, and more: The Books of Faerie #1–3; Books of Magic stories from Vertigo: Winter's Edge #1–3; Hellblazer: Books of Magic #1–2; Books of Faerie: Molly's Story #1–4	1480	January 11, 2022	978-1779513205
The Books of Magic	3	1999–2005	Hunter: The Age of Magic #1–25, and more: The Trenchcoat Brigade #1–4; The Names of Magic #1–5; Books of Magick: Life During Wartime #1–15	1200	November 22, 2022	978-1779517364
Dead Boy Detectives		1991–2015	The Dead Boy Detectives #1–12, and more: Jill Thompson's The Dead Boy Detectives; "Act Two" from Free Country: A Tale of the Children's Crusade; "Waiting for Good Dough" from Vertigo: Winter's Edge #3; Sandman Presents: Dead Boy Detectives #1–4; The Sandman #25; The Children's Crusade #1–2; Ghosts #1; The Witching Hour #1; Time Warp #1; Doom Patrol Annual #2; Swamp Thing Annual #7; Death: At Death's Door	776	October 10, 2023	978-1779524522
Ex Machina: The Complete Series ‡		2004–2010	Ex Machina #1–50, Special #1–4	1440	November 14, 2023	978-1779525635
John Constantine, Hellblazer by Jamie Delano	1	1987–1989	Hellblazer #1–22, Annual #1, and more: Swamp Thing #65–77; The Sandman #3	1,128	October 15, 2024	978-1779527844
John Constantine, Hellblazer by Jamie Delano	2	1989–2000	Hellblazer #23–40, 84, 250, and more: * The Horrorist #1–2; Hellblazer: Pandemonium; Hellblazer Special: Bad Blood #1–4; Vertigo Secret Files: Hellblazer #1	864	July 8, 2025	978-1799502067
Hellblazer by Garth Ennis		1991–1994	Hellblazer #41–50, 52–83, 129–133, Special #1, and more: Heartland #1; "Tainted Love" from Vertigo Jam #1; "All Those Little Girls and Boys" from Vertigo: Winter's Edge #2	1352	April 21, 2020	978-1401299910
Hellblazer by Paul Jenkins and Sean Phillips		1992–1998	Hellblazer #51, 85-128, 250, and more: Vertigo: Winter's Edge #1; Hellblazer: Books of Magic #1-2	1248	July 14, 2026	978-1799507642
House of Secrets		1996-2001	House of Secrets (vol. 2) #1-25, and more: House of Secrets: Facade #1-2; Vertigo: Winter's Edge #1 (Framing Sequence)	752	April 10, 2013	978-1401236731
The Invisibles		1994-2000	The Invisibles #1-25, and more: The Invisibles (vol. 2) #1-22; The Invisibles (vol. 3) #12-1; Absolute Vertigo #1; Vertigo: Winter's Edge #1-2	1536	August 28, 2012	978-1401234591
iZombie ‡		2010–2012	iZombie #1–28	672	October 24, 2023	978-1779523440
The League of Extraordinary Gentlemen: Jubilee Edition ‡		1999–2007	The League of Extraordinary Gentlemen #1–6, and more: The League of Extraordinary Gentlemen Volume II #1–6; The League of Extraordinary Gentlemen: Black Dossier	608	April 9, 2019	978-1401289003
Lucifer	1	2001–2003	Lucifer #1–35, and more: The Sandman Presents: Lucifer #1–3; Lucifer: Nirvana	1000	November 5, 2019	978-1401294762
Lucifer	2	2003–2007	Lucifer #36–75, and more: "Infernal Bargains Just Say No!" from House of Mystery Halloween Annual #2	1040	November 5, 2020	978-1779505644
Preacher: The 25th Anniversary	1	1995–1998	Preacher #1–33, and more: Preacher Special: Saint of Killers #1–4; Preacher Special: Cassidy – Blood & Whiskey	1080	August 4, 2020	978-1779502674
Preacher: The 25th Anniversary	2	1998–2000	Preacher #34–66, and more: Preacher Special: The Story of You-Know-Who; Preacher Special: The Good Old Boys; Preacher Special: One Man's War; Preacher: Tall in the Saddle	1104	August 31, 2021	978-1779510372
The Sandman	1	1988-1992	The Sandman #1-37, Special #1	1040	September 3, 2013	978-1401241889
The Sandman	2	1992-1996	The Sandman #38-75, and more: Vertigo Jam #1 ("The Castle"); Vertigo: Winter's Edge #3 ("How They Met Themselves")	1040	November 12, 2013	978-1401243142
The Sandman	3	1993-2015	The Sandman: Overture #1–6, and more: The Sandman: The Dream Hunters #1–4; The Sandman: Endless Nights #1; Sandman Midnight Theatre #1; Death: The High Cost of Living #1-3; Death: The Time of Your Life #1-3; Vertigo: Winter's Edge #1, 3 (stories)	976	March 27, 2019	978-1401287733
Scalped	1	2007–2009	Scalped #1–29	752	November 12, 2024	978-1779528384
Scalped	2	2009–2012	Scalped #30–60	768	February 4, 2025	978-1799500278
Sleeper ‡		2003–2005	Sleeper #1–12, and more: Point Blank #1–5; Sleeper: Season Two #1–12; Coup d'Ã‰tat: Sleeper #1; Coup d'Ã‰tat: Afterword #1	736	December 6, 2022	978-1779517425
Y: The Last Man		2002-2008	Y: The Last Man #1–60	1440	December 11, 2019	978-1401298159

== See also ==
- DC Compendium
- DC Comics Absolute Edition
- DC Finest
- DC Compact Comics
- List of DC Comics reprint collections
- Marvel Omnibus
- Marvel Epic Collection
- Marvel Complete Collections
- Marvel Masterworks
