= DC Compendium =

DC Comics publishing line

DC Compendium is a line of standard-size, softcover editions published by DC Comics since 2020, reprinting comics previously printed in single issue format. The line focuses on chronological reprints of the earliest years of stories featuring the company's lesser-known characters like Animal Man and Starman, as well as series and characters originally published under some of DC Comic's imprints like Vertigo Comics and WildStorm Productions.

== DC Comics ==
Title	#	Years covered	Material collected	Publication date	ISBN	Page count	Notes
Animal Man
Animal Man by Grant Morrison and Chas Truog		1988–1990	Animal Man (vol. 1) #1–26; "The Myth of the Creation" from Secret Origins (vol. 2) #39	October 1, 2024	978-1779527790	712	Published under the DC Black Label imprint.
Batman
Batman: Black & White		1996–2021	Batman: Black & White (1996) #1–4; Back-up stories from Batman: Gotham Knights #1–49; Batman Black and White (2013) #1–6; Batman: Black & White (2021) #1–6	October 7, 2025	978-1799502920	1256	
Batman '66		2005–2016	Batman '66 #1–30; Batman '66: The Lost Episode #1; "Batman A-Go-Go!" from Solo #7; Batman ‘66 Meets Wonder Woman ‘77 #1–6; Batman ‘66 Meets the Legion of Super-Heroes #1	August 26, 2025	978-1799502371	1024	
Batman: Night of the Owls		2011–2012	Batman (vol. 2) #1–12, Annual #1, and more: All Star Western (vol. 3) #9; Catwoman (vol. 4) #9; Nightwing (vol. 3) #8–9; Red Hood and the Outlaws #9; Batgirl (vol. 4) #9; Batman and Robin (vol. 2) #9; Batman: The Dark Knight #9; Birds of Prey (vol. 3) #9; Detective Comics (vol. 2) #9; Batwing #9	September 26, 2026	978-1799509165	560	
Batman: Death of the Family		2012–2013	Batman (vol. 2) #13–20, Annual #2, and more: Detective Comics (vol. 2) #1-4, 15-17; Catwoman (vol. 4) #13-14; Nightwing (vol. 3) #14-16; Red Hood and the Outlaws #0; Batgirl (vol. 4) #13-17; Batman and Robin (vol. 2) #13-17; Suicide Squad (vol. 4) #14-15; Teen Titans (vol. 4) #15-16	March 30, 2027	978-1799514763	608	
Batman Beyond
Batman Beyond: The Animated Series Classics		1999–2001	Batman Beyond #1–6, (vol. 2) #1–24; Superman Adventures #64	March 5, 2024	978-1779525697	750	
Batman Beyond: Unlimited		2010–2013	Batman Beyond (vol. 3) #1–6, (vol. 4) #1–8, and more: Batman Beyond: Return of the Joker #1; Superman/Batman Annual #4; Justice League Beyond #21, 25; Superman Beyond #0; Batman Beyond Unlimited #1–18	March 31, 2026	978-1799507741	1208	
Green Lantern
Green Lantern: Kyle Rayner Rising		1994–1995	Green Lantern (vol. 3) #0, 48–65, and more: R.E.B.E.L.S. '94 #1; New Titans #116–117, 124–125; Guy Gardner: Warrior #27–28; Darkstars #34; Damage #16	November 21, 2023	978-1779526274	671	
Green Lantern Compendium One: Rebirth		2005–2007	Green Lantern (vol. 4) #1–17, and more: Green Lantern: Rebirth #1–6; Green Lantern Secret Files 2005 #1; Rann/Thanagar War #1–6; Green Lantern Corps (vol. 2) #1–9; Green Lantern Corps: Recharge #1–5; Guy Gardner: Collateral Damage #1–2; Ion #1–12; Rann/Thanagar War: Infinite Crisis Special #1	December 23, 2025	978-1799053347	1536	
Green Lantern Compendium Two: The Sinestro Corps War		2007–2009	Green Lantern (vol. 4) #18–38, and more: Green Lantern Corps #10–32; Green Lantern Sinestro Corps Special #1; Tales of the Sinestro Corps: Parallax #1; Tales of the Sinestro Corps: Cyborg Superman #1; Blue Beetle (vol. 7) #20; Tales of the Sinestro Corps: Superman Prime #1; Tales of the Sinestro Corps: Ion #1; Green Lantern / Sinestro Corps Secret Files and Origins #1; Final Crisis: Rage of the Red Lanterns #1; "Fear of the Dark" from DC Universe Halloween Special (2008) #1; "Halloween the Guy Way" from DC Universe Halloween Special (2009) #1; a story from DC Universe #0	March 10, 2026	978-1799507451	1392	
Green Lantern Compendium: Blackest Night		2007–2009	Blackest Night #0-8, and more: Green Lantern (vol. 4) #39-52, Green Lantern Corps (vol. 2) #33-46; Blackest Night: JSA #1-3; Blackest Night: The Flash #1-3; Blackest Night: Tales of the Corps #1-3; Blackest Night: Wonder Woman #1-3; Adventure Comics (vol. 2) #7; The Atom and Hawkman #46; Green Arrow and Black Canary #30; Phantom Stranger (vol. 2) #42; Untold Tales of Blackest Night #1	March 16, 2027	978-1799515289	1480	
Joker
The Joker by James Tynion IV		2020–2022	The Joker (vol. 2) #1–15, Annual 2021; Batman: The Joker War Zone #1; Batman (vol. 3) #100	September 10, 2024	978-1779528209	488	
Justice League Dark
Justice League Dark: The New 52		2011–2015	Justice League Dark #0–40, Annual #1–2, and more: Justice League Dark: Future's End #1; Constantine #5; I, Vampire #7–8; Justice League (vol. 2) #22–23; Justice League of America (vol. 3) #6–7; The New 52: Free Comic Book Day Special Edition #1; Trinity of Sin: Pandora #1–3; Trinity of Sin: Phantom Stranger #11, 14, 17	January 6, 2026	978-1799506676	1624	
Justice Society
JSA	1	1999–2001	JSA #1–25, Annual #1, and more: JSA Secret Files and Origins #1–2; Day of Judgment #1–5; Day of Judgment Secret Files and Origins #1; Golden Age Secret Files and Origins #1; Superman (vol. 2) #172; Action Comics #780, 813; Impulse #67; Martian Manhunter #18–19; Stars and S.T.R.I.P.E. #9; Hourman #9, 18–19; Guide to the DC Universe Secret Files and Origins 2000; Sins of Youth: Starwoman and the JSA, Jr. #1; Young Justice #16; Young Justice: Sins of Youth #1–2; Young Justice: Sins of Youth Secret Files and Origins #1	November 5, 2024	978-1779528315	1312	
JSA	2	2001–2010	JSA #26–51, and more: JSA Secret Files #2; Green Arrow (vol. 3) #12–13; Suicide Squad (vol. 2) #12; JSA: Our Worlds At War #1; Hawkman (vol. 4) #19; JSA All-Stars #1–8; JLA/JSA Secret Files #1; All-Star Comics 80-Page Giant #1; JLA/JSA: Virtue and Vice #1; "Sorrow Ever More!" from Secret Origins of Super Villains Giant #1	November 24, 2026	978-1799509653	1240	
Lobo
Lobo Big Fraggin' Compendium (Bigger Fraggin' Compendium)	1	1983–1994	Lobo #1–4, (vol. 2) #0–9, Annual #1–2, and more: The Omega Men #3; The Demon (vol. 3) #11–15; Lobo Paramilitary Christmas Special #1; Lobo's Back #1–4; Lobo: Blazing Chain of Love #1; Lobo: Infanticide #1–4; Lobo: Portrait of a Victim #1; Lobo: Unamerican Gladiators #1–4; Lobo Convention Special #1; Lobocop #1; Green Lantern Corps Quarterly #8; Superman: The Man of Steel #30; Lobo: A Contract on Gawd #1–4; Lobo: In the Chair #1; Profile pages from Who's Who #8	June 26, 2024	978-1779525789	1320	
Lobo Big Fraggin' Compendium (Bigger Fraggin' Compendium)	2	1994-1997	Lobo (vol. 2) #10-40, Annual #3, and more: Lobo/Deadman: The Brave and the Bald #1; Lobo/Demon: Hellowe’en #1; Lobo: Bounty Hunting for Fun & Profit #1; Lobo: Chained #1; Lobo: Death & Taxes #1-4; Lobo: Fragtastic Voyage #1; Lobo: I Quit #1; Lobo Goes to Hollywood #1; Lobo’s Big Babe Spring Break Special #1; Lobo Gallery: Portraits of a Bastich #1; Showcase ’95 #9.	May 25, 2027	978-1799515319	1200	
Nightwing
Nightwing: A Knight in Blüdhaven	1	1995–1998	Nightwing #1–4, (vol. 2) #1–25, 1,000,000, Annual #1, and more: Wizard Presents: Nightwing #½; Nightwing/Huntress #1–4; Green Arrow (vol. 2) #134–135; Detective Comics #723–725, 1,000,000; Robin (vol. 4) #55	May 7, 2024	978-1779525864	1024	
Nightwing: A Knight in Blüdhaven	2	1998–2001	Nightwing (vol. 2) #26–59, and more: Action Comics #771; Batman Annual #23; Birds of Prey #8, 20–21; Nightwing Secret Files and Origins #1; Nightwing 80-Page Giant #1; Nightwing: Target #1	May 20, 2025	978-1799501480	1112	
Nightwing: A Knight in Blüdhaven	3	2001–2003	Nightwing (vol. 2) #60–82, and more: Batman #600, 605; The Flash Plus Nightwing #1; Birds of Prey #37; Batman: Gotham Knights #14, 16–17, 20–21; Nightwing: Target #1; Batman: The 10-Cent Adventure #1; Joker: Last Laugh Secret Files and Origins #1; Joker: Last Laugh #1–6; Nightwing: Our Worlds At War #1	May 5, 2026	978-1799508120	1176	
Nightwing: A Knight in Blüdhaven	4	2003–2007	Nightwing (vol. 2) #83-117, Annual #2, and more: Batman #634; Batman/Nightwing: Bloodborne #1; Outsiders: Five of a Kind - Nightwing/Captain Boomerang #1; Excerpts from Infinite Crisis #1-7; Excerpts from Teen Titans #33	May 18, 2027	978-1799515302	1000	
Robin
Robin: Tim Drake	1	1990–1999	Robin (vol. 2) #1–5, Annual #1–2, and more: "Footsteps" from Batman 80-Page Giant #2; Detective Comics #618–621; Batman #455–457, 465–469, 480; Robin II: The Joker's Wild! #1–4; Superman: The Man of Steel #14; Superman (vol. 2) #70; Robin III: Cry of the Huntress #1–6; Showcase '93 #1–6, 11–12	July 23, 2024	978-1779525932	1103	
Robin: Tim Drake	2	1994–1996	Robin (vol. 2) #6–30, Annual #3–4, and more: Azrael: Agent of the Bat #15–16; Batman: Shadow of the Bat #48–49; Detective Comics #685–686, 695–696; Catwoman (vol. 2) #25, 31–32; Green Arrow (vol. 2) #105; Showcase '94 #5–6; The Batman Chronicles #2, 4	December 22, 2026	978-1799509844	1072	
Red Robin: Tim Drake		2003–2011	Red Robin #1–26, "Robin" #175–183, and more: Batman: The Return of Bruce Wayne #1–6; Blackest Night: Batman #1–3; Bruce Wayne: The Road Home: Red Robin #1; Superman/Batman (vol. 1) #62; Batgirl (vol. 3) #8; Teen Titans (vol.3) #92; Batman #709; Gotham City Sirens (vol. 1) #22	August 25, 2026	978-1799508847	1080	
Starman
Starman	1	1994–1999	Starman (vol. 2) #0–42, Annual #1–2, and more: Showcase '95 #12; Showcase '96 #4–5; The Shade #1–4; Starman Secret Files and Origins #1; The Power of Shazam! (vol. 2) #35–36; Starman 80-Page Giant #1	August 1, 2021	978-1779509413	1448	
Starman	2	1998–2012	Starman (vol. 2) #43–81, 1,000,000, and more: Starman: The Mist #1; Batman/Hellboy/Starman #1–2; JSA: All-Stars #4; Stars and S.T.R.I.P.E. #0; All-Star Comics 80-Page Giant #1; Starman/Congorilla #1; The Shade (vol. 2) #1–12	December 13, 2022	978-1779515223	1456	
Superman
Superman: The Death and Return of Superman		1992–1993	Superman (vol. 2) #75–83, Annual #5, and more: Action Comics #684–692, Annual #5; Adventures of Superman #497–505, Annual #5; Superman: The Man of Steel #18–26, Annual #2; Justice League of America (vol. 2) #69–70; Green Lantern #46; Legacy of Superman #1; Supergirl and Team Luthor #1; Excerpts from Action Comics #683; Excerpts from Adventures of Superman #496; Excerpts from Superman #73; Excerpts from Superman: The Man of Steel #17	May 20, 2025	978-1799501497	1368	
Superman Adventures	1	1996–1999	Superman Adventures #1–29, Annual #1; Batman & Superman Adventures: World's Finest #1; Superman Adventures Special: Superman vs. Lobo #1	June 17, 2025	978-1799501862	896	
Superman Adventures	2	1999–2002	Superman Adventures #30–66; Superman & Batman Magazine #1, 3–8; Excerpts from Superman & Batman Magazine #4	June 2, 2026	978-1799508342	984	
Superman: City of Tomorrow		1999–2000	Superman (vol. 2) #151–159, and more: Adventures of Superman #573–581; Action Comics #760–768; Superman: The Man of Steel #95–103; Superman Y2K #1; Superman: Metropolis Secret Files #1; "Dreams in Smoke" from Secret Origins of Super-Villains 80-Page Giant #1	July 22, 2025	978-1799502203	952	
Superman: President Luthor		2000–2001	Superman (vol. 2) #160–168 and more: Action Comics #769–777; Adventures of Superman #582–590; Superman: Man of Steel #104–112; Superman: Emperor Joker #1; Superman: President Lex #1; Superman: Lex 2000 #1; Superman: Return to Krypton #1; Secret Files President Luthor #1; Detective Comics #756	Apr 27, 2027	978-1799515296	1016	
Superman: Warworld Saga		2021–2023	Action Comics #1030–1046, "2021 Annual", "2022 Annual", and more: Batman/Superman: Authority Special #1; Future State: Superman: House of El #1; Future State: Superman: Worlds of War #1–2; Superman: Warworld Apocalypse #1	November 14, 2023	978-1779523884	712	
Teen Titans
Teen Titans by Geoff Johns	1	2000–2005	Teen Titans (vol. 3) #1–28, ½, and more: Beast Boy #1–4; Outsiders (vol. 3) #24–25; Titans/Young Justice: Graduation Day #1; Teen Titans/Outsiders Secret Files 2003 #1; Teen Titans/Legion Special #1; Supergirl (vol. 4) #2; Teen Titans/Outsiders Secret Files 2005 #1; The Return of Donna Troy #1–4; Legends of the DC Universe 80-Page Giant #2	April 28, 2026	978-1799507925	1112	
Teen Titans by Geoff Johns	2	2006–2008	Teen Titans (vol. 3) #32–54, Annual #1 and more: Robin #146–147; Superman/Batman #26; Superman #712; Crisis Aftermath: The Battle for Blüdhaven #1–6; Wonder Girl (vol. 1) #1–6; DC Special: Cyborg #1–6; Blue Beetle (vol. 2) #18; Story from DC Infinite Halloween Special #1; Character Origins from 52 #25, 31–32, 41, 47; Excerpts from Countdown #51; Excerpts from Infinite Crisis #1–7	Feb 9, 2027	978-1799515272	1000	
Wonder Woman
Wonder Woman by Brian Azzarello and Cliff Chiang		2011–2014	Wonder Woman (vol. 4) #0–35, 23.1; "The Secret Origin of Wonder Woman!" from Secret Origins (vol. 3) #6	November 10, 2026	978-1799509660	928	

=== Events, crossovers and storylines ===
Title	#	Years covered	Material collected	Publication date	ISBN	Page count
Dark Nights: Metal		2017–2018	Dark Nights: Metal #1–6, and more: Nightwing (vol. 5) #29; The Flash (vol. 5) #33; Hal Jordan and the Green Lantern Corps #32; Green Arrow (vol. 6) #32; Suicide Squad (vol. 5) #26; Teen Titans #12; Justice League (vol. 3) #32–33; Dark Days: The Forge #1; Dark Days: The Casting #1; Batman: The Red Death #1; Batman: The Devastator #1; Batman: The Merciless #1; Batman: The Murder Machine #1; Batman: The Drowned #1; Batman: The Dawnbreaker #1; Dark Nights: The Batman Who Laughs #1; Batman: Lost #1; Hawkman: Found #1; Dark Knights Rising: The Wild Hunt #1	March 18, 2025	978-1799500841	728
Dark Nights: Death Metal		2020–2021	Dark Nights: Death Metal #1–7, and more: Dark Nights: Death Metal Legends of the Dark Knights #1; Dark Nights: Death Metal The Last 52: War of the Multiverses #1; Dark Nights: Death Metal Speed Metal #1; Dark Nights: Death Metal Infinite Hour Exxxtreme! #1; Dark Nights: Death Metal Trinity Crisis #1; Dark Nights: Death Metal Robin King #1; Dark Nights: Death Metal Multiverse's End #1; Dark Nights: Death Metal Rise of the New God #1; Dark Nights: Death Metal The Multiverse Who Laughs #1; Dark Nights: Death Metal Guidebook #1; Dark Nights: Death Metal The Secret Origin #1; Dark Nights: Death Metal The Last Stories of the DC Universe #1; Justice League (vol. 4) #53-57	January 5, 2027	978-1799517641	896
Injustice: Gods Among Us	1	2013–2015	Injustice: Gods Among Us #1–12, Annual #1; Injustice: Gods Among Us: Year Two #1–12, Annual #1; Injustice: Gods Among Us: Year Three #1–12	December 3, 2024	978-1779528001	1200
Injustice: Gods Among Us	2	2015–2017	Injustice: Gods Among Us: Year Four #1–12, Annual #1; Injustice: Gods Among Us: Year Five #1–20, Annual #1; Injustice: Ground Zero #1–12	November 11, 2025	978-1799503187	1064

== Milestone Media ==
Title	#	Years covered	Material collected	Publication date	ISBN	Page count
Milestone	1	1993–1995	Hardware #1–12; Blood Syndicate #1–12; Icon #1–10; Static #1–8; Xombi #0–11; Shadow Cabinet #0	February 1, 2022	978-1779513106	1309
Milestone	2	1994–1995	Static #9–20; Icon #11–21; Hardware #13–21; Blood Syndicate #13–23; Superman: The Man of Steel #35–36; Superboy (vol. 3) #6–7; Steel #6–7; Worlds Collide #1; Shadow Cabinet #1–4	January 31, 2023	978-1779514950	1298
Milestone	3	1994–1995	Shadow Cabinet #5–13; Hardware #22–28; Kobalt #1–4; Deathwish #1–4; Static #21–25; Blood Syndicate #24–27; Icon #22–27	February 20, 2024	978-1779526090	1205
Milestone	4	1995–1996	Blood Syndicate #28–32; Hardware #29–38; Icon #28–37; Static #26–31; Xombi #12–21; Shadow Cabinet #14–17; My Name is Holocaust #1–5; Long Hot Summer #1–3	February 4, 2025	978-1799500261	1304
Milestone	5	1995–2010	Blood Syndicate #33–35; Hardware #39–50; Icon #38–42; Static #32–45; Wise Son: The White Wolf #1–4; Heroes #1–6; Static Shock!: Rebirth of the Cool #1–4; Milestone Forever #1–2; Xombi Hanukkah Special	June 16, 2026	978-1799508328	1336

== Vertigo Comics ==
Compendium reprints of Vertigo Comics series are published under the DC Black Label imprint.

Title	#	Years covered	Material collected	Publication date	ISBN	Page count	Notes
DMZ	1	2006–2009	DMZ #1–36	March 31, 2020	978-1779504357	840	
DMZ	2	2009–2012	DMZ #37–72	January 11, 2022	978-1779514820	824	
Fables	1	2002–2006	Fables #1–41; Fables: The Last Castle; "A Wolf in the Fold" text story from Fables vol. 1; Fables: 1,001 Nights of Snowfall	October 20, 2020	978-1779504548	1180	
Fables	2	2004–2009	Fables #42–82	May 11, 2021	978-1779509444	1402	
Fables	3	2009–2012	Fables #83–113; Jack of Fables #33–35; The Literals #1–3; Fables: Werewolves of the Heartland	August 21, 2021	978-1779510358	1094	
Fables	4	2012–2015	Fables #114–150	December 21, 2021	978-1779513342	909	
The Invisibles		1994–2000	The Invisibles #1–25, (vol. 2) #1–22, (vol. 3) #12–1; "And We're All Police Men" from Vertigo: Winter’s Edge #1	January 20, 2026	978-1799506683	1536	
Preacher	1	1995–1998	Preacher #1–33; Preacher Special: Saint of Killers #1–4; Preacher Special: Cassidy - Blood and Whiskey #1	October 7, 2026	978-1799509349	1040	
Sandman Mystery Theatre	1	1993–1996	Sandman Mystery Theatre #1–36, Annual #1	May 2, 2023	978-1779521538	981	
Sandman Mystery Theatre	2	1996–1999	Sandman Mystery Theatre #37–70; "Spirit of the Season" from Vertigo: Winter's Edge #1, "In the City of Dreams" from #2	August 26, 2025	978-1799504894	888	
Sweet Tooth		2009–2013	Sweet Tooth #1–40	June 8, 2021	978-1779510242	915	
The Unwritten	1	2009–2013	The Unwritten #1–30; The Unwritten: Tommy Taylor and the Ship that Sank Twice	June 20, 2023	978-1779521750	984	
The Unwritten	2	2012–2015	The Unwritten #31–54, 31.5–35.5; The Unwritten: Apocalypse #1–12	September 15, 2026	978-1799509158	984	
Y: The Last Man	1	2002–2005	Y: The Last Man #1–31	November 20, 2020	978-1779504531	728	
Y: The Last Man	1	2002–2005	Y: The Last Man #1–31	November 2, 2021	978-1779516145	728	TV tie-in cover.
Y: The Last Man	2	2005–2008	Y: The Last Man #32–60	March 8, 2022	978-1779516084	704	

== WildStorm Productions ==
Title	#	Years covered	Material collected	Publication date	ISBN	Page count	Notes
Ex Machina	1	2004–2007	Ex Machina #1–25, Special #1–2	April 15, 2020	978-1401299897	664	Published under the DC Black Label imprint.
Ex Machina	2	2007–2010	Ex Machina #26–50, Special #3–4	February 23, 2021	978-1779508041	704	Published under the DC Black Label imprint.
Planetary		1999–2009	Planetary #1–27; Planetary/The Authority: Ruling the World #1; Planetary/Batman: Night on Earth #1; Planetary/JLA: Terra Oculta #1	July 14, 2026	978-1799508601	864	
Stormwatch: The Road to Authority		1996–1998	Stormwatch #37–50, (vol. 2) #1–11; Stormwatch Preview	January 7, 2025	978-1779528063	656	
Tom Strong	1	1999–2006	Tom Strong #1–36	May 16, 2023	978-1779521729	952	
Tom Strong	1	1999–2006	Tom Strong #1–36	November 10, 2026	978-1799517696	906	
Tom Strong	2	2002–2014	Tom Strong's Terrific Tales #1–12, and more: America's Best Comics Special #1; ABC Sketchbook #1; The Many Worlds of Tesla Strong #1; ABC: A to Z #1, 4; Tom Strong and the Robots of Doom #1–6; Tom Strong and the Planet of Peril #1–6	March 17, 2026	978-1799507468	752	
Top 10		1999–2009	Top 10 #1–12, and more: "Deadfellas" from America's Best Comics Special #1; Smax #1–5; Top 10: The Forty-Niners; Top 10: Beyond the Farthest Precinct #1–5; Top 10 Season Two #1–4, Special #1	April 11, 2023	978-1779521682	824	
WildC.A.T.s	1	1992–1995	WildC.A.T.s #0–13, 15–20, and more: WildC.A.T.s' Special #1; Team One: WildC.A.T.s #1–2; Team One: Stormwatch #1–2; WildC.A.T.s Trilogy #1–3; WildC.A.T.s Sourcebook #1–2	November 5, 2024	978-1779526021	914	

== See also ==
- DC Omnibus
- DC Finest
- DC Compact Comics
- List of DC Comics reprint collections
- Marvel Omnibus
- Marvel Epic Collection
- Marvel Complete Collections
- Marvel Masterworks
