= DC Finest =

Paperback line from DC Comics

The first DC Finest release: Batman Year One & Two

DC Finest is a line of full-color trade paperbacks from DC Comics. Announced at 2024's ComicsPRO Comics Conference, their stated intention is to be "affordably priced, large-size paperback collections" providing "a new line of comprehensive collections of the most in-demand periods, genres, and characters from across DC history".

The format is similar to Marvel's Epic Collection line, which launched in 2013.

As well as covering DC's major heroes, and offering a line devoted to company-wide events, the books allow fans to "curate collections of their favorite tales from specific genres, which may include science fiction, romance, war, westerns, horror, and other genres", in addition featuring reprinted comics for the first time.

Ten books were announced for release in November and December of 2024, with a further 35 for 2025.

== DC Universe volumes ==
=== Aquaman ===
Subtitle	Years covered	Issues collected	Writers	Artists	Pgs.	Pub. date	Cover source	ISBN
King of Atlantis	1956–1962	Aquaman (vol. 1) #1–3; Showcase #30–33; Aquaman stories from: Adventure Comics #229–280, 282, 284; Action Comics #272; Detective Comics #293–300; World's Finest Comics #125; Superman's Girl Friend, Lois Lane #12	Jack Miller, Robert Bernstein	Ramona Fradon, Nick Cardy	624	Jan 7, 2025	Showcase #31	978-1779529893
The Haunted Sea	1962–1965	Aquaman (vol. 1) #4–24; The Brave and the Bold (vol. 1) #51; Aquaman stories from: World's Finest Comics #126–133, 135, 137, 139; Superman's Girl Friend, Lois Lane #29; Superman's Pal, Jimmy Olsen #55, 78	Jack Miller	Ramona Fradon, Nick Cardy	664	Jun 1, 2027	Aquaman (vol. 1) #5	978-1799514961

=== The Atom ===
Subtitle	Years covered	Issues collected	Writers	Artists	Pgs.	Pub. date	Cover source	ISBN
Birth of the Atom	1961–1964	The Atom #1–15; Showcase #34–36; The Brave and the Bold #53, 55; Justice League of America (vol. 1) #7, 14, 18; Strange Adventures (vol. 1) #135, 145	Gardner Fox	Gil Kane	592	May 18, 2027	Showcase #36	978-1799514954

=== Batgirl ===
Subtitle	Years covered	Issues collected	Writers	Artists	Pgs.	Pub. date	Cover source	ISBN
Silent Knight	1999–2000	Batgirl (vol. 1) #1–6, Annual #1 and more: Batman: No Man’s Land #0; Batman #565, 567 and #569; Detective Comics #732 and #734; Batman: Legends of the Dark Knight #120; Azrael: Agent of the Bat #56–57 and #60–61; The Batman Chronicles #18; Batman: Gotham Knights #2; Batman: Gotham City Secret Files #1; Ghost/Batgirl #1–4 pages from: Batman: Shadow of the Bat #82; Batman #563; Detective Comics #733; Batman: Legends of the Dark Knight #119; The Batman Chronicles #16; Young Justice #20–21	Kelley Puckett, Scott Peterson, Various	Damion Scott, Various	696	Jan 5, 2027	Batgirl (vol. 1) #1	978-1799515067
Nobody Dies Tonight	2000–2002	Batgirl (vol. 1) #7–27; Superboy (vol. 4) #85; Supergirl (vol. 4) #63	Kelley Puckett, Joe Kelly	Damion Scott	552	Apr 8, 2025	Batgirl: A Knight Alone TPB	978-1799501046

=== Batman ===
Subtitle	Years covered	Issues collected	Writers	Artists	Pgs.	Pub. date	Cover source	ISBN
The Case of the Chemical Syndicate	1939–1941	Batman #1–5; Batman stories from: Detective Comics #27–51; World's Best Comics #1; New York World's Fair Comics #2	Bill Finger, Gardner Fox	Bob Kane, Jerry Robinson, Sheldon Moldoff, George Roussos	616	Jan 27, 2026	Detective Comics #27	978-1799506706
The Demon Lives Again!	1971–1972	Batman #231–245; Detective Comics #410–429	Dennis O'Neil, Frank Robbins	Neal Adams, Irv Novick, Bob Brown, Dick Giordano	600	Oct 6, 2026	Batman #232	978-1799510307
Night of the Stalker	1972–1975	Batman #246–261; Detective Comics #430–445; Aurora Comic Scenes #187–140	Frank Robbins, Dennis O'Neil, Len Wein, Archie Goodwin, Michael Fleisher, David Vern Reed, Sal Amendola, Steve Englehart, Vin Amendola	Neal Adams, Ernie Chan, Irv Novick, Walt Simonson, Rich Buckler, José Luis García-López, Jim Aparo, Alex Toth, Howard Chaykin, Sal Amendola, Bob Brown, Dick Dillin	584	Sep 7, 2027	Detective Comics #439	978-1799520016
The Curse of Crime Alley	1979–1980	Batman #307–324; Detective Comics #482–490; The Brave and the Bold (vol. 1) #159; DC Special Series #21	Len Wein, Dennis O'Neil	Irv Novick, Don Newton	624	Dec 8, 2026	Batman #324	978-1799509615
Red Skies	1985–1986	Batman #388–400, Annual #10; Detective Comics #554–567; Secret Origins (vol. 2) #6	Doug Moench	Gene Colan, Tom Mandrake	656	Sep 2, 2025	Detective Comics #556	978-1799502739
Year One & Two	1986–1987	Batman #401–412, Annual #11; Detective Comics #568–579	Frank Miller, Mike W. Barr, Max Allan Collins	David Mazzucchelli, Alan Davis, Todd McFarlane	632	Nov 5, 2024	Batman #405	978-1779528353
The Killing Joke and Other Stories	1987–1988	Batman #413–422; Detective Comics #580–589; Batman: Son of the Demon; Batman: The Killing Joke	Alan Moore, Mike W. Barr, Jim Starlin, Alan Grant, John Wagner	Brian Bolland, Jerry Bingham, Jim Aparo, Norm Breyfogle	608	May 20, 2025	Batman: The Killing Joke	978-1799501459
A Death in the Family	Aug. 1988– Dec. 1988	Batman #423–429, Annual #12; Detective Comics #590–595, Annual #1; Batman: The Cult #1–4	Jim Starlin, Alan Grant	Jim Aparo, Bernie Wrightson, Norm Breyfogle, Mike DeCarlo	640	Apr 21, 2026	Batman: A Death in the Family TPB	978-1799508571
Blind Justice	Jan. 1989– Aug. 1989	Batman #430–435, Annual #13; Detective Comics #596–603, Annual #2; Secret Origins (vol. 2) #36 & #39	Sam Hamm, John Byrne, Alan Grant	Denys Cowan, Jim Aparo, Norm Breyfogle	592	Jul 14, 2026	Batman: Blind Justice TPB	978-1799513162
A Lonely Place of Dying	1989–1990	Batman #436–444; Detective Comics #604–609; The New Titans #60–61, 65; Secret Origins (vol. 2) #44, Special #1; Batman Villains Secret Files and Origins 2005 #1; Christmas with the Super-Heroes #2; Arkham Asylum: A Serious House on Serious Earth	Marv Wolfman, Alan Grant, Grant Morrison	Pat Broderick, Jim Aparo, Norm Breyfogle, Dave McKean	664	Apr 6, 2027	The New Titans #61	978-1799514909

=== Blue Beetle ===
Subtitle	Years covered	Issues collected	Writers	Artists	Pgs.	Pub. date	Cover source	ISBN
Blue Beetle Challenges the Red Knight	1964–1981	Blue Beetle (1964) #1–5, #50–54; Blue Beetle stories from Captain Atom (1965) #83–86; Blue Beetle (1967) #1–5; Charlton Bullseye #1	Joe Gill, Steve Ditko, Benjamin Smith	Steve Ditko, Bill Fraccio, Tony Tallarico, Dan Reed	368	Aug 12, 2025	Blue Beetle (1964) #5	978-1799502487

=== Catwoman ===
Subtitle	Years covered	Issues collected	Writers	Artists	Pgs.	Pub. date	Cover source	ISBN
Life Lines	1988–1994	Catwoman (vol. 1) #1–4, (vol. 2) #1–12, Annual #1; Batman: Catwoman Defiant #1; Catwoman stories from: Action Comics Weekly #611–614; Showcase '93 #1–4	Mindy Newell, Jo Duffy	J. J. Birch, Jim Balent	600	Dec 17, 2024	Catwoman (vol. 2) #1	978-1779528469
Vengeance and Vindication	1994–1996	Catwoman (vol. 2) #0, 13–32, Annual #2; Batman: Shadow of the Bat #43–44; A story from Showcase '95 #4	Doug Moench, Chuck Dixon, Jo Duffy	Jim Balent	624	Jun 10, 2025	Catwoman (vol. 2) #14	978-1799501756
Creatures of the Night	1996–1998	Catwoman (vol. 2) #33–53, Annual #3–4; C story from DC Universe Holiday Bash #1; Batman Villains: Secret Files & Origins #1	Doug Moench, Chuck Dixon, Jo Duffy	Jim Balent	648	Dec 22, 2026	Catwoman (vol. 2) #37	978-1799509813
To Catch a Thief	1998–1999	Catwoman (vol. 2) #54–71, 1,000,000; Catwoman / Wildcat #1–4; Catwoman Plus #1; story from Batman 80–Page Giant #1	Devin Grayson, Beau Smith, Chuck Dixon	Jim Balent, Sergio Cariello	576	Jun 8, 2027	Catwoman (vol. 2) #54	978-1799514978

=== Deadman ===
Subtitle	Years covered	Issues collected	Writers	Artists	Pgs.	Pub. date	Cover source	ISBN
How Many Times Can a Guy Die?	1967–1977	Strange Adventures #205–216; Aquaman #50–52; Justice League of America #94; The Brave and the Bold #79, 86, 104, 133; The Phantom Stranger #33, 39–41; World's Finest Comics #223, 227; The Forever People #9–10; Challengers of the Unknown #74; Superman #183	Arnold Drake, Neal Adams, Bob Haney	Neal Adams	576	May 26, 2026	Strange Adventures #207	978-1799507710

=== The Demon ===
Subtitle	Years covered	Issues collected	Writers	Artists	Pgs.	Pub. date	Cover source	ISBN
Birth of the Demon	1972–1981	The Demon (vol. 1) #1–16; The Brave and the Bold (vol. 1) #109, 137; The Batman Family #17; Detective Comics #482–485; Wonder Woman (vol. 1) #280–282	Jack Kirby, Jim Starlin, Bob Rozakis	Jack Kirby, Juan Manuel Ortiz	576	Feb 24, 2026	The Demon #1	978-1799507437

=== Doom Patrol ===
Subtitle	Years covered	Issues collected	Writers	Artists	Pgs.	Pub. date	Cover source	ISBN
The World's Strangest Heroes	1963–1966	The Brave and the Bold #65; Doom Patrol #86–102; Challengers of the Unknown #48; My Greatest Adventure #80–85; Teen Titans (vol. 1) #6	Arnold Drake	Bruno Premiani, Bob Brown	624	Feb 11, 2025	Doom Patrol #94	978-1799500353
The Death of the Doom Patrol!	1966–1979	Showcase #94–96; Superman Family #191–193; Doom Patrol #103–121	Arnold Drake	Bruno Premiani	584	Jan 13, 2026	Doom Patrol #121	978-1799506690
The End Sanctifies the Means	1993–1995	Doom Patrol (vol. 2) #64–87, Annual #2; Vertigo Jam #1	Rachel Pollack	Ted McKeever, Linda Medley, Stan Woch	672	Oct 20, 2026	Doom Patrol (vol. 2) #64	978-1799509318

=== Events ===
Subtitle		Years covered	Issues collected	Writers	Artists	Pgs.	Pub. date	Cover source	ISBN
Crisis on Infinite Earths	Part One	1985–1986	Crisis on Infinite Earths #1–4, and more: Batman #389–391; Detective Comics #555–558; Justice League of America #244; Green Lantern (vol. 2) #194; Wonder Woman #327; Infinity, Inc. #18–19; The Fury Of Firestorm #41; All-Star Squadron #50–52; The Losers Special; pages from DC Comics Presents #78 and Swamp Thing (vol. 2) #39	Marv Wolfman	George Pérez	544	Oct 21, 2025	Crisis on Infinite Earths #1	978-1799503040
Crisis on Infinite Earths	Part Two	1985–1999	Crisis on Infinite Earths #5, and more: Swamp Thing (vol. 2) #44–46; Superman #413; Wonder Woman #328–329; DC Comics Presents #86, 95; Infinity, Inc. #20–22, Annual #1; All-Star Squadron #53–56; The New Teen Titans (vol. 2) #13–14; Legends of the DC Universe: Crisis on Infinite Earths #1	Marv Wolfman	George Pérez	576	Aug 18, 2026	Crisis on Infinite Earths #5	978-1799510284
Crisis on Infinite Earths	Part Three	1985–1986	Crisis on Infinite Earths #6–9, and more: Superman #414–415; DC Comics Presents #87–88; Infinity, Inc. #23–24; Justice League of America #245, Annual #3; Green Lantern (vol. 2) #195–196; Legion of Super-Heroes (vol. 3) #16, #18; The Vigilante #22; The Omega Men #31; Blue Devil #17–18	Marv Wolfman	George Pérez	576	Nov 17, 2026	Crisis on Infinite Earths #7	978-1799510314
Crisis on Infinite Earths	Part Four	1985–2001	Crisis on Infinite Earths #10–12, and more: All-Star Squadron #57–60; Amethyst: Princess of Gemworld #13; Blue Devil #19; Christmas with the Super-Heroes #2; DC Comics Presents #94; Green Lantern #197–198; History of the DC Universe #1–2; Infinity, Inc. #25; JLA: Incarnations #5; Secret Origins (vol. 2) Annual #2; Starman Annual #1; The Fury of Firestorm #42; The Omega Men #33; Who’s Who: The Definitive Directory of the DC Universe #10, 16–18	Marv Wolfman	George Pérez	576	Feb 9, 2027	Crisis on Infinite Earths #12	978-1799514855
Legends	Part One	1986–1987	Legends #1–3, and more: Infinity, Inc. #34–36; Hawkman #5–6; Secret Origins (vol. 2) #10; Crisis on Infinite Earths #12; Batman #401; Detective Comics #568; Justice League of America #258; Green Lantern Corps #207–208; The Fury of Firestorm (vol 2) #55–56; Blue Beetle (vol. 6) #9; Cosmic Boy #1–2; Booster Gold #13	John Ostrander, Paul Levitz	John Byrne, Luke McDonnell	504	Dec 15, 2026	Legends HC	978-1799509622
Zero Hour: Crisis in Time	Part One	1994	Zero Hour: Crisis in Time #4–3, and more: Superman #93; The Flash #94; L.E.G.I.O.N. #70; Green Lantern #55; Superman: The Man of Steel #37; Team Titans #24; The Darkstars #24; Valor #23; Batman #511; Batman: Shadow of the Bat #31; Detective Comics #678; Legionnaires #18; Hawkman #13; Showcase '94 #8–9; Steel #8; Superboy #8; Outsiders #11	Dan Jurgens	Dan Jurgens, Jerry Ordway	496	Dec 10, 2024	Zero Hour Ad	978-1779528506
Zero Hour: Crisis in Time	Part Two	1994	Zero Hour: Crisis in Time #2–0, and more: The Flash #0; Green Arrow #90; Adventures of Superman #516; Justice League America #92; Action Comics #703; Justice League International #68; Legion of Super-Heroes #61; Green Lantern #0; Superman: The Man of Steel #0; Guy Gardner: Warrior #24; Justice League Task Force #16; Catwoman #14; Robin #10; Showcase '94 #10; Damage #0, 6; Anima #7	Dan Jurgens	Dan Jurgens, Jerry Ordway	558	May 6, 2025	Zero Hour Ad	978-1799501305

=== The Flash ===
Subtitle	Years covered	Issues collected	Writers	Artists	Pgs.	Pub. date	Cover source	ISBN
The Human Thunderbolt	1956–1961	Showcase #4, 8, 13–14; The Flash #105–123	Robert Kanigher, John Broome	Carmine Infantino, Joe Kubert	632	Nov 26, 2024	Showcase #4	978-1779528360
The Fastest Man Dead	1970–1974	The Flash #197–204, 206–212, 215–229; World's Finest Comics #198–199; The Brave and the Bold #99	Robert Kanigher, Cary Bates	Irv Novick	672	Mar 10, 2026	The Flash #209	978-1799503026

=== Fourth World ===
Subtitle	Years covered	Issues collected	Writers	Artists	Pgs.	Pub. date	Cover source	ISBN
When the Old Gods Die	1970–1971	The New Gods #1–3, and more: The Forever People #1–4; Mister Miracle #1–4; Superman's Pal, Jimmy Olsen #133–139, 141–143; pages from Superman #233 and Superman's Girl Friend, Lois Lane #111, 114–115	Jack Kirby	Jack Kirby, Vince Colletta	560	Jun 23, 2026	The New Gods #1	978-1799508311
The Storm of Battle	1971–1972	The New Gods #4–7 and more: The Forever People #5–8; Mister Miracle #5–8; Superman's Pal Jimmy Olsen #144–148, 150, 152; Superman's Girl Friend, Lois Lane #116–119; Superman (vol. 1) #244	Jack Kirby, Robert Kanighter	Jack Kirby, Werner Roth	560	Jun 22, 2027	a panel from New Gods #7	978-1799514985

=== Green Arrow ===
Subtitle	Years covered	Issues collected	Writers	Artists	Pgs.	Pub. date	Cover source	ISBN
The Longbow Hunters	1987–1988	Green Arrow: The Longbow Hunters #1–3; Green Arrow (vol. 2) #1–8, Annual #1; Detective Comics Annual #1; The Question #17–18, Annual #1	Mike Grell	Mike Grell, Ed Hannigan, Dick Giordano	544	Jan 21, 2025	Green Arrow (vol. 2) #1	978-1779529916
The Trial of Oliver Queen	1988–1989	Green Arrow (vol. 2) #9–20, Annual #2; The Question Annual #2; Secret Origins #38; Black Canary stories from Action Comics #609–616, 624–635	Mike Grell, Sharon Wright	Dan Jurgens, Ed Hannigan	632	Feb 10, 2026	Green Arrow (vol. 2) #12	978-1799510246

=== Green Lantern ===
Subtitle	Years covered	Issues collected	Writers	Artists	Pgs.	Pub. date	Cover source	ISBN
The Defeat of Green Lantern	1963–1965	Green Lantern (vol. 2) #19–39; The Flash (vol. 1) #143; The Brave and the Bold (vol. 1) #59	John Broome, Gardner Fox	Gil Kane, Joe Giella	600	Dec 3, 2024	Green Lantern (vol. 2) #26	978-1779528483
Earth's Other Green Lantern	1965–1968	Green Lantern (vol. 2) #40–61; The Flash (vol. 1) #168; The Brave and the Bold (vol. 1) #69	John Broome, Gardner Fox	Gil Kane, Sid Greene	600	Nov 18, 2025	Green Lantern (vol. 2) #59	978-1799503262
Hard-Traveling Heroes	1968–1971	Green Lantern (vol. 2) #62–82; The Flash (vol. 1) #191; World's Finest Comics #201	Dennis O'Neil, John Broome	Neal Adams, Gil Kane	601	Jul 28, 2026	Green Lantern (vol. 2) #76	978-1799510277
Setting Up Shop	1986–1987	Green Lantern Corps (vol. 1) #201–219; Tales of the Green Lantern Corps Annual #2–3; Secret Origins (vol. 2) #7; Action Comics #589	Steve Englehart	Joe Staton, Ian Gibson	592	Oct 6, 2026	Green Lantern Corps (vol. 1) #201	978-1799510291

=== Harley Quinn ===
Subtitle	Years covered	Issues collected	Writers	Artists	Pgs.	Pub. date	Cover source	ISBN
Birth of the Mirth	1993–2001	Harley Quinn (vol. 1) #1–8, and more: Action Comics #765; Batman: Legends of the Dark Knight #126; The Batman Adventures #12; Azrael: Agent of the Bat #60; Batman #570, 573–574; Batman: Shadow of the Bat #93; Detective Comics #737, 740–741; Catwoman #82–84, 89; The Batman Adventures: Mad Love #1; Batman: Harley Quinn #1; Batman: Gotham Knights #14	Paul Dini, Karl Kesel	Bruce Timm	624	Feb 18, 2025	The Batman Adventures: Mad Love 2nd printing	978-1799500483
The Ballad of Harley Quinn	2001–2003	Harley Quinn (vol. 1) #9–25; Harley Quinn: Our Worlds at War #1; Harley and Ivy: Love on the Lam #1; Gotham Girls #1–5	Karl Kesel	Terry Dodson, Rachel Dodson	616	Sep 1, 2026	Harley Quinn #14	978-1799509127

=== Hawkman ===
Subtitle	Years covered	Issues collected	Writers	Artists	Pgs.	Pub. date	Cover source	ISBN
Wings Across Time	1961–1966	The Brave and The Bold #34–36, #42–44, 51; Mystery in Space #87–90; The Atom #7; Hawkman #1–11	Gardner Fox	Joe Kubert, Murphy Anderson	560	Aug 19, 2025	The Brave and the Bold #35	978-1799502500

=== Hitman ===
Subtitle	Years covered	Issues collected	Writers	Artists	Pgs.	Pub. date	Cover source	ISBN
A Rage in Arkham	1993–1997	Hitman #1–14; The Demon (vol. 3) #42–45, 52–54, Annual #2; The Batman Chronicles #4; pages from JLA #5	Garth Ennis	John McCrea	584	Apr 20, 2027	Hitman #1	978-1799514916

=== The Joker ===
Subtitle	Years covered	Issues collected	Writers	Artists	Pgs.	Pub. date	Cover source	ISBN
The Last Ha Ha	1969–1981 (Note: While The Joker #10 went unpublished until 2019, the solicitation only mentions 1969 to 1981.)	The Joker (vol. 1) #1–10, and more: Batman #251, 260, 286, 291–294, 321; Detective Comics #475–476, 504; Justice League of America (vol. 1) #77; Wonder Woman (vol. 1) #280–283; The Brave and the Bold (vol. 1) #111, 118, 129–130, 141	Dennis O'Neil, Bob Haney, Elliot S. Maggin	Frank Springer, John Calnan	552	Apr 28, 2026	Batman #251	978-1799510253

=== Justice League of America ===
Subtitle	Years covered	Issues collected	Writers	Artists	Pgs.	Pub. date	Cover source	ISBN
Starro the Conqueror	1960–1963	The Brave and the Bold (vol. 1) #28–30; Justice League of America (vol. 1) #1–19; Mystery in Space #75	Gardner Fox	Mike Sekowsky, Sid Greene, Bernard Sachs	624	Mar 31, 2026	The Brave And The Bold #28	978-1799507734
The Bridge Between Earths	1966–1969	Justice League of America (vol. 1) #45–72	Gardner Fox	Mike Sekowsky, Sid Greene, Dick Dillin	616	Nov 19, 2024	Justice League of America #56	978-1779528377
Crisis on Earth-X	1972–1976	Justice League of America (vol. 1) #103–132	Len Wein, Gerry Conway	Dick Dillin	624	Aug 4, 2026	Justice League of America #107	978-1799508830
The Return	1985–1986	Justice League of America (vol. 1) #241–261, Annual #3; Infinity, Inc. (vol. 1) #19	Gerry Conway	Luke McDonnell, Bill Wray	584	Aug 5, 2025	Justice League of America: The Detroit Era omnibus	978-1799502449

=== Justice Society of America ===
Subtitle	Years covered	Issues collected	Writers	Artists	Pgs.	Pub. date	Cover source	ISBN
For America and Democracy	1940–1942	All-Star Comics (vol. 1) #3–12	Gardner Fox	Sheldon Mayer, Jack Burnley	632	Dec 3, 2024	All-Star Comics #4	978-1779528476
The Plunder of the Psycho-Pirate	1942–1945	All-Star Comics (vol. 1) #13–24	Gardner Fox	Joe Gallagher, Stan Aschmeier	600	Jul 8, 2025	All-Star Comics #23	978-1799502074

=== Legion of Super-Heroes ===
Subtitle	Years covered	Issues collected	Writers	Artists	Pgs.	Pub. date	Cover source	ISBN
Zap Goes the Legion	1968–1974	Action Comics #378–387, 389–392; Adventure Comics #374–380, 403; Superboy #172–173, 176, 183–184, 188, 190–191, 193, 195, 197–203	Jim Shooter, Cary Bates	Win Mortimer, Dave Cockrum	584	Dec 10, 2024	Superboy #197	978-1779528490
The Great Darkness Saga	1981–1983	The Legion of Super-Heroes (vol. 2) #284–300, Annual #1; DC Comics Presents #43, 59; World’s Finest Comics #283–284; The Best of DC #24; The Brave and the Bold (vol. 1) #198; DC Sampler #1	Paul Levitz	Keith Giffen, Pat Broderick	648	Mar 30, 2027	Legion of Super-Heroes (vol. 2) #294	978-1799514886

=== Metamorpho ===
Subtitle	Years covered	Issues collected	Writers	Artists	Pgs.	Pub. date	Cover source	ISBN
The Element Man	1965–1972	Metamorpho #1–17; Justice League of America (vol. 1) #42; The Brave and the Bold (vol. 1) #57–58, 66, 68, 88, 101	Bob Haney	Ramona Fradon, Sal Trapani, Joe Orlando, Mike Sekowsky, Jim Aparo	592	Jun 17, 2025	Metamorpho #13	978-1799501848
How to Make a Super-Hero	1972–1991	1st Issue Special #3 and more: Action Comics #413–418; World's Finest Comics #217–220, 224, 226, 229; The Brave and the Bold (vol. 1) #123, 154; DC Comics Presents #40; Justice League Europe #5, 11–12; Batman and the Outsiders #1–2, 16–18, 24, Annual #2; The Outsiders #4, 18, 20–22, 25–27; Who's Who: The Definitive Directory of the DC Universe #15, 17; Who's Who #2; Who's Who Update 1987 #5 pages from: Justice League of America (vol. 1) #101; Batman and the Outsiders #19, 25; The Outsiders #19; Millennium #1; Invasion! #3; Justice League Europe #2, 4; pinups from The Outsiders #6, 13	various	various	512	Apr 27, 2027	Pinup from The Outsiders #6	978-1799514923

=== Peacemaker ===
Subtitle	Years covered	Issues collected	Writers	Artists	Pgs.	Pub. date	Cover source	ISBN
Kill For Peace	1966–1993	The Peacemaker (Charlton Comics) #1–5, and more: Peacemaker (DC Comics) #1–4; Fightin' Five #40–41; Suicide Squad (vol. 1) #27–30; Checkmate #16–26, 28, 32–33; Eclipso #11–13; The Vigilante #36–38, 41–43	Joe Gill, Paul Kupperberg	Pat Boyette	640	Apr 1, 2025	The Peacemaker (1966) #1	978-1799500988

=== Plastic Man ===
Subtitle	Years covered	Issues collected	Writers	Artists	Pgs.	Pub. date	Cover source	ISBN
The Origin of Plastic Man	1941–1944	Plastic Man stories from Police Comics #1–36; Plastic Man (vol. 1) #1–2	Jack Cole	Jack Cole	584	Mar 4, 2025	Plastic Man #1	978-1799500650

=== The Question ===
Subtitle	Years covered	Issues collected	Writers	Artists	Pgs.	Pub. date	Cover source	ISBN
Zen and Violence	1967–1987	The Question #1–15, and more: Blue Beetle (vol. 5) #1–5; Americomics Special #1; Mysterious Suspense #1; Blue Beetle (vol. 6) #4–7; Who's Who Update '87 #4; Who's Who: The Definitive Directory of the DC Universe #19; The Charlton Bullseye #1, 5	Steve Ditko, Dennis O'Neil	Steve Ditko, Denys Cowan	600	Apr 27, 2027	The Question #4	978-1799514893

=== Robin ===
Subtitle	Years covered	Issues collected	Writers	Artists	Pgs.	Pub. date	Cover source	ISBN
The Origin of Robin	1964–1976	Batman #184, 192, 202, 213, 227, 229–231, 234–236, 239–242, 244–245, 248–250, 252, 254, 259; Detective Comics #342, 386, 390–391, 394–395, 398–403, 445, 447, 450–451; Superman's Pal: Jimmy Olsen #111, 130; World's Finest Comics #141, 147, 195, 200; The Batman Family #1, 3–5	Mike Friedrich, Elliot S. Maggin	Gil Kane, Irv Novick	424	Jun 16, 2026	Detective Comics #342	978-1799508298
The League of Crime	1976–1990	Batman #333–334, 337–339, 341–343; Detective Comics #481–495; The Batman Family #4, 6–9, 11–20; DC Comics Presents #58; Secret Origins (vol. 2) #50	various	various	544	May 4, 2027	The Batman Family #8	978-1799519911

=== Sgt. Rock ===
Subtitle	Years covered	Issues collected	Writers	Artists	Pgs.	Pub. date	Cover source	ISBN
The Rock of Easy Co.	1959–1962	G.I. Combat #68; Our Army at War #81–122	Robert Kanigher, Bob Haney	Joe Kubert	616	May 19, 2026	Our Army at War #98 (Note: Book was originally shown using Our Army at War #83 as the cover.)	978-1799508090

=== The Spectre ===
Subtitle	Years covered	Issues collected	Writers	Artists	Pgs.	Pub. date	Cover source	ISBN
The Wrath of the Spectre	1966–1983	The Spectre #1–10, and more: Adventure Comics #431–440; Showcase #60–61, #64; The Brave and the Bold #72, #75, #116, #180, #199; All-Star Squadron #27–28; Ghosts #97–99	Gardner Fox, Michael Fleisher	Murphy Anderson, Jim Aparo	652	Sep 16, 2025	The Spectre #1	978-1799502814

=== Static ===
Subtitle	Years covered	Issues collected	Writers	Artists	Pgs.	Pub. date	Cover source	ISBN
Playing With Fire	1993–1994	Static #1–15; Superman: The Man of Steel #36; Superboy #7; Worlds Collide #1	Dwayne McDuffie, Robert L. Washington III	John Paul Leon	480	Oct 7, 2025	Static #1	978-1799502944

=== Suicide Squad ===
Subtitle	Years covered	Issues collected	Writers	Artists	Pgs.	Pub. date	Cover source	ISBN
Trial by Fire	1986–1988	Suicide Squad (vol. 1) #1–10, and more: Secret Origins (vol. 2) #14; Detective Comics #582; The Fury of Firestorm #62–64, Annual #5; Legends #1–6; pages from Millennium #4	John Ostrander, Len Wein	Luke McDonnell, John Byrne, Joe Brozowski	560	Mar 11, 2025	Suicide Squad #2	978-1799500759
The Nightshade Odyssey	1988–1989	Suicide Squad (vol. 1) #11–20, Annual #1, and more: Doom Patrol and Suicide Squad Special #1; Checkmate (vol. 1) #1, 8; Justice League International (vol. 1) #13; Manhunter #1, 6; Secret Origins (vol. 2) #28, 37; Deadshot #1–4; The Flash (vol. 2) #12	John Ostrander, Kim Yale	Luke McDonnell	592	Jul 21, 2026	Suicide Squad #14	978-1799508595

=== Super Friends ===
Subtitle	Years covered	Issues collected	Writers	Artists	Pgs.	Pub. date	Cover source	ISBN
The Fury of the Super Foes	1976–1979	Super Friends #1–26; stories from Limited Collectors' Edition #41, #46	E. Nelson Bridwell	Ramona Fradon, Bob Smith	512	Nov 4, 2025	Super Friends #1	978-1799503163

=== Superboy ===
Subtitle	Years covered	Issues collected	Writers	Artists	Pgs.	Pub. date	Cover source	ISBN
The Super-Dog from Krypton	1954–1955	Adventure Comics #199–216; Superboy (vol. 1) #33–43	Otto Binder	John Sikela, Curt Swan	544	May 13, 2025	Adventure Comics #210	978-1799501367

=== Supergirl ===
Subtitle	Years covered	Issues collected	Writers	Artists	Pgs.	Pub. date	Cover source	ISBN
The Girl of Steel	1959–1962	Supergirl stories from: Action Comics #252–288; Adventure Comics #278; Superman (vol. 1) #139–140, 144; Superboy (vol. 1) #80; Superman's Girl Friend, Lois Lane #14, 20; Superman's Pal Jimmy Olsen #40, 46, 51, 57	Otto Binder, Jerry Siegel	Jim Mooney	624	Jan 14, 2025	Action Comics #252	978-1779529909
Body & Soul	1996–1998	Supergirl (vol. 4) #1–18. Annual #1–2; Supergirl Plus #1; tales from Showcase '96 #8	Peter David	Gary Frank, Leonard Kirk	568	Oct 14, 2025	Supergirl Vol. 4 #9	978-1799510260
Die and Let Live	1998–1999	Supergirl (vol. 4) #19–35, 1000000; Resurrection Man #16–17; Supergirl/Prysm Double-Shot #1; tales from Adventure Comics 80-Page Giant #1, Team Superman #1, and Team Superman Secret Files #1	Peter David	Leonard Kirk, Robin Riggs	576	May 26, 2026	Supergirl Vol. 4 #22	978-1799513605

=== Superman ===
Subtitle	Years covered	Issues collected	Writers	Artists	Pgs.	Pub. date	Cover source	ISBN
The First Superhero	1938–1940	Superman (vol. 1) #1–5; Superman stories from: Action Comics #1–25; New York World's Fair Comics #1	Jerry Siegel	Joe Shuster, Paul Cassidy	584	Nov 5, 2024	Action Comics #1	978-1779528339
The Invisible Luthor	1940–1941	Superman (vol. 1) #6–11; Superman stories from: Action Comics #26–40; New York World's Fair Comics #2; World's Best Comics #1; World's Finest Comics #2–3	Jerry Siegel	Joe Shuster, Jack Burnley, Paul Cassidy, Wayne Boring, Leo Nowak	600	Dec 2, 2025	Action Comics #36	978-1799503323
The Last Days of Superman	1950–1951	Superman (vol. 1) #64–70; Action Comics #144–159; World's Finest Comics #46–53	Al Plastino, Alvin Schwartz, Edmond Hamilton, Jack Schiff	Al Plastino, Wayne Boring	576	TBC (formerly Feb 17, 2026)	Action Comics #153	978-1799507420
Kryptonite Nevermore	1970–1971	Superman (vol. 1) #233–238, 240–246; Action Comics #393–406	Dennis O'Neil, Leo Dorfman	Curt Swan, Murphy Anderson	576	Jun 3, 2025	Superman (vol. 1) #233	978-1799501657
The Krypton Connection	1973–1974	Superman (vol. 1) #261–277 and more: Action Comics #421–437; Aurora Comics Scenes #185–140; Limited Collectors' Edition #C–31; Secret Origins (vol. 1) #1; Wanted: The World's Most Dangerous Villains #9; The Amazing World of Superman, Metropolis Edition #1; 100–Page Super Spectacular #DC–18	Cary Bates, Elliot S! Maggin	Curt Swan	616	May 11, 2027	Superman (vol. 1) #271	978-1799514930
The Man of Steel	1986–1987	Superman (vol. 2) #1–6; Action Comics #584–588; Adventures of Superman #424–429; The Man of Steel #1–6; Legends #6; pages from: Legends #1–5; Hawkman (vol. 2) #10	John Byrne, Marv Wolfman	John Byrne, Jerry Ordway	632	Nov 10, 2026	Superman: The Man of Steel Vol. 1 HC	978-1799510321
Time and Time Again	1990–1991	Superman (vol. 2) #49–56; Action Comics #659–666; Adventures of Superman #472–479; Starman (vol. 1) #28	Dan Jurgens, Jerry Ordway, Roger Stern	Dan Jurgens, Jerry Ordway, Bob McLeod	600	Mar 24, 2026	Action Comics #664	978-1799508106

=== Superman Family ===
Subtitle	Years covered	Issues collected	Writers	Artists	Pgs.	Pub. date	Cover source	ISBN
The Giant Turtle Man	1960–1961	Action Comics #266, 277; Superman (vol. 1) #142–143, 147; Superman's Girl Friend, Lois Lane #19–28; Superman's Pal Jimmy Olsen #47–56; Superboy (vol. 1) #87, 90, 92	Robert Bernstein, Jerry Siegel	Curt Swan, Kurt Schaffenberger	664	Apr 15, 2025	Superman's Pal Jimmy Olsen #53	978-1799501107
The Stray Superdog	1974–1977	Action Comics #436, 438, 440–441, 461–462, 465, 467–468, 472, 475; Superman (vol. 1) #271, 275, 279, 282, 286–287; Superman's Girl Friend, Lois Lane #136–137; Superman's Pal Jimmy Olsen #163; The Superman Family #164, 166–167, 169–170, 172–173, 175–176, 178–179, 181–186	Cary Bates	Curt Swan, Kurt Schaffenberger	664	Apr 13, 2027	The Superman Family #182	978-1799514879

=== Swamp Thing ===
Subtitle	Years covered	Issues collected	Writers	Artists	Pgs.	Pub. date	Cover source	ISBN
The Man Who Would Not Die	1971–1976	The House of Secrets #92, 140; Swamp Thing #1–22; The Phantom Stranger (vol. 2) #14; The Brave and the Bold #122	Len Wein	Bernie Wrightson, Nestor Redondo	544	Dec 1, 2026	Swamp Thing #1	978-1799509837

=== Team-Ups ===
Subtitle	Years covered	Issues collected	Writers	Artists	Pgs.	Pub. date	Cover source	ISBN
The Impossible Escape	1973–1976	The Brave and the Bold (vol. 1) #106–130; Super-Team Family #2–3	Bob Haney	Jim Aparo	560	Jun 9, 2026	The Brave and the Bold #118	978-1799508304
Chase to the End of Time	1978–1979	DC Comics Presents #1–14; The Brave and the Bold (vol. 1) #141–155	Bob Haney, Martin Pasko	Jim Aparo, José Luis García-López	560	Mar 18, 2025	DC Comics Presents #1	978-1799500827

=== Teen Titans ===
Subtitle	Years covered	Issues collected	Writers	Artists	Pgs.	Pub. date	Cover source	ISBN
Terra in the Night!	1982–1983	The New Teen Titans (vol. 1) #21–32, Annual #1; Tales of the New Teen Titans #1–4; The New Teen Titans (Drug Awareness) #1–3; Action Comics #536	Marv Wolfman	George Pérez	568	Oct 27, 2026	The New Teen Titans #27	978-1799509332
The Judas Contract	1983–1984	The New Teen Titans (vol. 1) #33–40; Annual #2; Tales of the Teen Titans #41–47; Annual #3; Action Comics #546; World's Finest Comics #300; The Vigilante #3; Batman and the Outsiders #5	Marv Wolfman	George Pérez	560	Feb 4, 2025	Tales of the Teen Titans #44	978-1799500254

=== The Warlord ===
Subtitle	Years covered	Issues collected	Writers	Artists	Pgs.	Pub. date	Cover source	ISBN
This Savage World	1975–1980	Warlord (vol. 1) #1–36; 1st Issue Special #8	Mike Grell	Mike Grell	688	Feb 16, 2027	Warlord (vol. 1) #29	978-1799503378

=== Wonder Woman ===
Subtitle	Years covered	Issues collected	Writers	Artists	Pgs.	Pub. date	Cover source	ISBN
Introducing Wonder Woman	1942–1943	Wonder Woman (vol. 1) #1–4; All Star Comics (vol. 1) #8; Sensation Comics (vol. 1) #1–18; Comic Cavalcade #1–2	William Moulton Marston	H. G. Peter	528	Dec 9, 2025	Sensation Comics #1	978-1799503361
Enter the Cheetah	1943–1944	Wonder Woman (vol. 1) #5–9; Sensation Comics (vol. 1) #19–34; Comic Cavalcade #3–7; All Star Comics (vol. 1) #20	William Moulton Marston	H. G. Peter	536	Feb 3, 2026	Wonder Woman (vol. 1) #6	978-1799507444
Judgment in Infinity!	1981–1983	Wonder Woman (vol. 1) #280–305; The New Teen Titans (vol. 1) #11–12; story from DC Comics Presents #41; Superman in "The Computer Masters of Metropolis"	various	various	600	Jan 19, 2027	Wonder Woman (vol. 1) #301	978-1799515081
The Legend of Wonder Woman	1983–1986	Wonder Woman (vol. 1) #306–329; DC Comics Presents #76; Blue Devil #10; The Legend of Wonder Woman (1986) #1–4	Dan Mishkin, Kurt Busiek	Don Heck, Trina Robbins	632	Jul 1, 2025	The Legend of Wonder Woman #1	978-1799502012
Origins & Omens	2007–2009	Wonder Woman (vol. 3) #14–35; Outsiders: Five of a Kind - Wonder Woman/Grace #1; The Brave and the Bold (vol. 3) #7	Gail Simone	Terry Dodson, Aaron Lopresti, Bernard Chang	584	Nov 12, 2024	Wonder Woman (vol. 3) #16	978-1779528346
Dawn Before Darkness	2009–2010	Wonder Woman (vol. 3) #36–44, 600; Secret Six (vol. 3) #10–14; Blackest Night: Wonder Woman #1–3; DCU Halloween Special '09 #1	Gail Simone	Nicola Scott	456	May 12, 2026	Wonder Woman (vol. 3) #43	978-1799508113

== Genre volumes ==
=== Horror ===
Subtitle	Years covered	Issues collected	Writers	Artists	Pgs.	Pub. date	Cover source	ISBN
The Devil's Doorway	1969–1970	Horror themed stories from: House of Secrets #81–85; House of Mystery #180–185; The Phantom Stranger #5; The Witching Hour #3–7; The Unexpected #113–117	Gerry Conway, Marv Wolfman	Alex Toth, Bernie Wrightson	560	Sep 9, 2025	House of Secrets #84	978-1799502807
Where Dead Men Walk	1970–1971	Horror themed stories from: House of Secrets #86–90; House of Mystery #186–190; The Phantom Stranger #7; The Witching Hour #8–12; The Unexpected #118–123	Gerry Conway, Marv Wolfman	Alex Toth, Bernie Wrightson	544	Oct 13, 2026	House of Mystery #189	978-1799509325

=== Romance ===
Subtitle	Years covered	Issues collected	Writers	Artists	Pgs.	Pub. date	Cover source	ISBN
Escape From Loneliness	c. 1963	Romance themed stories from: Falling in Love #58–61; Girls' Romances #91–94; Girls' Love Stories #94–97; Heart Throbs #83–85; Secret Hearts #86–89	Robert Kanigher, Phyllis Reed	John Romita Sr., Mike Sekowsky	632	Jan 26, 2027	a panel from Secret Hearts #88	978-1799515074

=== Science fiction ===
Subtitle	Years covered	Issues collected	Writers	Artists	Pgs.	Pub. date	Cover source	ISBN
The Gorilla World	1953–1954	Sci-fi themed stories from: Action Comics #183–196; Strange Adventures #35–48; Mystery in Space #16–22	John Broome, Gardner Fox	Murphy Anderson	632	Jul 15, 2025	Strange Adventures #45	978-1799502159

=== War ===
Subtitle	Years covered	Issues collected	Writers	Artists	Pgs.	Pub. date	Cover source	ISBN
The Big Five Arrive	Jan. 1957– Apr. 1957	War themed stories from: Our Army at War #54–57; Star Spangled War Stories #53–56; G.I. Combat #44–47; Blackhawk #108–111; Our Fighting Forces #17–20; All-American Men of War #41–44	Robert Kanigher, Bob Haney	Joe Kubert, Ross Andru	632	Nov 11, 2025	Our Army at War #54 (Note: Book was originally shown using All-American Men of War #42 as the cover.)	978-1799503248

=== Western ===
Subtitle	Years covered	Issues collected	Writers	Artists	Pgs.	Pub. date	Cover source	ISBN
The Hangman Never Loses	1970–1972	Western themed stories from: All-Star Western (vol. 2) #2–8, 10–11; Weird Western Tales #12–17; Super DC Giant #15; Tomahawk #130–140	Robert Kanigher, John Albano	Joe Kubert, Tony DeZuniga	600	Apr 14, 2026	All-Star Western (vol. 2) #5	978-1799507727
Requiem for a Gunfighter	1973–1977	Western themed stories from: Weird Western Tales #18–43; Jonah Hex #1–7; Jonah Hex parody story from The Amazing World of DC Comics #13.	Michael Fleisher, John Albano	Tony DeZuniga, Dick Ayers, George Moliterni, José Luis García-López, Noly Panaligan	648	Jan 26, 2027	Weird Western Tales #17	978-1799517573

== Recent and upcoming releases ==
Line	Subtitle	Years covered	Pub. date	ISBN
Swamp Thing	The Man Who Would Not Die	1971–1976	Dec 1, 2026	978-1799509837
Batman	The Curse of Crime Alley	1979–1980	Dec 8, 2026	978-1799509615
Events	Legends Part One	1986–1987	Dec 15, 2026	978-1799509622
Catwoman	Creatures of the Night	1996–1998	Dec 22, 2026	978-1799509813
Batgirl	Silent Knight	1999–2000	Jan 5, 2027	978-1799515067
Wonder Woman	Judgement in Infinity!	1981–1983	Jan 19, 2027	978-1799515081
Romance	Escape From Loneliness	c. 1963	Jan 26, 2027	978-1799515074
Western	Requiem for a Gunfighter	1973–1977	Jan 26, 2027	978-1799517573
Events	Crisis on Infinite Earths Part Four	1985–2001	Feb 9, 2027	978-1799514855
The Warlord	This Savage World	1975–1980	Feb 16, 2027	978-1799503378
Legion of Super-Heroes	The Great Darkness Saga	1981–1983	Mar 30, 2027	978-1799514886
Batman	A Lonely Place of Dying	1989–1990	Apr 6, 2027	978-1799514909
Superman Family	The Stray Superdog	1974–1977	Apr 13, 2027	978-1799514879
Hitman	A Rage in Arkham	1993–1997	Apr 20, 2027	978-1799514916
Metamorpho	How to Make a Super-Hero	1972–1991	Apr 27, 2027	978-1799514923
The Question	Zen and Violence	1967–1987	Apr 27, 2027	978-1799514893
Robin	The League of Crime	1976–1990	May 4, 2027	978-1799519911
Superman	The Krypton Connection	1973–1974	May 11, 2027	978-1799514930
The Atom	Birth of the Atom	1961–1964	May 18, 2027	978-1799514954
Aquaman	The Haunted Sea	1962–1965	Jun 1, 2027	978-1799514961
Catwoman	To Catch a Thief	1998–1999	Jun 8, 2027	978-1799514978
Fourth World	The Storm of Battle	1971–1972	Jun 22, 2027	978-1799514985
Batman	Night of the Stalker	1972–1975	Sep 7, 2027	978-1799520016
Superman	The Last Days of Superman	1950–1951	TBA	978-1799507420

== See also ==
- DC Omnibus
- DC Compendium
- DC Compact Comics
- Marvel Omnibus
- Marvel Epic Collection
- Marvel Complete Collections
- Marvel Masterworks
