= Marvel Complete Collections =

Anthology comic book series

Marvel Complete Collections, Marvel Ultimate Collections, and Marvel Complete Epics are large full-color trade paperback collections of previously published Marvel comics, typically containing 300–500 pages.

The Complete Collection and Ultimate Collection lines collect entire runs of one title, or related titles by one creator, with the use of 'Ultimate' or 'Complete' largely interchangeable.

The Complete Epic line collects large crossovers spanning several titles. The initial book solicited was the first volume X-Men: Complete Age Of Apocalypse in January 2005, for a 30 March 2005 release.

A year later, and Marvel launched the Ultimate Collection line, with Ultimate X-Men Ultimate Collection Vol. 1. This combined the original first two trade paperbacks, into a larger volume.

Marvel also publish Epic Collections, which are for full runs of character titles.

Many of the Complete and Ultimate Collections are out-of-print, however some have been reskinned and reissued as Modern Era Epic Collections – which launched in summer 2023.

== Marvel Complete Collections and Marvel Ultimate Collections ==
=== Agents of Atlas ===
#	Issues collected	Pages	Publication date	ISBN
1	Agents of Atlas (vol. 1) #1–6; X-Men: First Class (vol. 1) #8; Wolverine: Agent of Atlas #1–3; Agents of Atlas (vol. 2) #1–5; Agents of Atlas: Menace from Space (prose story) and material from Spider-Man Family #4; Secret Invasion: Who Do You Trust? #1; Dark Reign: New Nation #1; Marvel Mystery Comics #82; Venus #1; Marvel Boy #1; Men's Adventures #26; Menace #11; Yellow Claw #1; What If #9	488	May 2018	978-1302911294
2	Agents of Atlas (2009) #6–11, X-Men vs. Agents of Atlas (2009) #1–2, Avengers vs. Atlas (2010) #1–4, Thunderbolts (1997) #139–140, and material from Assault on New Olympus: Prologue (2009) #1, Incredible Hercules (2007) #138–141, Hercules: Fall of an Avenger (2010) #1–2	448	February 4, 2020	978-1302922726

=== Alias ===
#	Issues collected	Pages	Publication date	ISBN
1	Alias #1–15	360	May 2009	978-0785137320
2	Alias #16–28	312	February 2010	978-0785144908

=== Annihilation ===
#	Issues collected	Pages	Publication date	ISBN
1	Drax the Destroyer #1–4; Annihilation Prologue, Annihilation: Nova #1–4; Annihilation: Silver Surfer #1–4; Annihilation: Super-Skrull #1–4	472	April 2018	978-1302912864
2	Annihilation: Ronan #1–4; Annihilation #1–6; Annihilation: Heralds of Galactus	408	May 2018	978-1302912871

=== Ant-Man ===
Issues Collected	Pages	Pages	ISBN
The Astonishing Ant-Man: The Complete Collection			
Ant-Man (2015) #1-5 and Annual #1, Ant-Man: Last Days #1 and Astonishing Ant-Man #1-13.	472	June 12, 2018	978-1302911324

=== Avengers ===
#	Issues collected	Pages	Publication date	ISBN
Avengers by Brian Michael Bendis				
1	Avengers Prime #1–5; Avengers (vol. 4) #1–12; New Avengers Annual (vol. 2) #1; Avengers Annual (vol. 4) #1	504	October 2017	978-1302907730
2	Avengers (vol. 4) #12.1, 13–24; Avengers Assemble : An Oral History of Earth's Mightiest Heroes	480	October 2017	978-1302907747
3	Avengers (vol. 4) #24.1, 25–34; Avengers Assemble (vol. 2) #1–8; Avengers: Heroes Welcome #1; material from AVX: VS #6	456	November 2017	978-1302907754
Avengers by Geoff Johns				
1	Avengers #57–63; Vision #1–4; Thor (vol. 2) #58; Iron Man (vol. 2) #64	312	June 2013	978-0785184331
2	Avengers #64–76	304	September 2013	978-0785184393
Avengers by Jonathan Hickman				
1	Avengers (2012) #1–5; New Avengers (2013) #1–6; Astonishing Tales: Mojo World	336	September 8, 2020	978-1302925093
2	Avengers (2012) #6–17; New Avengers (2013) #7; material from the Shang-Chi: Master of Kung Fu (2009) #1	344	November 25, 2020	978-1302925307
3	Avengers (2012) #18–23; New Avengers (2013) #8–12; Infinity (2013) #1–6	512	February 2, 2021	978-1302926472
4	Avengers (2012) #24–34; New Avengers (2013) #13–23	528	March 30, 2021	978-1302926489
5	Avengers (2012) #35–44; New Avengers (2013) #24–33	528	July 26, 2022	978-1302933517
Avengers Academy				
1	Avengers Academy #1–12; Avengers Academy Giant-Size #1; Thunderbolts (vol. 1) #147 and material from the Enter the Heroic Age one-shot	400	March 2018	978-1302909468
2	Avengers Academy #13–20; material from Amazing Spider-Man (1999) #661–662; Fear Itself: The Home Front #1–7; Avengers: Solo #1–5	384	May 2018	978-1302909451
3	Avengers Academy #21–39	416	April 6, 2021	978-1302923143
Avengers Arena				
	Avengers Arena #1–18	408	September 11, 2018	978-1302911850
Avengers: The Initiative				
1	Avengers: The Initiative #1–19, Annual #1	496	March 2017	978-1302904111
2	Avengers: The Initiative #20–35; Avengers: The Initiative Special #1; Avengers: The Initiative featuring Reptil #1	456	August 2017	978-1302906870
Avengers: Earth's Mightiest Heroes				
	Avengers: Earth's Mightiest Heroes #1–8, Avengers: Earth's Mightiest Heroes II #1–8	376	March 2012	978-0785159377
Avengers Undercover				
	Avengers Undercover #1–10	224	November 2018	978-1302913939
Avengers World				
	Avengers World #1–21; Avengers (2012) #34.1–34.2 and material from All-New Marvel NOW! Point One	528	April 23, 2019	978-1302916176
Dark Avengers by Brian Michael Bendis				
	Dark Avengers #1–6, 9–16, Annual #1	416	December 2017	978-1302908010
Mighty Avengers by Brian Michael Bendis				
	Mighty Avengers (2007) #1–20	512	April 2017	978-1302903381
Mighty Avengers by Dan Slott				
	Mighty Avengers (2007) #21–36, Secret Invasion: Requiem	424	April 23, 2019	978-1302915667
New Avengers by Brian Michael Bendis				
1	Avengers (vol. 1) #500–503, #500 (Director's Cut), Avengers Finale, New Avengers #1–10, #1 (Director's Cut), New Avengers: Most Wanted Files	504	January 2017	978-1302903626
2	New Avengers #11–25, Annual #1; New Avengers: Illuminati; Giant-Size Spider-Woman #1; Civil War: The Confession	496	February 2017	978-1302903633
3	Civil War: The Initiative; New Avengers #26–37, Annual #2; New Avengers: Illuminati (vol. 2) #1–5	496	March 2017	978-1302903640
4	New Avengers #38–54; Secret Invasion: Dark Reign	480	May 2017	978-1302908652
5	Free Comic Book Day (2009); New Avengers #55–64, Annual #3; Dark Reign: The List – Avengers One Shot; New Avengers Finale and material from Amazing Spider-Man #601 and Breaking Into Comics the Marvel Way	408	June 2017	978-1302908669
6	New Avengers (2010) #1–16	392	July 2017	978-1302908676
7	New Avengers (2010) #16.1, 17–34	440	August 2017	978-1302908683
Secret Avengers by Ed Brubaker				
	Secret Avengers (2010) #1–12	304	June 2018	978-1302912192
Secret Avengers by Rick Remender				
	Secret Avengers (2010) #21.1, 22–37	384	April 2, 2019	978-1302916435

=== Black Panther ===
#	Issues collected	Pages	Publication date	ISBN
Black Panther by Christopher Priest
1	Black Panther (1998) #1–17	416	August 2015	978-0785192671
2	Black Panther (1998) #18–35; Deadpool #44	448	December 2015	978-0785198116
3	Black Panther (1998) #36–49, 57–58; Incredible Hulk (2000) #33; Thor (1966) #370; and material from Marvel Double-Shot #2	456	April 2016	978-0785195085
4	Black Panther (1998) #50–56, 59–62; The Crew #1–7	416	August 2016	978-1302900588
Black Panther by Reginald Hudlin
1	Black Panther (2005) #1–18; X-Men (1991) #175–176	496	November 2017	978-1302907716
2	Black Panther (2005) #19–34, Annual #1	424	January 2018	978-1302909475
3	Black Panther (2005) #35–41; Black Panther (2009) #1–6; Black Panther/Captain America: Flags of Our Fathers #1–4; Black Panther Saga	440	February 2018	978-1302910358
Black Panther: Doomwar
	Black Panther (2009) #7–12; Doomwar #1–6; Klaws of the Panther #1–4 and material from Age of Heroes #4	408	January 2017	978-1302904166
Black Panther: The Man Without Fear
	Black Panther: The Man Without Fear #513–523; Black Panther: The Most Dangerous Man Alive #523.1, 524–529	416	December 2017	978-1302907723

=== Black Widow ===
#	Issues collected	Pages	Publication date	ISBN
Marvel Knights Black Widow by Grayson and Rucka
	Black Widow (1999) #1–3; Black Widow (2001) #1–3; Black Widow: Pale Little Spider #1–3	224	October 23, 2018	978-1302914004
Black Widow by Waid and Samnee
	Black Widow (2016) #1–12	272	March 17, 2020	978-1302921293

=== Blade ===
#	Issues collected	Pages	Publication date	ISBN
Blade by Marc Guggenheim
	Blade (2006) #1–12, Wolverine vs. Blade Special (2019) #1	328	March 10, 2020	978-1302923204

=== Cable & Deadpool ===
#	Issues collected	Pages	Publication date	ISBN
1	Cable & Deadpool #1–18	424	February 2010	978-0785143130
2	Cable & Deadpool #19–35	416	June 2010	978-0785148210
3	Cable & Deadpool #36–50; Deadpool/GLI: Summer Fun Spectacular	424	September 2010	978-0785149200

=== Captain America ===
#	Issues collected	Pages	Publication date	ISBN
Captain America: Theater of War
	Captain America Theater of War: America the Beautiful, A Brother In Arms, To Soldier On, Ghosts of My Country, America First!, Operation Zero Point, Prisoners of Duty	280	May 2016	978-0785196013
Captain America: Heroes Return
1	Captain America (1998) #1–12, Iron Man/Captain America Annual 1998, and Captain America/Citizen V Annual 1998	416	February 2, 2021	978-1302923242
2	Captain America (1998) #13–24, Annual 1999	368	February 2, 2022	978-1302931711
Captain America and the Falcon by Christopher Priest
	Captain America and the Falcon (2004) #1–14	328	March 2016	978-0785195269
Captain America: Winter Soldier
	Captain America (vol. 5) #1–9, 11–14	304	March 2010	978-0785143413
Captain America: Red Menace
	Captain America (vol. 5) #15–21; Captain America 65th Anniversary Special	216	June 2011	978-0785156178
Captain America: Sam Wilson
1	Captain America (2012) #25, All-New Captain America: Fear Him (2015) #1–4, All-New Captain America (2014) #1–6, Amazing Spider-Man Special (2015) #1, Inhuman Special (2015) #1, All-New Captain America Special (2015) #1, Captain America: Sam Wilson (2015) #1–6	488	February 4, 2020	978-1302922979
2	Captain America: Sam Wilson (2015) #7–24, Captain America (2017) #25, Generations: Sam Wilson Captain America & Steve Rogers Captain America #1	504	January 5, 2021	978-1302922971
Captain America: The Death of Captain America
	Captain America (vol. 5) #22–42; Winter Soldier: Winter Kills	568	February 2013	978-0785183792
Captain America and the Avengers
	Captain America and Hawkeye #629–632; Captain America and Iron Man #633–635; Captain America and Namor #635.1; Captain America and Black Widow #636–640	296	July 2017	978-1302908584
Steve Rogers: Super-Soldier
	Steve Rogers: Super-Soldier #1–4, Annual #1; Uncanny X-Men Annual (2006) #3; Namor: The First Mutant Annual #1	216	July 2017	978-1302908737

=== Captain Marvel ===
#	Issues collected	Pages	Publication date	ISBN
Captain Marvel by Jim Starlin
	Captain Marvel #25–34; Iron Man #55; Marvel Feature #12; Marvel Graphic Novel No. 1: The Death of Captain Marvel and material from Daredevil #105 and Life of Captain Marvel #1–5	352	December 2016	978-1302900175

=== The Champions Classic ===
#	Issues collected	Pages	Publication date	ISBN
	Champions #1–17; Iron Man Annual #4; Avengers #163; Super-Villain Team-Up #14; Peter Parker, the Spectacular Spider-Man #17–18; Hulk Annual #7	472	June 2018	978-1302911805

=== Daken ===
#	Issues collected	Pages	Publication date	ISBN
Daken: Dark Wolverine - Punishment
	Dark Wolverine #75–89, Saga; Dark Reign: The List Punisher; Wolverine: Origins #47–48; Franken-Castle #19–20	496	July 2017	978-1302906863

=== Damage Control ===
#	Issues collected	Pages	Publication date	ISBN
	Damage Control (vol. 1) #1–4; Damage Control (vol. 2) #1–4; Damage Control (vol. 3) #1–4; WWH Aftersmash: Damage Control #1–3 and material from Marvel Age Annual #4 and Marvel Comics Presents #19	392	October 2015	978-0785197904

=== Daredevil ===
#	Issues collected	Pages	Publication date	ISBN
Daredevil by Brian Michael Bendis and Alex Maleev
1	Daredevil (vol. 2) #16–19, 26–40	480	June 2010	978-0785143888
2	Daredevil (vol. 2) #41–50, 56–65	512	September 2010	978-0785149507
3	Daredevil (vol. 2) #66–81, What If Karen Page Had Lived? and Ultimate Marvel Team-Up #6–8	512	November 2010	978-0785149514
Daredevil by Ed Brubaker and Michael Lark
1	Daredevil (vol. 2) #82–93	304	February 2012	978-0785163343
2	Daredevil (vol. 2) #94–105	304	June 2012	978-0785163350
3	Daredevil (vol. 2) #106–119; Daredevil (vol. 1) #500	384	October 2012	978-0785163367

=== Darkhold ===
#	Issues collected	Pages	Publication date	ISBN
Darkhold: Pages From the Book of Sins
	Darkhold: Pages From the Book of Sins #1–16; Doctor Strange, Sorcerer Supreme #90 and material from Midnight Sons Unlimited #1–2 and Marvel Comics Presents (1988) #145	464	October 2018	978-1302913953

=== Deadpool ===
#	Issues collected	Pages	Publication date	ISBN
Deadpool by Joe Kelly
1	Deadpool (1997) #1–11, -1; Daredevil/Deadpool Annual '97; Amazing Spider-Man (1963) #47	432	November 19, 2019	978-1302920616
2	Deadpool (1997) #0, 12–20; Deadpool And Death Annual ’98; Baby's First Deadpool Book #1; Encyclopaedia Deadpoolica #1	384	February 23, 2021	978-1302923341
Deadpool by Daniel Way
1	Deadpool (2008) #1–12; Wolverine: Origins #21–25; Thunderbolts #130–131; Deadpool Saga	472	August 2013	978-0785185321
2	Deadpool (2008) #13–31	464	December 2013	978-0785185475
3	Deadpool (2008) #32–49 and #33.1, 49.1	448	May 2014	978-0785188889
4	Deadpool (2008) #50–63	320	August 2014	978-0785160120
Deadpool by Posehn and Duggan
1	Deadpool (2012) #1–14, 20, 26	384	January 2018	978-1302910099
2	Deadpool (2012) #15–19, 21–25; Deadpool: Dracula's Gauntlet #1–7	424	March 2018	978-0785185475
3	Deadpool (2012) #27–34; Hawkeye vs. Deadpool #0–4	384	July 2018	978-1302911393
4	Death of Wolverine: Deadpool & Captain America #1; Deadpool (2012) #35–45; Mrs. Deadpool and the Howling Commandos #1–4 and material from Deadpool Annual (2016) #1	376	September 11, 2018	978-1302911409

=== Deathlok the Demolisher ===
#	Issues collected	Pages	Publication date	ISBN
	Astonishing Tales #25–28 and #30–36; Marvel Team-Up #46; Marvel Spotlight #33; Marvel Two-in-One #27, 54; Captain America #286–288	368	October 2014	978-0785191124

=== Devil Dinosaur ===
#	Issues collected	Pages	Publication date	ISBN
	Devil Dinosaur #1–9	184	June 2014	978-0785190370

=== Doctor Strange ===
#	Issues collected	Pages	Publication date	ISBN
Doctor Strange: Damnation
	Damnation #1–4; Johnny Blaze: Ghost Rider #1; Doctor Strange #386–389; Iron Fist #78–80; Ben Reilly: Scarlet Spider #15–17	336	July 2018	978-1302912604

=== Doom 2099 ===
#	Issues collected	Pages	Publication date	ISBN
	Doom 2099 #24–39	424	March 2013	978-0785167549

=== Elektra ===
#	Issues collected	Pages	Publication date	ISBN
Elektra by Peter Milligan, Larry Hama and Mike Deodato Jr.
	Elektra (vol. 3) #1–19, -1	480	March 2017	978-1302904333
Elektra by Greg Rucka
	Elektra (vol. 2) #7–22 and material from Marvel Knights Double-Shot #3	384	July 2012	978-0785163930

=== Emma Frost ===
#	Issues collected	Pages	Publication date	ISBN
	Emma Frost #1–18	432	June 2011	978-0785155102

=== Eternals by Jack Kirby ===
#	Issues collected	Pages	Publication date	ISBN
	The Eternals (1976) #1–19, Annual #1	400	July 2020	978-1302922009

=== Exiles ===
#	Issues collected	Pages	Publication date	ISBN
1	Exiles #1–19	480	April 2009	978-0785138877
1	Exiles #1–19	480	October 2018	978-1302913991
2	Exiles #20–37; X-Men Unlimited #41	440	August 2009	978-0785138884
3	Exiles #38–58	496	December 2009	978-0785138891
4	Exiles #59–74; Age of Apocalypse Handbook	432	May 2010	978-0785138907
5	Exiles #75–89, Annual #1	392	September 2010	978-0785138914
6	Exiles #90–100; Exiles: Days of Then and Now; X-Men: Die by the Sword #1–5	416	December 2010	978-0785138921

=== Fantastic Four ===
#	Issues collected	Pages	Publication date	ISBN
Fantastic Four by Waid and Wieringo
1	Fantastic Four (vol. 3) #60–66; Avengers #400	208	June 2011	978-0785156550
2	Fantastic Four (vol. 3) #67–70, 500–502	160	August 2011	978-0785156581
3	Fantastic Four #503–513	272	November 2011	978-0785156574
4	Fantastic Four #514–524	256	January 2012	978-0785156611
Fantastic Four by Jonathan Hickman
1	Dark Reign: Fantastic Four #1–5; Fantastic Four (1998) #570–578 and material from Dark Reign: The Cabal One-Shot	384	September 4, 2018	978-1302913366
2	Fantastic Four (1998) #579–588; FF (2011) #1–5	432	September 10, 2019	978-1302919634
3	Fantastic Four (1998) #600–604; FF (2011) #6–16	480	May 8, 2021	978-1302926687
4	Fantastic Four (1998) #605–611 and 605.1; FF (2011) #17–23	368	January 17, 2023	978-1302933586
Fantastic Four: Heroes Return
1	Fantastic Four (1998) #1–15, ½, Annual '98; Iron Man (1998) #14	504	March 26, 2019	978-1302916237
2	Fantastic Four (1998) #16–32, Annual 1999-2000	496	March 24, 2020	978-1302923402
3	Fantastic Four (1998) #33–45, Inhumans (2000) #1–4 Fantastic 4th Voyage of Sinbad (2001) #1	456	August 24, 2021	978-1302930752
4	Fantastic Four (1998) #46–59, Annual 2001, Thing & She-Hulk: The Long Night (2002) #1	448	November 29, 2022	978-1302945930
Marvel Knights Fantastic Four by Aguirre-Sacasa, McNiven and Muniz
	Marvel Knights 4 #1–14; Hulk/Thing: Hard Knocks #1–4	424	April 9, 2019	978-1302916329

=== Franklin Richards: Son of a Genius ===
#	Issues collected	Pages	Publication date	ISBN
1	Son of a Genius; Everybody Loves Franklin; Super Summer Spectacular; Happy Franksgiving; March Madness; World Be Warned; Monster Mash; Fall Football Fiasco!	216	October 2010	978-0785149248
2	Spring Break; Not-So-Secret Invasion; Summer Smackdown; Sons of Geniuses; It's Dark Reigning Cats & Dogs; April Fools!; School's Out	184	December 2010	978-0785149255

=== Gambit ===
#	Issues collected	Pages	Publication date	ISBN
Gambit: King of Thieves
	Gambit (2012) #1–17 and material from A+X #3	376	May 21, 2019	978-1302917784
X-Men: Gambit
1	Gambit (1999) #½, 1–11; Annual '99; Marvel Authentix: Gambit #1 and material from X-Men Unlimited (1993) #18	432	March 2016	978-0785196853
2	Gambit (1999) #12–25; Annual 2000	408	December 2018	978-1302913755

=== Ghost Rider ===
#	Issues collected	Pages	Publication date	ISBN
Ghost Rider by Daniel Way
	Ghost Rider #1–19	448	January 2012	978-1302908089
Ghost Rider: Robbie Reyes
	All-New Ghost Rider (2014) #1–12, Ghost Rider (2016) #1–5, What If? Ghost Rider (2018) #1	432	April 20, 2021	978-1302925345

=== Guardians of the Galaxy ===
#	Issues collected	Pages	Publication date	ISBN
Guardians of the Galaxy by Abnett and Lanning
1	Guardians of the Galaxy #1–12	296	July 2014	978-0785190646
2	Guardians of the Galaxy #13–25	312	November 2014	978-0785190639
Rocket Raccoon and Groot
	Tales to Astonish #13; Incredible Hulk #271; Rocket Raccoon #1–4; Annihilators #1–4; Annihilators: Earthfall #1–4 and material from Marvel Preview #7	264	April 2013	978-0785167136

=== Hercules ===
#	Issues collected	Pages	Publication date	ISBN
Incredible Hercules
1	Incredible Hulk (2000) #106–112, Incredible Hercules #113–120, Hulk vs. Hercules: When Titans Collide, and material from Giant-Size Hulk (2006) #1, Amazing Fantasy (2004) #15, Incredible Hulk (2000) #100	464	August 13, 2019	978-1302918668
2	Incredible Hercules (2007) #121–137	440	March 30, 2021	978-1302923488

=== Howard the Duck ===
#	Issues collected	Pages	Publication date	ISBN
1	Fear #19; Man-Thing #1; Howard the Duck #1–16, Annual #1; Marvel Treasury Edition #12 and material from Giant-Size Man-Thing #4–5	456	July 2015	978-0785197768
2	Howard the Duck #17–31; Howard the Duck magazine #1	360	February 2016	978-0785196860
3	Howard the Duck magazine #2–7	384	August 2016	978-1302902049
4	Howard the Duck magazine #8–9, Marvel Team-Up #96; Howard the Duck #32–33; Sensational She-Hulk #14–17 and material from Bizarre Adventures #34, Marvel Tales #237 and Spider-Man Team-Up #5	384	October 10, 2017	978-1302908607

=== Hulk ===
#	Issues collected	Pages	Publication date	ISBN
Hulk by Jeph Loeb
1	Hulk #1–12; King-Size Hulk #1; Incredible Hulk #600; Wolverine #50	432	June 2013	978-0785185390
2	Hulk #13–24; Fall of the Hulks: Gamma #1	440	September 2013	978-0785185512
Hulk by Mark Waid and Gerry Duggan
	Hulk (2014) #1–16, Annual #1; Original Sin #3.1–3.4	504	September 4, 2018	978-1302913199
Incredible Hulk by Jason Aaron
	Incredible Hulk #1–7, 7.1, 8–15, Fear Itself #7	376	October 24, 2017	978-1302907921
Indestructible Hulk by Mark Waid
	Indestructible Hulk #1–20, Annual #1	504	October 10, 2017	978-1302908003
Skaar: Son of Hulk
	Planet Skaar Prologue #1; Skaar: Son of Hulk #1–12	432	July 2018	978-1302912475

=== Human Torch ===
#	Issues collected	Pages	Publication date	ISBN
Human Torch by Karl Kesel and Skottie Young
	Human Torch #1–12	272	August 2014	978-0785190981
The Human Torch and the Thing: Strange Tales
	Material from Strange Tales #101–134, Annual #2	520	August 28, 2018	978-1302913342

=== Infinity Wars ===
#	Issues collected	Pages	Publication date	ISBN
	Infinity Countdown Prime #1, Infinity Countdown #1–5, Infinity Countdown: Adam Warlock #1, Free Comic Book Day Amazing Spider-Man/Guardians of the Galaxy 2018 (Guardians of the Galaxy Saga), Infinity Wars Prime #1, Infinity Wars #1–6, Infinity Wars: Fallen Guardian #1, Infinity Wars: Infinity #1, Thanos Legacy #1 (B story)	592	October 1, 2019	978-1302914967

=== Iron Fist ===
#	Issues collected	Pages	Publication date	ISBN
Immortal Iron Fist
1	Immortal Iron Fist #1–16, Annual #1; Immortal Iron Fist: Orson Randall and the Green Mist of Death #1; Immortal Iron Fist: The Origin of Danny Rand #1; Civil War: Choosing Sides #1	496	December 2013	978-0785185420
2	Immortal Iron Fist #17–27; Immortal Iron Fist: Orson Randall and the Death Queen of California #1; Immortal Weapons #1–5; Immortal Weapons Sketchbook	496	June 2014	978-0785188902
Iron Fist: The Living Weapon
	Iron Fist: The Living Weapon #1–12	272	April 2017	978-1302904494
Iron Fist: Deadly Hands of Kung Fu
	Deadly Hands of Kung Fu (1974) #10, 18–24, 29, 31–33; Bizarre Adventures (1981) #25	368	March 12, 2019	978-1302916275

=== Iron Man ===
#	Issues collected	Pages	Publication date	ISBN
Iron Man: Director of S.H.I.E.L.D.
	Iron Man: Director of S.H.I.E.L.D. #15–32, Annual #1	472	May 2017	978-1302907044
Iron Man by Fraction and Larroca
	Invincible Iron Man (2008) #1–19	496	June 2019	978-1302916282
Iron Man: Heroes Return
1	Iron Man (1998) #1–14; Captain America (1998) #8; Quicksilver #10; Avengers (1998) #7; Iron Man/Captain America Annual '98; Fantastic Four (1998) #15	504	April 30, 2019	978-1302916060
2	Iron Man (1998) #15–25; Iron Man Annual '99; Thor (1998) #17; Peter Parker: Spider-Man (1999) #11; Juggernaut (1999) #1; Iron Man: The Iron Age (1998) #1–2	504	December 20, 2022	978-1302948245
Iron Man by Mike Grell
	Iron Man (1998) #50–69	512	March 2, 2021	978-1302926779

=== Invaders ===
#	Issues collected	Pages	Publication date	ISBN
Invaders
1	Giant-Size Invaders #1; Invaders #1–22, Annual #1; Marvel Premiere #29–30; Avengers #71	512	June 2014	978-0785190578
2	Invaders #23–41; Invaders (1993) #1–4; Giant-Size Invaders #2; What If #4	504	December 2014	978-0785190585

=== Jessica Jones ===
#	Issues collected	Pages	Publication date	ISBN
Jessica Jones: The Pulse
	The Pulse #1–9, 11–14; New Avengers Annual #1	360	September 2014	978-0785190868

=== Journey into Mystery ===
#	Issues collected	Pages	Publication date	ISBN
Journey into Mystery by Kieron Gillen
1	Journey into Mystery #622–636, 626.1	392	February 2014	978-0785185574
2	Journey into Mystery #637–645; Exiled #1; New Mutants #42–43; The Mighty Thor #18–22 and Annual #1	456	August 2014	978-0785185741
Sif: Journey into Mystery
	Sif #1; Journey into Mystery #646–655	248	August 2017	978-1302906832

=== Loki ===
#	Issues collected	Pages	Publication date	ISBN
Loki: Agent of Asgard
	Loki: Agent of Asgard (2014) #1–17, Original Sin (2014) #5.1–5.5 and material from All-New Marvel NOW! Point One (2014) #1	504	December 31, 2019	978-1302920739

=== Machine Man ===
#	Issues collected	Pages	Publication date	ISBN
Machine Man by Kirby and Ditko
	Machine Man (1978) #1–19; Incredible Hulk (1968) #235–237	440	August 2016	978-0785195771

=== Man-Thing ===
#	Issues collected	Pages	Publication date	ISBN
Man-Thing by Steve Gerber
1	Astonishing Tales #12–13; Fear #11–19; Marvel Two-in-One #1; Man-Thing (1974) #1–8 and material from Savage Tales #1, Fear #10 and Monsters Unleashed #5	440	October 2015	978-0785199052
2	Giant-Size Man-Thing #1–5; Daredevil (1964) #113–114; Man-Thing (1974) #9–18 and material from Monsters Unleashed #8–9	408	November 2016	978-1302902414
3	Man-Thing (1974) #19–22, Iron Man Annual (1970) #3, Howard the Duck (1976) #22–23; Infernal Man-Thing (2012) #1–3 and material from Rampaging Hulk (1977) #7, Web of Spider-Man Annual (1985) #4 and Marvel Comics Presents (1988) #1–12	408		978-1302927752

=== Man-Wolf ===
#	Issues collected	Pages	Publication date	ISBN
	Amazing Spider-Man (1963) #124–125, 189–190, Giant-Size Super Heroes #1, Creatures on the Loose #30–37, Marvel Premiere #45–46, Marvel Team-Up (1972) #36–37, Savage She-Hulk #13–14; Peter Parker, the Spectacular Spider-Man Annual #3	408	October 15, 2019	978-1302920005

=== Marvel Frontier Comics ===
#	Issues collected	Pages	Publication date	ISBN
	Children of the Voyager #1–4; Dances With Demons #1–4; Mortigan Goth: Immortalis #1–4; Bloodseed #1–2; Marvel Frontier Comics Unlimited #1	424	February 2016	978-0785199267

=== Marvel Mangaverse ===
#	Issues collected	Pages	Publication date	ISBN
	Marvel Mangaverse (2002) #1–6, Marvel Mangaverse: New Dawn (2002) #1, Marvel Mangaverse: Avengers Assemble (2002) #1, Marvel Mangaverse: Fantastic Four (2002) #1, Marvel Mangaverse: Ghost Riders (2002) #1, Marvel Mangaverse: The Punisher (2002) #1, Marvel Mangaverse: Spider-Man (2002) #1, Marvel Mangaverse: X-Men (2002) #1, and Marvel Mangaverse: Eternity Twilight (2002) #1.	392	January 2018	978-1302907655

=== Marvel Zombies ===
#	Issues collected	Pages	Publication date	ISBN
1	Ultimate Fantastic Four #21–23, 30–32; Marvel Zombies #1–5; Marvel Zombies: Dead Days #1; Black Panther (vol. 4) #28–30	464	November 2013	978-0785185383
2	Marvel Zombies 2 #1–5; Marvel Zombies 3 #1–4; Marvel Zombies 4 #1–4; Marvel Zombies Return #1–5	464	May 2014	978-0785188292
3	Marvel Apes: Prime Eight #1; Marvel Zombies: Evil Evolution #1; Marvel Zombies 5 #1–5; Marvel Zombies Supreme #1–5; Marvel Zombies Destroy #1–5; Marvel Zombies Halloween #1	464	November 2014	978-0785188995

=== Miles Morales: Ultimate Spider-Man ===
#	Issues collected	Pages	Publication date	ISBN
1	Ultimate Fallout #4; Ultimate Comics: Spider-Man #1–12; Spider-Men #1–5	400	August 2015	978-0785197782
2	Ultimate Comics: Spider-Man #13–28, 16.1	376	October 2015	978-0785197799
3	Cataclysm: Ultimate Comics: Spider-Man #1–3; Ultimate Spider-Man #200; Miles Morales: The Ultimate Spider-Man #1–12	360	December 2015	978-0785197805

=== Mini Marvels ===
#	Issues collected	Pages	Publication date	ISBN
	Rock, Papers, Scissors; Secret Invasion; Bullpen Bits; Hawkeye and the Curse of the Crimson Crown	216	January 2010	978-0785142843

=== Moon Knight ===
#	Issues collected	Pages	Publication date	ISBN
Moon Knight by Bendis & Maleev
	Moon Knight (2012) #1–12	288	1 Feb 2022	978-1302933623
Moon Knight by Lemire & Smallwood
	Moon Knight (2016) #1-14	320	8 Mar 2022	978-1302933630
Moon Knight: Legacy
	Moon Knight (2017) #188-200	312	5 Apr 2022	978-1302933975

=== Mutant X ===
#	Issues collected	Pages	Publication date	ISBN
1	Mutant X #1–17; Mutant X Annual 1999	480	November 2018	978-1302913250
2	Mutant X #18–32, Mutant X Annual 2000-2001	472	November 5, 2019	978-1302920623

=== Mystique ===
#	Issues collected	Pages	Publication date	ISBN
Mystique by Brian K. Vaughan
	Mystique #1–13	312	June 2011	978-0785155119
Mystique by Sean McKeever
	Mystique #14–24	256	July 2011	978-0785155218

=== New Mutants ===
#	Issues collected	Pages	Publication date	ISBN
New Mutants: Back to School
	New Mutants (2003) #1–13; material from X-Men Unlimited (1993) #42–43	336	January 2018	978-1302910327
New Mutants by Zeb Wells
1	New Mutants (2009) #1–11, 15–21; Marvel Spotlight: New Mutants, material from Necrosha X #1	496	February 2018	978-1302910167
New Mutants by Abnett and Lanning
1	New Mutants (2009) #25–37; Journey into Mystery (2011) #632	328	January 2019	978-1302911447
2	New Mutants (2009) #38–50; Exiled #1; Journey into Mystery (2011) #637–638	360	June 2019	978-1302911430

=== Nextwave: Agents of H.A.T.E. ===
#	Issues collected	Pages	Publication date	ISBN
	Nextwave: Agents of H.A.T.E. #1–12	304	February 2010	978-0785144618

=== Not Brand Echh ===
#	Issues collected	Pages	Publication date	ISBN
	Not Brand Echh (1967) #1–13, Not Brand Echh (2017) #14 and material from Amazing Spider-Man Annual (1964) #1, 5, Daredevil Annual (1967) #1, Fantastic Four Annual #5, Sgt. Fury Annual #4 and Avengers Annual #2	480	July 9, 2019	978-1302918828

=== Nova ===
#	Issues collected	Pages	Publication date	ISBN
Nova by Abnett and Lanning
1	Annihilation: Nova #1–4; Nova (2007) #1–15, Annual (2008) #1 and material from Nova: The Origin of Richard Rider #1	504	July 2018	978-1302911348
2	Nova (2007) #16–36 and material from I Am an Avenger #3	504	December 2018	978-1302915551

=== NYX ===
#	Issues collected	Pages	Publication date	ISBN
	NYX #1–7; NYX: No Way Home #1–6	392	July 2016	978-0785195986

=== Peter Porker, the Spectacular Spider-Ham ===
#	Issues collected	Pages	Publication date	ISBN
1	Marvel Tails #1, Peter Porker, the Spectacular Spider-Ham #1–17	424	July 9, 2019	978-1302918439
2	Marvel Tales (1964) #201–212, 214–219, 223–230, 233, 236–237, 239–240, and 247; What The–?! (1988) #20; Ultimate Civil War: Spider-Ham #1; Spider-Ham 25th Anniversary Special #1; Spider-Man Annual 2019 and material from What The–?! (1988) #3, 18, 22, 24, 26 and Spider-Verse (2015) #1	336	February 23, 2021	978-1302923662

=== Punisher ===
#	Issues collected	Pages	Publication date	ISBN
Punisher MAX
1	Born #1–4; Punisher (2004) #1–12	424	February 2016	978-1302900151
2	Punisher (2004) #13–30	440	April 2016	978-1302900168
3	Punisher (2004) #31–49	448	October 2016	978-1302901875
4	Punisher (2004) #50–60; Punisher Presents: Barracuda #1–5; Punisher: The Tyger; Punisher: The Cell; Punisher: The End	440	April 2016	978-1302900168
5	Punisher (2004) #61–75, Annual #1	504	February 2017	978-1302902742
6	Punisher MAX X-Mas Special, Punisher: Naked Kill, Punisher: Get Castle, Punisher: Butterfly, Punisher: Happy Ending, Punisher: Hot Rods of Death, Punisher: Tiny Ugly World, Untold Tales of Punisher MAX #1–5	376	August 2017	978-1302907396
7	Punisher MAX (2010) #1–22	512	January 2018	978-1302909123
Marvel Knights Punisher by Garth Ennis
1	Punisher (2000) #1–12, Punisher (2001) #1–5, Punisher Kills the Marvel Universe	456	December 2018	978-1302914080
2	Punisher (2001) #6–7, 13–26 and material from Marvel Knights Double-Shot #1	424	March 2019	978-1302916077
3	Punisher (2001) #27–37; Punisher War Zone (2008) #1–6	400	June 2019	978-1302918651
Punisher War Journal
	Punisher War Journal (2006) #1-12, and #1 (black-and-white edition)	344	February 19, 2019	978-1302916428

=== Rogue ===
#	Issues collected	Pages	Publication date	ISBN
	Rogue (vol. 3) #1–12	288	August 2015	978-0785197218

=== Runaways ===
#	Issues collected	Pages	Publication date	ISBN
1	Runaways (vol. 1) #1–18	448	August 2014	978-0785185581
2	Runaways (vol. 2) #1–18; X-Men/Runaways: FCBD	472	December 2014	978-0785187844
3	Runaways (vol. 2) #19–30; Secret Invasion: Runaways/Young Avengers #1–3; Civil War: Young Avengers and Runaways #1–4; Runaways Saga #1	528	March 2015	978-0785189176
4	Runaways (vol. 3) #1–14; Breaking Into Comics the Marvel Way, What If the Runaways Became the Young Avengers?, Mystic Arcana: Sister Grimm	432	July 2015	978-0785189053

=== Scarlet Witch ===
#	Issues collected	Pages	Publication date	ISBN
Scarlet Witch by James Robinson
	Scarlet Witch (2016) #1–15 and material from Doctor Strange: Last Days of Magic (2016) #1	344	February 16, 2021	9781302927387

=== Secret Warriors ===
#	Issues collected	Pages	Publication date	ISBN
1	Secret Warriors #1–16; Dark Reign: The List – Secret Warriors #1 and material from Dark Reign: New Nation #1	480	June 2015	978-0785197638
2	Secret Warriors #17–28; Siege: Secret Warriors #1	352	July 2015	978-0785197645

=== She-Hulk ===
#	Issues collected	Pages	Publication date	ISBN
She-Hulk by Dan Slott
1	She-Hulk (vol. 2) #1–12 and (vol. 3) #1–5	416	February 2014	978-0785154402
2	She-Hulk (vol. 3) #6–21; Marvel Westerns: Two-Gun Kid	384	May 2014	978-0785154709
She-Hulk by Charles Soule
	She-Hulk (2014) #1–12; Wolverines #13 and material from Gwenpool Special #1	312	December 2018	978-1302915469

=== S.H.I.E.L.D. ===
#	Issues collected	Pages	Publication date	ISBN
S.H.I.E.L.D. by Lee and Kirby
	Strange Tales #135–150; Fantastic Four #21; Tales of Suspense #78	256	September 2015	978-0785199014
S.H.I.E.L.D. by Jim Steranko
	Strange Tales #151–168; Nick Fury, Agent of S.H.I.E.L.D. #1–3, 5	352	September 2013	978-0785185369

=== Spider-Girl ===
#	Issues collected	Pages	Publication date	ISBN
1	What If? (1989) #105; Spider-Girl (1998) #½, 1–15, Annual '99	456	August 7, 2018	978-1302912482
2	Spider-Girl (1998) #16–32	432	August 13, 2019	978-1302918446
3	Spider-Girl (1998) #33–50	448	March 30, 2021	978-1302923716
4	Spider-Girl (1998) #51–67	384	April 12, 2022	978-1302934798

=== Spider-Man ===
#	Issues collected	Pages	Publication date	ISBN
Spider-Man: The Next Chapter
1	Amazing Spider-Man (vol. 2) #1–6, Annual '99; Peter Parker: Spider-Man (1999) #1–6, Thor (1998) #8	392	September 7, 2011	978-0785157595
2	Amazing Spider-Man (vol. 2) #7–12; Peter Parker: Spider-Man (1999) #7–12, Annual '99	368	February 22, 2012	978-0785159667
3	Amazing Spider-Man (vol. 2) #13–19, Annual 2000; Peter Parker: Spider-Man (1999) #13–19, Spider-Woman (1999) #9	400	August 22, 2012	978-0785159773
Spider-Man: Revenge of the Green Goblin
	Amazing Spider-Man (vol. 2) #20–29, Annual '01; Peter Parker: Spider-Man (1999) #25,29; Spider-Man: Revenge of the Green Goblin #1–3	440	September 12, 2017	978-1302907006
Amazing Spider-Man by J. Michael Straczynski
1	The Amazing Spider-Man (1999) #30–45	392	July 2009	978-0785138938
2	The Amazing Spider-Man (1999) #46–58; The Amazing Spider-Man #500–502	416	November 2009	978-0785138945
3	The Amazing Spider-Man #503–518	408	May 2010	978-0785138952
4	The Amazing Spider-Man #519–528; Friendly Neighborhood Spider-Man #1–4; Marvel Knights Spider-Man #19–22	480	July 2010	978-0785138969
5	The Amazing Spider-Man #529–545; Friendly Neighborhood Spider-Man #24; The Sensational Spider-Man #41; Spider-Man: One More Day Sketchbook; Marvel Spotlight: Spider-Man – One More Day	536	November 2010	978-0785138976
Amazing Spider-Man: Brand New Day
1	Free Comic Book Day 2007, Amazing Spider-Man #546–564; Spider-Man: Swing Shift - Director's Cut	520	May 2016	978-0785195610
2	Amazing Spider-Man #565–577, Annual (2008) #1; Secret Invasion: The Amazing Spider-Man #1–3	512	August 2016	978-1302900632
3	Amazing Spider-Man #578–591; Spider-Man: Presidents' Day Special #1; Spider-Man: Fear Itself (2009) #1; Amazing Spider-Man: Extra #2–3 and material from Amazing Spider-Man: Extra #1	504	June 2017	978-1302907037
4	Amazing Spider-Man #592–601, Annual #36; Spider-Man: The Short Halloween, Dark Reign: Mr. Negative #1–3; Amazing Spider-Man: American Son Sketchbook and material from Amazing Spider-Man Family #7	504	December 2017	978-1302907990
Amazing Spider-Man: New Ways to Live
	Amazing Spider-Man #602–611; Spider-Man: A Chemical Romance, Spider-Man: The Root of All Annoyance, Amazing Spider-Man Presents: Anti-Venom — New Ways to Live #1–3; Amazing Spider-Man Presents: Jackpot #1–3; material from Web of Spider-Man (2009) #1; Amazing Spider-Man Family #6	480	March 2019	978-1302915629
Spider-Man: The Gauntlet
1	Dark Reign: The List - Amazing Spider-Man #1; Amazing Spider-Man #612–626, Annual #37 and material from Web of Spider-Man (2009) #2–5	520	July 2, 2019	978-1302918453
2	Amazing Spider-Man #627–637, Grim Hunt: The Kraven Saga #1; Amazing Spider-Man Presents: Black Cat #1–4 and material from Web of Spider-Man (2009) #6–7	504	September 22, 2020	978-1302925154
Amazing Spider-Man: Big Time
1	The Amazing Spider-Man #648–662, 654.1	520	June 2012	978-0785162179
2	The Amazing Spider-Man #663–676; Amazing Spider-Man Infested #1; Free Comic Book Day 2011; Spider-Island: Deadly Foes #1; Spider-Island Spotlight	448	December 2013	978-0785185406
3	The Amazing Spider-Man #677–687, 679.1; Daredevil #8; Amazing Spider-Man: Ends of the Earth #1; Avenging Spider-Man #8	352	February 2015	978-0785192152
4	The Amazing Spider-Man #688–697; Avenging Spider-Man #11; Alpha: Big Time #1–5	360	July 2015	978-0785192169
The Superior Spider-Man
1	Amazing Spider-Man #698–700; Superior Spider-Man (vol. 1) #1–16	512	May 2018	978-1302909505
2	Superior Spider-Man (vol. 1) #17–31, Annual #1–2	440	September 2018	978-1302911836
	Superior Spider-Man Companion			
	Avenging Spider-Man #15.1 and #16-22, Daredevil (2011) #22, Superior Spider-Man Team-Up #1-12, Scarlet Spider (2012) #20 and Inhumanity: Superior Spider-Man.	485	December 19, 2018	978-1302507831
Avenging Spider-Man
	Avenging Spider-Man #1–15, Annual #1; Punisher (2011) #10; Daredevil (2011) #11; Amazing Spider-Man Annual #39; Spider-Man vs. Vampires #1 and material from Amazing Spider-Man #692	504	April 23, 2019	978-1302916183
Marvel Knights: Spider-Man by Mark Millar
	Marvel Knights Spider-Man #1–12	288	December 2011	978-0785156406
Spider-Man: Friendly Neighborhood Spider-Man by Peter David
	Friendly Neighborhood Spider-Man #5–23, Annual #1	480	May 2017	978-1302904364
Spider-Man: Light in the Darkness
	Peter Parker: Spider-Man (1999) #20–33, Annual '00; Amazing Spider-Man (1999) #25	432	May 7, 2019	978-1302918637
Spider-Man Loves Mary Jane
	Mary Jane #1–4; Mary Jane: Homecoming #1–4; Spider-Man Loves Mary Jane (2005) #1–8	400	March 12, 2019	978-0785143406
Spider-Man Noir
	Spider-Man Noir #1–4; Spider-Man Noir: Eyes Without A Face #1–4; Edge of Spider-Verse #1; Spider-Geddon: Spider-Man Noir Video Comic and material from Spider-Verse Team-Up #1	264	28 May 2019	978-1302919580
	Spider-Man Noir #1–4; Spider-Man Noir: Eyes Without A Face #1–4; Edge of Spider-Verse #1; Spider-Geddon: Spider-Man Noir Video Comic and material from Spider-Verse Team-Up #1	264	29 Jul 2025	978-1302962876
Spider-Man by Todd McFarlane
	Spider-Man (1990) #1–14, 16; X-Force (1991) #4	440	March 9, 2021	978-1302923730
Untold Tales of Spider-Man
1	Amazing Fantasy (1995) #16–18 and Untold Tales of Spider-Man #1–14	400	November 2021	978-1302931773
Spider-Man: Webspinners
	Webspinners: Tales of Spider-Man #1–18 and material from Shadows & Light #2–3	480	July 2017	978-1302906818

=== Thor ===
#	Issues collected	Pages	Publication date	ISBN
Thor by Kieron Gillen
	Thor #604–614; Siege: Loki, New Mutants #11	312	December 2011	978-0785159223
	Thor #604–614; Siege: Loki, New Mutants #11	312	April 30, 2019	978-1302915612
Thor: The Mighty Avenger
	Thor: The Mighty Avenger #1–8; Free Comic Book Day 2011	216	February 2013	978-0785183815
Thor: The Warriors Three
	Thor Annual #2; Incredible Hulk #102; Marvel Spotlight #30; Marvel Fanfare #34–35; Journey Into Mystery #1; Warriors Three #1–4 and material from Tales to Astonish #101; Marvel Fanfare #13, 36–37; Thor #400, 410, 415–416, Annual #17; Marvel Comics Presents #66; Marvel Super-Heroes #15	384	November 2013	978-0785185284
Thor by Jason Aaron
1	Thor: God of Thunder #1–18	432	May 21, 2019	978-1302918101
2	Thor: God of Thunder #19–25, Thor (2014) #1–8, Annual #1, Thors (2015) #1–4	464	February 11, 2020	978-1302922955
3	Mighty Thor (2015) #1–19	448	April 13, 2021	978-1302923877
4	Unworthy Thor (2017) #1–5, Mighty Thor (2015) #20–23, Generations: Unworthy Thor & Mighty Thor (2017) #1, Mighty Thor (2015) #700–706, Mighty Thor: At the Gates of Valhalla (2018) #1	464	October 26, 2021	978-1302929916
5	Thor (2018) #1–16, King Thor (2019) #1–4	496	April 19, 2022	9781302931636

=== Thunderbolts ===
#	Issues collected	Pages	Publication date	ISBN
Thunderbolts by Warren Ellis and Mike Deodato, Jr.
	Thunderbolts #110–121 and material from: Civil War: The Initiative	296	September 2011	978-0785158493

=== Tigra ===
#	Issues collected	Pages	Publication date	ISBN
	The Claws of the Cat #1–4, Marvel Team-Up (1972) #8, 67, Giant-Size Creatures #1, Marvel Chillers #3–7, Marvel Two-In-One (1974) #19, Marvel Premiere #42, Tigra #1–4 and material from Monsters Unleashed (1973) #10 and Marvel Team-Up (1972) #125	424	December 24, 2019	978-1302920692

=== The Tomb of Dracula ===
#	Issues collected	Pages	Publication date	ISBN
1	Tomb of Dracula #1–15; Dracula Lives! #1–4	512	October 10, 2017	978-1302909314
2	Tomb of Dracula #16–24; Werewolf by Night #15; Giant-Size Spider-Man #1; Giant-Size Chillers featuring The Curse of Dracula #1; Giant-Size Dracula #2; Frankenstein #7–9; Dracula Lives! #5–7	497	October 2018	978-1302913960
3	Tomb of Dracula #25–35, Giant-Size Dracula #3–4, Dracula Lives! #8–12	496	October 8, 2019	978-1302920364
4	Tomb of Dracula #36–54, Doctor Strange #14, Dracula Lives #12–13 and material from Legion of Monsters #1	488	September 15, 2020	978-1302924041
5	Tomb of Dracula #55–70, Stoker's Dracula #3–4, Stoker's Dracula #1 (new cover only), Stoker's Dracula #2 (new story only) and material from Marvel Preview #12 and Savage Sword of Conan #26	488	October 27, 2021	978-1-302-93239-8

=== The Ultimates ===
#	Issues collected	Pages	Publication date	ISBN
The Ultimates
	The Ultimates #1–13	376	June 2010	978-0785143871
The Ultimates 2
	Ultimates 2 #1–13	464	August 2010	978-0785149163

=== Ultimate Iron Man ===
#	Issues collected	Pages	Publication date	ISBN
	Ultimate Iron Man #1–5; Ultimate Iron Man II #1–5	256	February 2010	978-0785146414

=== Ultimate Marvel Team-Up ===
#	Issues collected	Pages	Publication date	ISBN
	Ultimate Marvel Team-Up #1–16; Ultimate Spider-Man Super Special	464	October 2006	978-0785123613

=== Ultimate Spider-Man ===
#	Issues collected	Pages	Publication date	ISBN
1	Ultimate Spider-Man #1–13	352	April 2007	978-0785124924
2	Ultimate Spider-Man #14–27	344	April 2009	978-0785128861
3	Ultimate Spider-Man #½, 28–39	296	August 2010	978-0785149194
4	Ultimate Spider-Man #40–45, 47–53	328	August 2013	978-0785184379
5	Ultimate Spider-Man #46, 54–59; Ultimate Six #1–7	352	February 2015	978-0785192893
6	Ultimate Spider-Man #60–71	296	April 2016	978-0785196327
7	Ultimate Spider-Man #72–85	344	June 2017	978-1302908744

=== Ultimate X-Men ===
#	Issues collected	Pages	Publication date	ISBN
1	Ultimate X-Men #1–12, ½	336	March 2006	978-0785121879
2	Ultimate X-Men #13–25	336	August 2007	978-0785128564
3	Ultimate X-Men #26–33; Ultimate War #1–4	304	August 2009	978-0785141877
4	Ultimate X-Men #34–45	304	October 2010	978-0785149231
5	Ultimate X-Men #46–57	312	March 2015	978-0785192923

=== Venom ===
#	Issues collected	Pages	Publication date	ISBN
Venom by Daniel Way
	Venom (2003) #1–18	424	March 2011	978-0785157045
	Venom (2003) #1–18	424	October 2, 2018	978-1302913809
Venom by Rick Remender
1	Venom (vol. 2) #1–12; Venom/Deadpool: What If? #1	320	June 2015	978-0785193524
2	Venom (vol. 2) #13, 13.1–13.4, 14–22	344	August 2015	978-0785193531
Venom by Cullen Bunn
	Venom #23–42, 27.1; Minimum Carnage: Alpha, Omega; Scarlet Spider #10–11	536	September 2018	978-1302913649

=== Vision ===
#	Issues collected	Pages	Publication date	ISBN
	Vision #1–12	272	November 26, 2019	978-1302920555

=== Warlock ===
#	Issues collected	Pages	Publication date	ISBN
Warlock by Jim Starlin
	Strange Tales #178–181; Warlock #9–15; Avengers Annual #7; Marvel Two-in-One Annual #2	328	February 2014	978-0785188476

=== Werewolf by Night ===
#	Issues collected	Pages	Publication date	ISBN
1	Marvel Spotlight #2–4; Werewolf by Night #1–15; Marvel Team-Up #12; Tomb of Dracula #18	432	October 17, 2017	978-1302908393
2	Werewolf by Night #16–30; Giant-Size Creatures #1; Giant-Size Werewolf #2–4 and material from Monsters Unleashed #6–7	440	February 2018	978-1302909512
3	Werewolf by Night #31–43; Giant-Size Werewolf #5; Marvel Premiere #28; Spider-Woman #6, 19, 32; Marvel Team-Up #93; Ghost Rider #55; Moon Knight #29–30 and material from Marvel Premiere #59	464	May 2018	978-1302911584

=== What If? Classic ===
#	Issues collected	Pages	Publication date	ISBN
1	What If (1977) #1–12	432	29 Jan 2019	978-1302916114
2	What If (1977) #13–15, 17–23	376	12 Nov 2019	978-1302920593
3	What If (1977) #24–35	488	11 Feb 2020	978-1302922740
4	What If (1977) #36-38, 40-42, 44-47	488	30 Jun 2020	978-1302922863

=== Winter Soldier ===
#	Issues collected	Pages	Publication date	ISBN
Winter Soldier by Ed Brubaker
	Winter Soldier #1–14; Fear Itself: Captain America #7.1	344	September 2014	978-0785190653

=== Wolfpack ===
#	Issues collected	Pages	Publication date	ISBN
	Marvel Graphic Novel: Wolfpack, Wolfpack #1–12 and material from Marvel Comics Presents (1988) #11, 23	392	August 21, 2018	978-1302912598

=== Wolverine ===
#	Issues collected	Pages	Publication date	ISBN
Wolverine: Enemy of the State
	Wolverine (vol. 3) #20–32	352	June 2008	978-0785133018
Wolverine by Greg Rucka
	Wolverine (vol. 3) #1–19	448	January 2012	978-0785158455
Wolverine: Origin
	Wolverine: Origin #1–6; Wolverine: Origin II #1–5	328	January 2017	978-1302904715
Wolverine by Jason Aaron
1	Wolverine (vol. 3) #56, 62–65 and material from #73–74; Wolverine: Manifest Destiny #1–4; Wolverine: Weapon X #1–5 and material from Wolverine #175	392	December 2013	978-0785185413
2	Dark Reign – The List: Wolverine #1; Wolverine: Weapon X #6–16; Dark X-Men: The Beginning #3; All-New Wolverine Saga	320	March 2014	978-0785185765
3	Wolverine (vol. 4) #1–9 and 5.1; Astonishing Spider-Man and Wolverine #1–6; Wolverine: Road to Hell #1	456	July 2014	978-0785189084
4	Wolverine (vol. 4) #10–20 and #300–304	408	November 2014	978-0785189091
Wolverine by Daniel Way
1	Wolverine (1988) #187–189; Wolverine (2003) #33–40; Wolverine: Origins #1–5, #1 Director's Cut; Sabretooth #1–4 and material from: I (Heart) Marvel: My Mutant Heart	504	January 2017	978-1302904722
2	Wolverine (2003) #50–55; Wolverine: Origins #6–15, Annual #1; What If: Wolverine #1	480	August 2017	978-1302907389
3	Wolverine: Origins #16–32; X-Men: Original Sin #1; X-Men: Legacy (2008) 217–218 and material from Wolverine (2003) #73–74	496	January 2018	978-1302907686
4	Wolverine: Origins #33–50; Dark Wolverine #85–86	480	May 2018	978-1302909529
Dead Man Logan
	Dead Man Logan #1–12	280	May 11, 2021	978-1302925390

=== X-23 ===
#	Issues collected	Pages	Publication date	ISBN
1	X-23 (2005) #1–6; X-23: Target X #1–6; Captain Universe/X-23 #1; X-23 #1; X-23 (2010) #1–3	456	August 2016	978-1302901165
2	X-23 (2010) #4–21; Daken: Dark Wolverine #8–9 and material from Wolverine: The Road To Hell #1 and All-New Wolverine Saga #1	472	December 2016	978-1302901172

=== X-Factor ===
#	Issues collected	Pages	Publication date	ISBN
X-Factor by Peter David
1	Madrox #1–5; X-Factor #1–12	400	January 2014	978-0785154389
2	X-Factor #13–24 and 28–32; X-Factor: The Quick and the Dead; X-Factor Special: Layla Miller One-Shot	464	May 2014	978-0785154396

=== X-Force ===
#	Issues collected	Pages	Publication date	ISBN
X-Force by Kyle and Yost
1	X-Force (vol. 3) #1–13; X-Force Special: Ain't No Dog #1 and material from X-Force Annual (2010) #1	384	March 2014	978-0785189664
2	X-Force (vol. 3) #17–25; X-Necrosha: The Gathering; X-Force: Sex & Violence #1–3 and material from X-Necrosha and X-Force Annual (2010) #1	384	August 2014	978-0785190004
Uncanny X-Force by Rick Remender
1	Uncanny X-Force #1–19, 5.1 and material from Wolverine: Road to Hell #1; All-New Wolverine Saga and X-Men Spotlight	520	August 2014	978-0785188247
2	Uncanny X-Force #20–35, 19.1	408	December 2014	978-0785128564

=== X-Men ===
#	Issues collected	Pages	Publication date	ISBN
Astonishing X-Men by Joss Whedon and John Cassaday
1	Astonishing X-Men #1–12	320	February 2012	978-0785161943
2	Astonishing X-Men #13–24; Giant-Size Astonishing X-Men #1	344	April 2012	978-0785161950
New X-Men
1	New X-Men #114–126, Annual 2001	376	May 2008	978-0785132516
2	New X-Men #127–141	360	August 2008	978-0785132523
3	New X-Men #142–154	336	November 2008	978-0785132530
New X-Men: Academy X
	New X-Men (2004) #1–15; New X-Men: Academy X Yearbook; New X-Men: Hellions #1–4	496	December 2018	978-1302915681
New X-Men: Childhood's End
	New X-Men (2004) #16–32	440	February 12, 2019	978-1302913847
New X-Men: The Quest For Magik
	New X-Men (2004) #33–39, #40–42 (A Stories) And #43; X-Infernus #1–4 And Saga; And Material From X-Men Unlimited (2004) #14 And X-Men: Divided We Stand #2.	392	June 6, 2019	978-1302918378
Uncanny X-Men by Matt Fraction
1	Uncanny X-Men #500–511, Annual #2 and material from: X-Men Unlimited #9 and X-Men: Divided We Stand #1	384	February 2013	978-0785165934
2	Uncanny X-Men #512–519; Dark Avengers/Uncanny X-Men: Utopia (2009) #1, Dark Avengers/Uncanny X-Men: Exodus (2009) #1; Dark Avengers (2009) #9–10; Dark Reign: The List X-Men (2009) #1 and material from Dark Reign: The Cabal (2009) #1	368	April 2013	978-0785165941
3	Uncanny X-Men #520–522, 526–534; Uncanny X-Men: Heroic Age (one-shot)	336	July 2013	978-0785184508
Uncanny X-Men by Kieron Gillen
1	S.W.O.R.D. #1–5; Uncanny X-Men (1981) #534.1, 535–544; X-Men: Regenesis #1; Uncanny X-Men (2011) #1–3	504	March 5, 2019	978-1302916497
2	Uncanny X-Men (2011) #4–20, AVX: Consequences (2012) #1–5	496	March 3, 2020	978-1302922771
X-Men Classic
1	Classic X-Men #1–23	520	November 2018	978-1302913670
2	Classic X-Men #24–44 and material from Marvel Fanfare (1982) #60	520	November 26, 2019	978-1302920586

=== X-Statix ===
#	Issues collected	Pages	Publication date	ISBN
1	X-Force (1991) #116–129, Brotherhood (2001) #9, X-Statix (2002) #1–5	504	February 4, 2020	978-1302922962
2	X-Statix (2002) #6–20; Wolverine/Doop (2003) #1–2, material from X-Men Unlimited (1993) #41	416	January 4, 2022	978-1302930912

=== Young Avengers ===
#	Issues collected	Pages	Publication date	ISBN
	Young Avengers #1–12; Young Avengers Special	352	July 2010	978-1302905194
Young Avengers By Gillen & Mckelvie
	Young Avengers (2013) #1–15; Marvel Now Point One (2012) #1 (Young Avengers Story)	360	December 2020	978-1302925680

== Complete Epics ==
=== Spider-Man ===
#	Material collected	Publication date	ISBN	Pages
Spider-Man: The Complete Clone Saga Epic
1	The Amazing Spider-Man #394; The Spectacular Spider-Man #217; Spider-Man #51–53; Spider-Man Unlimited #7; Web of Spider-Man #117–119; Spider-Man: The Lost Years #1–3	14 Apr 2010	978-0785144625	432
2	The Amazing Spider-Man #395–399; The Spectacular Spider-Man #218–221; Spider-Man #54–56; Spider-Man Unlimited #8; Web of Spider-Man #120–122; Spider-Man: Funeral for an Octopus #1–3	8 Jun 2010	978-0785143512	488
3	The Amazing Spider-Man #400–401; The Amazing Spider-Man Super Special; The Spectacular Spider-Man #222–224; The Spectacular Spider-Man Super Special; Spider-Man #57–58; Spider-Man Super Special; Spider-Man Unlimited #9; Web of Spider-Man #123–124; Web of Spider-Man Super Special; Spider-Man: The Clone Journal; Venom Super Special	15 Sep 2010	978-0785149545	464
4	The Amazing Spider-Man #402–404; The Spectacular Spider-Man #225–227; Spider-Man #59–61; Web of Spider-Man #125–127; New Warriors #61; Spider-Man: The Jackal Files; Spider-Man: Maximum Clonage Alpha and Omega	8 Dec 2010	978-0785149552	480
5	New Warriors #62–64; The Amazing Spider-Man #405–406; The Spectacular Spider-Man #228–229; Spider-Man #62–63; Spider-Man Team-Up #1; Spider-Man Unlimited #10; Venom Super Special Flipbook; Web of Spider-Man #128–129	1 Jan 2011	978-0785150091	472
Spider-Man: The Complete Ben Reilly Epic
1	Spider-Man: The Parker Years; New Warriors #65–66; Scarlet Spider Unlimited #1; Web of Scarlet Spider #1–2; The Amazing Scarlet Spider #1–2; Scarlet Spider #1–2; The Spectacular Scarlet Spider #1–2; Green Goblin #3; The Sensational Spider-Man #0; Sensational Spider-Man Mini-Comic	10 Aug 2011	978-0785155454	424
2	Amazing Spider-Man #407–408; New Warriors #67; Sensational Spider-Man #1; Spectacular Spider-Man #230; Spider-Man #64–65; Spider-Man/Punisher: Family Plot #1–2; Web of Scarlet Spider #3–4; and material from: Spider-Man Holiday Special; Venom: Along Came a Spider 1–4	9 Nov 2011	978-0785156123	424
3	Amazing Spider-Man #409–410; Sensational Spider-Man #2–3; Spectacular Spider-Man #231–233; Spider-Man #66–67; Spider-Man: The Final Adventure #1–4; Spider-Man Team-Up #2; Spider-Man Unlimited #11	25 Jan 2012	978-0785156130	432
4	Amazing Spider-Man #411–413; Sensational Spider-Man #4–6; Spectacular Spider-Man #234; Spider-Man #68–70; Spider-Man Team Up #3; Spider-Man Unlimited #12; Spider-Man: Redemption #1–4	Apr 2012	978-0785161318	464
5	Amazing Spider-Man #414–416 and material from: Annual '96; Sensational Spider-Man #7–10; Spectacular Spider-Man #235–239; Spider-Man #71–72; Spider-Man Team Up #4; Spider-Man Unlimited #13	28 Jul 2012	978-0785163831	464
6	Amazing Spider-Man #417–418; Sensational Spider-Man #11; Spectacular Spider-Man #240- 241; Spider-Man #73–75; Spider-Man Team-Up #5; Spider-Man Unlimited #14; Spider-Man: Revelations extra pages; Spider-Man: The Osborn Journal #1; 101 Ways to End the Clone Saga #1; Spider-Man: Dead Man's Hand #1	18 Nov 2012	978-0785165521	448

=== X-Men ===
#	Material collected	Publication date	ISBN	Pages
X-Men: The Complete Age of Apocalypse Epic
1	X-Men Chronicles #1–2; Tales from the Age of Apocalypse: By the Light; X-Man #1, '96 Annual; Tales from the Age of Apocalypse: Sinister Bloodlines; Blink #1–4	March 2005	978-0785117148	360
2	X-Men: Alpha; Age of Apocalypse: The Chosen; Generation Next #1; Astonishing X-Men #1; X-Calibre #1; Gambit and the X-Ternals #1–2; Weapon X #1–2; Amazing X-Men #1–2; Factor X #1–2; X-Man #1	August 2006	978-0785118749	376
3	X-Calibre #2–3; Astonishing X-Men #2–4; Generation Next #2–3; X-Man #2–3; Factor X #3; Amazing X-Men #3; Weapon X #3; Gambit and the X-Ternals #3; X-Universe #1	April 2006	978-0785120513	352
4	Generation Next #4; X-Calibre #4; X-Man #4, 53–54; Factor X #4; Gambit and the X-Ternals #4; Amazing X-Men #4; Weapon X #4; X-Universe #2; X-Men: Omega; Blink #4; X-Men: Prime	November 2006	978-0785120520	376
X-Men: The Complete Onslaught Epic
1	X-Men #53–54; Uncanny X-Men #334–335; Fantastic Four #414–415; Avengers #400–401; Onslaught: X-Men; Cable #34; Incredible Hulk #444	December 2007	978-0785128236	272
2	Excalibur #100; Wolverine #104; X-Factor #125–126; The Sensational Spider-Man #8; The Amazing Spider-Man #415; Green Goblin #12; Spider-Man #72; X-Man #18; X-Force #57; Punisher #11	June 2008	978-0785128243	248
3	X-Men (vol. 2) #55; Uncanny X-Men #336; Cable #35; X-Force #58; X-Man #19; Incredible Hulk #445; Iron Man #332; Avengers #402; Thor #502; Wolverine #105	August 2008	978-0785128250	248
4	Fantastic Four #416; X-Men (vol. 2) #56–57; Onslaught: Marvel Universe; Cable #36; Uncanny X-Men #337; Onslaught: Epilogue; Iron Man #6; X-Men: Road to Onslaught	January 2009	978-0785128267	256

== See also ==
- Marvel Epic Collection
- Marvel Premier Collection
- Marvel Omnibus
- Marvel oversized hardcovers
- Spider-Man collected editions
- Daredevil collected editions
- Marvel Masterworks
- Essential Marvel
- DC Omnibus
- DC Finest trade paperbacks
- DC Compact Comics
