= Get =

Get or GET may refer to:

== Businesses and brands ==
- Great Entertainment Television, an American television network
- Get AS, a Norwegian cable and Internet provider
- GET-ligaen, a Norwegian ice hockey league (now Eliteserien)
- Get 27, a French mint liqueur

== Education ==
- Groupe des Écoles des Télécommunications, a French collegiate university
- Guaranteed Education Tuition Program, Washington, United States

== Other uses ==
- Gender exploratory therapy; see Conversion therapy#Gender exploratory therapy
- Get (animal), in livestock breeding
- Get (divorce document), in Jewish religious law
- GET (HTTP), in Internet protocols
- "Get" (song), 2010, by the Groggers
- Georgia Time
- Gets (people), an ancient Thracian tribe
- Graded exercise therapy, for chronic fatigue syndrome
- Geraldton Airport, Western Australia
- GET (posting), a tradition of venerating special post numbers like 99999, 100000, or 123456 on imageboards

== See also ==
- Geats, a tribe who inhabited modern southern Sweden from antiquity until the late Middle Ages
- Git (disambiguation)
- Got (disambiguation)
