= Getter (disambiguation) =

A getter is a substance introduced into a vacuum tube to remove traces of gas.

Getter may also refer to:

- a read-only accessor method in object-oriented programming, also known as a getter
- Getter Robo, fictional robot
- Getter (name), Estonian feminine given name
- Matylda Getter, Polish nun
- Getter (DJ), American DJ
- Gettr, a social media site

== See also ==
- Get (disambiguation)
