= DC Chronicles =

Line of trade paperbacks

The DC Chronicles is a line of trade paperbacks, chronologically reprinting the earliest stories (based on publication dates) starring some of the best-known DC Comics superheroes.

Stories are reprinted in color with no ads, providing readers access to original Golden and Silver Age comic book stories which had previously been reprinted in the DC Archive Editions format. The volumes were priced significantly lower than the Archives series in order to be more affordable for the reader, with each one typically priced at $14.99 USD.

The final volumes were released in 2013. Since then, DC has been re-publishing these stories in the same chronological format in the bigger DC Omnibus series. Each Age era Omnibus volume is also published as two or three (depending on page count) trade paperbacks.

== Publications ==
=== The Batman Chronicles ===
Cover of The Batman Chronicles 1 (March 2005). Art by Bob Kane.

- The Batman Chronicles Volume 1 collects Detective Comics #27–38 and Batman #1, April 2005, ISBN 978-1-4012-0445-7
- The Batman Chronicles Volume 2 collects Detective Comics #39–45, Batman #2–3, and The New York World's Fair Comics #2, September 2006, ISBN 978-1-4012-0790-8
- The Batman Chronicles Volume 3 collects Detective Comics #46–50, Batman #4–5, and World's Best Comics #1, May 2007, ISBN 978-1-4012-1347-3
- The Batman Chronicles Volume 4 collects Detective Comics #51–56, Batman #6–7, and World's Finest Comics #2–3, October 2007, ISBN 978-1-4012-1462-3
- The Batman Chronicles Volume 5 collects Detective Comics #57–61, Batman #8–9, and World's Finest Comics #4, April 2008, ISBN 978-1-4012-1682-5
- The Batman Chronicles Volume 6 collects Detective Comics #62–65, Batman #10–11, and World's Finest Comics #5–6, October 2008, ISBN 978-1-4012-1961-1
- The Batman Chronicles Volume 7 collects Detective Comics #66–70, Batman #12–13, and World's Finest Comics #7, March 2009, ISBN 978-1-4012-2134-8
- The Batman Chronicles Volume 8 collects Detective Comics #71–74, Batman #14–15, and World's Finest Comics #8–9, October 2009, ISBN 978-1-4012-2484-4
- The Batman Chronicles Volume 9 collects Detective Comics #75–77, Batman #16–17, and World's Finest Comics #10, March 2010, ISBN 978-1-4012-2645-9
- The Batman Chronicles Volume 10 collects Detective Comics #78–81, Batman #18–19, and World's Finest Comics #11, December 2010, ISBN 978-1-4012-2895-8
- The Batman Chronicles Volume 11 collects Detective Comics #82–85, Batman #20–21, and World's Finest Comics #12, January 2013, ISBN 978-1-4012-3739-4

=== The Superman Chronicles ===
Cover of The Superman Chronicles 1 (February 2006). Art by Joe Shuster.

This series is technically incomplete due to Volume 8 missing the story from World's Finest Comics #5.

- The Superman Chronicles Volume 1 collects material from Action Comics #1–13, The New York World's Fair Comics #1, and Superman #1; February 2006; ISBN 978-1-4012-0764-9
- The Superman Chronicles Volume 2 collects material from Action Comics #14–20, and Superman #2–3; February 2007; ISBN 978-1-4012-1215-5
- The Superman Chronicles Volume 3 collects material from Action Comics #21–25, Superman #4–5, and The New York World's Fair Comics #2; August 2007; ISBN 978-1-4012-1374-9
- The Superman Chronicles Volume 4 collects material from Action Comics #26–31, and Superman #6–7; February 2008; ISBN 978-1-4012-1658-0
- The Superman Chronicles Volume 5 collects material from Action Comics #32–36, Superman #8–9, and World's Best Comics #1; August 2008; ISBN 978-1-4012-1851-5
- The Superman Chronicles Volume 6 collects material from Action Comics #37–40, Superman #10–11, and World's Finest Comics #2–3; February 2009; ISBN 978-1-4012-2187-4
- The Superman Chronicles Volume 7 collects material from Action Comics #41–43, Superman #12–13, and World's Finest Comics #4; July 2009; ISBN 978-1-4012-2288-8
- The Superman Chronicles Volume 8 collects material from Action Comics #44–47, and Superman #14–15; April 2010; ISBN 978-1-4012-2647-3
- The Superman Chronicles Volume 9 collects material from Action Comics #48–52, Superman #16–17, and World's Finest Comics #6; June 2011; ISBN 978-1-4012-3122-4
- The Superman Chronicles Volume 10 collects material from Action Comics #53–55, Superman #18–19, and World's Finest Comics #7; September 2012; ISBN 978-1-4012-3488-1

=== The Green Lantern Chronicles ===
Cover of The Green Lantern Chronicles 1 (May 2009). Art by Gil Kane.

Collecting the stories starring the Silver Age Green Lantern (Hal Jordan).

- The Green Lantern Chronicles Volume 1 collects material from Showcase #22–24, and Green Lantern (vol. 2) #1–3; May 2009; ISBN 978-1-4012-2163-8
- The Green Lantern Chronicles Volume 2 collects Green Lantern (vol. 2) #4–9; December 2009; ISBN 978-1-4012-2499-8
- The Green Lantern Chronicles Volume 3 collects Green Lantern (vol. 2) #10–14, and The Flash #131; October 2010; ISBN 978-1-4012-2915-3
- The Green Lantern Chronicles Volume 4 collects Green Lantern (vol. 2) #15–20; March 2012; ISBN 978-1-4012-3396-9

=== The Flash Chronicles ===
Cover of The Flash Chronicles 1 (September 2009). Art by Carmine Infantino.

Collecting the stories starring the Silver Age Flash (Barry Allen).

- The Flash Chronicles Volume 1 collects material from Showcase #4, 8, 13–14; and The Flash #105–106; September 2009; original: October 1956-May 1959;ISBN 978-1-4012-2471-4
- The Flash Chronicles Volume 2 collects material from The Flash #107–112; September 2010; original: July 1959-May 1960;ISBN 978-1-4012-2884-2
- The Flash Chronicles Volume 3 collects material from The Flash #113–118; August 2012; original: July 1960-February 1961; ISBN 978-1-4012-3490-4
- The Flash Chronicles Volume 4 collects material from The Flash #119–124; April 2013; original: March 1961-November 1961; ISBN 978-1-4012-3831-5

=== The Wonder Woman Chronicles ===
Cover of The Wonder Woman Chronicles 1 (March 2010). Art by H. G. Peter.

- The Wonder Woman Chronicles Volume 1 collects material from All Star Comics #8, Sensation Comics #1–9, and Wonder Woman #1; March 23, 2010; ISBN 978-1-4012-2644-2
- The Wonder Woman Chronicles Volume 2 collects material from Wonder Woman #2–3, Sensation Comics #10–14, and Comic Cavalcade #1; December 6, 2011; ISBN 978-1-4012-3240-5
- The Wonder Woman Chronicles Volume 3 collects material from Wonder Woman #4–5, Sensation Comics #15–18, and Comic Cavalcade #2; December 4, 2012; ISBN 978-1-4012-3692-2

== See also ==
- List of comic books on CD/DVD
