= Git (disambiguation) =

Git is a distributed version control system.

Git, Gits or GIT may also refer to:

== Language ==
- Git (pronoun), a pronoun in Old English
- Git (slang), British and Irish slang for a contemptible person
- Gitxsan language

== Entertainment ==
- Git!, a 1965 American drama film
- Git Gay (1921–2007), Swedish actress and singer
- Feathers in the Wind, a 2005 South Korean film
- Ghost in the Shell, a Japanese media franchise

=== Music ===
- Git (album), by Skeletons & The Girl-Faced Boys
- G.I.T.: Get It Together, a 1973 album by The Jackson 5
- The Gits, a post punk band
- "Git" (song), by Candan Erçetin
- G.I.T., an Argentine rock band
- GIT Award, a Liverpool music award

== Mathematics, science and technology ==
- Gastrointestinal tract
- Geographic information technology
- Geometric invariant theory
- Geoscientist In Training, a professional designation

== Places ==
- Git, Iran, a village
- Gits, Belgium, a village in West Flanders

== Other uses ==
- Gebze Institute of Technology, in Turkey
- Georgia Institute of Technology, a public research university in Atlanta, Georgia, United States
- Graphic Imaging Technology, an American digital archiving company
- GROWTH-India Telescope, India's first fully robotic research telescope
- Guitar Institute of Technology, former name of the Musicians Institute

== See also ==
- G.I.T. on Broadway, a 1969 television special
