= Graphic Imaging Technology =

Graphic Imaging Technology Inc., or GIT, is a digital archiving company located in Brooklyn, NY. The company is best known for its releases of scanned comic book collections on CDs and DVDs. For a time, GIT held the license to release collections of scanned Marvel comic books, which included some of their classic characters such as Spider-Man, Captain America, The Hulk, Iron Man, and the Fantastic Four. They held the license with Marvel until 2007, when Marvel chose to instead release digital comics through their Marvel Digital Comics Unlimited website. As a result, the company was no longer allowed to produce collections of Marvel books, and could not sell their back stock of previous releases. In addition to Marvel comics, GIT has also released collections for Archie Comics, Mad magazine, and National Lampoon.

GIT has currently launched pre-sales of complete digital magazine collection of popular American motorcycle magazine Easyriders, covering 554 issues over past 50 years (June 1971 to September 2019). Unlike their past products, this archive is offered on a USB drive with DRM protection with license to use on 3 devices, supporting Windows, Apple and Android systems. The new website also lists all 57 swimsuit issues of Sports Illustrated magazine since 1964 for sale on DVD format.

== See also ==
- Bondi Digital Publishing
- List of comic books on CD/DVD
