= Revel, Haute-Garonne =

Revel
- Commune
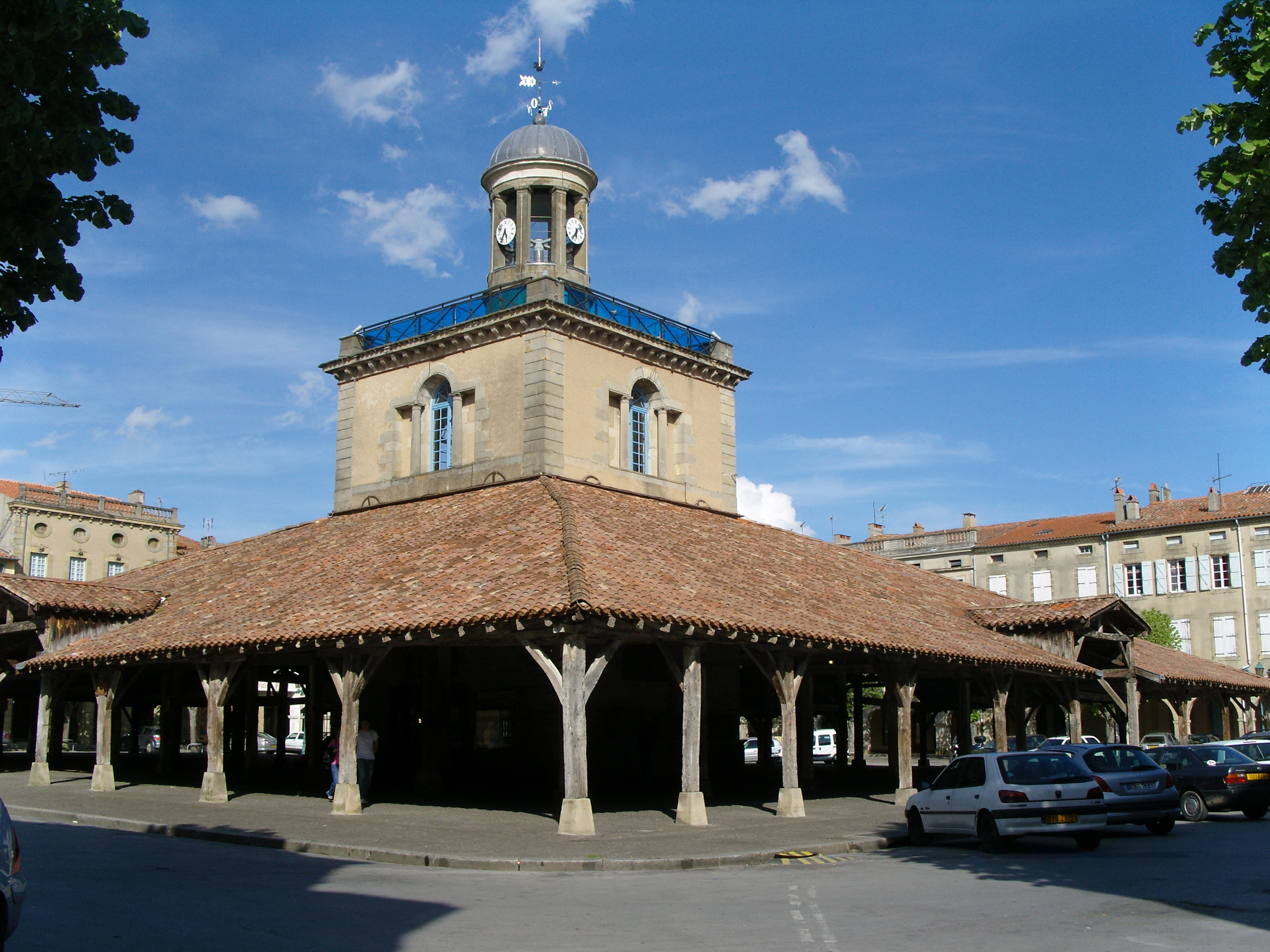
- The belfry in Revel

- Coat of arms
- Location of Revel
- Location within France Location within Occitanie
- Coordinates: 43°27′34″N 2°00′17″E
- Country: France
- Region: Occitania
- Department: Haute-Garonne
- Arrondissement: Toulouse
- Canton: Revel
- Intercommunality: CC aux sources du Canal du Midi

Government
  - Mayor (2020–2026): Laurent Hourquet
- Area^{1}: 35.31 km^{2} (13.63 sq mi)
- Elevation: 210 m (690 ft)
- Highest elevation: 381 m (1,250 ft)
- Lowest elevation: 179 m (587 ft)
- Population (2023): 9,762
  - Density: 276.5/km^{2} (716.0/sq mi)
- Time zone: UTC+01:00 (CET)
  - Summer (DST): UTC+02:00 (CEST)
- INSEE/Postal code: 31451 /31250
- ^{1} French Land Register data, which excludes lakes, ponds, glaciers > 1 km^{2} (0.386 sq mi or 247 acres) and river estuaries.

Revel (French pronunciation: [ʁəvɛl]; Occitan: Revèl) is a commune in the Haute-Garonne department in southwestern France.

== Geography ==
=== Location ===
Revel is situated 52 km (32 mi) east of Toulouse. Other notable nearby towns are Carcassonne and Castelnaudary to the south, Castres to the east, and Albi to the northeast.

=== Climate ===
Revel has a humid subtropical climate (Köppen climate classification Cfa). The average annual temperature in Revel is 13.5 °C (56.3 °F). The average annual rainfall is 892.6 mm (35.14 in) with April as the wettest month. The temperatures are highest on average in August, at around 22.0 °C (71.6 °F), and lowest in January, at around 5.8 °C (42.4 °F). The highest temperature ever recorded in Revel was 40.2 °C (104.4 °F) on 17 June 2022; the coldest temperature ever recorded was −16.5 °C (2.3 °F) on 16 January 1985.

Climate data for Revel, elevation 338 m (1,109 ft), (1991−2020 normals, extremes 1928−present)
Month	Jan	Feb	Mar	Apr	May	Jun	Jul	Aug	Sep	Oct	Nov	Dec	Year
Record high °C (°F)	20.0 (68.0)	24.0 (75.2)	29.0 (84.2)	30.0 (86.0)	33.2 (91.8)	40.2 (104.4)	39.6 (103.3)	40.0 (104.0)	35.0 (95.0)	30.0 (86.0)	25.0 (77.0)	21.0 (69.8)	40.2 (104.4)
Mean daily maximum °C (°F)	9.2 (48.6)	10.6 (51.1)	14.3 (57.7)	16.9 (62.4)	20.8 (69.4)	24.9 (76.8)	28.1 (82.6)	28.2 (82.8)	24.0 (75.2)	19.1 (66.4)	13.1 (55.6)	10.2 (50.4)	18.3 (64.9)
Daily mean °C (°F)	5.8 (42.4)	6.5 (43.7)	9.5 (49.1)	11.9 (53.4)	15.6 (60.1)	19.2 (66.6)	21.8 (71.2)	22.0 (71.6)	18.3 (64.9)	14.7 (58.5)	9.4 (48.9)	6.8 (44.2)	13.5 (56.3)
Mean daily minimum °C (°F)	2.5 (36.5)	2.4 (36.3)	4.7 (40.5)	6.8 (44.2)	10.4 (50.7)	13.5 (56.3)	15.6 (60.1)	15.9 (60.6)	12.8 (55.0)	10.3 (50.5)	5.7 (42.3)	3.4 (38.1)	8.7 (47.7)
Record low °C (°F)	−16.5 (2.3)	−15.0 (5.0)	−9.5 (14.9)	−4.0 (24.8)	0.0 (32.0)	0.7 (33.3)	7.5 (45.5)	6.0 (42.8)	2.0 (35.6)	−2.5 (27.5)	−7.5 (18.5)	−12.0 (10.4)	−16.5 (2.3)
Average precipitation mm (inches)	77.5 (3.05)	55.7 (2.19)	67.0 (2.64)	95.1 (3.74)	94.4 (3.72)	79.7 (3.14)	58.5 (2.30)	53.8 (2.12)	74.7 (2.94)	79.3 (3.12)	87.0 (3.43)	69.9 (2.75)	892.6 (35.14)
Average precipitation days (≥ 1.0 mm)	11.4	9.5	9.3	10.8	9.4	8.0	6.4	6.0	7.1	8.6	11.2	10.9	108.5
Source: Météo-France

== Population ==
Historical population
Year	Pop.	±% p.a.
1968	6,843	—
1975	7,164	+0.66%
1982	7,448	+0.56%
1990	7,520	+0.12%
1999	7,985	+0.67%
2007	8,990	+1.49%
2012	9,341	+0.77%
2017	9,582	+0.51%
2023	9,762	+0.31%
Source: INSEE

The inhabitants of the commune are known as Revélois and Revéloises in French.

== History ==
Revel was one of the last bastide towns to be chartered. Founded as a royal bastide by the king's seneschal from Toulouse, Agot de Baux, on 8 June 1342, it was originally an open town on a featureless plain. During the Hundred Years' War, the townspeople successfully lobbied for the right to protect themselves and built a kilometre of ramparts six metres high and four gates at the points of the compass.

== Sights ==
The most notable physical feature of Revel is its central square, partially covered by a 14th-century roof, supported by wooden pillars and topped by a distinctive bell-tower. Originally, the marketplace was erected in the fourteenth century. In 1829, a fire destroyed the building. Five years later, it was restored, accruing its recent form with the addition of the cupola and a clock. Every Saturday morning, a market is held in the square and surrounding streets in which a variety of goods, but especially food and clothing, are for sale.

Another distinctive building is the large, Gothic-style town church of Notre-Dame, just south of the central square.

Just south of Revel, where the land begins to slope upwards into the Montagne Noire regional park, is the Lac de Saint-Ferréol, a man-made lake dating from the seventeenth century which is linked to and supplies water to the Canal du Midi. For some time, the lake has been enjoyed by local residents and tourists as a place for walking, sunbathing, picnicking etc. A number of hotels, cafés, restaurants and private homes can be found close to the north shore of the lake.

== Economy ==
Revel is arguably best known for two products: furniture, and a mint liqueur named Get 27, which has been manufactured in the town since the 18th century. Cabinet-making is a specialty of the area, and many cabinet makers are trained at the local lycée, which specialises in technical training, and admits pupils from across the region on a residential (boarding) basis during the week. Furniture shops and warehouses are a feature of Revel and the surrounding area.

Revel's lycée is located on the east side of the town, on the Route de Sorèze, and is named after Vincent Auriol (1884–1966), the socialist politician who was born in the town and who was the first President of the Fourth Republic of France between 1947 and 1954.

== Transportation ==
Public transport to and from Revel is sparse. At one time, Revel was linked to Toulouse by rail, but the only remnant of this facility is the derelict railway station to the north-west of the town. The nearest town with a rail link (to Toulouse or the south coast) is Castelnaudary. A coach service between Revel and Toulouse runs on an infrequent basis.

== Media ==
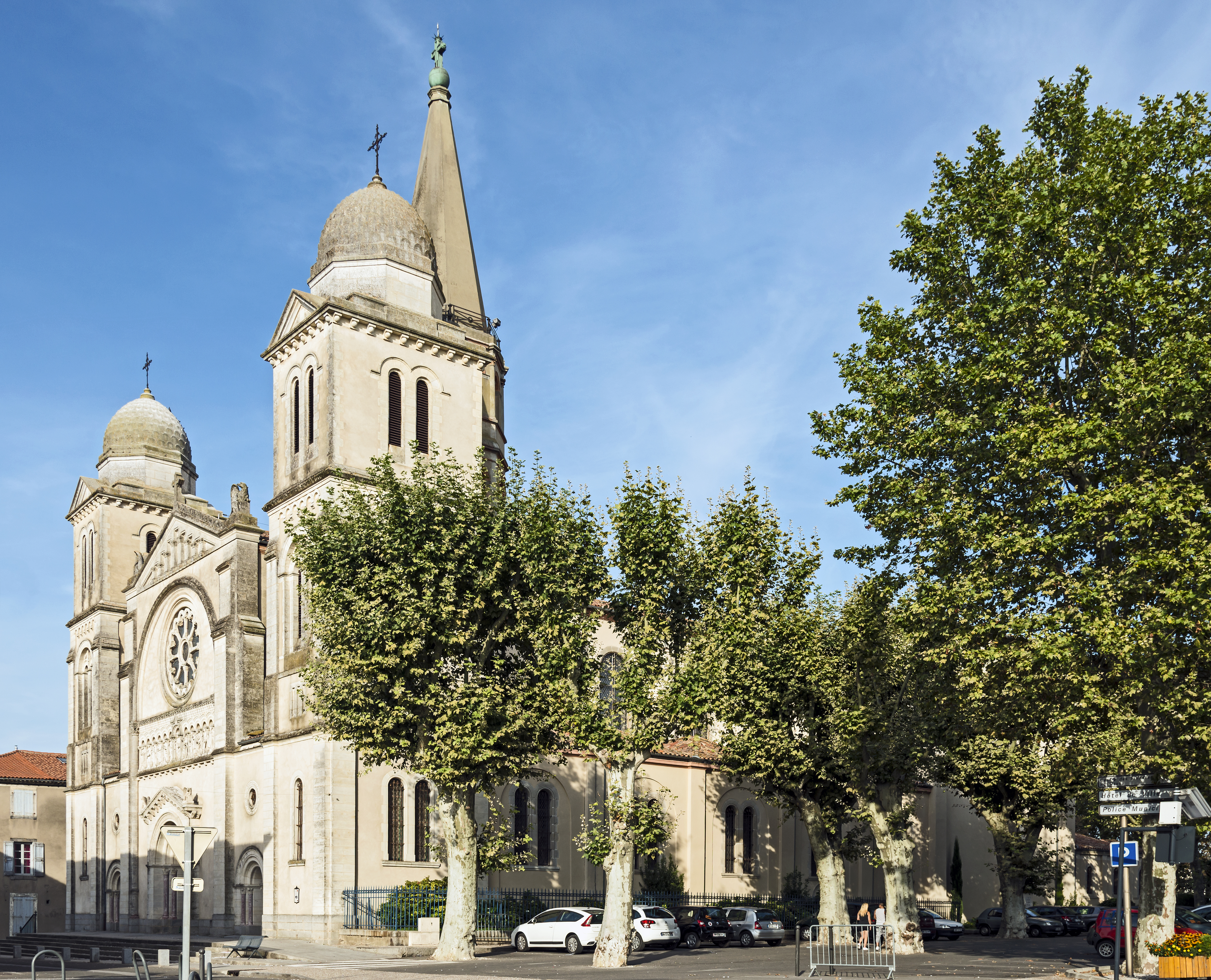
Church "Notre-Dame de Revel"

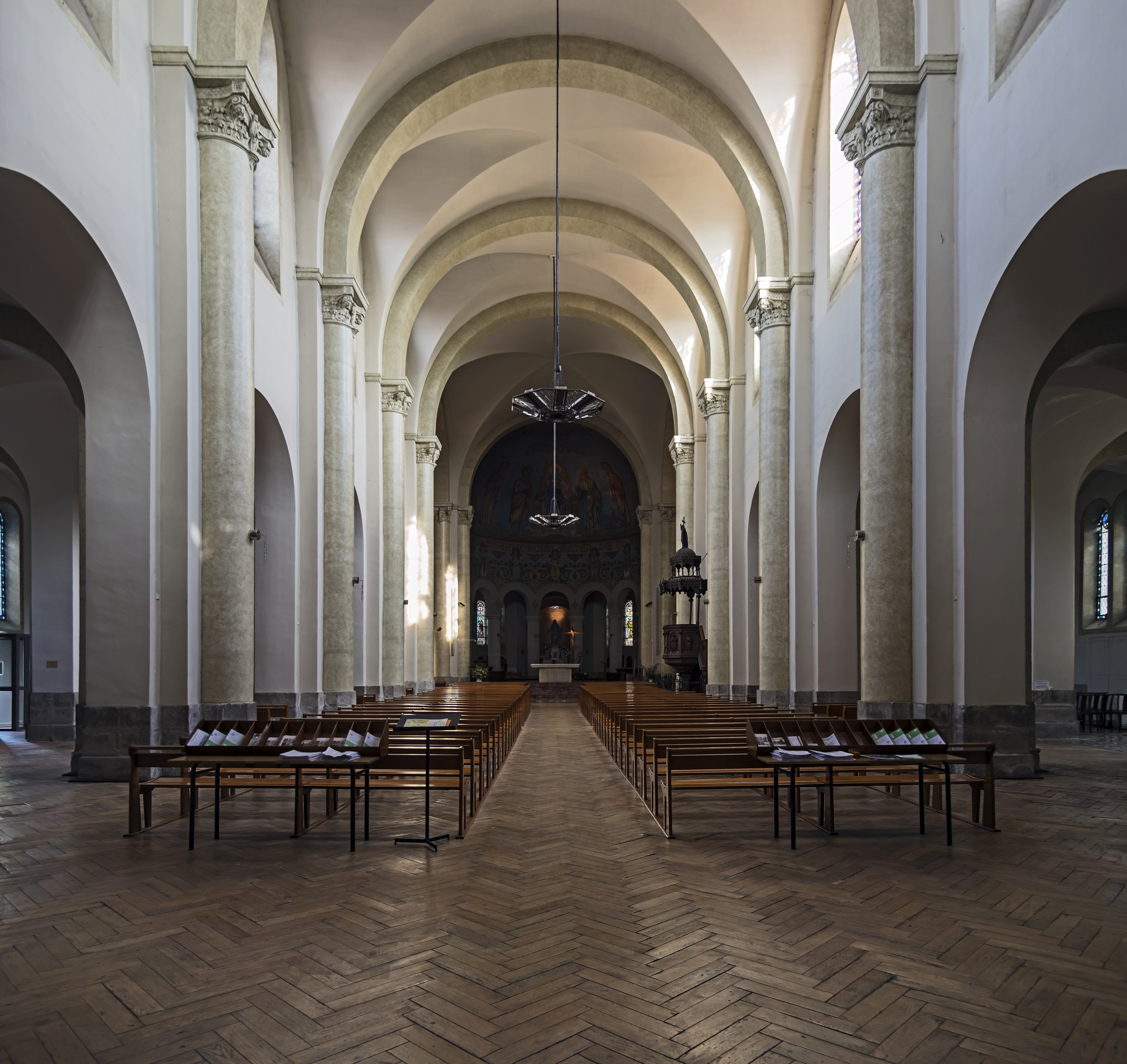
Interior

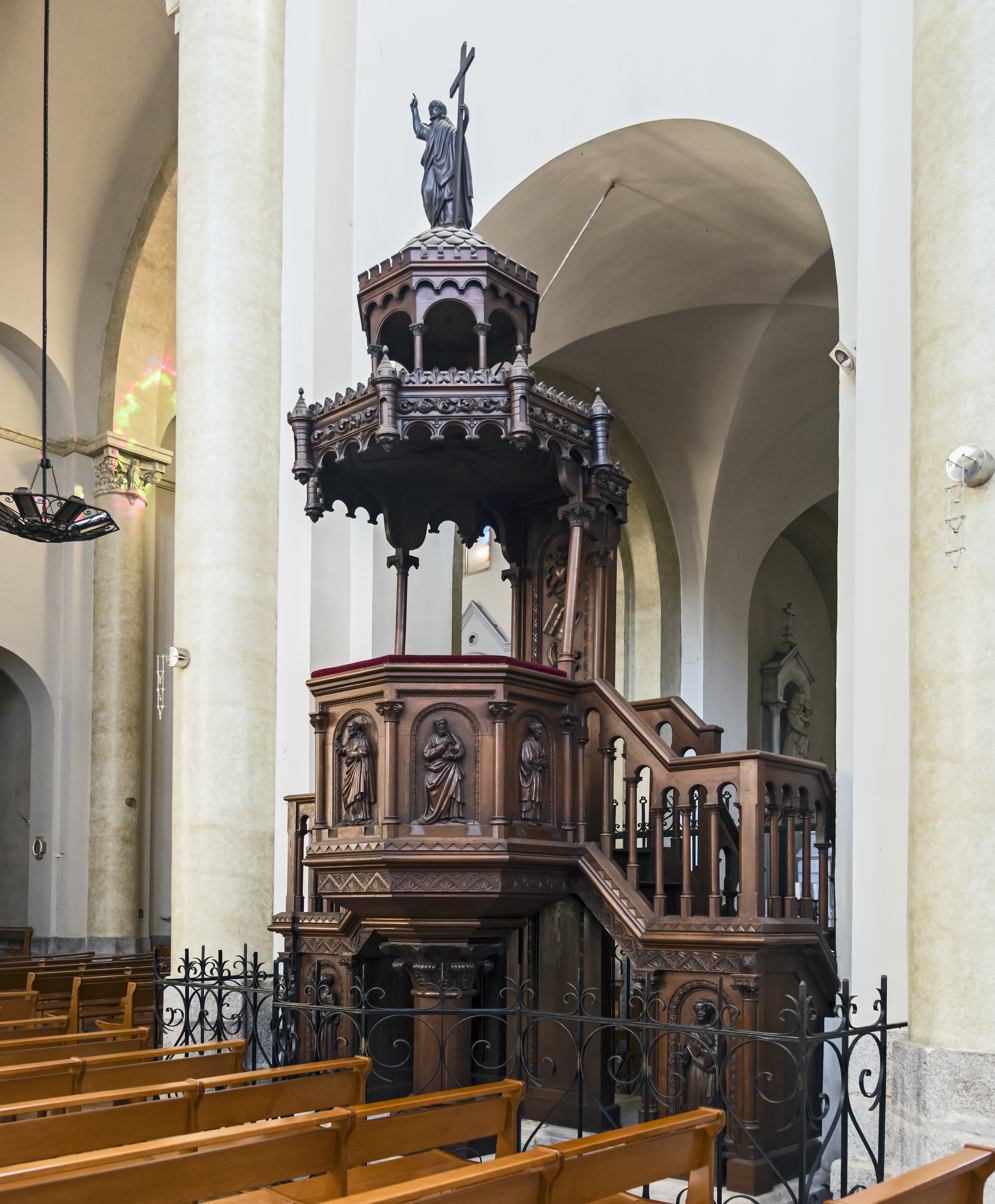
Pulpit

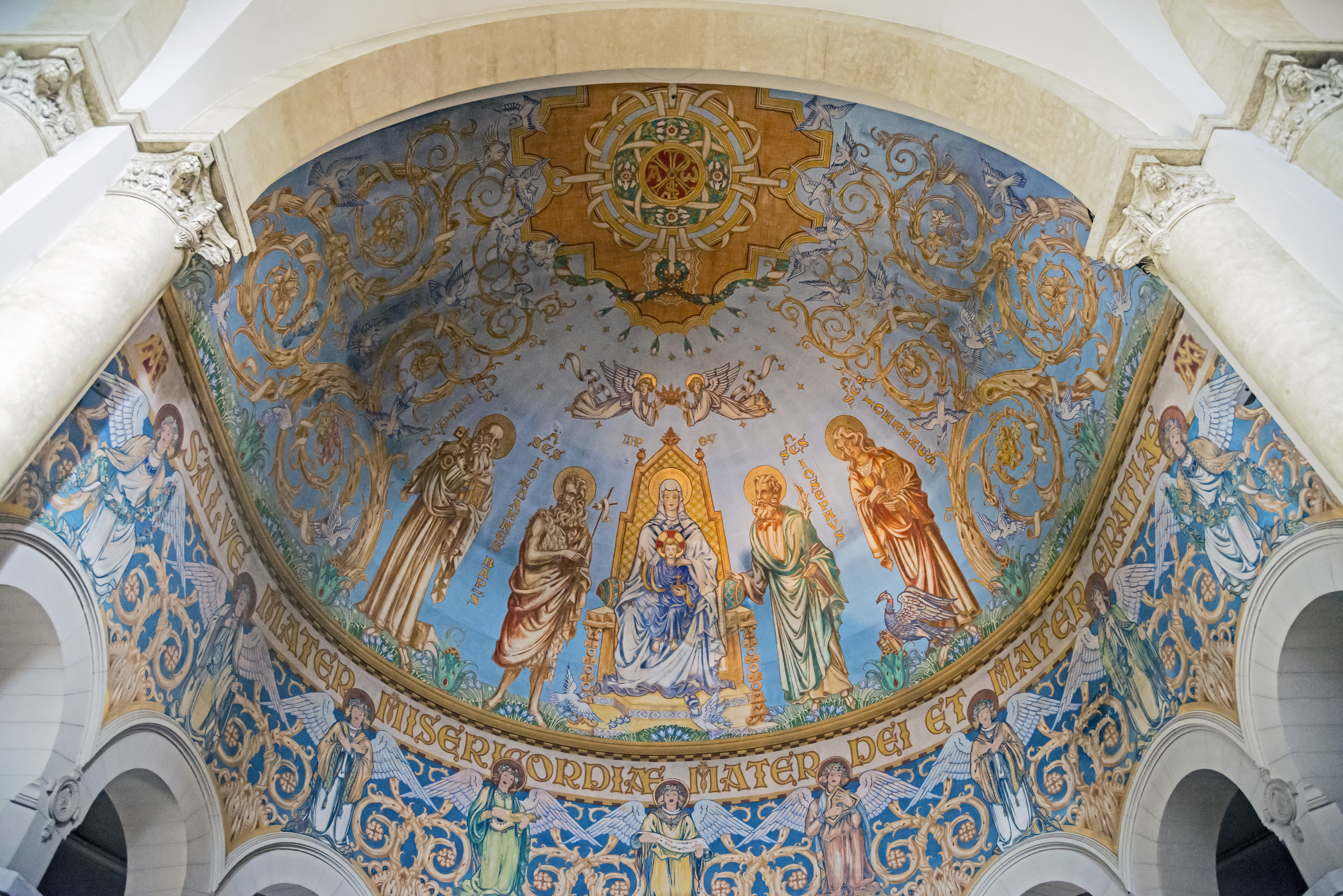
Vault of choir

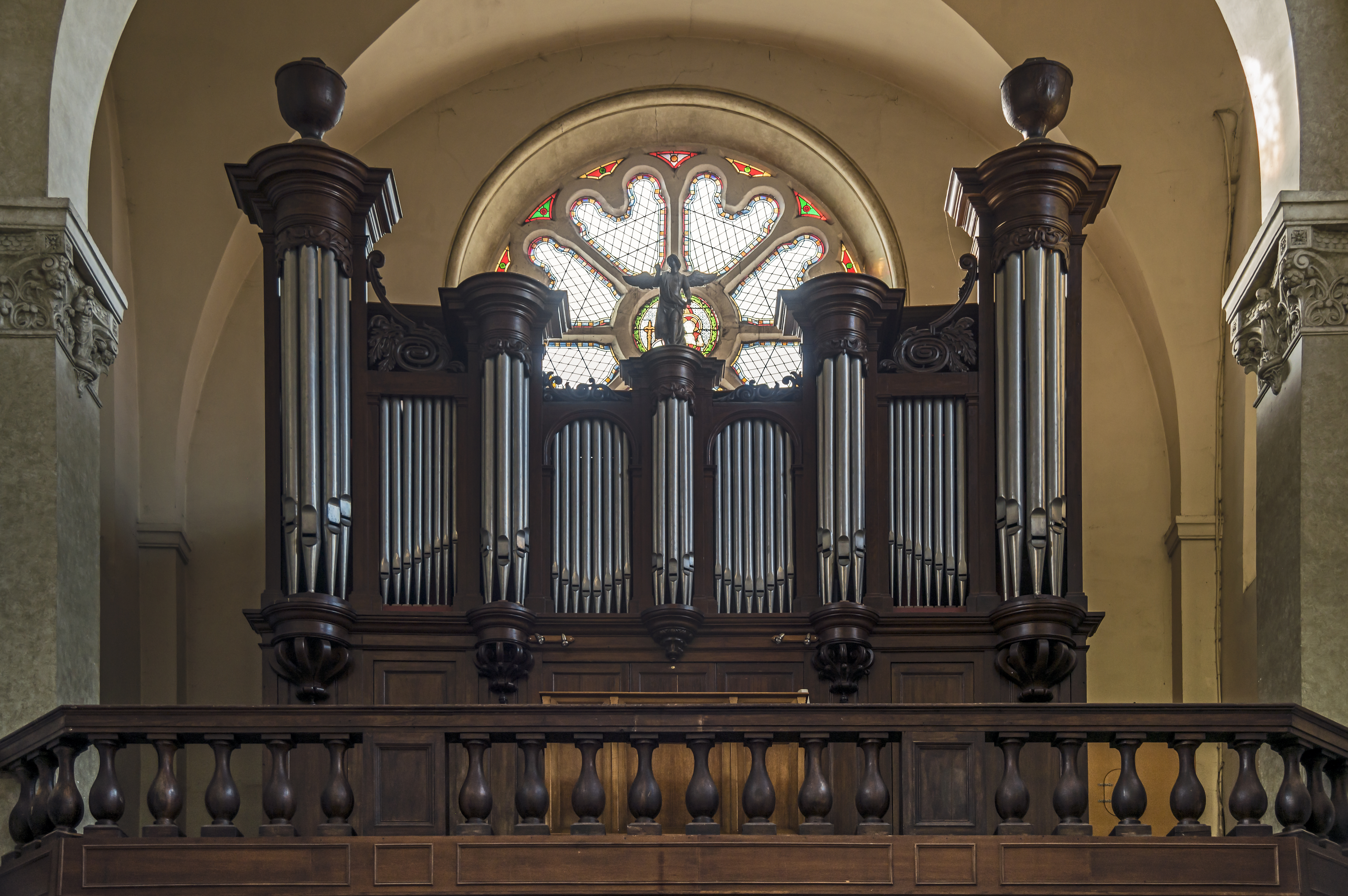
Gallery organ

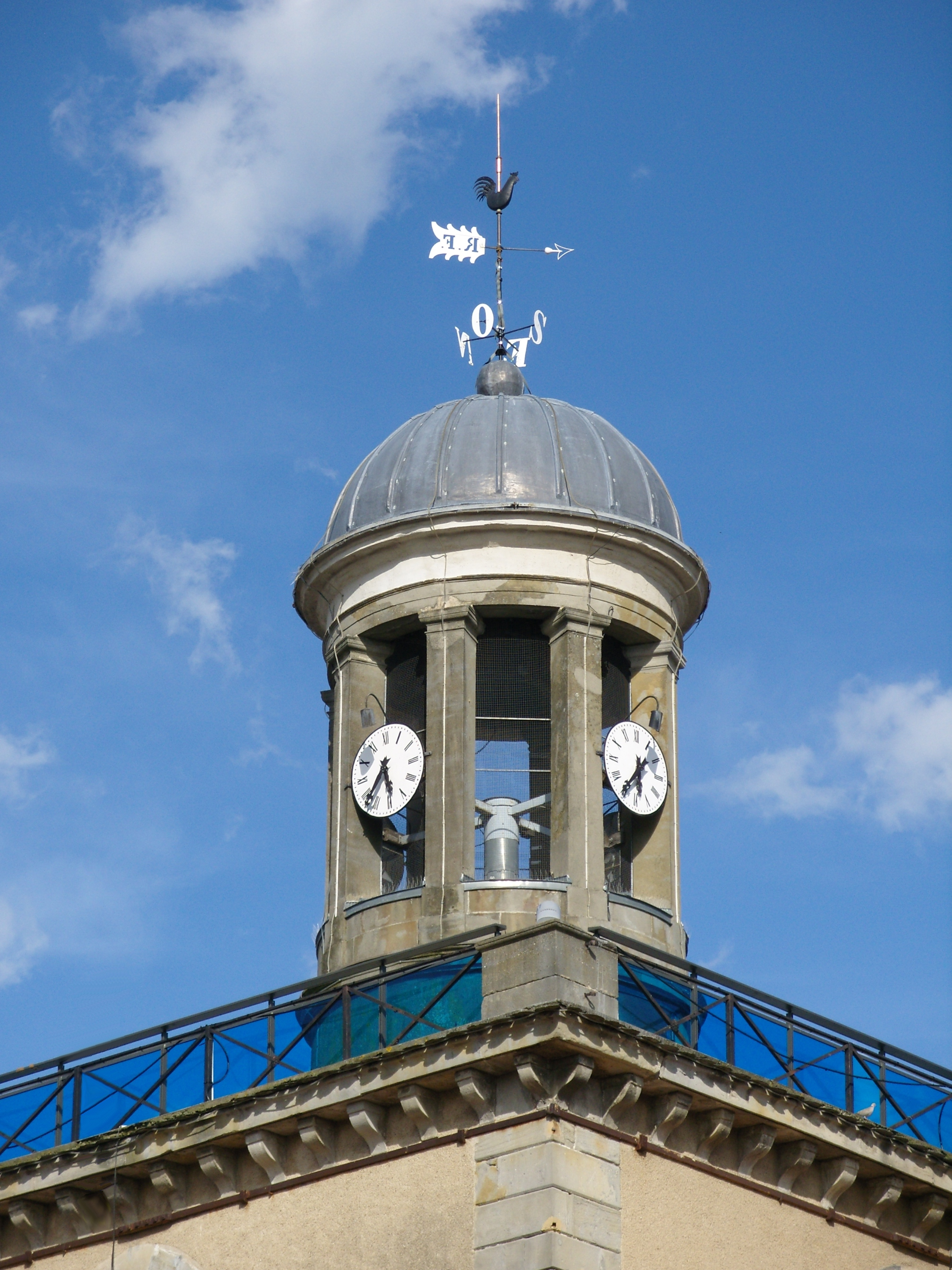
Belfry detail

== See also ==
- Communes of the Haute-Garonne department
