= The Flash (comic book) =

Comic book series

- Cover of The Flash #105 (February–March 1959), the first number of the series. Art by Carmine Infantino and Joe Giella

Publication information
- Publisher: DC Comics
- Schedule: List: Bimonthly: #105–113; #217–232;790-present Eight times a year: #114–157; #212–216; #233–256 Nine times a year: #158–211 Monthly: #257–350
- Format: Ongoing series
- Genre: Superhero
- Publication date: List: (vol. 1) February–March 1959 – October 1985 (vol. 2) June 1987 – March 2006; October 2007 – February 2009 (vol. 3) June 2010 – July 2011 (vol. 4) November 2011 – July 2016 (vol. 5) August 2016 – August 2023 (vol. 6) November 2023 – Present
- No. of issues: List: (vol. 1) 246 (#105–350) and 1 Annual (vol. 2) 249 (#1–247 plus issues numbered 0 and 1,000,000) and 13 Annuals (vol. 3) 12 (vol. 4) 56 (#1–52 plus issues numbered 0, 23.1, 23.2, 23.3) and 4 Annuals (vol. 5) 139 and 5 Annuals (vol. 6) 31 (as of March 2026 cover date)
- Main character(s): (vol. 1, 3, 4, and 5); Flash (Barry Allen) (vol. 2, 5, and 6); Flash (Wally West)

Creative team
- Created by: John Broome; Carmine Infantino
- Written by: List: (vol. 1): John Broome (105–122, 124–128, 130–136, 138–142, 146–149, 152–156, 158–161, 163–166, 168–69, 172–174, 176, 178, 182, 187–191, 193–94, 196, 205, 208–210, 212, 214–216, 229, 232, 328, 344) Gardner Fox (117, 123, 129, 137–38, 140, 143–146, 149–152, 154, 157–159, 162, 164, 166–67, 170–71, 177–78, 194, 201, 213–14, 229) Robert Kanigher (160–61, 192, 195, 197–206, 208, 211, 214, 229, 232; Annual 1) Cary Bates (179, 206, 209–212, 216, 218–305, 307–312, 314–350) Frank Robbins (180–181, 183–185) Martin Pasko (306–313) Steve Gerber (310–313) (vol. 2) Mike Baron (1–14; Annual 1) William Messner-Loebs (15–28, 30–61; Annual 2–3) Len Strazewski (29) Mark Waid (0, 62–129, 142–159, 162, 231–236, 1000000; Annual 4–6, 8) Gerard Jones (69–70) Michael Jan Friedman (102–105, 1000000; Annual 10) Brian Augustyn (118–129, 142–160, 162, Annual 10–12) Mark Millar (130–141) Grant Morrison (130–138) Joe Casey (151) Pat McGreal (161, 163) Geoff Johns (1/2, 164–225) Stuart Immonen (226) Kathryn Immonen (226) Joey Cavalieri (227–230) Keith Champagne (237) Tom Peyer (238–243; Annual 8) Alan Burnett (244–247) Craig Boldman (Annual 5) Mark Wheatley (Annual 7) Allan Gross (Annual 7) Peter Tomasi (Annual 9) Chuck Dixon (Annual 13) (vol. 3) Geoff Johns (vol. 4) Francis Manapul (1–25, 23.2; Annual 1) Brian Buccellato (1–25, 23.1–23.3, 27–29; Annual 1–2) Christos Gage (26) Robert Venditti (30–49; Annual 3) Van Jensen (30–52; Annual 3–4) (vol. 5) Joshua Williamson (1-88, 750–762, Annual 1–3) Kevin Shinick (763–766) Andy Lanning (767) Ron Marz (767) Jeremy Adams (768–800; Annual 2021, Annual 2022) (vol. 6) Simon Spurrier(1–25) Mark Waid (26–30) Christopher Cantwell (26–30) Ryan North (31–)
- Penciller: List: (vol. 1): Carmine Infantino Gil Kane Irv Novick Dick Dillin Dick Giordano Neal Adams Mike Grell Alex Saviuk (vol. 2): Jackson Guice Greg LaRocque Paul Pelletier Salvador Larroca Howard Porter Mike Wieringo (vol. 3) Francis Manapul Scott Kolins (vol. 4): Francis Manapul Brett Booth Jesus Merino (vol. 5): Carmine Di Giandomenico (vol. 6) Mike Deodato Gavin Guidry
- Inker: List: (vol. 1): Joe Giella Murphy Anderson Vince Colletta Frank McLaughlin (vol. 2): Larry Mahlstedt (vol. 3): (vol. 4): Norm Rapmund

The Flash is an ongoing American comic book series featuring the DC Comics superhero of the same name. Throughout its publication, the series has primarily focused on two characters who have worn the mantle of the Flash: Barry Allen, the second Flash (1959–1985, 2010–2020), and Wally West, the third Flash (1987–2008, 2021–present). The series began at issue #105, picking up its issue numbering from the anthology series Flash Comics which had featured Jay Garrick as the first Flash.

Although the Flash is a mainstay in the DC Comics stable, the series has been canceled and restarted several times. The first volume, starring Barry Allen, was canceled at issue #350 prior to the character's death in Crisis on Infinite Earths. A new series began in June 1987 with a new issue #1, starring Wally West as the new Flash. The second volume was briefly canceled in 2006 at issue #230 in the wake of the Infinite Crisis event in which Wally disappeared, and was replaced by a new series titled The Flash: The Fastest Man Alive starring Bart Allen as the fourth Flash. The following year, The Flash: The Fastest Man Alive was canceled and The Flash resumed publication from issue #231 with Wally as the Flash once again; however, this volume was ultimately canceled permanently in 2008 at issue #247.

Following Barry Allen's resurrection in Final Crisis and return to being the primary Flash in The Flash: Rebirth, a third volume starring Barry debuted in 2010. However, this volume was ultimately cancelled in the lead-up to the miniseries Flashpoint, which in turn led into The New 52 continuity reboot. A fourth volume was later launched in 2011 as part of the new continuity, with Barry Allen as the sole Flash; this volume ultimately concluded in 2016. A fifth volume was launched soon afterwards as part of the line-wide relaunch DC Rebirth.

In 2020, the series reverted to original numbering as of issue #750 by adding together all issues of The Flash from each volume. Wally West became the main character of the series again as of DC's line-wide relaunch Infinite Frontier, beginning with issue #768. Original numbering continued until issue #800. A sixth volume of The Flash, also starring Wally West, began as part of the Dawn of DC relaunch in September 2023.

== Publication history ==
=== Volume 1 (1959–1985) ===
Volume 1 starred Barry Allen as the Flash and the series assumed the numbering of the original Flash Comics with issue #105 (March 1959) written by John Broome and drawn by Carmine Infantino. Comics historian Les Daniels noted that "The Flash" was a streamlined, modernized version of much that had gone before, but done with such care and flair that the character seemed new to a new generation of fans. The Broome and Infantino collaboration saw the introduction of several supervillains many of whom became part of the Rogues. The Mirror Master first appeared in issue #105 and the following issue saw the debuts of Gorilla Grodd and the Pied Piper. Captain Boomerang first challenged the Flash in issue #117 (December 1960) and the 64th century villain Abra Kadabra was introduced in issue #128 (May 1962). Another villain from the future, Professor Zoom first appeared in issue #139 (September 1963).

Kid Flash and the Elongated Man were respectively introduced in issues #110 and 112 as allies of the Flash. One of the most notable issues of this era was issue #123 (September 1961), which featured the story titled "Flash of Two Worlds". In it, Allen meets his inspiration Jay Garrick, after accidentally being transported to a parallel universe where Garrick existed. In this previous continuity, Garrick and the other characters of the Golden Age only existed as comics characters in the mainline shared universe. This brought about a new concept in the formative stage of what would become the DC Universe, and gave birth to the current conceptualization featuring it as a multiverse.

Barry Allen married his longtime love interest Iris West in issue #165 (November 1966). Infantino's last issue was #174 (November 1967) and the next issue saw Ross Andru become the new artist of the series as well as featuring the second race between the Flash and Superman, two characters known for their super-speed powers.

The series presented metafictional stories featuring comics creators appearing within the Flash's adventures such as the "Flash — Fact Or Fiction" in issue #179 in which the Flash finds himself on "Earth Prime". He contacts the "one man on Earth who might believe his fantastic story and give him the money he needs. The editor of that Flash comic mag !" Julius Schwartz helps the Flash build a cosmic treadmill so that he can return home. Several years later, the series' longtime writer Cary Bates wrote himself into the story in issue #228. Four months after the cancellation of his own title, Green Lantern began a backup feature in The Flash #217 (August–September 1972) and appeared in most issues through The Flash #246 (January 1977) until his own solo series was revived. Schwartz, who had edited the title since 1959, left the series as of issue #269 (January 1979).

Bates wrote The Flash #275 (July 1979) wherein the title character's wife, Iris West Allen was killed. Don Heck became the artist of the series with issue #280 (December 1979) and drew it until #295 (March 1981). The Flash #300 (August 1981) was in the Dollar Comics format and featured a story by Bates and Infantino. Doctor Fate was featured in a series of back-up stories in The Flash from #306 (February 1982) to #313 (Sept. 1982) written by Martin Pasko and Steve Gerber and drawn by Keith Giffen. A major shakeup occurred in the title in the mid-1980s. The Flash inadvertently kills his wife's murderer, the Reverse-Flash, in The Flash #324 (August 1983). This led to an extended storyline titled "The Trial of the Flash" in which the hero must face the repercussions of his actions. Bates became the editor as well as the writer of The Flash title during this time and oversaw it until its cancellation in 1985. "The Trial of the Flash" was collected in a volume of the Showcase Presents series in 2011.

Shortly before Barry Allen's death in Crisis on Infinite Earths, the series was cancelled with issue #350 (October 1985). In the final issue of Crisis on Infinite Earths, Wally West, previously known as Allen's sidekick Kid Flash, stated his intent to take up his uncle's mantle as the Flash.

=== Volume 2 (1987–2006, 2007–2008) ===
Featuring Wally West as the main character, the second volume was launched by writer Mike Baron and artist Jackson Guice in June 1987. The second volume originally went in a different direction from the series starring Barry Allen by making Wally West a public figure with no secret identity, as well as making him more flawed: this Flash could not constantly maintain his super-speed because of his hypermetabolism, and would consume gargantuan amounts of food in order to continue operating at top speed. This metabolic limitation would later be continued into Barry Allen's character for the brief television series The Flash broadcast in 1990–91, as well as The Flash series which debuted in 2014, though to a lesser degree.

From issue #15 (August 1988) the series was taken over by writer William Messner-Loebs and artist Greg LaRocque. The new creative team introduced many aspects to the series that would become mainstays of the character Wally West, including inventing his love interest and eventual wife Linda Park, moving him from New York to Jay Garrick's hometown of Keystone City, and reintroducing the Pied Piper (a former foe of Barry Allen) as an ally whose positive influence helps Wally become more responsible and altruistic. In recognition of issue #53 (August 1991), in which the Pied Piper is revealed to be gay, The Flash won the inaugural GLAAD Media Award for Outstanding Comic Book in 1992. Messner-Loebs left the title at issue #61 (April 1992).

Mark Waid began his tenure on the title with issue #62 (May 1992); LaRocque departed the title with issue #79 (August 1993) and was replaced by Mike Wieringo. To help take Wally out of Barry and Jay's shadows, Waid made him much more powerful than either of his predecessors by introducing an extradimensional energy source referred to as the "Speed Force", through which he could channel near-limitless energy; the Speed Force has since become a cornerstone of Flash mythology. More emphasis was also placed upon the legacy of speedsters throughout DC history: Jay Garrick was reintroduced as a supporting character as of issue #73 (February 1993); former Quality Comics character Quicksilver was reinvented as the elder mentor character Max Mercury in issue #76 (May 1993); Barry Allen's future grandson Bart Allen, soon to become the speedster hero Impulse, was introduced in issue #92 (July 1994). Brian Augustyn became co-writer with Waid from issue #118 (October 1996) to the end of his tenure. For a period of one year, over issues #130–141 (October 1997 – September 1998), Waid and Augustyn stepped away from the series and were replaced by co-writers Mark Millar and Grant Morrison. Wally West married Linda Park in issue #159 (April 2000), Waid and Augustyn's last regular issue on the title.

When writer Geoff Johns stepped aboard with issue #164 (September 2000), he refocused the character on some aspects of tales starring Barry Allen from the Silver Age of Comic Books by putting more focus on the Rogues, some of which were new incarnations of old characters, and spending single issues on building their psychology. Johns created Zoom, the third of the Reverse-Flashes. He also fleshed out the environmental character of Keystone City in an attempt to make it unique in comparison to other fictional DC cities such as Metropolis or Gotham City, while also reintroducing Barry's hometown of Central City and having Wally split his time near-equally between the two locations. Following issue #200 (September 2003), Wally's secret identity was restored. Johns ended his run with issue #225 (October 2005).

In the wake of Wally West's disappearance in Infinite Crisis, DC canceled The Flash (vol. 2) with issue #230 (March 2006) in favor of a new series launched as part of the "One Year Later" event, starring Bart Allen as the Flash. The new series, titled The Flash: The Fastest Man Alive, ran only 13 issues and ended with Bart's death. The Flash (vol. 2) resumed with issue #231 (October 2007), with the return of Wally West as the Flash; Wally and Linda's children Iris and Jai, both speedsters, became major supporting characters. Mark Waid was brought back as writer but departed after six issues, after which the series brought in new writers for each new story arc. The series was canceled again at issue #247 in late 2008 with the return of Barry Allen in the event series Final Crisis.

=== Volume 3 (2010–2011) ===
Variant incentive cover for The Flash (vol. 3) #1 (June 2010). Art by Tony Harris.

Spinning out of Final Crisis, writer Geoff Johns and artist Ethan Van Sciver created The Flash: Rebirth, a 6-issue mini-series bringing Barry Allen back to a leading role in the DC Universe as the primary Flash. Barry Allen is also an integral character in the crossover event Blackest Night, and had a self-titled limited series tying into the main event. In 2010, DC Comics announced that after the completion of The Flash: Rebirth and Blackest Night, Geoff Johns would return to writing a new Flash ongoing series with artist Francis Manapul. In January 2010, DC Comics announced that the series' opening arc would be launched under the banner of Brightest Day, a line-wide aftermath story to the crossover "Blackest Night". In April 2010, DC released The Flash: Secret Files and Origins 2010 one-shot, setting the stage for the status quo of the new series. It was followed one week later with the release of The Flash (vol. 3) #1. On June 1, 2011, it was announced that all series taking place within the shared DC Universe would be either canceled or relaunched with new #1 issues, after a new continuity was created in the wake of the Flashpoint event. The Flash was no exception, and the first issue of the new series was released in September 2011.

=== Volume 4 (2011–2016) ===
In September 2011, The New 52 rebooted DC's continuity. In this new timeline, DC Comics relaunched The Flash with issue #1, with writing and art handled by Francis Manapul and Brian Buccellato. As with all of the titles associated with the DC relaunch, Barry Allen appears to be about five years younger than the previous incarnation of the character. Superheroes at large have appeared only in the past five years, and are viewed with at best, suspicion, and at worst, outright hostility. In this new continuity, Barry's marriage to Iris West never took place, and he is instead in a relationship with longtime co-worker Patty Spivot. In this new series, the Flash draws deeper into the Speed Force, enhancing his mental abilities while still trying to get a full grasp on his powers, which he does not yet exert total control over.

As revealed in issue #0 of this series, Barry Allen's father Henry Allen was placed in prison for the murder of his wife Nora. While the evidence seems to indicate his father's guilt, Barry makes proving his father's innocence a priority. The murder occurred shortly after Barry returned victorious from a school spelling bee, and Barry placed the trophy he won on his mother's grave in her memory. Barry is also part of the main cast of the relaunched Justice League series, making his debut in the series' second issue.

Writers Robert Venditti and Van Jensen and artist Brett Booth became the new creative team on The Flash as of issue #30 (June 2014). This run introduced the New 52 incarnation of Wally West as a troubled twelve-year-old, and featured him first acquiring super-speed powers; it also reintroduced the original Reverse-Flash, Eobard Thawne, to the new continuity. This volume of The Flash concluded with issue #52 (July 2016).

=== Volume 5 (2016–2023) ===
The fifth volume of The Flash was written in its entirety by Joshua Williamson. As part of the line-wide relaunch DC Rebirth, Williamson's run began with the one-shot The Flash: Rebirth (vol. 2) #1 (August 2016) and continued from The Flash (vol. 5) #1 (August 2016) on a twice-monthly schedule. This volume starred Barry Allen, carrying over from the New 52 volume, but also featured various other speedsters as supporting characters. Among them was the original incarnation of Wally West, who was revealed to have been lost in the Speed Force and erased from everyone's memories; the New 52 incarnation, thereafter referred to as Wallace West, was retconned to be a separate character and gained a superhero identity as the new Kid Flash. Other new speedster characters introduced in this volume included new antagonist Godspeed, and Avery Ho as the Flash of China.

This volume of The Flash crossed over twice with Batman. The crossover event "The Button", central to the over-arcing DC Rebirth story and setting up the event miniseries Doomsday Clock, ran through issues #21–22 (June–July 2017). The story arc "The Price", a tie-in to the event comic Heroes in Crisis, ran through issues #64–65 (April 2019).

Following issue #88 (April 2020), numbering on The Flash was reset to add together all issue counts from volumes 1–5. Joshua Williamson's run on the series continued under the new numbering, beginning with an oversized celebratory issue #750 (May 2020). Joshua Williamson was ultimately the longest-serving writer to stay on a given title from the beginning of DC Rebirth, concluding his run of 101 regular issues on the title with #762 (September 2020). This was followed by a four-issue story arc written by Kevin Shinick, and a one-issue installment of the crossover event "Endless Winter".

As part of the line-wide relaunch Infinite Frontier, Jeremy Adams began as the ongoing writer on The Flash with issue #768 as the series reverted to a monthly publishing schedule. Wally West resumed his role as the main Flash of the series, based in Central City, after Barry Allen's departure to join the multiversal team Justice Incarnate. Wally's marriage to Linda Park and his life with their children Irey and Jai was also restored to its pre-New 52 status quo. Jai took on the superhero name Surge, while Irey eventually chose the new name Thunderheart. Linda also temporarily developed super-speed while pregnant with her and Wally's third child, a boy named Wade. Meanwhile, Wally also became employed by fellow superhero Mister Terrific (Michael Holt) as an engineer at Terrifictech. Adams also introduced recurring character Gold Beetle, a time-traveler from the future destined to become superhero partners with Wally West and then Bart Allen. Barry Allen returned as a supporting character in the story arc "The Search for Barry Allen", a tie-in to Dark Crisis, and he and Iris West once again became engaged to be married in issue #796 (June 2023).

The Flash returned to a twice-monthly publishing schedule with issue #790 (March 2023), at the beginning of the story arc "The One-Minute War". A tie-in one-shot comic The Flash: One-Minute War Special (March 2023) was published in the same month. The twice-monthly schedule continued until Adams' run as writer ended with issue #800 (August 2023), after which the series was relaunched with a new volume.

=== Volume 6 (2023–present) ===
In March 2023, it was announced that The Flash would be relaunched as part of the Dawn of DC initiative with a new issue #1, while retaining a legacy numbering of #801. The new run would be written by Si Spurrier with art by Mike Deodato. In July 2025, it was announced by Spurrier that his final issue of the series would be issue #25, which was published in September 2025. Following a short 5-issue interim by Mark Waid, Christopher Cantwell, and Vasco Georgiev that tied into the events of DC K.O., it was announced in December 2025 that Ryan North and Gavin Guidry would serve as the new creative team on The Flash as part of the DC Next Level publishing initiative beginning with issue #31 in March 2026.

== Collected editions ==
=== The Flash Archives ===
Title	Material collected	Pages	Publication Date	ISBN
Flash Archives Volume 1	Flash Comics #104, Showcase #4, #8, #13–14, The Flash vol. 1 #105–108	224	June 12, 1996	978-1-56389-139-7
Flash Archives Volume 2	The Flash vol. 1 #109–116	224	March 22, 2000	978-1-56389-606-4
Flash Archives Volume 3	The Flash vol. 1 #117–124	224	January 30, 2002	978-1-56389-799-3
Flash Archives Volume 4	The Flash vol. 1 #125–132	216	April 26, 2006	978-1-4012-0771-7
Flash Archives Volume 5	The Flash vol. 1 #133–141	248	March 25, 2009	1-4012-2151-3
Flash Archives Volume 6	The Flash vol. 1 #142–150	240	August 1, 2012	978-1-4012-3514-7

=== The Flash Chronicles ===
Title	Material collected	Pages	Publication Date	ISBN
The Flash Chronicles Volume 1	Showcase #4, 8, 13–14, The Flash vol. 1 #105–106	160	September 23, 2009	978-1-4012-2471-4
The Flash Chronicles Volume 2	The Flash vol. 1 #107–112	160	September 29, 2010	978-1-4012-2884-2
The Flash Chronicles Volume 3	The Flash vol. 1 #113–118	160	August 8, 2012	978-1-4012-3490-4
The Flash Chronicles Volume 4	The Flash vol. 1 #119–124	160	April 10, 2013	978-1-4012-3831-5

=== Showcase Presents: The Flash ===
Title	Material collected	Pages	Publication Date	ISBN
Showcase Presents: The Flash Volume 1	Flash Comics #104, Showcase #4, 8, 13–14, The Flash vol. 1 #105–119	512	May 16, 2007	1-4012-1327-8
Showcase Presents: The Flash Volume 2	The Flash vol. 1 #120–140	552	June 18, 2008	1-4012-1805-9
Showcase Presents: The Flash Volume 3	The Flash vol. 1 #141–161	520	August 12, 2009	978-1-4012-2297-0
Showcase Presents: The Flash Volume 4	The Flash vol. 1 #162–184	528	October 24, 2012	1-4012-3679-0
Showcase Presents: The Trial of the Flash	The Flash vol. 1 #323–327, 329–336, 340–350	592	August 10, 2011	1-4012-3182-9

=== The Flash Vol. 1 (1959–1985) ===
Title	Material collected	Pages	Publication Date	ISBN
The Flash: The Silver Age Vol. 1	Showcase #4, 8, 13–14, The Flash vol. 1 #105–116	424	June 15, 2016	978-1401261108
The Flash: The Silver Age Vol. 2	The Flash vol. 1 #117–132	424	September 27, 2017	978-1401270889
The Flash: The Silver Age Vol. 3	The Flash vol. 1 #133–147	400	April 4, 2018	978-1401278267
The Flash: The Silver Age Vol. 4	The Flash vol. 1 #148–163	384	March 12, 2019	978-1401288235
The Flash Omnibus Vol. 1	Flash Comics #104, Showcase #4, 8, 13–14, The Flash vol. 1 #105–132	864	September 24, 2014	978-1401251499
The Flash: The Silver Age Omnibus Vol. 1	Flash Comics #104, Showcase #4, 8, 13–14, The Flash vol. 1 #105–132	864	December 24, 2018	978-1401290757
The Flash: The Silver Age Omnibus Vol. 2	The Flash vol. 1 #133–163	784	January 17, 2017	978-1401265380
The Flash: The Silver Age Omnibus Vol. 3	The Flash vol. 1 #164–199	800	July 24, 2018	978-1401281045
Flash vs. The Rogues	Showcase #8, The Flash vol. 1 #105–106, 110, 113, 117, 122, 140, 155	144	November 25, 2009	978-1401224974
DC Comics Classics Library: Flash of Two Worlds	The Flash vol. 1 #123, 129, 137, 151, 170, 173	160	August 5, 2009	978-1401222987
Flash of Two Worlds: Deluxe Edition	The Flash vol. 1 #123, 129, 137, 151, 170, 173	160	March 3, 2020	978-1401294595
The Flash: The Death of Iris West	The Flash vol. 1 #270–284	280	June 1, 2021	978-1779509673

=== The Flash vol. 2 (1987–2006) Old Editions ===
Title	Material collected	Pages	Publication Date	ISBN
The Flash: Born to Run	The Flash vol. 2 #62–65, Annual #8, 80-Page Giant #1, Speed Force #1	128	May 12, 1999	978-1563895043
The Flash: The Return of Barry Allen	The Flash vol. 2 #72–78	178	June 5, 1996	978-1563892684
The Flash: Terminal Velocity	The Flash vol. 2 #0, 95–100	186	September 26, 1995	978-1563892493
The Flash: Dead Heat	The Flash vol. 2 #108–111 & Impulse #10,11	144	July 6, 2000	978-1563896231
The Flash: Race Against Time	The Flash vol. 2 #112–118	168	June 13, 2001	978-1563897214
The Flash: Emergency Stop	The Flash vol. 2 #130–135	144	January 21, 2009	978-1401221775
The Flash: The Human Race	The Flash vol. 2 #136–141 and Secret Origins vol. 2 #50	160	June 10, 2009	978-1401222390
The Flash: Wonderland	The Flash vol. 2 #164–169	144	October 31, 2007	978-1401214890
The Flash: Blood Will Run	The Flash vol. 2 #170–176, The Flash: Iron Heights, The Flash Secret Files #3	240	March 13, 2002	978-1401216474
The Flash: Rogues	The Flash vol. 2 #177–182	144	January 29, 2003	978-1563899508
The Flash: Crossfire	The Flash vol. 2 #183–191	224	February 11, 2004	978-1401201951
The Flash: Blitz	The Flash vol. 2 #192–200	224	July 8, 2004	978-1401203351
The Flash: Ignition	The Flash vol. 2 #201–206	144	February 9, 2005	978-1401204631
The Flash: The Secret of Barry Allen	The Flash vol. 2 #207–211, #213–217	240	July 20, 2005	978-1401207236
The Flash: Rogue War	The Flash vol. 2 #212, #218, #220–225	208	January 18, 2006	978-1401209247

=== The Flash vol. 2 (1987–2006) ===
Title	Material collected	Pages	Publication Date	ISBN
Paperback
The Flash: Savage Velocity	The Flash vol. 2 #1–18, Annual #1	480	September 1, 2020	978-1401299576
The Flash by Mark Waid Book One	The Flash vol. 2 #62–68, Annual #4–5, Flash Special #1	368	December 7, 2016	978-1401267353
The Flash by Mark Waid Book Two	The Flash vol. 2 #69–79, Annual #6, Green Lantern vol. 3 #30–31, 40	432	April 26, 2017	978-1401268442
The Flash by Mark Waid Book Three	The Flash vol. 2 #80–94	368	October 11, 2017	978-1401273927
The Flash by Mark Waid Book Four	The Flash vol. 2 #0, #95–105, Annual #8	368	April 4, 2018	978-1401278212
The Flash by Mark Waid Book Five	The Flash vol. 2 #106–118, Impulse #10–11	368	October 17, 2018	978-1401284602
The Flash by Mark Waid Book Six	The Flash vol. 2 #119–129, Green Lantern and The Flash: Faster Friends, Flash Plus Nightwing #1; material from Showcase '96 #12, DC Universe Holiday Bash #1	440	May 29, 2019	978-1401293802
The Flash by Grant Morrison & Mark Millar	The Flash vol. 2 #130–141, Green Lantern vol. 3 #96, Green Arrow vol. 2 #130; material from The Flash 80-Page Giant #1, JLA Secret Files #1	334	April 20, 2016	978-1-4012-6102-3
The Flash by Mark Waid Book Seven	The Flash vol. 2 #142–150, #1000000, The Life Story of the Flash; material from The Flash Secret Files #1, Speed Force #1, The Flash 80-Page Giant #1	448	May 19, 2020	978-1779500199
The Flash by Mark Waid Book Eight	The Flash vol. 2 #151–163, Annual #12, The Flash Secret Files #2	400	June 30, 2021	978-1779510105
The Flash By Geoff Johns Book One	The Flash vol. 2 #164–176, The Flash: Iron Heights #1	368	November 25, 2015	978-1401258733
The Flash By Geoff Johns Book Two	The Flash vol. 2 #177–188, The Flash: Our Worlds at War #1, The Flash Secret Files #3, and DC First: Flash/Superman #1	408	May 18, 2016	978-1401261016
The Flash By Geoff Johns Book Three	The Flash vol. 2 #189–200	350	October 26, 2016	978-1401264987
The Flash By Geoff Johns Book Four	The Flash vol. 2 #201–213	320	November 29, 2017	978-1401273651
The Flash By Geoff Johns Book Five	The Flash vol. 2 #214–225, #1/2, Wonder Woman vol. 2 #214	336	July 10, 2018	978-1401281076
Omnibus & Hardcovers
The Flash Omnibus by William Messner-Loebs and Greg LaRocque Omnibus Volume 1	The Flash vol. 2 #1-28, The Flash Annual #1-3, Secret Origins Annual #2, and pages from Invasion! #2-3	984	August 6, 2024	978-1401230685
The Flash Omnibus by Mark Waid Volume 1	The Flash vol. 2 #62-91, The Flash Annual #4-6, Green Lantern #30-31, The Flash Special #1 and Justice League Quarterly #10	1088	August 11, 2022	9781779513632
The Flash Omnibus by Mark Waid Volume 2	The Flash vol. 2 #0, #92-129, The Flash Annual #7-9, Zero Hour: Crisis In Time #4, Impulse #10-11, The Flash Plus Nightwing #1 and a story from DC Universe Holiday Bash #1	1216	February 4, 2025	9781779528414
The Flash by Grant Morrison and Mark Millar: The Deluxe Edition	The Flash vol. 2 #130-41, Green Lantern #96, Green Arrow #130, material from The Flash 80-Page Giant #1 and Secret Origins "50	416	February 25, 2025	9781799500421
The Flash Omnibus by Mark Waid Volume 3	The Flash vol. 2 #142-163, The Flash Annual #10-13, Showcase ’96 #12, Green Lantern/Flash: Faster Friends Part 1 #1, Flash/Green Lantern: Faster Friends Part 2 #2, The Flash Secret Files and Origins#1-2, Speed Force #1, The Life Story of the Flash #1, The Flash 80-Page Giant #1-2, and Flash One Million #1	1184	February 17, 2026	9781799507352
The Flash Omnibus by Geoff Johns Volume 1	The Flash vol. 2 #164–191, The Flash: Our Worlds at War #1, The Flash: Iron Heights, The Flash Secret Files and Origins #3, DC First: Flash and Superman #1	848	December 18, 2019	978-1401295325
The Flash Omnibus by Geoff Johns Volume 2	The Flash vol. 2 #192-225, Wonder Woman vol. 2 #214, The Flash: The Secret of Barry Allen #1	872	February 2, 2021	978-1779507501
The Flash Omnibus by Geoff Johns Volume 3	Final Crisis: Rogue's Revenge #1-3; The Flash: Rebirth #1-6; The Flash vol. 3 #1-12; Blackest Night: The Flash #1-3; The Flash Secret Files and Origins 2010 #1; Flashpoint #1-5	880	January 25, 2022	978-1779513458
Flashpoint: The 10th Anniversary Omnibus	Booster Gold #44-47, Flash #9-12, Flashpoint #1-5, Flashpoint: Reverse-Flash #1, Flashpoint: Abin Sur the Green Lantern #1-3, Flashpoint: Emperor Aquaman #1-3, Flashpoint: Batman Knight of Vengeance #1-3, Flashpoint: Citizen Cold #1-3, Flashpoint: The World of Flashpoint #1-3, Flashpoint: Deadman and the Flying Graysons #1-3, Flashpoint: Deathstroke & the Curse of the Ravager #1-3, Flashpoint: Lois Lane and the Resistance #1-3, Flashpoint: The Outsider #1-3, Flashpoint: Secret Seven #1-3, Flashpoint: The Canterbury Cricket #1, Flashpoint: Wonder Woman and the Furies #1-3, Flashpoint: Kid Flash Lost #1-3, Flashpoint: Project Superman #1-3, Flashpoint: Frankenstein & the Creatures of the Unknown #1-3, Flashpoint: Green Arrow Industries #1, Flashpoint: Grodd of War #1, Flashpoint: Hal Jordan #1-3, Flashpoint: The Legion of Doom #1-3, and Absolute Flashpoint #1	1512	April 28, 2021	978-1779509772

=== The Flash: The Fastest Man Alive (2007–2008) ===
Title	Material collected	Pages	Publication Date	ISBN
The Flash: The Fastest Man Alive: Lightning in a Bottle	Flash: The Fastest Man Alive #1–6	144	March 21, 2007	978-1401212292
The Flash: The Fastest Man Alive: Full Throttle	Flash: The Fastest Man Alive #7–13, All-Flash #1, a story from DCU Infinite Holiday Special #1	208	December 28, 2007	978-1401215675

=== The Flash vol. 2 continued (2007–2008) ===
Title	Material collected	Pages	Publication Date	ISBN
The Flash: The Wild Wests	The Flash vol. 2 #231–237	160	August 6, 2008	978-1401218287

=== The Flash vol. 3 (2010–2011) ===
Title	Material collected	Pages	Publication Date	ISBN
The Flash: Rebirth	The Flash: Rebirth #1–6	168	Hardcover: May 3, 2010 Softcover: April 27, 2011	Hardcover: 978-1401225681 Softcover: 978-1401230012
The Flash Vol. 1: The Dastardly Death of the Rogues	The Flash vol. 3 #1–7, The Flash Secret Files 2010	228	Hardcover: February 9, 2011 Softcover: January 11, 2012	Hardcover: 978-1401229702 Softcover: 978-1401231958
The Flash Vol. 2: The Road to Flashpoint	The Flash vol. 3 #8–12	128	Hardcover: November 16, 2011 Softcover: September 26, 2012	Hardcover: 978-1401232795 Softcover: 978-1401234485
The Flash by Geoff Johns Book Six	Final Crisis: Rogues' Revenge #1–3, The Flash: Rebirth #1–6, Blackest Night: The Flash #1–3	384	August 27, 2019	978-1401292638

=== The Flash vol. 4 (2011–2016) ===
#	Title	Material collected	Pages	Publication Date	ISBN
Paperback
1	Move Forward	The Flash vol. 4 #1–8	192	August 20, 2013	978-1401235536
2	Rogues Revolution	The Flash vol. 4 #9–12, #0, and The Flash Annual #1	176	February 11, 2014	978-1401240318
3	Gorilla Warfare	The Flash vol. 4 #13–19	176	August 19, 2014	978-1401242749
4	Reverse	The Flash vol. 4 #20–25 and #23.2: Reverse-Flash #1	176	January 20, 2015	978-1401247133
5	History Lessons	The Flash vol. 4 #26–29 and The Flash Annual #2	144	September 8, 2015	978-1401249502
6	Out of Time	The Flash vol. 4 #30–35, The Flash Annual #3 and The Flash: Futures End #1	208	January 19, 2016	978-1401254278
7	Savage World	The Flash vol. 4 #36–40 and Secret Origins vol. 3 #7	144	August 9, 2016	978-1401258757
8	Zoom	The Flash vol. 4 #41–47 and The Flash Annual #4	224	November 22, 2016	978-1401263669
9	Full Stop	The Flash vol. 4 #48–52	168	August 17, 2017	978-1401269258
The Flash: Starting Line (DC Essential Edition)		The Flash vol. 4 #0–12, The Flash Annual #1	344	October 30, 2018	978-1401284763
Omnibus
The Flash by Francis Manapul and Brian Buccellato Omnibus		The Flash vol. 4 #0–25, #23.1: Grodd #1, #23.2: Reverse-Flash #1, #23.3: The Rogues #1, The Flash Annual vol. 4 #1-2	709	November 22, 2016	978-1401261030
The Flash: The Road to Rebirth Omnibus		The Flash vol. 4 #25-52, The Flash Annual vol. 4 #3, Secret Origins #7, The Flash: Futures End #1, and DC Universe: Rebirth #1	872	April 14, 2026	978-1799507833

=== The Flash vol. 5 (2016–2023) ===
#	Title	Material collected	Pages	Publication Date	ISBN
Paperback
1	Lightning Strikes Twice	The Flash: Rebirth #1, The Flash vol. 5 #1–8	216	January 24, 2017	978-1401267841
2	Speed of Darkness	The Flash vol. 5 #9–13	128	May 23, 2017	978-1401268930
3	Rogues Reloaded	The Flash vol. 5 #14–20	168	August 1, 2017	978-1401271572
4	Running Scared	The Flash vol. 5 #23–27	136	November 21, 2017	978-1401274627
5	Negative	The Flash vol. 5 #28–32	128	March 27, 2018	978-1401277277
6	Cold Day in Hell	The Flash vol. 5 #34–38, Annual #1	128	June 19, 2018	978-1401280789
7	Perfect Storm	The Flash vol. 5 #39–45	184	October 2, 2018	978-1401284527
8	Flash War	The Flash vol. 5 #46–51, a story from Annual #1	160	December 18, 2018	978-1401283506
9	Reckoning of the Forces	The Flash vol. 5 #52–57	160	April 2, 2019	978-1401288556
10	Force Quest	The Flash vol. 5 #58–63	144	September 24, 2019	978-1401291419
11	The Greatest Trick of All	The Flash vol. 5 #66–69, Annual #2	144	February 11, 2020	978-1779500328
	Year One	The Flash vol. 5 #70–75	168	November 19, 2019	978-1401299347
12	Death and the Speed Force	The Flash vol. 5 #76–81	144	June 9, 2020	978-1779503992
13	Rogues Reign	The Flash vol. 5 #82–87	152	November 17, 2020	978-1779505774
14	The Flash Age	The Flash vol. 5 #88, #750–755, Annual #3	216	May 11, 2021	978-1779509239
15	Finish Line	The Flash #756–762	168	October 12, 2021	978-1779513168
16	Wally West Returns	The Flash #763–771, 2021 Annual #1	280	July 26, 2022	978-1779515360
17	Eclipsed	The Flash #772–779	216	December 20, 2022	978-1779517449
18	The Search For Barry Allen	The Flash #780–789, 2022 Annual #1	292	June 27, 2023	978-1779520173
19	One-Minute War	The Flash #790–796, The Flash: One-Minute War Special #1.	244	January 23, 2024	978-1779520883
20	Time Heist	The Flash #797–799, four stories from #800.	128	April 23, 2024	978-1779525017
Deluxe Hardcovers
Batman/The Flash: The Button		The Flash vol. 5 #21–22, Batman vol. 3 #21–22	104	October 17, 2017	978-1401276447
Heroes In Crisis: The Price and Other Stories		The Flash vol. 5 #64–65, Annual #2, Batman vol. 3 #64–65, Green Arrow vol. 6 #45, 48–50	248	October 9, 2019	978-1401299644
The Rebirth Deluxe Edition Book 1		The Flash: Rebirth #1, #1–13	336	August 1, 2017	978-1401271589
The Rebirth Deluxe Edition Book 2		The Flash vol. 5 #14–27	244	May 1, 2018	978-1401278427
The Rebirth Deluxe Edition Book 3		The Flash vol. 5 #28–38, Annual #1, DC Universe Holiday Special #1	264	October 2, 2018	978-1401281403
The Rebirth Deluxe Edition Book 4		The Flash vol. 5 #28–38	352	Canceled	978-1401289393
Omnibus
The Flash by Joshua Williamson Omnibus Vol. 1		The Flash: Rebirth #1, The Flash vol. 5 #1–35, Batman vol. 3 #21–22, Hal Jordan and the Green Lantern Corps #32, Justice League #32-33, material from DC Holiday Special 2017 #1	1008	April 9, 2024	978-1779526984
The Flash by Joshua Williamson Omnibus Vol. 2		The Flash vol. 5 #36–69, Batman vol. 3 #64-665, The Flash Annual #1-2	968	September 23, 2025	978-1799502463
The Flash by Joshua Williamson Omnibus Vol. 3		The Flash vol. 5 #70–88, #750-762 and #800,The Flash Annual #3, DC Cybernetic Summer #1 and Dark Nights: Death Metal Speed Metal #1	888	July 21, 2026	978-1799508540

=== The Flash vol. 6 (2023–present) ===
#	Title	Material collected	Pages	Publication Date	ISBN
Paperback
1	Strange Attractor	The Flash vol. 6 #1-6, Titans: Beast World Tour: Central City #1, and a story from The Flash vol. 5 #800	200	July 9, 2024	978-1779525468
2	Until Time Stands Still	The Flash vol. 6 #7-13 and The Flash 2024 Annual #1	188	December 10, 2024	978-1779528445
3	As Above	The Flash vol. 6 #14–19	136	June 24, 2025	978-1799501343
4	Bad Moon Rising	The Flash vol. 6 #20–25 and The Flash: Bad Moon Rising Special #1	184	December 23, 2025	978-1799503118

=== Other collections ===
Title	Material collected	Pages	Publication Date	ISBN
Greatest Flash Stories Ever Told	Flash Comics #1, 66, 86, Comic Cavalcade #24, Showcase #4, The Flash vol. 1 #107, 113, 119, 124–125, 137, 143, 148, 179, DC Special Series #1, The Flash vol. 2 #2	288	Hardcover: December 11, 1990 Softcover: April 21, 1992	Hardcover: 978-0930289812 Softcover: 978-0930289843
Flash: The Greatest Stories Ever Told	Flash Comics #86,104, The Flash vol. 1 #123,155,165,179, DC Special Series #11, The Flash Vol. 2 #91	208	August 15, 2007	978-1401213725
Flash: A Celebration of 75 Years	Flash Comics #1, 104, All-Flash #31, Showcase #4, The Flash vol. 1 #110, 123, 125, 174, 215, 233, 275, Superman #199, Crisis on Infinite Earths #8, The Flash vol. 2 #1, 0, 225, Secret Origins Annual #2, Flash: The Fastest Man Alive #1, Flash: Rebirth #1, Flashpoint #5, Flash vol. 3 #9	472	April 1, 2015	978-1401251789
The Flash: 80 Years of The Fastest Man Alive The Deluxe Edition	Flash Comics #1, 89, 96, Showcase #4, The Flash vol. 1 #106, 110, 123, 155, 275, 300, The Flash vol. 2 #54, 91, 133, 182, The Flash vol. 4 #0, DC Holiday Special 2017 "Hope for the Holidays", The Flash Giant vol. 1 #2, previously unpublished story "The Flash: Strange Confession"	400	November 12, 2019	978-1401298135
Flash Rogues: Captain Cold	Showcase #8, The Flash vol. 1 #150, 297, The Flash vol. 2 #28, 182, Flashpoint: Citizen Cold #1, Flash vol. 3 #6, 17, and Flash Secret Files #3	160	August 22, 2018	978-1401281595
Flash Rogues: Reverse-Flash	The Flash vol. 1 #139, 283, The Flash vol. 2 #197, The Flash vol.3 #8, The Flash vol. 4 #23.2, The Flash vol. 5 #25, Batman vol. 3 #21, an entry from Who's Who: The Definitive Directory of the DC Universe #19	168	January 16, 2019	978-1-4012-8925-6
Superman vs. The Flash	Superman #199, The Flash vol. 1 #175, World’s Finest Comics #198–199, DC Comics Presents #1–2	208	May 1, 2005	978-1401204563
Wonder Woman: The Cheetah	Wonder Woman vol. 1 #6 and 274–275, Wonder Woman vol. 2 #9 and 214, The Flash vol. 2 #219, Justice League vol. 2 #13–14, Wonder Woman vol. 3 #23.1, Wonder Woman vol. 5 #8	216	March 17, 2020	978-1401291662
Justice League: Endless Winter	Justice League: Endless Winter #1–2, The Flash vol. 1 #767, Superman: Endless Winter Special #1, Aquaman vol. 8 #66, Justice League vol. 4 #58, Teen Titans: Endless Winter Special #1, Justice League Dark vol. 2 #29, Black Adam: Endless Winter Special #1	232	Hardcover: November 16, 2021	Hardcover: 978-1779511539
Life Story of the Flash	Original Graphic Novel	96	Hardcover: October 22, 1997 Softcover: August 12, 1998	Hardcover: 978-1563893650 Softcover: 978-1563893896
Flash & Green Lantern: The Brave and the Bold	Flash and Green Lantern:The Brave and the Bold #1–6	144	Softcover: March 21, 2001 Deluxe Edition: April 9, 2019	Softcover: 978-1563897085 Deluxe Edition: 978-1401288136
Flash: Mercury Falling	Impulse #62–67	144	May 6, 2009	978-1401222604
Flash: Season Zero	Flash: Season Zero #1–12	264	September 16, 2015	978-1401257712
