= Bondi Digital Publishing =

American Digital Media Company

Bondi Digital Publishing is a privately held New York City-based digital media company that specializes in publishing complete digital archives of major consumer magazines.

Founded by David Anthony and Murat Aktar in 2004, Bondi Digital Publishing began by developing the technology that allowed The New Yorker to publish The Complete New Yorker in September 2005, a digital archive of its entire print archive on 8 DVD-ROMs. In 2006, The New Yorker used Bondi's technology again when they released their digital archive on a portable hard drive.

In 2007, Bondi launched its publishing division when it partnered with Rolling Stone and Playboy magazines to publish both companies' entire print archives in searchable digital archives on DVD-ROM. First published in the fall of 2007, Rolling Stone Cover To Cover, the First 40 Years (ISBN 978-0-9795261-0-7) and Playboy Cover to Cover, the 50s (ISBN 978-0-9795261-1-4) were part of the company's Cover to Cover Series of digital archive box sets. The company marketed the series through national book and media retailers.

In a September 2007 interview, Anthony stated "By the holiday 2008 season, we hope to have six - eight Cover To Cover titles in the line.". However, as of March, 2009, the only public release other than the aforementioned Rolling Stone and Playboy sets was a rerelease of the Rolling Stone set without the extras included in the original. A Playboy Cover to Cover, the 60s set was mentioned in the interview, but it, along with subsequent sets, is now being released exclusively through the website http://playboyarchive.com/

In March 2009, Bondi announced that using its technology, select digital back issues of Playboy would be available for free viewing at http://playboyarchive.com. It also announced that https://web.archive.org/web/20111006215634/http://covertocover.com/ would be changing in the Summer of 2009 to allow users to browse, search and purchase digital back issues from the entire print runs of Playboy and Rolling Stone using Bondi's online magazine application, but as of May 2011, this has not occurred. Instead, in April 2010, Rolling Stone's website began offering subscribers access to their digital archive. In November 2010, Bondi released a portable hard drive for Playboy, this time containing every issue from 1953 to 2010. In January 2011, it was announced that a Playboy iPad app would be available in March.
