= Geoscientist In Training =

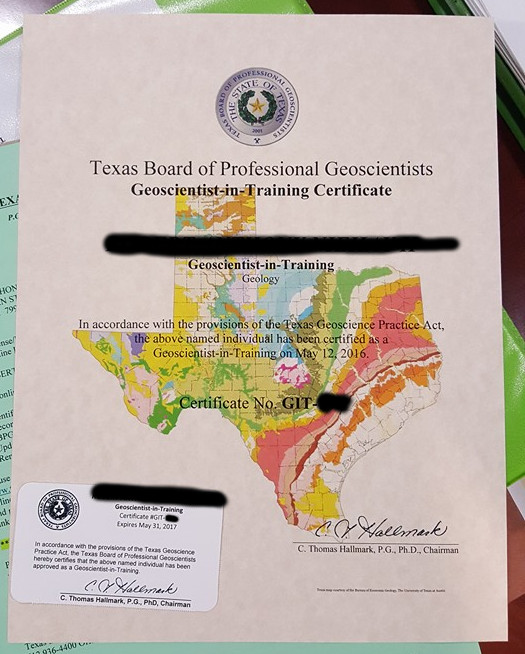
Example of a GIT Certification

Geoscientist in Training, or GIT is a professional designation from the National Association of State Boards of Geology (ASBOG) and other organizations, used in U.S. States which regulate the practice of Geology and related earth science fields.

Requirements for GIT certification are generally as follows:

- Completion of an accredited four year degree program with a minimum of 30 hours of geoscience coursework.
- Passing scores on the ASBOG Fundamentals of Geology exam, CSSE Fundamentals of Soil Science exam, or State Geophysics exam.
- References attesting to the applicant's ethical character.

Actual requirements may vary state to state, and upon completion a Geoscientist in Training (GIT) may be required to complete annual continuing education hours, as well as follow rules associated with their particular state board. Receiving a GIT designation is one step along the path towards a Professional Geologist (PG) licensure.

The Geoscientist in Training (GIT) certification and advancement to Professional Geologist (PG) is similar in structure to the Engineer in Training process.
