= Getter (name) =

Female given name

- Gender: Female
- Language: Estonian

Origin
- Region of origin: Estonia

Getter is an Estonian feminine given name and may refer to:

- Getter Jaani (born 1993), Estonian singer
- Getter Laar (born 1989), Estonian footballer
- Getter Saar (badminton) (born 1992), Estonian badminton player
- Getter Saar (born 1999), Estonian footballer
