= Get (animal) =

Offspring of an animal

The get of an animal are the offspring of a particular individual male animal. It is derived from the term "beget", meaning to father offspring. The term is frequently used in livestock raising and informal animal husbandry, notably horse breeding to describe the offspring of a stallion or sire. In show competition, a "get of sire" class evaluates a group of animals who have the same sire and evaluates the consistency with which a given sire is able to pass on desirable characteristics to his offspring.

== See also ==
- Animal breeding
- Horse breeding
- Selective breeding
