= List of comic books on CD/DVD =

This list will include all comic books that have been or will be released on CD-ROM or DVD-ROM, as well as what books are included in each release. The majority of these releases have been produced or co-produced by Graphic Imaging Technology (GIT), with most of those releases containing Marvel comic books. In addition to these "authorized" editions there are also limitless "unauthorized" publishers offering these titles and many more. Most comic books have already been converted to digital format.

== List ==
Title	Books included	Info	Publisher	Format	Release date
40 Years of the Amazing Spider-Man	Amazing Fantasy #15; The Amazing Spider-Man Vol. 1 #1–441; The Amazing Spider-Man Vol. 2 #1–58; The Amazing Spider-Man Vol. 3 #500	Replaced by The Amazing Spider-Man: The Complete Collection	TOPICS Entertainment/Graphic Imaging Technology	CD-ROM
The Amazing Spider-Man: The Complete Collection	Amazing Fantasy #15; The Amazing Spider-Man Vol. 1 #1–441; The Amazing Spider-Man Vol. 2 #1–58; The Amazing Spider-Man Vol. 3 #500–531; Annual #1–34	Replaces 40 Years of the Amazing Spider-Man	Graphic Imaging Technology	DVD-ROM	2006
The Amazing Spider-Man: The Last 20 Years	The Amazing Spider-Man Vol. 1 #284–441; The Amazing Spider-Man Vol. 2 #1–58; The Amazing Spider-Man Vol. 3 #500–531; Annual #21–34		Graphic Imaging Technology	DVD-ROM	2006
Archie: Bronze Age Series	Archie #197–287; Annual #22–26	February 1970 – December 1979 issues	Graphic Imaging Technology	DVD-ROM	2008
The Avengers Comic Book Library	The Avengers Vol. 1 #1–10		TOPICS Entertainment/Graphic Imaging Technology	CD-ROM
40 Years of the Avengers	The Avengers Vol. 1 #1–402, #1½; The Avengers Vol. 2 #1–13; The Avengers Vol. 3 #1–84, 500–503; Annual #1–27; New Avengers #1–12		Graphic Imaging Technology	DVD-ROM	2006
The Avengers – The Old Order Changeth!	The Avengers Vol. 3 #1–84, 500–503; Annual 1998–2001; The New Avengers #1–27	Allegro Music exclusive	Graphic Imaging Technology	DVD-ROM	2007
Betty and Veronica: Bronze Age Series	Archie's Girls, Betty and Veronica #169–290	January 1970 – February 1980 issues	Graphic Imaging Technology	DVD-ROM	2008
Captain America Comic Book Library	Tales of Suspense #59–68		TOPICS Entertainment/Graphic Imaging Technology	CD-ROM
Captain America: The Complete Collection	Tales of Suspense #59–99; Captain America Vol. 1 #100–454; Captain America Vol. 2 #1–13; Captain America Vol. 3 #1–50; Captain America Vol. 4 #1–32; Captain America Vol. 5 #1–25, Annual #1–17		Graphic Imaging Technology	DVD-ROM	2007
Civil War: The Complete Collection	The Amazing Spider-Man #529–538; The New Avengers #21–27; New Avengers Illuminati #1; Avengers: Initiative #1–7; Battle Damage Report; Black Panther #18–30; Cable & Deadpool #30–32; Captain America #22–31; Casualties of War: Blade #5; Casualties of War: Moon Knight #7, 8; Casualties of War: Wolverine #48; Casualties of War: Winter Soldier #1; Civil War Director's Cut; Civil War #1–7; Civil War: Files; Civil War Captain America & Iron Man; Marvel Spotlight; Opening Shot Sketchbook; Civil War the Confession; Civil War War Crimes; Daredevil #87; Deadpool/GLI Summer Spectacular; Fantastic Four #536–549; Frontline #1–11; Fallen Son #1–5; Ghost Rider #8–11; Heroes for Hire #1–3; Iron Man #13–18; Civil War the Initiative; Mighty Avengers #1–5; Moon Knight #11–13; Ms. Marvel #6–8, 13–17; Marvel Spotlight Aftermath; The New Avengers #28–31; Nova #2, 3; New Warriors #1–5; New X-Men #28; Omega Flight #1–5; The Order #1–4; The Incredible Hulk #100; Punisher War Journal #1–11; She-Hulk #8–9; Sub-Mariner #1–6; Thunderbolts #103–115; Civil War The Return; Wolverine #42–47; X-Factor #8, 9; Civil War: X-Men #1–4; Young Avengers/Runaways #1–4	Diamond Comics exclusive	Graphic Imaging Technology	DVD-ROM	2007
The Complete Maus	Maus Vol. I and II		Voyager	CD-ROM	1994
Daredevil Comic Book Library	Daredevil Vol. 1 #1–10		TOPICS Entertainment/Graphic Imaging Technology	CD-ROM
Deadworld Complete Comic Book Collection	Deadworld Vol. 1 #1–26, Deadworld Vol. 2 #1–15, To Kill a King #1–3, King Zombie #1–2, Christmas in Louisiana, Guns for Sale, The Doom Patrol, The City		Eagle One Media	CD-ROM
Fantastic Four Comic Book Library	Fantastic Four Vol. 1 #1–10		TOPICS Entertainment/Graphic Imaging Technology	CD-ROM
44 Years of Fantastic Four	Fantastic Four Vol. 1 #1–416; Fantastic Four Vol. 2 #1–13; Fantastic Four Vol. 3 #1/2, 1–70, 500–519; Annual #1–32	Replaced by Fantastic Four/Silver Surfer: The Complete Collection	Graphic Imaging Technology	DVD-ROM	2005
Fantastic Four/Silver Surfer: The Complete Collection	Fantastic Four Vol. 1 #1–416, 500–543; Fantastic Four Vol. 2 #1–13; Fantastic Four Vol. 3 #1/2, 1–70; Annual #1–32; Uncanny X-Men & Fantastic Four Annual 1998; Silver Surfer Vol. 1 #1–18; Silver Surfer Vol. 2 #1 (1982 Special Edition); Silver Surfer Vol. 3 (1987) #-1, 1–146; Silver Surfer Vol. 4 (2003) #1–14; Annual #1–9	Replaces 44 Years of Fantastic Four	Graphic Imaging Technology	DVD-ROM	2007
Fantastic Four – A House Divided	Fantastic Four Vol. 3 #1–70, 500–543; Annual 1998–2001	Allegro Music exclusive	Graphic Imaging Technology	DVD-ROM
Fred Perry's Gold Digger GD-rom			Antarctic Press	DVD-ROM
Ghost Rider: The Complete Collection	Marvel Spotlight #5–12; Ghost Rider Vol. 1 #1–81; Ghost Rider Vol. 2 #-1, 1–94; Annual #1, 2; Ghost Rider Vol. 3 #1–6; Ghost Rider Vol. 4 #1–6; Ghost Rider Vol. 5 #1–4		Graphic Imaging Technology	DVD-ROM	2007
Ghost Rider – Blaze Of Glory	Ghost Rider Vol. 2 #1–94; Annual #1, 2; Ghost Rider Vol. 3 #1–6; Ghost Rider Vol. 4 #1–6; Ghost Rider Vol. 5 #1–4	Allegro Music exclusive	Graphic Imaging Technology	DVD-ROM
House of M: The Complete Collection	Excalibur #12–14; House of M Sketchbook; House of M #1–8 + #1 Director's Cut; House of M: Spider-Man #1–5; House of M: Iron Man #1–3; House of M: Fantastic Four #1–3; The Incredible Hulk #83–86; The Uncanny X-Men #462–465; Mutopia X #1–4; Cable & Deadpool #17; Secrets of The House of M; New X-Men #16–19; The Pulse of House of M Special; The Pulse #10; The New Thunderbolts #11; Black Panther #7; Captain America #10; Exiles #69–71; Wolverine #33–36	Diamond Comics exclusive	Graphic Imaging Technology	DVD-ROM	2007
The Incredible Hulk Comic Book Library	Hulk #1–6, Tales to Astonish #60–63		TOPICS Entertainment/Graphic Imaging Technology	CD-ROM
The Incredible Hulk: The Complete Collection	Hulk #1–6; Tales to Astonish #60–101; The Incredible Hulk Vol. 1 #-1, 102–474; The Incredible Hulk Vol. 2 #1–99; Annual #1–25		Graphic Imaging Technology	DVD-ROM	2007
The Incredible Hulk – King Of The World	The Incredible Hulk Vol. 2 #1–99; Annual 1999–2001	Allegro Music exclusive	Graphic Imaging Technology	DVD-ROM
Hulk: DVD Digital Comic Book Archives 1	Incredible Hulk #1–6; Tales to Astonish #59–101; Bonus Material (currently unspecified)	1st 50 issues of an ongoing collection from Marvel	Marvel Comics	DVD-ROM	September 2008
Iron Man Comic Book Library	Tales of Suspense #39–48		TOPICS Entertainment/Graphic Imaging Technology	CD-ROM
The Invincible Iron Man: The Complete Collection	Tales of Suspense #39–99; Iron Man Vol. 1 #1–332; Iron Man Vol. 2 #1–13; Iron Man Vol. 3 #1–89; Iron Man Vol. 4 #1–12; Annual #1–19		Graphic Imaging Technology	DVD-ROM	2007
Iron Man: DVD Digital Comic Book Archives 1	Tales of Suspense #39–88; Tales to Astonish #82; Bonus Material (currently unspecified)	1st 50 issues of an ongoing collection from Marvel	Marvel Comics	DVD-ROM	September 2008
Jughead: Bronze Age Series	Jughead #176–295	January 1970 – December 1979 issues	Graphic Imaging Technology	DVD-ROM	2008
Classic Looney Tunes Comics Vol. 1	Looney Tunes (Gold Key series) #1–20		Graphic Imaging Technology	CD-ROM
Totally Mad	Mad #1–376, plus over 100 Mad Specials including most of the recorded audio inserts	Replaced by Absolutely Mad	Broderbund Software	CD-ROM
Absolutely Mad	Mad #1–460, Mad Classics #1–3, Mad Color Classics #1–11, Mad Follies #1–7, Mad Super Special #1–141, Mad XL #1–34, More Trash From Mad #1–12, Worst From Mad #1–12, Mad Batman Spectacular, Mad Disco, Mad Pop-Off Video, Mad Star Trek Spectacular, Mad Star Wars Spectacular 1996 & 1999, Mad TV, Mad 84	Replaces Totally Mad	Graphic Imaging Technology	DVD-ROM	2006
National Lampoon	A total of 246 original magazines from 1970 through 1998.		Graphic Imaging Technology	DVD-ROM	2007
Marvel Comic Book Library Vol. 1	Giant-Size X-Men #1, X-Men #94–102, Amazing Fantasy #15, The Amazing Spider-Man Vol. 1 #1–9, Daredevil Vol. 1 #1–10, Hulk #1–6, Tales to Astonish #60–63, Fantastic Four Vol. 1 #1–10, Tales of Suspense #59–68, The Avengers Vol. 1 #1–10, Tales to Astonish #70–79, Tales of Suspense #39–48, Silver Surfer Vol. 1 #1–10		Graphic Imaging Technology	CD-ROM
Rod Espinosa Masterworks Collection			Antarctic Press	DVD-ROM
Scooby-Doo! Classic Comics Vol. 1	Scooby Doo (Gold Key series) #1–20		Graphic Imaging Technology	CD-ROM
Spider-Man Comic Book Library	Amazing Fantasy #15, The Amazing Spider-Man Vol. 1 #1–9		TOPICS Entertainment/Graphic Imaging Technology	CD-ROM
Spider-Man – Unmasked	The Amazing Spider-Man Vol. 1 #430–441; The Amazing Spider-Man Vol. 2 #1–58, The Amazing Spider-Man Vol. 3 #500–539; Annual 1998–2001	Allegro Music exclusive	Graphic Imaging Technology	DVD-ROM
Star Trek – The Complete Collection	Gold Key/Western Comics: Star Trek #1–61, Star Trek – Enterprise Logs Vol. #1–4, Star Trek – Dynabrite #11357 and #11358, Star Trek – Dan Curtis Give-Away #2 and 6 Peter Pan/Power Records: Star Trek comic/record sets – Passage to Moauv, The Crier in Emptiness, Dinosaur Planet, The Robot Masters, A Mirror for Futility, The Time Stealer; DC Comics: Star Trek Vol. 1 #1–56 (issue #6 has 2 covers), Annual #1–3, Who's Who in Star Trek #1–2, Star Trek III: The Search for Spock, Star Trek IV: The Voyage Home, Star Trek Vol. 2 #1–80, Annual #1–6, Star Trek V: The Final Frontier, Star Trek VI: The Undiscovered Country (2 covers), Star Trek – The Ashes of Eden, Star Trek Special #1–3, Star Trek – The Modala Imperative #1–4, Star Trek – Debt of Honor (2 covers), Star Trek: The Next Generation Vol. 1 #1–6, Vol. 2 #1–80, Annual #1–6, Star Trek: The Next Generation – The Series Finale: All Good Things, Star Trek: Generations (2 covers), Star Trek: The Next Generation Special #1–3, Star Trek: The Next Generation – The Modala Imperative #1–4, Star Trek: The Next Generation – Ill Wind #1–4, Star Trek: The Next Generation – Shadowheart #1–4; DC Comics and Malibu Comics: Star Trek: The Next Generation/Deep Space Nine Ashcan Edition, Star Trek: The Next Generation/Deep Space Nine, Star Trek: The Next Generation/Deep Space Nine #1–4; Malibu Comics: Star Trek: Deep Space Nine – Edition Preview Ashcan #1A and #1B, Star Trek: Deep Space Nine #1–32 (4 covers for issue #1), Star Trek: Deep Space Nine – Terok Nor Special #0, Star Trek: Deep Space Nine – Worf Special #0, Star Trek: Deep Space Nine Special #1, Star Trek: Deep Space Nine – The Looking Glass War Annual #1, Star Trek: Deep Space Nine – Ultimate Annual #1, Star Trek: Deep Space Nine – Hearts and Minds #1–4 (issue #1–2 covers), Star Trek: Deep Space Nine – Lightstorm Special #1, Star Trek: Deep Space Nine – The Maquis, Soldier of Peace #1–3, Star Trek: Deep Space Nine – Celebrity Series: Blood & Honor, Star Trek: Deep Space Nine – Celebrity Series: The Rules of Acquisition Oplomacy; Marvel Comics: Star Trek #1–18, Marvel Super Special #157 – Star Trek: The Motion Picture, The Full-Color Comics Version of Star Trek: The Motion Picture, Star Trek: The Further Adventures of the Starship Enterprise, Star Trek: Collector's Preview #1–2, Star Trek: Early Voyages #1–17, Star Trek Unlimited #1–10, Star Trek: Deep Space Nine #1–15, Star Trek: Voyager #1–15, Star Trek: Voyager – Splashdown #1–4; Star Trek: Starfleet Academy #1–19 (issue #18 printed in English and Klingon Language Editions), Star Trek: Telepathy War #1–5, Star Trek: Telepathy War – Reality's End Special, Star Trek: Untold Voyages #1–5, Star Trek: First Contact (2 covers), Star Trek: Mirror Mirror, Star Trek: Operation Assimilation, Riker Special: The Enemy of My Enemy; WildStorm Comics: Star Trek – All of Me, Star Trek – Enter the Wolves, Star Trek: The Next Generation – Perchance to Dream #1–4, Star Trek: The Next Generation – Embrace the Wolf, Star Trek: The Next Generation – The Killing Shadows #1–4, Star Trek: The Next Generation – The Gorn Crisis, Star Trek: The Next Generation – Forgiveness, Star Trek: The Next Generation / Deep Space Nine – Divided We Fall #1–4, Star Trek: Deep Space Nine – N-Vector #1–4, Star Trek: Voyager – False Colors (2 covers), Star Trek: Voyager – Elite Force, Star Trek: Voyager – Elite Force Special Collector's Edition, Star Trek: Voyager – Avalon Rising, Star Trek: Voyager – Planet Killer #1–3, Star Trek: New Frontier – Double Time, Star Trek: Special #1		Graphic Imaging Technology	DVD-ROM	September 2008
Star Trek Movie Comic Book Collection	Star Trek (Marvel Comics series) #1–18, Star Trek: The Motion Picture, Star Trek III: The Search for Spock, Star Trek IV: The Voyage Home, Star Trek V: The Final Frontier, Star Trek VI: The Undiscovered Country, Star Trek: Generations, Star Trek: First Contact, Star Trek: The Next Generation Series Finale	Theatre promotion	Graphic Imaging Technology	CD-ROM	2009
Classic Transformers Digital Comic Books	Transformers #1, 2, 4–8, 10–21, 24–29	Theatre promotion	Graphic Imaging Technology	CD-ROM	2009
Ultimate Fantastic Four Complete Comic Book Collection	Ultimate Fantastic Four #1–23, Annual #1	Included with Fantastic Four limited edition DVD	Graphic Imaging Technology	CD-ROM
Ultimate X-Men Complete Comic Book Collection	Ultimate X-Men #1–69, Annual #1		Graphic Imaging Technology	CD-ROM	2006
X-Men Comic Book Library	Giant-Size X-Men #1, X-Men #94–102		TOPICS Entertainment/Graphic Imaging Technology	CD-ROM
40 Years of X-Men	X-Men #-1, 1–461; Annual #1–25; Giant-Size X-Men #1		Graphic Imaging Technology	DVD-ROM	2005
Uncanny X-Men – Apocalypse Now – Again	The Uncanny X-Men #363–474; Annual 1999–2001, 2006	Allegro Music exclusive	Graphic Imaging Technology	DVD-ROM
