= GET 27 =

French liquor with mint

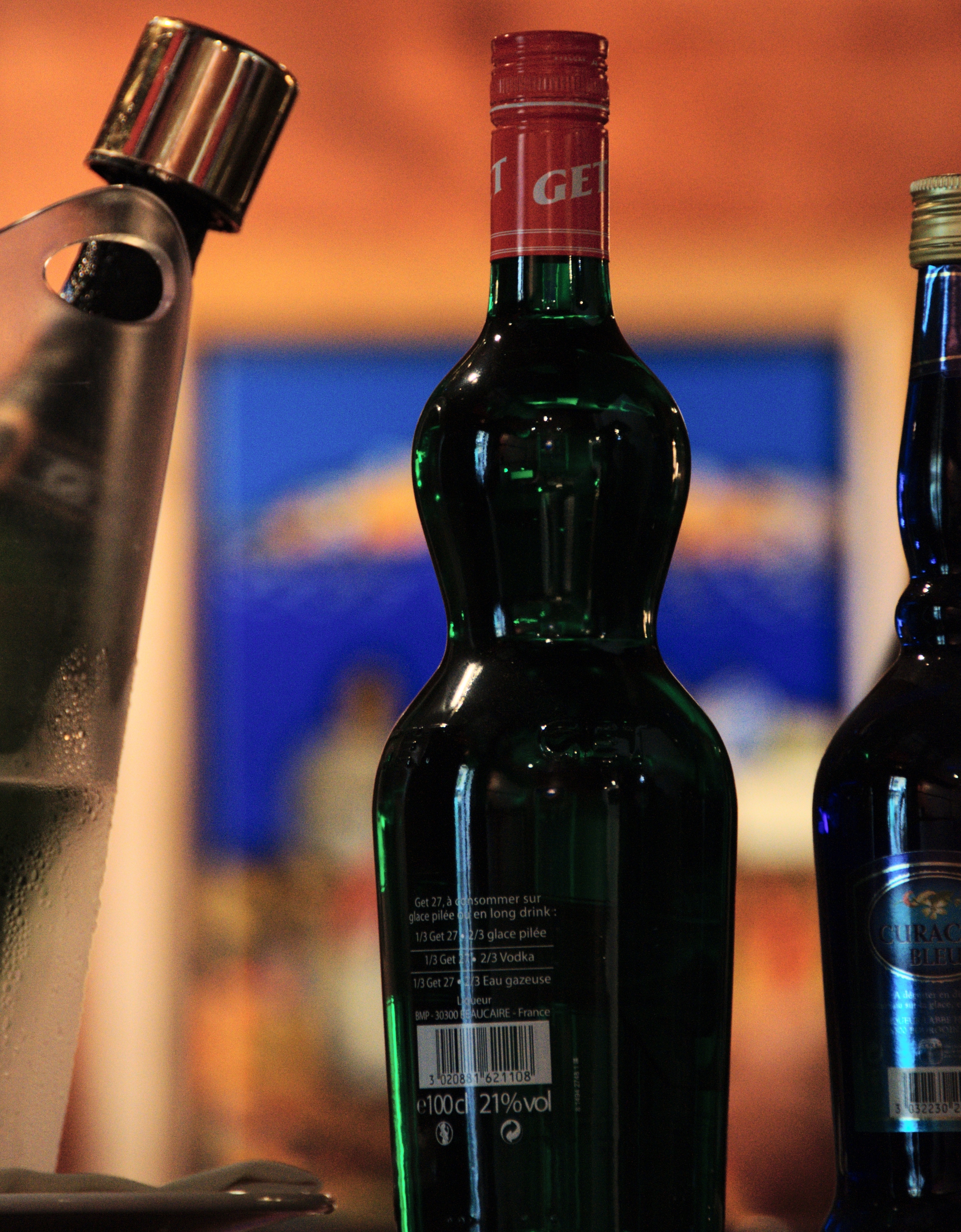
Bottle of GET 27

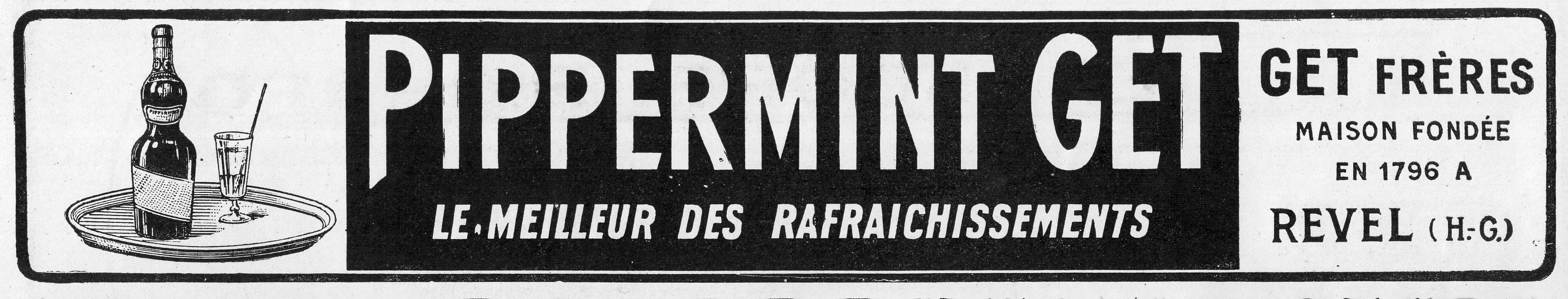
L'Illustration advertisement

GET 27 (/dʒɛt/) is a Crème de menthe Liqueur with mint used as an apéritif or in cocktails. The company was founded in France by Jean and Pierre Get in 1796. Production was in Revel, in the Lauragais area. Trademarked in 1868 as Pippermint GET, the liqueur used peppermint oil imported from England rather than the locally-grown variety. The original distillery remains in use as the town’s cultural centre, but production moved to Gémenos and then to Beaucaire in 1995. The company is now part of Casanis, owned by Bacardi. While its name refers to its original alcohol percentage, it currently has an alcohol content of 21%. Another product of the brand is the GET 31.
