= Li'l Abner (1959 film) =

1959 musical comedy film based on comic strip "Li'l Abner"

- Directed by: Melvin Frank
- Written by: Al Capp; Norman Panama; Melvin Frank
- Produced by: Norman Panama
- Starring: Peter Palmer; Leslie Parrish; Stubby Kaye; Howard St. John; Julie Newmar; Stella Stevens
- Cinematography: Daniel L. Fapp
- Edited by: Arthur P. Schmidt
- Music by: Gene De Paul; Joseph J. Lilley; Nelson Riddle
- Distributed by: Paramount Pictures
- Release date: December 11, 1959
- Running time: 114 minutes
- Language: English
- Box office: $3,200,000 (US/ Canada)

Li'l Abner is a 1959 musical comedy film based on the comic strip of the same name created by Al Capp and the successful Broadway musical of the same name that opened in 1956. The film was produced by Norman Panama and directed by Melvin Frank (co-writers of the Broadway production). It was the second film to be based on the comic strip, the first being RKO's 1940 film, Li'l Abner.

== Plot ==
It's a "typical day" in Dogpatch, U. S. A., a hillbilly town where Abner Yokum lives with his parents. Mammy Yokum insists on giving Abner his daily dose of "Yokumberry tonic", although he is fully-grown. He has a crush on Daisy Mae Scragg (although he resists marrying her) and she on him; Abner's rival for her affections is the World's Dirtiest Rassler, Earthquake McGoon.

Sadie Hawkins Day is approaching. On this day the "girls chase the men and marries whomstever [sic] they catches," as Senator Jack S. Phogbound puts it. However, the citizens of Dogpatch find out that their town has been declared the most unnecessary place in the country—and will be the target of an atom bomb, since the nuclear testing site near Las Vegas is allegedly spoiling things for the wealthy gamblers there.

Dogpatch citizens decide to move at first but later rethink their decision following Mammy Yokum's revelation of societal pressures, which include the necessity of bathing regularly and having an occupation. Trying to avoid the annihilation of Dogpatch, the inhabitants try to prove that Dogpatch has special significance, although the proposal is rejected by government scientist Dr. Rasmussen T. Finsdale. Mammy introduces the invention of "Yokumberry Tonic," which gives Abner his muscular strength. As there is only one known Yokumberry tree planted in the yard of the Yokums, Dogpatch tries to be recognized as unique.

Meanwhile, a greedy business magnate named General Bullmoose covets the tonic as well, since he could market it (as "Yoka-Cola," he tells Abner) and uses his wiles to get the tonic dishonestly. This involves Appassionata von Climax, the general's mistress. He cooks up a scheme to get Ms. von Climax to marry Li'l Abner, after which Abner would be killed and von Climax would become owner of the tonic, "by community property", and turn it over to Bullmoose.

He orders von Climax to enter the race on Sadie Hawkins Day. She catches Li'l Abner (with help from Evil Eye Fleegle) and Daisy Mae ends up heartbroken. But then Daisy, Mammy, Pappy and Marryin' Sam discover (through Mammy's "Conjurin' Power") what General Bullmoose is up to; Daisy promises to marry McGoon if he helps them to save Abner's life. McGoon agrees and rounds up practically everyone in Dogpatch to go to Washington on the rescue mission.

McGoon and the other Dogpatchers disrupt the society party at which Abner is supposed to drink a toast as a prelude to suffering the whammy—and the whammy-giver, Evil Eye Fleegle, says it won't work unless the subject has drunk liquor. So Bullmoose calls for a champagne toast. Fleegle strikes with his 'Truth Whammy' but McGoon deflects the whammy with a silver platter—and the whammy hits Bullmoose, who confesses his scheme.

Yokumberry Tonic is a failure: although it made the subjects healthy and muscular, they don't care about romance...to their wives' chagrin. (This also explains why Abner has resisted marrying Daisy for so long.) Back at Dogpatch — with the tonic rejected, the bombing is on again — the wedding of McGoon and Daisy Mae is on; Romeo Scragg and his kin are armed to keep Marryin' Sam from stalling. Daisy Mae has a plan of her own—she shows McGoon the rest of her Scragg relatives (including "Priceless and Liceless" Scragg, and the "Bar Harbor Scraggs," who've been "barred from every harbor in the country") and he backs out.

Dr. Finsdale orders the wedding stopped in order to evacuate. Pappy Yokum and some of the other Dogpatchers start to pull down an equestrian statue of Jubilation T. Cornpone (the town's founder) from a tall pedestal, claiming they won't leave without it. A stone tablet falls, and it turns out to carry an inscription ordered by Abraham Lincoln, who has declared the city of Dogpatch a "National Shrine" because of Cornpone's incompetence as a Confederate General. Abner points out "You can't bomb a national shrine" and Finsdale relents, cancelling the bombing and leaving Abner and Daisy free to marry.

== Cast ==
| Actor | Role |
|---|---|
| Peter Palmer | Li'l Abner Yokum |
| Leslie Parrish | Daisy Mae Scragg |
| Stubby Kaye | Marryin' Sam |
| Howard St. John | General Bullmoose |
| Stella Stevens | Appassionata von Climax |
| Julie Newmar | Stupefyin' Jones |
| Billie Hayes | Mammy Yokum |
| Joe E. Marks | Pappy Yokum |
| Bern Hoffman | Earthquake McGoon |
| Al Nesor | Evil Eye Fleagle |
| Robert Strauss | Romeo Scragg |
| William Lanteau | Available Jones |
| Ted Thurston | Senator Jack S. Phogbound |
| Carmen Alvarez | Moonbeam McSwine |
| Alan Carney | Mayor Dawgmeat |
| Stanley Simmonds | Dr. Rasmussen T. Finsdale |
| Diki Lerner | Lonesome Polecat |
| Joe Ploski | Hairless Joe |
| Babette Bain | Louella |
| Jerry Lewis | Itchy McRabbit |
| Donna Douglas | Lovelie |
| Lesley-Marie Colburn | Young Dogpatch Girl |
| Valerie Harper | Luke's Wife |
| Beth Howland | Clem's Wife |
| Brad Harris | Muscleman Luke |
| Gordon Mitchell | Muscleman Rufe |

== Production ==
=== Casting ===
Almost every major character in the movie was portrayed by the same performer who appeared in the role on Broadway. Significant exceptions are Daisy Mae (played by Edie Adams on Broadway), Appassionata von Climax (played on stage by Tina Louise) and Mammy Yokum (played on stage by Charlotte Rae). (Note: Billie Hayes, who plays Mammy Yokum in this film, appeared in the Broadway production as a replacement for Charlotte Rae in the role; Hayes also reprised the role in a 1971 TV production of Li'l Abner.) Jerry Lewis appears in a brief cameo as Itchy McRabbit.

=== Music ===
Several songs, with music by Gene De Paul and lyrics by Johnny Mercer, were adapted directly from the Broadway production, but the original portions of the motion picture score were written and conducted by Nelson Riddle and Joseph J. Lilley, which earned them an Oscar nomination for Best Score in 1960 and earned Riddle a Grammy nomination for Best Soundtrack Album.

== Release ==
The movie was released on December 11, 1959 by Paramount Pictures.

== Reception ==
Bosley Crowther of The New York Times wrote, "Unless you are thoroughly allergic to bad grammar and cartoon repartee, you should have a good time at Li'l Abner, especially if you're a kid." Variety stated, "The musical is lively, colorful and tuneful, done with smart showmanship in every department." John L. Scott of the Los Angeles Times described the film as "delightful nonsense" with dance numbers that "are explosions of energy that set one's feet to twitching." Harrison's Reports wrote that the film "slows down appreciably when it dips into complicated plot," but "the tunes by Johnny Mercer are sprightly if not memorable and the dances staged by Dee Dee Wood are pure delight." Richard L. Coe of The Washington Post declared, "Li'l Abner is broad, colorful fun and I should think even Al Capp would be pleased with it." The Monthly Film Bulletin said, "The dancing is fresh and energetic but, like the whole film, is unhappily served by the flat, hamfisted direction. Panama and Frank attempt no more than a straight VistaVision record of their Broadway musical, and show a complete indifference to the possibilities of staging such an attractive number as 'If I Had My Druthers.'" John McCarten of The New Yorker wrote, "On Broadway the show was primitive; in the movies it is Neanderthal."

== Home media ==
The film was released on DVD on April 19, 2005, by Paramount Home Entertainment.

== See also ==
- List of American films of 1959
- Lower Slobbovia
- Abbie an' Slats
- Li'l Abner (musical)
- Salomey
