= Long Sam =

American comic strip by Al Capp

Bob Lubbers' Long Sam (1954)

Long Sam is an American comic strip created by Al Capp, writer-artist of Li'l Abner, and illustrated by Bob Lubbers. It was syndicated by United Feature Syndicate from May 31, 1954, to December 29, 1962. The strip was initially written by Capp, who soon turned the duties over to his brother, Elliot Caplin. Lubbers eventually assumed the writing duties himself in the strip's last few years.

== Characters and story ==
Long Sam was, like Li'l Abner, a hillbilly strip, though based on a female character. The title character, Sam, was a tall, voluptuous, naive mountain girl who had been raised in a hidden valley away from civilization by her Maw, who hates men and wishes to protect her daughter from them. Comics historian Don Markstein detailed the situations and characters:

Accounts differ as to exactly when United Feature began syndicating Long Sam. The best information indicates it was Monday, May 31, 1954, but other sources say it was Sunday, June 6, or Monday, June 7, of that year. Sam was similar to an earlier Capp character, Cynthia Hound-Baskerville, a.k.a. Strange Gal, who had emerged from the Great Swamp near Abner's Dogpatch to participate in the 1938 Sadie Hawkins Day race. Like Strange Gal, Long Sam was raised in isolation, by a man-hating Maw; and like Strange Gal, Long Sam was irrevocably changed when she did come into contact with civilization. The first story concerned the outside world's discovery of the remote, uncharted valley where Sam and Maw lived; and consequently, Sam's discovery of the outside world, which Maw had assured her did not exist. Maw's strategy immediately backfired—instead of protecting Sam from the wiles of men, her lack of experience had rendered her exceptionally vulnerable to their charms. Throughout the strip's run, Sam would alternate between visits with Maw in her valley, and excursions outside; and a recurring schtick was that when outside, Sam would usually fall in love with the first man she met.

The strip is considered an example of good girl art, and Lubbers was chosen as the artist for his facility with attractive females in the syndicated Tarzan strip. In 1956, Long Sam featured the lyrics to a song, "Lonesome and Disgusted", which had a promotional tie-in when Coral Records issued a recording of the song by Capp and Lubbers with music by Dave Lambert. The vocalist on the recording was the comedian and voice actor Leo De Lyon.
