= Li'l Abner (1940 film) =

1940 film directed by Albert S. Rogell

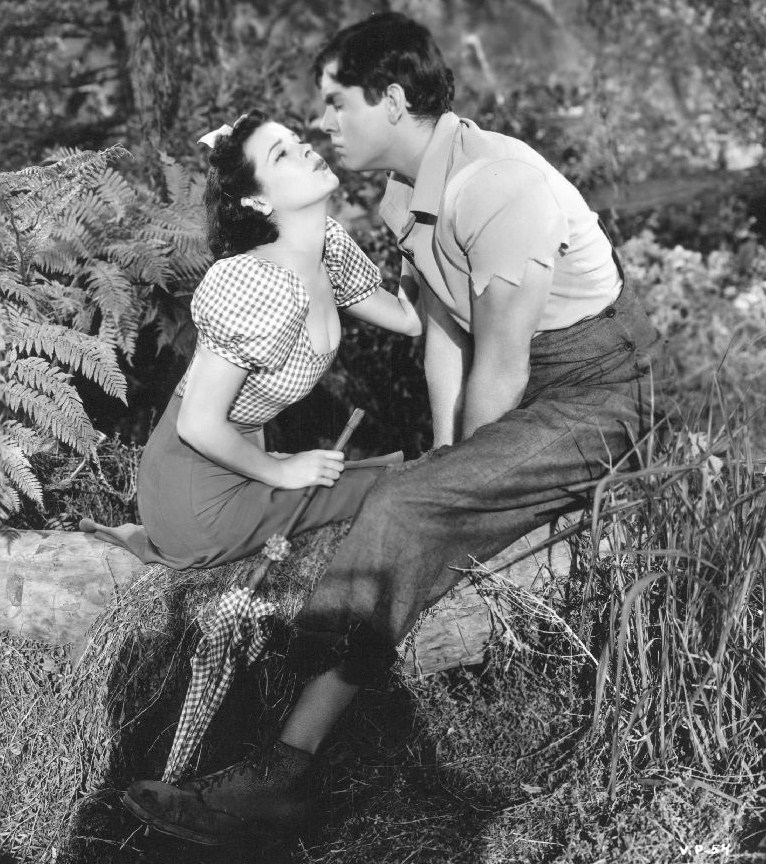
- Still with Billie Seward and Jeff York
- Directed by: Albert S. Rogell
- Screenplay by: Charles Kerr; Tyler Johnson
- Based on: Li'l Abner by Al Capp
- Produced by: Lou L. Ostrow
- Starring: Jeff York; Martha O'Driscoll; Mona Ray; Johnnie Morris; Buster Keaton
- Cinematography: Harry Jackson
- Edited by: Otto Ludwig; Donn Hayes
- Music by: Lud Gluskin
- Production companies: Vogue Pictures, Ltd.
- Distributed by: RKO Radio Pictures reissued by Astor Pictures
- Release date: November 1, 1940
- Running time: 78 minutes
- Language: English

Li'l Abner (1940 film) by Albert S. Rogell

Li'l Abner is a 1940 comedy film based on the comic strip Li'l Abner created by Al Capp. The three most recognizable names associated with the film are Buster Keaton as Lonesome Polecat, Jeff York as Li'l Abner, and Milton Berle, who co-wrote the title song.

This was the first of two films based on the popular Al Capp strip, the second being Paramount's 1959 musical, Li'l Abner, which was also based on the hit 1956 Broadway musical Li'l Abner.

The film was poorly received, with the rubber "facial appliances" worn by some of the characters to simulate Capp's character designs being especially deficient.

== Plot ==
Li'l Abner becomes convinced that he is going to die within twenty-four hours, so he agrees to marry two different girls: Daisy Mae (who has chased him for years) and Wendy Wilecat (who rescued him from an angry mob). It is all settled at the Sadie Hawkins Day race.

== Cast ==
Role	Actor
Li'l Abner Yokum	Jeff York (as Granville Owen)
Daisy Mae Scraggs	Martha O'Driscoll
Pansy "Mammy" Yokum	Mona Ray
Lucifer "Pappy" Yokum	Johnnie Morris
Lonesome Polecat	Buster Keaton
Cousin Delightful	Billie Seward
Wendy Wilecat	Kay Sutton
Granny Scraggs	Maude Eburne
Hairless Jo'	Bud Jamison
Cornelius Cornpone	Edgar Kennedy
Montague	Johnny Arthur
Barber	Walter Catlett
The Sheriff / Mr. Oldtimer	Lucien Littlefield
Earthquake McGoon	Charles A. Post
Hairless Joe	Bud Jamison
Mayor Gurgle	Chester Conklin
Marryin' Sam	Dick Elliott
Cicero Grunts	Mickey Daniels
Hannibal Hoops	Doodles Weaver
Miss Lulubell	Marie Blake
Sarah Jones	Rene Riano
Joe Smithpan	Al St. John
Barney Bargrease	Eddie Gribbon
Bachelor, Sadie Hawkins Day Race	Hank Mann
Bachelor	Eddie Borden
Fantastic Brown	Victor Potel
Undetermined Role	Louise Keaton

== In popular culture ==
The film was featured in the 2004 romance film, The Notebook. Noah and Allie go see the film at the American Theater in Charleston, South Carolina.

== See also ==
- Dogpatch
- List of romantic comedy films
