= Bern Hoffman =

American film, television and theatre actor

- Publicity photo of Bern Hoffman
- Born: Benjamin Bernard Hoffman; February 17, 1913; Maryland, U.S.
- Died: December 15, 1979 (aged 66); Sherman Oaks, California, U.S.
- Education: Johns Hopkins University
- Occupation: Actor
- Years active: 1937–1976
- Spouse: Diana Hoffman
- Children: 2

Benjamin Bernard Hoffman (February 17, 1913 – December 15, 1979) was an American film, television and theatre actor. He was best known for playing Earthquake McGoon in Li'l Abner, both in the Broadway play and in the 1959 film.

== Life and career ==
Hoffman was born in Maryland, the son of Rose Hoffman. He had a brother and a sister. He attended Johns Hopkins University, where he studied medicine, and also attended Loyola College, studying explosives engineering. He dropped out of college to support his family.

Hoffman began his screen career in 1937, appearing in two films, Meet the Missus and Forty Naughty Girls, playing the uncredited role of an orchestra leader in both films. He made his theatre debut in 1944, appearing in the Broadway play Catherine Was Great. He also played Joey Biltmore in Guys and Dolls, during its first production. He later played Pawnee Bill in the Broadway play Annie Get Your Gun.

Hoffman later moved to North Hollywood, California with his family. He played Earthquake McGoon in the film version of the Broadway play Li'l Abner. His film and television credits included On The Town, Tombstone Territory, The Man Who Understood Women, Bonanza, Ironside, Death Valley Days, The Phil Silvers Show, Somebody Up There Likes Me, Rawhide, The Outfit and The Streets of San Francisco.

== Death ==
Hoffman died on December 15, 1979 at the Sherman Oaks Hospital in Sherman Oaks, California, at the age of 66. He was buried at Mount Sinai Memorial Park Cemetery.
