= Fearless Fosdick =

American comic strip character

Al Capp's Fearless Fosdick is featured in a Li'l Abner Sunday sequence from April 3, 1960.

Fearless Fosdick is a long-running parody of Chester Gould's Dick Tracy. It appeared intermittently as a strip-within-a-strip in Al Capp's satirical hillbilly comic strip, Li'l Abner (1934–1977).

== Li'l Abner's "ideel" ==
Fearless Fosdick made his debut in an August 1942 Li'l Abner Sunday sequence, as the unflappable comic book idol of Abner (and of every other "100% red-blooded American boy!") and an object of undying hero worship. Hayseed Abner mindlessly aped his role model—even going so far as submitting to marriage against his will.

Fearless Fosdick is a parody of all of Dick Tracy's memorable qualities. As described in Dick Tracy and American Culture, "Fosdick's square jaw was even more pronounced than Tracy's, violence was used much more gratuitously in Fosdick than in Tracy (and rarely with any meaning), grotesques were even more outrageous."

Cartoonist Al Capp (1909–1979) would often use Li'l Abner continuity as a narrative framing device, bookending the offbeat Fosdick sequences. Abner himself serves as a rustic Greek chorus—to introduce, comment upon and (sometimes) comically sum up the Fosdick stories. Typically, an anxious Abner would race frantically to the mailbox or to the train delivering the morning newspapers, to get a glimpse of the latest cliffhanger episode. The next panel would reveal Abner's POV of the feature under an iconic logo: Fearless Fosdick by Lester Gooch. Subsequent installments would reinforce Abner's obsessive immersion in the unfolding Fosdick continuity while at the same time recapping the story within a story. While oblivious to the surrounding "real" world (e.g., walking off a cliff or into the path of an oncoming train, or inadvertently ignoring one of Daisy Mae's perilous predicaments), Abner would be, as ever, fully engrossed in the Fosdick adventure. Eventually, Capp would dispense with Abner's introductory panels altogether, and the strip would carry a subheading reminding readers they were now reading Li'l Abner's "ideel," Fearless Fosdick.

Occasionally Fosdick's adventures would directly affect what happened to Abner, and the two storylines would artfully converge. The story-within-a-story often ironically paralleled and/or parodied the story itself. Also, by having the comically obtuse Abner "explain" the strip to Daisy Mae, Capp would use Fearless Fosdick to self-reflexively comment upon his own strip, his readers, and the nature of comic strips and "fandom" in general, resulting in an absurd but overall structurally complex and layered satire.

"Capp's Fearless Fosdick sequences proved over the years to be some of his most popular," according to M. Thomas Inge. "Fearless Fosdick remains the only comic strip-within-a-comic strip to achieve its own following."

== Setting and themes ==
Fearless Fosdick is set in an unnamed, crime-infested American metropolis similar to Chicago. Its urban setting stands in stark contrast with Li'l Abner's rural Dogpatch. Fosdick lives in squalor at the dilapidated boarding house run by his dour, pitiless landlady, Mrs. Flintnose. He never married his own long-suffering fiancée Prudence (ugh!) Pimpleton, but Fosdick was directly responsible for one of the seminal events of the strip—the famous marriage of his biggest fan, Li'l Abner, to Daisy Mae in 1952.

As the only grownup member of the local Fearless Fosdick kiddie fan club, Abner had unwittingly vowed to do everything Fosdick does, not realizing that Fosdick's comic strip marriage was only a dream and despite having previously told Daisy Mae that cartoonists often employ plot contrivances like dream sequences and impending weddings as sucker bait, to fool their gullible readers.

In addition to being fearless, Fosdick is "pure, underpaid and purposeful," according to his creator. "Fearless is without doubt the world's most idiotic detective. He shoots people for their own good, is pure beyond imagining, and is fanatically loyal to a police department which exploits, starves and periodically fires him," Capp told Pageant magazine in May 1952. Although Fosdick is the hero of all red-blooded American boys, Daisy Mae detests him with venomous passion. All throughout Li'l Abner, the neglected Daisy Mae finds herself in the ironic position of being jealous of a "stoopid comical strip character!" When Capp was asked (in a Playboy interview conducted by Alvin Toffler in 1965) about the specific gender makeup of his readers, he responded by using Fosdick as an example of the (perceived) inherent differences between the male and female sense of humor:

Whether most of the readers are male or female depends on when the survey is taken ... During a Fearless Fosdick sequence, I lose 20 million women. They stop reading right away ... Men enjoy Fosdick's bad aim, for example. In order to scare off a guy who's selling balloons without a license, Fosdick will shoot three or four innocent housewives through the head—all in the line of duty, of course. Men enjoy this sort of humor, but housewives don't seem to see anything funny about it!

— Al Capp, Playboy, December 1965, pp. 89–100

Although Fearless Fosdick began as a specific burlesque of Dick Tracy, it eventually grew beyond mere parody and developed its own distinctive, self-contained comic identity. Like all of Capp's creations, Fosdick gradually evolved into a broad, multileveled satire of contemporary American society. Mixing equal parts slapstick, black humor, irony, and biting social criticism, Fearless Fosdick provided a running commentary on, among other things: the lowly lives of policemen, the capriciousness of the general public, and the thankless role of society's "heroes"—as well as the superficiality of modern pop culture and the compulsive nature of its avid fans. Capp would return to these themes again and again in Fearless Fosdick.

== Supporting characters and villains ==
Fearless Fosdick soon developed its own regular supporting cast, separate from Li'l Abner and the rest of the Dogpatch characters. Joining Fosdick's intermittent adventures were:

- The Chief - Fosdick's bloated, abusive and cheerfully corrupt superior. He thinks Fosdick is a fat headed, Moronic, egotistical Yellow Bellied slob
- Prudence (ugh!) Pimpleton - Fosdick's homely, long-suffering fiancée (formerly known as "Bess Backache." Both names were a direct parody of Dick Tracy's sweetheart, Tess Trueheart.) They were perpetually "engaged for 17 years," throughout the entire 35-year run of Fearless Fosdick. Prudence always hoped that Fosdick would get a promotion and a subsequent pay raise of $10.00 to $32.50 per week-so he would have enough salary to support her in marriage-but Prudence was doomed to disappointment. A running gag is Prudence Pimpleton literally kicking Fearless Fosdick out of her house into the street. The nearest Prudence ever came to marriage is with Fosdick in a "dream sequence" nightmare Fosdick had-which ironically led to Li'l Abner Yokum finally marrying Daisy Mae Scragg after nearly 20 years of engagement in 1952. In another episode she was heroine when she saved the earth from destruction by uniting two lovesick machines "Solomon" and "Sheba" although it nearly cost her her life [1960]. Another time Fosdick saved Prudence from unknowingly marrying his evil twin brother, Jerry J. Fosdick, in 1975.
- Mr. and Mrs. Pimpleton - Prudence's frustrated parents, who were miffed about feeding the freeloading Fosdick.
- Mrs. Flintnose - Fosdick's mercenary, hatchet-faced landlady.
- Cousin Sebastian - The Chief's idiot relation, who periodically replaces Fosdick on the police force and is beaten up in place of Fosdick after Fosdick gets fired.
- Purity Pinchwolf - a pretty policewoman of the Anti-Masher Squad (1960); after Fosdick made a vow not to use violence against criminals, his girlfriend Prudence Pimpleton kicked Fosdick out of her house and refused to feed him (as she had been doing for the past 17 years hoping he would marry her). Fosdick whistled about her, which was mistaken for a wolf whistle at Pinchwolf, who bonked Fosdick on the head; Fosdick falls in love with the fact that as the daughter of a supermarket owner she has a reserve supply of steaks. Later Purity had to defend herself against Mayor Smellgood.
- Lester Gooch - Supposedly Fosdick's cartoonist "creator"—a broadly drawn caricature of real-life Dick Tracy creator Chester Gould. The chronically overworked Gooch battles both his venal, exploitative comic strip syndicate and occasional bouts of temporary insanity. His mental lapses necessitate frequent visits to an insane asylum, complete with straitjacket and rubber room—from whence his most demented, diabolical plots would emerge (much to the delight of his rabid fans).

The early strips referred to grotesque Dick Tracy-inspired public enemies with absurdly satirical names like "Banana Face," "Spinach Face" and "Hamburger Face." One villain, "Carrot Top," could not be tracked by bloodhounds, as he had no blood. His head was a genuine carrot. But Fosdick tracks him to his doom—with a rabbit. Over the years, other nemeses included:

- Bomb Face - Criminal gang leader with a cannonball bomb for a head (see excerpt), who tries to kill Fosdick by igniting his own fuse. Fosdick turns the tables on him—literally, causing the detonating Bomb Face to incinerate his own gang. (The original artwork for this Li'l Abner Sunday sequence, dated 30 May 1943, is currently housed at the Library of Congress in the Caroline and Erwin Swann Collection.)
- Stone Face - A supposedly fictional comic strip character who unexpectedly turns out to be "real," threatening and tormenting Fosdick cartoonist Lester Gooch (1943). His solid granite head proves to be no match for Li'l Abner's, however.
- Rattop - A particularly heinous villain, with a mouse head (1944).
- "The Hat" - A headless serial killer who wears a wide-brimmed zoot suit fedora atop his shoulders, concealing his empty collar (1945). He could not be executed, since his homicidal crimes are all hanging offenses. He's finally undone when Fosdick tricks him into crossing state lines—where the method of execution is by electric chair.
- Anyface - A diabolical master of disguise (1947)—albeit with slovenly personal grooming habits. Another time Anyface disguised himself as Bess Backache and tricked Fosdick into "MarryIng" "Bess"! Anyface then showed himself and Fosdick was so humiliated he considered leaving the Police Force. He ended up disguising himself as Fearless Fosdick – and both the real thing and the copy confront one another in a steam bath; this episode ends in an unresolved cliffhanger when a feverish Lester Gooch suddenly becomes "sane," and abandons the storyline – much to Abner's frustration. Capp invited readers to submit their own solutions in a nationwide, promotional mail-in contest. The solution was Anyface showing himself in the Steam bath just as Fosdick comes in; true to form Fosdick saw Anyface/Fosdick go into the steam bath and after an hour realized that if there were two Fosdick one was a phoney. Anyface was later utilized as an all-purpose villain in a series of print ads featuring Fosdick, produced for Wildroot Cream-Oil hair tonic, see Licensing and advertising) One time he disguised himself as Fosdick only to be exposed as Anyface because his hair is not treated with Wildroot Cream-Oil hair tonic. In July 1966 Anyface disguised himself as Daisy Mae in order to get a manuscript of his life from Li'l Abner; although he failed to fool Li'l Abner; Li'l Abner realized who was the real Daisy Mae when she became jealous. Anyface grabbed the manuscript and, jumping a fence, fell into Dogpatch's Bottomless Canyon; Anyface tried to get the folks who live on the side of the canyon to save him by changing into John Wayne, however, as John Wayne always defeated the Indians in the movies-the "natives" refused to save him; in his last desperate chance Anyface changed himself into Lyndon Baines Johnson; however the last inhabitant of "Bottomless Canyon" (A cartoon version of Senator Barry Goldwater) refuses to save Anyface from being doomed to fall forever.
- "Fearful" Fosdick (a.k.a. "The Original") - Fosdick's own dastardly, turncoat father (1948). The senior Fosdick, a former policeman-turned-criminal mastermind, is one of only a handful of recurring Fosdick villains.
- Jerry J. Fosdick - Fosdick's evil twin con-man brother; after he finds out about Prudence Pimpleton's 17-year engagement (+ steak dinners) to Fosdick, Jerry J. Fosdick switches clothing with Fosdick and takes his place so he can "marry" (i.e. steal her money) Prudence Pimpleton; Fosdick "stops" the "wedding" at the last minute! (August 24, 1975)
- The Chippendale Chair - A murderously evil piece of furniture (1948). Fosdick admonishes it, "You're going to get the chair, Chair!" As usual Fosdick does bring the chair to the electric chair--but only after a large body count due to Fosdick's stupidity.
- Elmer Schlmpf - The product-tampering urban terrorist from "The Case of the Poisoned Beans" who is beyond the reach of the law—being already dead (1950).
- The Atom Bum - A vagrant tramp on an escalating crime spree, loaded with radioactive plutonium—and thus deadly if he is so much as jarred. After he is found not to be destructive, he makes the mistake of walking on the grass despite a "Do not walk on the Grass" sign, and is shot dead by Fearless Fosdick (1951).
- Sidney the Crooked Parrot - Fosdick's own mutinous, criminally insane house pet who after Fosdick cut down on his supply of crackers, made up his own criminal gang and nearly succeeded in killing Fosdick--but who ended up as a meal for Fosdick (1953).
- Ezio the Pincher - A petty jewel thief who stashes the "hot" Beanfort Knox wristwatch inside Fosdick's skull—where Fosdick cannot find it, but can hear it ticking (1957). His name was a play on real-life opera star, Ezio Pinza.
- Nelson Shrinkafeller - The mysterious Jívaro Jungle headshrinker (1959). His moniker was a takeoff on then-New York governor (and future vice president) Nelson Rockefeller.
- Ricky Smellgood- a lovesick teenage Mayor for the Day who tries to woo Purity Pinchwolf; when he finds a rival in Fearless Fosdick, he sends Fosdick to enforce an ordinance from Smellgood forbidding the Bullgravians from celebrating a homicidal new year.
- "Solomon" - A lovesick, artificially intelligent weather satellite with the power to turn benign, man-made objects against humanity—unless it can unite with its mate satellite, "Sheba". (1960).
- "E.D.S." - The robotic "Electronic Detective Substitute," which managed to rack up even more collateral damage than Fosdick (1961).
- Frank Nutsy (a.k.a. "The Enforcer") - Mobster boss of "The Unteachables," a parody of both TV's The Untouchables and real-life Al Capone henchman Frank Nitti (1961). Nutsy bribes everyone in Fosdick's hometown of Honesty, Indiana into falsely declaring Fosdick 65 years old—and thus prematurely retired from the force.
- Boldfinger - Disguised as master spy "James Bumm", Fosdick pursues an arch-criminal with a forefinger that can pierce solid steel, and breath as hypnotically sweet as poppy blossoms (1965).
- Babyface - Half-pint killer and racketeer with an incongruously angelic face (1972). Disguised as a child, he passed as an adorable seven-year-old and stole the world's rarest jewel, the "Keeler Ruby."

== The "hole" story ==
Fosdick is so tough that on the rare occasions he isn't wearing his black suit, he pins his badge to his bare chest. The ramped-up comic violence depicted in Fearless Fosdick is (usually) bloodless, over-the-top and deliberately surreal. Perpetually ventilated by flying bullets, an iconic Fosdick trademark was the "Swiss cheese look"—with smoking bullet holes revealing his truly two-dimensional cartoon construction. The impervious detective considers the gaping holes "minor scratches" or "mere flesh wounds" however, and always reports back in one piece for duty the next day. (When the Chief once said, "Fosdick! We thought you were dead!" Fosdick replied, "I was—but it didn't prove fatal. Only a mild case.")

Fosdick's iron-jawed profile adorned both Consolidated B-24 Liberator and Boeing B-17 Flying Fortress bombers during World War II, joining the other Li'l Abner-inspired wartime nose art mascots—Earthquake McGoon, Moonbeam McSwine, Daisy Mae, Lonesome Polecat, Hairless Joe, Silent Yokum, Sadie Hawkins and Wolf Gal.

Supposedly starting as a patrolman in 1923 and finally making detective grade in 1948, Fosdick is perennially underpaid at $22.50 per week. (A running gag in the strip has Fosdick getting rehired after being fired from the force. He has to restart at an apprentice rate, which is half his regular onerous salary).

Fosdick has notoriously bad aim and even worse judgment. Oblivious to more obvious felonies being committed in broad daylight in the background (such as murders, assaults and bank robberies), Fosdick would bypass them to shoot someone who walked on the grass or sold balloons without a license. He regularly shoots dozens of innocent bystanders and apprehends the wrong individuals—while the real criminals go free. A darkly comic running gag in the series is the stoic, stone-faced image of a determined Fosdick standing amidst a still-smoking pile of bullet-riddled pedestrians—the inevitable collateral damage of any Fosdick crimefighting endeavor. "When Fosdick is after a lawbreaker, there is no escape for the miscreant," wrote Capp in the introduction to Al Capp's Fearless Fosdick: His Life and Deaths (1956). "There is, however, a fighting chance to escape for hundreds of innocent bystanders who happen to be in the neighborhood—but only a fighting chance. Fosdick's duty, as he sees it, is not so much to maintain safety as to destroy crime, and it's too much to ask any law-enforcement officer to do both, I suppose."

Gullible, dense and impossibly inept, public servant Fosdick is duty-bound and literal-minded to the point of being a menace to the citizens he is sworn to protect. Typically guileless Fosdick logic occurs in "The Case of the Poisoned Beans" (1950), a quintessential Fearless Fosdick continuity. In the story, the ever-vigilant detective goes about town shooting anyone he sees eating "Old Faithful" brand beans in an attempt to prevent them from consuming a toxic can he knows to have been tampered with. Throughout the story, the absurdity continues to mount—along with the astronomical body count—to its outlandish (and characteristically sardonic) dénouement. Fosdick begins his "crusade" by shooting dead a father who was trying to open a can of chicken soup for his children's dinner; Fosdick's "body count" is over 612, not including his dear old Aunt who made a mistake of trying to open a can of beans in his presence. The body count goes even higher after Fosdick has to turn in his gun--he uses a bow and arrow! Organized Crime takes advantage of Fosdick's stupidly not only by having hitmen give cans of beans to victims (whom Fosdick of course kills) but also opening up "Beaneasies" (a spoof of Speakeasies) where customers can fill themselves up to their heart's content of beans. Ironically, Fosdick ends up being sentenced to die in the electric chair, and for his last meal consumes a can of beans which turns out to be the can he was searching for. As is sometimes common in cartoon strips, Fosdick "dies" but (thanks to Lester Gooch) Fosdick comes back to life to inflict more chaos and mayhem on innocent citizens.

No one is spared Capp's merciless satire in "The Case of the Poisoned Beans"—from the venality of the justice system to the crookedness of a complicit media (which refuses to air public safety warnings for fear of offending its sponsor, Old Faithful Beans); from the corruption of big business to the fickleness and stupidity of a complacent public. The diabolical plot, which concerns urban terrorism and product tampering, presaged the 1982 Tylenol case by more than 30 years. "Capp makes Fosdick's police brutality acceptable, even funny, because Fosdick acts out of misguided goodness. He is, like Abner, an innocent," wrote Max Allan Collins in 1990. He's also a victim of the system himself. According to Capp, "Fosdick is underpaid only in terms of money. His superiors and his community are lavish with things worth more than money, such as hollow praise and chances to risk his life." Capp dedicated a book of reprinted Fosdick continuities to "all underpaid cops, because there are no other kind."

== Chester Gould's reaction ==
Newspaper editors began clamoring for Fosdick to star in his own strip, something Capp briefly considered. Chester Gould, the creator of Dick Tracy, reportedly did not find Capp's parody particularly funny. This is not surprising, since Fearless Fosdick lampoons every aspect of Dick Tracy, all grossly exaggerated for comic effect, from Fosdick's impossibly square-jawed profile to his propensity for creating mayhem beyond all reason. The style of the Fosdick sequences closely mimics Tracy—including the urban setting, the outrageously grotesque villains, the galloping mortality rate, the thick square panels, the crosshatched shadows, and even the lettering style.

Gould was also probably less than enamored of his own unflattering portrayal in the character of Fosdick's "creator," the diminutive and occasionally mentally deranged cartoonist Lester Gooch. (Even Gooch's bogus "autograph" in the panels of Fearless Fosdick is a parody of Gould's own famously flamboyant signature.) Gooch toiled for the abusive and corrupt "Squeezeblood Syndicate," a dig at Capp's own real-life syndicate, United Features, which owned Li'l Abner until Capp successfully wrested back ownership in 1948. Ironically, the post-Gould Dick Tracy's favorite cartoon character was Fearless Fosdick.

Whatever Capp really thought of Dick Tracy, he always went out of his way to praise Gould and his strip in conversation and in print, invariably referring to it as "Chester Gould's magnificent Dick Tracy." In The World of Li'l Abner (1953), Capp even credited Dick Tracy (along with Little Orphan Annie) with directly influencing Abner, prompting his early decision to add suspense to the humorous feature. "The greatest tribute paid to Chester Gould by another famous comic strip artist and storyteller and his creation was, of course, Al Capp's Fearless Fosdick," wrote author and Dick Tracy expert Garyn G. Roberts in 1993. "In short, Fearless Fosdick was a great deal of fun, but must be taken seriously as a loving tribute to Chester Gould and Dick Tracy."

Gould never publicly objected to Fearless Fosdick, or made any attempt to interfere with Capp's continuing the feature during the 35 years in which it appeared. Gould and Capp met only once, according to Capp. It was reportedly a friendly meeting, and Gould took the occasion to thank Capp for doing what he called "full-time press agentry for another comic strip." Capp readily agreed. Max Allan Collins, who took over the helm of Dick Tracy when Gould retired, thoroughly enjoyed Fearless Fosdick and even wrote an appreciative foreword to a 1990 collection of Fosdick cartoons.

Besides Dick Tracy, Capp spoofed many other comic strips in Li'l Abner, including Steve Canyon, Superman (at least twice; first as "Jack Jawbreaker!" in 1947 and again in 1966 as "Chickensouperman!"), Mary Worth, Peanuts, Rex Morgan, M.D., Little Annie Rooney, and Little Orphan Annie. Although they proved fertile sources of parody—most memorably "Little Fanny Gooney" (1952), "Rex Moonlight, M.D." (1956), "Steve Cantor" and "Mary Worm" (1957)—no other strip seemed to provide Capp with the same bottomless well of inspiration as Dick Tracy. Later comic strip parodies were mostly one-shot affairs. They never achieved quite the same degree of repeat success or sustained popularity as Fearless Fosdick.

== Licensing and advertising ==
=== Fearless Fosdick TV show ===
Fearless Fosdick proved popular enough to be incorporated into a short-lived television program in 1952. A puppet show based on Fosdick premiered on NBC-TV on Sunday afternoons, and even made the cover of TV Guide for the week of October 17, 1952. (The TV show also sparked the permanent switch in the strip from Fosdick's early Dick Tracy yellow fedora to his later trademark bowler hat, when Capp felt the three-dimensional puppet looked too close for comfort to the genuine article.)

Created for television and directed by puppeteer Mary Chase, Fearless Fosdick was written by Everett Crosby and voiced by John Griggs, Gilbert Mack, and Jean Carson. The storylines and villains were mostly separate from the comic strip and unique to the show. Thirteen episodes were produced featuring the Mary Chase marionettes. Presumed lost for many years, vintage kinescopes of the show have reportedly begun to resurface. (According to publisher Denis Kitchen: "There are currently efforts underway to release these exceedingly rare Fosdick episodes on a set of DVDs. Stay tuned ...") Two of the half-hour episodes (The Haunted House and Lonely Hearts) are housed at the Library of Congress, in the J. Fred and Leslie W. MacDonald Collection. To view the complete "Lonely Hearts" episode online, see the External links citation below.

Title	Air date
"The Haunted House"	June 15, 1952
"Lonely Hearts"	June 22, 1952
"The Onion Ring"	July 6, 1952
"Mr. Ditto"	July 13, 1952
"Match Head"	July 20, 1952
"Frank N. Stein"	July 27, 1952
"The Frog Man"	August 3, 1952
"Swenn Golly"	August 10, 1952
"The Suit"	August 17, 1952
"The Ice Man"	August 24, 1952
"Evil-Eye Fleegle"	August 31, 1952
"The Sleep Walker"	September 7, 1952
"Batula"	September 14, 1952

=== Wildroot Cream-Oil ===
Fosdick was also licensed for use outside the strip in an advertising campaign for Wildroot Cream-Oil, a popular men's hair tonic of the postwar period. Fosdick's image on tin signs and counter displays became a prominent fixture in barbershops across America in the late 1940s through the mid-1950s, as well as in animated TV commercials. A long-running series of print ads appeared in newspapers, national magazines (such as Life, Boys' Life, and Argosy), and comic books (including Archie Comics, Gang Busters, All-Star Western, Casper the Friendly Ghost, Mystery in Space, House of Mystery, All-American Men of War, and The Adventures of Dean Martin and Jerry Lewis). Scores of comic strip-format ads were produced, usually featuring Fosdick's farcical triumphs over his archvillain nemesis "Anyface." Anyface was a murderous, shape-shifting scoundrel whose plastic facial features could be molded into any identity—or any animal, object or appliance. However, he was always given away in the last panels by his telltale dandruff and messy, unkempt hair. The ads would invariably end with a running gag of Fosdick advising readers to "Get Wildroot Cream-Oil, Charlie!"-with the disclaimer "That would be illegal-my name is ...".

Fearless Fosdick and Bomb Face (May 30, 1943)

Although Li'l Abner was heavily merchandised in the 1940s and 1950s (especially the Shmoo), Fosdick products are relatively rare and highly valued by collectors. There was a rubber Halloween mask manufactured by Topstone, and a chalkware statue of the character was issued by Artrix Products in 1951. Various Wildroot tie-ins and giveaways also appeared, such as window decals, matchbook covers, and collegiate book jackets. More recently, Dark Horse Comics issued a limited edition Fearless Fosdick statue in 2001 (complete with a cannonball-sized hole through his midsection), #17 in their line of Classic Comic Characters figures. Various nostalgic reproductions of Wildroot advertising tin signs have also been recently available.

== Influence and legacy ==
Fearless Fosdick was almost certainly Harvey Kurtzman's major inspiration for creating his irreverent Mad magazine, which began in 1952 as a comic book that specifically parodied other comic books and strips in a similar style and similarly subversive manner. By the time EC Comics published Mad #1, Capp had been doing Fearless Fosdick for nearly a decade. Parallels between Li'l Abner and the early Mad are unmistakable: the incongruous use of mock-Yiddish slang terms, the nose-thumbing disdain for pop cultural icons, the rampant and pervasive sick humor, the pointedly subversive tone, the total disregard for sentiment and the extremely broad visual styling. Even the trademark comic signs that clutter the backdrops of Will Elder's panels would seem to have a precedent in Li'l Abner, in the headquarters of Dogpatch entrepreneur Available Jones. Tellingly, Kurtzman resisted parodying either Li'l Abner or Dick Tracy in the comic book Mad, despite their prominence. (Both Li'l Abner and Dick Tracy were later satirized in EC's Panic, "the only authorized imitation of Mad," edited by Al Feldstein.)

Elements of Fearless Fosdick can be gleaned in Bob Clampett's classic Warner Bros. cartoon The Great Piggy Bank Robbery (1946), as when avid "fan" Daffy Duck makes a panicked dash to the mailbox to retrieve the latest comic book, just like Li'l Abner often did. Later, after Daffy portrays his alter ego "Duck Twacy" in a manic nightmare sequence (complete with bullet-riddled corpses and "impossible" villains with names like "Jukebox Jaw," "Pickle Puss," "88 Teeth" and "Neon Noodle"), he "wakes up" in a rural, Dogpatch-like setting—on a pig farm.

Cartoonist/illustrator Frank Cho, a Li'l Abner fan, occasionally references Fearless Fosdick in his comic strip Liberty Meadows in the guise of "Fearless Detective Richard Stacey." Fosdick has also turned up in Zippy the Pinhead by Bill Griffith. Johnny Hart, creator of B.C. and The Wizard of Id, also cited Fearless Fosdick as one of his early inspirations. Comedian Chuck McCann portrayed a decidedly Fosdick-like Dick Tracy parody character, complete with stage makeup, named "Detective Dick H. Dump of Bunko Squad" on his irreverent WNEW-TV kids show in the sixties.

== Beyond the strip-within-a-strip ==
- Fearless Fosdick invaded the 1968 presidential campaign, as Democratic candidate Hubert Humphrey accused his Republican opponent Richard Nixon of playing loose with law and order issues. "His [Nixon's] privilege, if he wants to play Fearless Fosdick," said Humphrey.
- "Fearless Fosdick" is also the title of a jazz instrumental by Bill Holman, recorded live by Vic Lewis and His Orchestra with Tubby Hayes in 1954. Another, unrelated jazz composition, "Fearless Fosdick's Tune," was composed and recorded by Umberto Fiorentino for his Brave Art/Columbia-Sony CD, Things to Come (2002).
- Fearless Fosdick is an example of a metafictional character—a character who exists in a separate fictional realm within an already fictional universe. Other metafictional (or fictional fictional) characters in modern popular culture include Itchy and Scratchy and The Happy Little Elves, the cartoons-within-a-cartoon in The Simpsons, and the science fiction "works" of fictional author Kilgore Trout, which reappear sporadically within the novels of Kurt Vonnegut.
- The popular Canadian children's novel The Secret World of Og (1961) by Pierre Berton features a cat called "Earless Osdick," because he kept his ears down like the dog he thought he was.
- Fosdick's oft-mentioned weekly salary of $22.50 is a direct reference to Al Capp's own pitiful salary when he was still an anonymous "ghost" on Ham Fisher's Joe Palooka, according to Li'l Abner expert Denis Kitchen. Kitchen believes that Fisher was meant to cringe every time the amount was mentioned, as he writes in the notes to Al Capp's Li'l Abner: The Frazetta Years.
- According to The Marx Brothers Scrapbook (1974, Richard J. Anobile, ed.), comedian Harpo Marx, a professed Li'l Abner fan, named one of his dogs "Fearless Fosdick" for its extraordinary dauntlessness.
- In a Mad Magazine parody which once asked if cartoon characters really aged, it had Fearless Fosdick finally retired from the police and spending his declining years in Dogpatch, living with Li'l Abner and Daisy Mae - who now look like the late Pappy and Mammy Yokum.
- Sharp-eyed viewers of Warren Beatty's big screen adaptation of Dick Tracy (1990 film) will have detected a direct, onscreen homage to Fearless Fosdick. The "opera" Tracy is seen attending when his 2-way wrist radio suddenly calls him to duty is titled "Die Schlmpf" in the end credits—presumably after Elmer Schlmpf, the maniacal (albeit deceased) product-tampering fiend from "The Case of the Poisoned Beans."
- Comic book writers Marv Wolfman and Craig Miller developed Fearless Fosdick for a big screen, live-action comedy in the 1990s, but the project to date remains unsold.
- In a recent episode of Gasoline Alley showing retired cartoon characters, one storyline has Maggie of Bringing up Father's pearl necklace missing. Fearless Fosdick is his usual incompetent stupid self - he wrongly thinks Walt Wallet is the thief.
- On June 26, 2016, Fearless Fosdick partnered with Dick Tracy in a dream sequence in the Dick Tracy comic.
