= Sadie Hawkins dance =

School dance to which women invite men

A Sadie Hawkins dance or turnabout is a usually informal dance sponsored by a high school, middle school or college, to which the ladies invite the gentlemen to be their dates. This is a gender role reversal, contrary to the custom of the gentlemen typically inviting the ladies to be their dates to school dances such as prom in the spring and homecoming in the fall. These dances are primarily an American tradition.

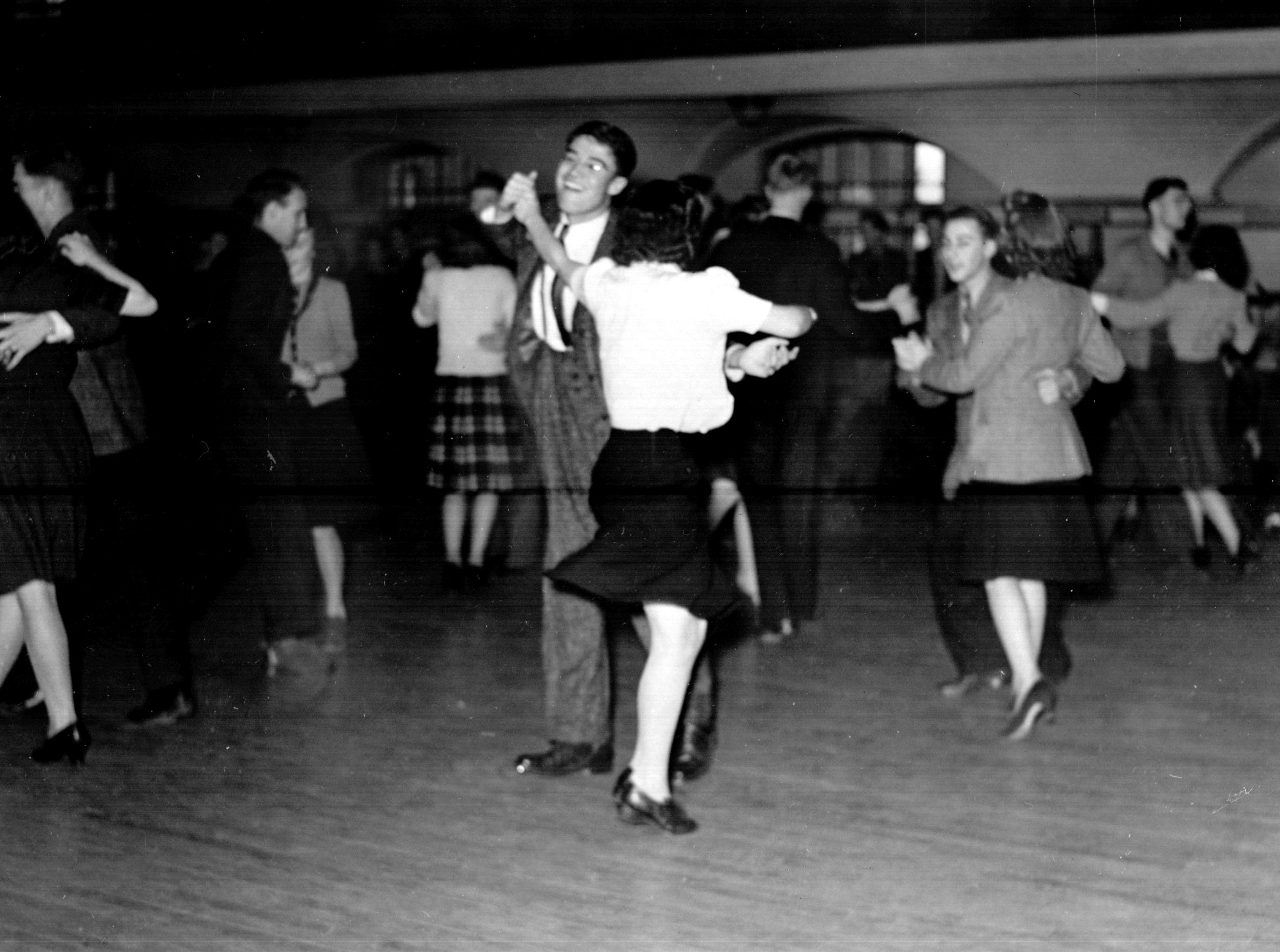
Young men and women dance at the "Sadie Daze" dance in February 1942

== Origin ==
The Sadie Hawkins dance is named after the Li'l Abner comic strip character Sadie Hawkins, created by cartoonist Al Capp. In the strip, Sadie Hawkins Day fell on a given day in November, on which the unmarried women of Dogpatch would chase the bachelors and "marry up" with the ones that they caught. The event was introduced in a daily strip that ran on November 15, 1937.

The date for Sadie Hawkins Day most commonly reported is November 13, two days before the first appearance in the comics, but the exact date was never actually specified by Al Capp until he finally set it as November 26 in his last Li'l Abner daily strip on November 5, 1977.

== History ==
By 1939, two years after the daily strip that introduced the concept, Sadie Hawkins events were held at over 200 colleges, according to Life magazine.

== Similar dance events ==
The Tolo Dance in the Pacific Northwest began several decades before Capp's comic strip. The word tolo comes from the University of Washington's Mortar Board, which began as an all-women's honor society called the "Tolo Club", named for a Chinook Jargon word that allegedly means "to win", "to earn", or "to succeed". To raise funds, the group first held a dance where women asked men in 1909.

== See also ==
- Gender roles
- Leap year, for traditions on women proposing marriage
- Powder Puff, a football game pitting girls against girls
- Winter Formal, a formal dance that may be had instead of Sadie Hawkins dances from January through March
