= Lower Slobbovia =

Fictional country

Lower Slobbovia (also sometimes Outer, Inner, Central, Upper or Lowest Slobbovia) is a fictional country, vaguely Slavic or Balkan, portrayed as underdeveloped, socially backward, remote, impoverished, and unenlightened. Coined by Al Capp in 1946, the term has also been used by Americans to refer in an informal way to any foreign country of no particular distinction.

In the humor magazine Sex to Sexty, the term Slobbovian was used in jokes as a generic term for a foreigner or minority representative (usually one fitting Black stereotypes).

== Origin ==
The term was created by cartoonist Al Capp to refer to a setting in his classic hillbilly comic strip, Li'l Abner (1934–1977). Making its first appearance on April 4, 1946, frigid, faraway Lower Slobbovia was fashioned as a pointedly political satire of backward nations and foreign diplomacy. The term, having entered the language, remains a contemporary reference.

In Li'l Abner, the hapless residents of Lower Slobbovia were perpetually waist-deep in snow, and icicles hung from every frostbitten nose. The favorite dish of the starving natives was raw polar bear (and vice versa). Lower Slobbovians spoke with burlesque pidgin-Russian accents; the miserable frozen wasteland of Capp's invention abounded in incongruous Yiddish humor. General Bullmoose or Senator Jack S. Phogbound—Capp's caricatures of ruthless businessmen and corrupt politicians, respectively—were often pitted against the pathetic Lower Slobbovians in a classic mismatch of haves versus have-nots.

Capp conceived Slobbovia as a large iceberg. As real icebergs at intervals have their larger subsea components erode away, causing genuine icebergs to invert, so Slobbovia periodically overturned, making Upper Slobbovia into Lower Slobbovia & vice versa. Upper Slobbovia was the only habitat of the Schmeagles, birds who flew so fast they could not be seen.

Conceptually based on Siberia, or perhaps specifically on Birobidzhan, Capp's icy hellhole was ruled by King Stubbornovsky the Last (a.k.a. Good King Nogoodnik). The Slobbovian politicians were even more corrupt than their Dogpatch counterparts. Their monetary unit was the "Rasbucknik", of which one was worth nothing, and a large quantity was worth even less, due to the trouble of lugging them around. Conditions couldn't be worse, as tourists were readily assured by the miserable, highly vocal residents.

Besides biting political satire, Capp employed black humor, irony, social commentary, parody and slapstick in his Slobbovia stories; the series featured many memorable moments over the years. Lena the Hyena was a resident of Lower Slobbovia, as was Slobbovian correspondent Quentin Rasputinreynolds (a parody of World War II journalist Quentin Reynolds). The local children were read harrowing tales from Ice-sop's Fables, which were parodies of classic literary fables (with titles like "Goldilocks and the Three Bares" and "Liddle Blue Ridink Hood"), but with a darkly sardonic twist.

In the I Love Lucy episode "First Stop", Fred Mertz refers to the location of a back-road hotel as Lower Slobbovia.

== See also ==
- Dystopia
