= Sadie Hawkins Day =

American folk event and pseudo-holiday

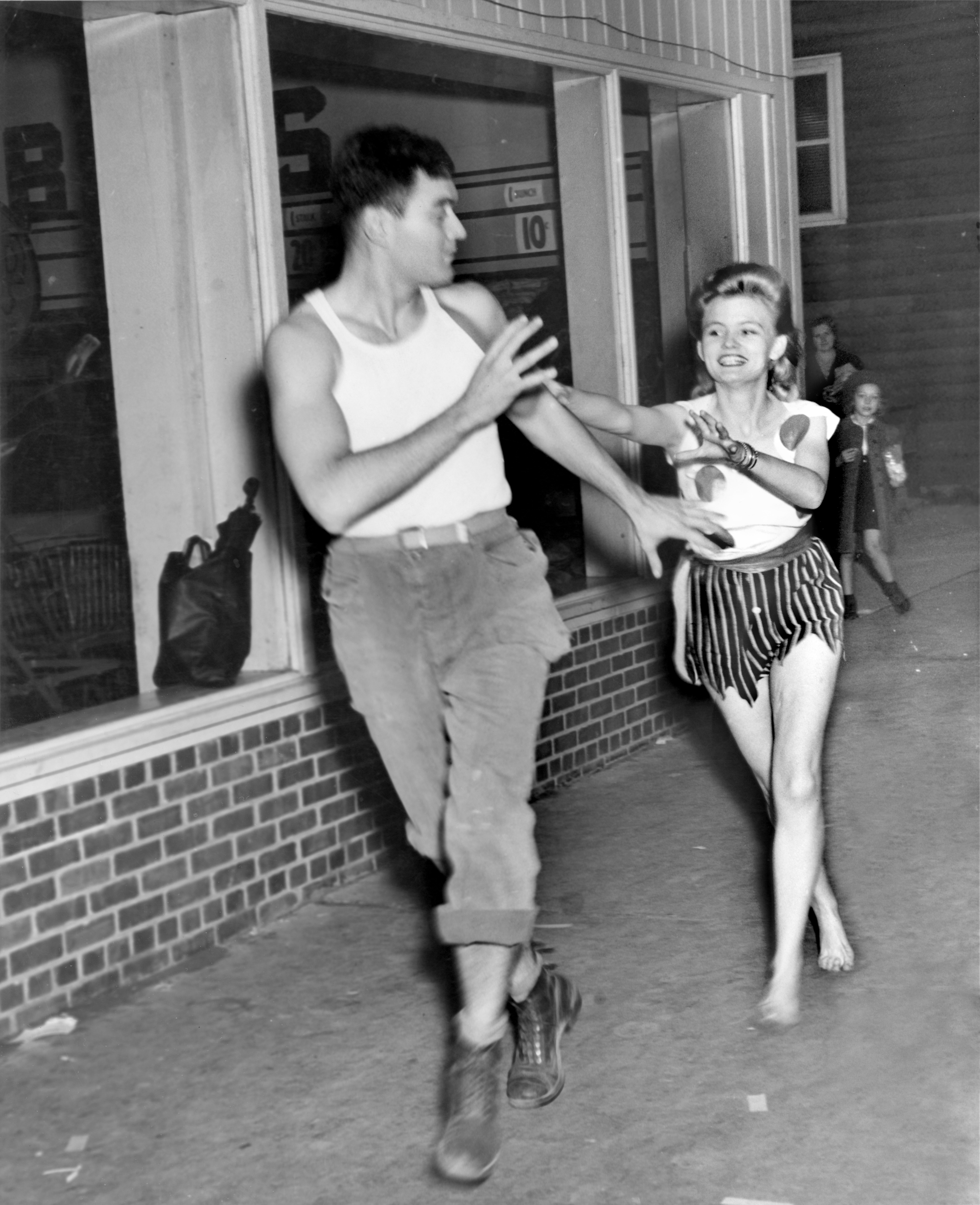
- 1944 reenactment of Sadie Hawkins Day race
- Genre: Folk event and pseudo-holiday
- Date: November 13th
- Location: United States
- Major events: Women ask men for a date or dancing

Sadie Hawkins Day is an American folk event and pseudo-holiday originated by Al Capp's hillbilly comic strip Li'l Abner (1934–1977). The annual comic strip storyline inspired real-world Sadie Hawkins events, the premise of which is that women ask men for a date or dancing. "Sadie Hawkins Day" was introduced in the comic strip on November 15, 1937; the storyline ran until the beginning of December. The storyline was revisited the following October/November, and inspired a fad on college campuses. By 1939, Life reported that 201 colleges in 188 cities held a Sadie Hawkins Day event.

== Comic strip ==
In Li'l Abner, Sadie Hawkins was the daughter of Mayor Hekzebiah Hawkins, one of Dogpatch's earliest settlers and the "homeliest gal in all them hills". She grew frantic waiting for suitors until she reached age 35 and was still a spinster, and her father was worried about her living at home for the rest of her life. In desperation, he called together all the unmarried men of Dogpatch and declared it "Sadie Hawkins Day". A foot race was decreed with Sadie pursuing the town's eligible bachelors. If Sadie caught one of them, he would be forced to marry her. She was specifically interested in a handsome boy named Adam who was already in a courtship with Theresa, whose father was the area's largest potato farmer. Unlike Sadie, Theresa had a number of courtship offers.

As the event became a tradition in the comic strip, Capp added more story elements. Each year, the Sadie Hawkins storyline begins with a prophecy by Old Man Mose, who gives Li'l Abner a cryptic clue about the end of the storyline, which always comes true in a roundabout, surprising way. The storyline sometimes also includes the Sadie Hawkins Eve Dance which is held on the previous evening, when the young women wear hobnailed boots and stomp on their partners' feet, to make the bachelors run slower during the event.

== Impact ==
Inspired by Capp's satiric race in which eligible women chase down terrified bachelors for the purposes of wedlock, the event reverses the cultural norms of men as the romantic pursuers. Arthur Berger says that the day "represents a fertility rite and awakens an awareness of the relationship between the American courtship and more 'primitive' rites."

== Date ==
The date for Sadie Hawkins Day most commonly reported is November 13, two days before the first appearance in the comics. The date has on occasion been confused for February 29 (Leap Day), the date for Bachelor's Day according to the original Irish tradition of women being allowed to propose marriage.

Al Capp finally set the date for Sadie Hawkins Day as November 26, in his last Li'l Abner daily strip on November 5, 1977.

== See also ==
- Sadie Hawkins dance
