= Dogpatch =

Fictional stone-age community in the Li'l Abner comic strip

Dogpatch was the fictional setting of cartoonist Al Capp's classic comic strip Li'l Abner (1934–1977).

== Li'l Abner comic strip ==
The inhabitants of Dogpatch were mostly lazy hillbillies, who usually wanted nothing to do with progress. Li'l Abner's backwater hometown chiefly consisted of dismal log cabin hovels, pine trees, "tarnip" fields and hog wallows—and was often referred to by its inhabitants and outsiders as being the most miserable and unnecessary place on earth. The menfolk were too lazy to work, yet Dogpatch gals were desperate enough to chase them (see Sadie Hawkins Day). Those who farmed their turnip fields watched turnip termites swarm by the billions once a year, locust-like, to devour Dogpatch's only crop (along with their livestock and all their clothing).

Al Capp used to joke that Dogpatch was based on Seabrook, New Hampshire, where he would vacation with his wife, Catherine. A map shown during the story arc of the Shmoo seems to place Dogpatch somewhere around Tennessee or Arkansas. However, one of the earliest (1934) Li'l Abner strips, re-posted on the web by Comics.com in March 2008, explicitly identifies Dogpatch as being in Kentucky and several 1936 strips also clearly place it in Kentucky. One 1936 strip furthermore mentions that Lee City (a small town in eastern Kentucky) is just over 100 mi (160 km) away.

The local geography was fluid and vividly complex; Capp continually changed it to suit either his whims or the current storyline. It has been variously situated in a deep valley, at the base of a peak that's precariously balancing an enormous boulder (Teeterin' Rock), or atop Onnecessary Mountain overlooking an apparently infinite chasm, Bottomless Canyon. It was usually described as situated between the equally fictitious towns of Skonk Hollow (inhabited by lethally dangerous, even more backward mountaineers) and Pineapple Junction. Like the Coconino County depicted in George Herriman's Krazy Kat and the Okefenokee Swamp of Walt Kelly's Pogo, Dogpatch's (and Lower Slobbovia's) distinctive cartoon landscape became as identified with the strip as any of its characters.

Local Dogpatch institutions included West Po'kchop Railroad, which ran perpendicularly up one side of Onnecessary Mountain and straight down the other. A stiffnecked industrialist named Stubborn J. Tolliver built its suicidal grade to satisfy a boyish dream of his son, Idiot J. Tolliver. To keep his boy happy, Tolliver starts one train a week up the tracks. Each train falls back with a crash, killing all its passengers. Another daily hazard, the Skonk Works, was almost as lethal. Scores have been done in by the fumes of the concentrated "skonk" oil which is brewed and barreled at the factory by its owner and "inside man", Big Barnsmell; and his cousin, "outside man" Barney Barnsmell (see also Skunk Works).

Mail was very slow, with the ancient, white-bearded postmaster and his creaky jackass mount (Young Eddie McSkonk and U.S. Mule) often feeling too stressed to deliver the cobweb-covered sacks of timeworn letters marked "Rush" at the Dogpatch Express post office. Dogpatch's various feature attractions also included Kissin' Rock (handy to Suicide Cliff), the Jubilation T. Cornpone memorial statue, and Dogpatch Airlines, with decrepit World War I aviator Cap'n Eddie Ricketyback, proprietor (a pun on Eddie Rickenbacker).

== Theme park ==
In 1967, Al Capp licensed and had an interest in an 800-acre (3.2 km^{2}) $35 million theme park called Dogpatch USA in Marble Falls near Harrison, Arkansas, based on the comic strip's setting and featuring a trout farm, carriage and horseback rides, entertainment by characters from the Li'l Abner comic strip, and eventually amusement rides. Opening in 1968, the park had 300,000 visitors in its first year.

The park closed in 1993 due to mismanagement and financial debt. It had been scheduled to reopen as Heritage USA Ozarks Resort in 2020, but in 2020 it was sold to Bass Pro Shops founder Johnny Morris for $1.12 million, to become "a nature experience for future generations to enjoy." Morris is reportedly interested in "restoration of the large natural spring and bringing back to life the renowned trout hatchery and many future fishing opportunities."

== Other uses ==
- U.S. Army and Marine Corps units in Vietnam during the Vietnam War often called their housing compounds "Dogpatches", due to the primitive conditions.
- The term was used by American chemical engineers such as William J. Wilcox, Jr. and Warren Fuchs, during World War II who were working on the Manhattan Project; the engineers used the term from the comic strip to describe their first Rochester dormitories, with dark and dismal furniture and used beds from an old YMCA, and kept using the term when they transferred to Oak Ridge, Tennessee.
- 47th Fighter Squadron is known as the DogPatchers, and their A-10C aircraft are named after the characters from Li'l Abner. Each airplane has artwork depicting these characters located on the inside of the boarding ladder door.
- Dogpatch is also the name of a restaurant in Munising, Michigan, United States.
- Various cities and towns have neighborhoods, often lower social class, nicknamed "Dogpatch" in reference to the comic strip's locale, including
  - Marble Falls, Arkansas
  - Dogpatch, San Francisco
  - Dog Patch, West Virginia
  - Edmonton
  - Greater Sudbury
  - Calgary
