= Ralph Fuller =

American cartoonist

- Fuller in a photo from 1950
- Born: March 9, 1890 Capac, Michigan, U.S.
- Died: August 16, 1963 (aged 73) Boothbay Harbor, Maine
- Area: Cartoonist
- Pseudonym: RB. Fuller
- Notable works: Oaky Doaks
- Spouse: Alexa

Ralph Briggs Fuller (March 9, 1890 – August 16, 1963) was an American cartoonist best known for his long-running comic strip Oaky Doaks, featuring the humorous adventures of a good-hearted knight in the Middle Ages. He signed the strips R. B. Fuller.

== Biography ==
=== Early life and education ===
Born in Capac, Michigan, Fuller was the oldest child of six children born to Louise and Arthur Fuller. The Fuller family lived in Richmond, Michigan, where his father was a druggist. He was 16 when he sold his first cartoon to Life for $8. In the following mail, he received a letter from Life requesting the return of the $8 because they had previously used that gag. He did send back the $8. However, he soon sold Life another cartoon and followed with contributions to the New York World's Fun supplement in 1910.

Fuller studied at the Chicago Academy of Fine Arts and went to work as a staff artist for the Chicago Daily News. While he was at the Daily News, he received $100 for the first color picture ever published by Life. That triggered a desire to work in magazine illustration, and he moved to New York, where he lived at 17 Livingston Street. After a 1914 trip to England, Fuller and his wife Alexa lived at 217 East 16th Street in Brooklyn. By 1920, the couple and their children Robert and Elizabeth were living at 170 Ames Avenue in Leonia, New Jersey.

=== Magazine cartoonist ===
For years he contributed cartoons to Puck, Judge, Collier's, Harper's, Liberty, Ballyhoo, College Humor and The New Yorker. He had his own feature, Fuller Humor, in Judge during the 1920s. With the collapse of Judge and other humor magazines, Fuller's freelance markets were diminishing, so he considered doing a comic strip. AP Newsfeatures offered him a detective strip, but Fuller wanted to take a humorous approach.

=== Oaky Doaks ===
In 1935, Fuller had a syndicate offer to take over a top humor strip because it was believed the creator was planning to leave. However, Fuller had a tough decision to make, since AP Newsfeatures was auditioning several artists to draw Oaky Doaks, scripted by the syndicate's comics editor, Bill McCleery. Fuller recalled that AP handed him several pages of Oaky Doaks script to look over. He walked to the Roosevelt Hotel, where he sat in the lobby reading the script. When he finished, he had made his decision; he saw the comic possibilities of Oaky Doaks, and he also would have the opportunity to do a strip displaying his name as the artist.

Oaky Doaks was launched on June 17, 1935, many months before the start of Prince Valiant. For two years, Fuller and McCleery collaborated (with no credit given to McCleery as scripter). Fuller eventually took over the writing as well as the art, along with other writing by M. J. Wing.

The Oaky Doaks Sunday strip, which began in 1941, was initially drawn by Bill Dyer (who also worked on The Adventures of Patsy) and later by Fuller. Oaky Doaks visited Camelot in the 1940s, but he later went to the Kingdom of Uncertainia, where he remained until the strip ended in 1961.

Fuller was also an accomplished watercolorist and a member of the Leonia, New Jersey art colony. He drew Oaky Doaks from his home in Tenafly, New Jersey, where his studio, painted light green and curtained in gold, overlooked his back lawn. In 1950, he reflected:

I liked a sequence when Oaky was captured by the Vikings. They got over to the American Coast and got mixed up with the Indians. That gave me Vikings, and Indians as well as knighthood to burlesque. I just finished a Sunday sequence where there was a combination of pirates and Indians and buried gold, shipwrecks, cast-ashore-on-a-desert-island and anything a kid would want in a feature. I was sorry when I had to quit it. I think every man has a little of the knight in him... I think a situation is funnier than a gag—but if you get both, it's really fine. Maybe I'm trying to burlesque the serious adventure strips, I don't know.

Oaky Doaks came to an end when the comics division of AP Newsfeatures folded in 1961.

=== Later life and death ===
A resident of Tenafly, New Jersey, Fuller died two years later in Boothbay Harbor, Maine, where he had a summer home.
