= AP Newsfeatures =

Cartoon and comic strip division of Associated Press

- Formerly: Associated Press Feature Service; AP Features
- Company type: Subsidiary
- Industry: Print syndication
- Founded: 1930; 96 years ago
- Defunct: 1961; 65 years ago
- Headquarters: New York City, New York, U.S.
- Area served: United States
- Key people: I. M. Kendrick, Kent Cooper, Charles Elsworth Honce, M. J. ("Joe") Wing
- Products: Comic strips, editorial cartoons
- Owner: Associated Press

Tom Paprocki's Sport Slants (December 13, 1953). AP Newsfeatures carried Paprocki's panel as part of its Sunday package from 1942 to March 5, 1955. To see this image at a full resolution, go to Stripper's Guide.

AP Newsfeatures, also AP Features, was the cartoon and comic strip division of Associated Press, which syndicated strips from 1930 to the early 1960s.

== History ==
=== Origins ===
In February 1930, I. M. Kendrick, executive assistant to AP president Kent Cooper, announced a March 17, 1930, launch for the Associated Press Feature Service, with an initial nine units, including a daily news cartoon, various comic strips and several panels. With the expansion of the Associated Press Feature Service to include a comprehensive comic strip and cartoon service for evening papers, AP that April announced plans to provide a similar service for morning papers. Cooper commented:

The Associated Press activities today in the feature service field are a natural outgrowth of what used to be the daily mail letter, which the Associated Press called the supplemental mail service. I held that since there was matter going out by mail it might as well go out in the best possible way that we could produce it, which, of course, meant the inclusion of illustrations, regular columns, etc.

=== The 1930 launch ===
The first nine features:

- Gloria, a daily "pretty girl" strip with continuity, by Julian Ollendorf (who also worked on the animated Topics of the Day and Sketchographs)
- Homer Hoopee, a daily family strip by Fred Locher (former creator of Cicero Sapp for the New York Evening World)
- Colonel Gilfeather, an imitation of Our Boarding House in a daily three-column panel by Dick Dorgan (brother of the cartoonist Tad Dorgan)
- Scorchy Smith, an aviation-adventure strip by John Terry (who also worked on animated cartoons)
- Rollo Rollingstone, a daily strip by Bruce Barr
- Modest Maidens, a two-column "pretty girl" panel by Don Flowers
- news cartoon by Lance Nolly (formerly of the Austin American and the Dallas News)
- three-column village life feature by Oscar Hitt
- two-column cartoon by Aleyn Burtis

The AP service eventually made a full page of daily strips available, including Dickie Dare and Oaky Doaks. Other strips carried by AP included C. Mozier's Junior's Viewpoint (1935), Aldine Swank's panel Beautyettes (1935), Frank Stevens' Li'l Chief Hot-Shot (1945–46), Ed Sullivan's The Nerve of Some People (1945–46), George Wunder's See for Yourself (1946), Rome Siemon's Little Moonfolks (1952), Bud Sagendorf's Spur Line (1954-55) and Sylvia Robbins' panel, Don't Do That (1950–56). How Christmas Began, which first appeared in 1951 and ran annually for five days each Christmas week, was drawn in an outline form, minus blacks or shadows, so children could color the panels.

Flowers also created Oh, Diana!, which was continued by Bill Champe and Phil Berube after Flowers left AP for King Features. Virginia Clark was drawing Oh, Diana! in 1947. Flowers' other AP creation, Modest Maidens, was taken over by AP staff artist Jay Alan.

AP carried a set number of strips, so a new strip was not added until one was dropped. When the Oaky Doaks daily debuted on June 17, 1935, it replaced Harold Detje's Be Scientific with Ol' Doc Dabble which ran from June 6, 1932, until June 15, 1935. In a similar fashion, when Milton Caniff learned of an opening while he was working on AP spot illustrations, he spent the weekend drawing samples, and Caniff's strip career was launched when his Dickie Dare began in 1933. The following year, Dickie Dare was taken over by Coulton Waugh.

In 1944, Charles Elsworth Honce became the assistant general manager of all AP special services, overseeing AP Newsfeatures and World Wide Photos, and that same year M. J. ("Joe") Wing stepped in as the general editor of AP Newsfeatures.

The strips variously carried the tag "AP Newsfeatures," "AP Features" or in some cases, "The A.P."

=== AP Sunday comics ===
Over a decade passed before AP finally introduced Sunday strips on March 7, 1942, in the New York Post. The initial line-up:

Bill Champi's Oh, Diana!

- The Adventures of Patsy
- Dickie Dare
- Homer Hoopee
- Modest Maidens
- Neighborly Neighbors
- Oaky Doaks
- Scorchy Smith
- Sport Slants
- Strictly Private
- Things To Come

AP sports cartoonist Tom Paprocki's Sport Slants began with the Sunday strips in 1942 and continued until March 6, 1955. Fred Locher worked with Rand Taylor on Homer Hoopee, and Phil Berube drew the strip's final three years (1953–56). Hank Barrow wrote and drew Things to Come, an AP Sunday feature focusing on speculative technology. The title derived from H. G. Wells science fiction novel, The Shape of Things to Come (1933). When Barrow departed in 1949 or 1950, the feature was taken over by Jim Bresnan.

The Associated Press discontinued distribution of comic strips in 1961.

== AP Newsfeatures strips and panels ==
- The Adventures of Patsy (1935–1954) originally by Mel Graff
- Be Scientific with Ol' Doc Dabble by Harold Detje (June 6, 1932–June 15, 1935)
- Beautyettes by Aldine Swank (1935)
- Colonel Gilfeather / Mister Gilfeather / The Gay Thirties (March 17, 1930–Fall 1934), originally by Richard W. Dorgan — as Colonel Gilfeather, appeared in about 80 newspapers; title later changed by Al Capp and then again by Milton Caniff
- Dickie Dare originally by Milton Caniff and then Coulton Waugh (July 31, 1933–1957)
- Don't Do That by Sylvia Robbins (née Sneidman) (1950–1956)
- Gloria by Julian Ollendorff (March 17, 1930–?)
- Homer Hoopee (March 17, 1930–1956), originally by Fred Locher & Rand Taylor, then by Phil Berube
- How Christmas Began by Sylvia Robbins (née Sneidman) (1951–?)
- It Happens That Way Sometimes by Oscar Hitt (1930)
- Junior's Viewpoint by C. Mozier (1935)
- Li'l Chief Hot-Shot by Frank Stevens (1945–1946)
- Little Moonfolks by Rome Siemon (1952)
- Modest Maidens (March 17, 1930–October 20, 1945) by Don Flowers and then Jay Alan
- Neighborly Neighbors (c. 1936––1955) originally by Oscar Hitt (c. 1936–1938) and then John Milt Morris (1938–1955)
- The Nerve of Some People by Ed Sullivan (1945–1946)
- Oaky Doaks (June 17, 1935–1961)
- Oh, Diana! (1931–c. 1947) originally by Don Flowers and then Bill Champe, Phil Berube, and Virginia Clark
- Puffy the Pig (October 13, 1930–c.1935) by Don Flowers (1930–1931), then by W. A. Kolliker (1931–1933), Milton Caniff, and Mel Graff
- Rollo Rollingstone (March 17, 1930–1933) originally by Bruce Barr (1930–1932) and then Tom Paprocki (1932–1933)
- Scorchy Smith originally by John Terry (March 17, 1930–December 1961)
- See for Yourself by George Wunder (1946)
- Sport Slants by Tom Paprocki (March 7, 1942–March 6, 1955)
- Spur Line by Bud Sagendorf (1954-1955)
- Strictly Private / Peter Plink by Quin Hall (1940s)
- Things To Come originally by Hank Barrow, then by Jim Bresnan (c. 1941–January 30, 1955)
