= Dickie Dare =

American comic strip

- Author(s): Milton Caniff (1933–1934); Coulton Waugh (1934–1944; 1950–1957); Odin Burvik (1944–1947); Fran Matera (1948–1949)
- Current status/schedule: Concluded daily & Sunday strip
- Launch date: July 31, 1933
- End date: October 12, 1957
- Syndicate(s): AP Newsfeatures
- Genre: Adventure

Dickie Dare was an adventure comic strip syndicated by AP Newsfeatures. Launched July 31, 1933, it was the first comic strip created by Milton Caniff before he began Terry and the Pirates. The strip ended on October 12, 1957.

== Publication history ==
In 1932, Caniff moved to New York City to accept an artist position in the Features Service of the Associated Press. He did general assignment art for several months, drawing the strips Dickie Dare and The Gay Thirties, then inherited a panel cartoon called Mister Gilfeather in September 1932 when Al Capp left the feature. Caniff continued Gilfeather until the spring of 1933, when it was retired in favor of a generic comedy in a panel cartoon, The Gay Thirties, which he produced until he left AP in the fall of 1934.

Caniff left the strip in late 1934 to work on Terry and the Pirates, which followed the same theme of boy hero with two-fisted adult mentor. Caniff's last credited strip ran December 1, 1934.

=== Subsequent creators ===
Dickie Dare

Coulton Waugh began drawing Dickie Dare in the middle of a story, and drew the strip for almost ten years, ending on February 26, 1944. In 1944, Waugh left to work on another strip, his wife and assistant, Odin Waugh, became the Dickie Dare illustrator from 1944 to 1948. Fran Matera took over the strip on March 8, 1948, and continued until the strip ended on October 12, 1957.

During the 1930s and 1940s, Waugh worked at his studio located in suburban Newburgh, New York.

== Characters and story ==
In July 1933, Caniff began the adventure-fantasy, Dickie Dare, influenced by series such as Flash Gordon and Brick Bradford. The eponymous central character was a 12-year-old who dreamed himself into adventures with such literary and legendary persons as Robin Hood, Robinson Crusoe and King Arthur. In the spring of 1934, Caniff changed the strip from fantasy to reality, adding a new character, Dan Flynn, a freelance writer and friend of Dickie's father. At this juncture, Dickie no longer dreamed his adventures but experienced them while touring the world with "Dynamite Dan" Flynn. The duo shared many adventures during the next couple of decades.

After Waugh returned to the strip, he stayed on until it ended in 1957. In the final decade, Dickie aged from a 12-year-old to a Navy Cadet.
