= Don Flowers =

American cartoonist

- Born: 1908 Custer City, Oklahoma, U.S.
- Died: 1968 (aged 59–60)
- Area: Cartoonist
- Notable works: Modest Maidens / Glamor Girls

Don Flowers' Glamor Girls

Don Flowers (1908–1968) was an American cartoonist best known for his syndicated panel Glamor Girls. Flowers was noted for his fluid ink work, prompting Coulton Waugh to write that Flowers displayed "about the finest line ever bequeathed to a cartoonist. It dances; it snaps gracefully back and forth; the touches related."

== Biography ==
=== Early life and education ===
One of three children, Flowers was born in 1908 in Custer City, Oklahoma, to Mabel Flowers and photographer W.A. Flowers. He dropped out of school at age 16 and spent five years working at The Kansas City Star as a staff artist and photo retoucher.

=== Pigs and pin-ups ===
After a brief job with the Chicago American, Flowers moved to New York where he was a staff artist at the Associated Press. He created his first syndicated feature, Puffy the Pig, for AP Newsfeatures in 1930. The following year, he began drawing Oh, Diana! and introduced a pinup-style with Modest Maidens, both for AP Newsfeatures. Modest Maidens brought him a weekly salary of $25, which tripled the following year. During World War II, the gals of Modest Maidens learned first aid, dug in victory gardens, entertained GIs and served as wardens and lookouts.

=== From AP to King Features ===
Modest Maidens became so successful that William Randolph Hearst of King Features Syndicate wanted the feature and offered Flowers double what he earned at AP. However, AP held the rights, so Flowers simply renamed his panel Glamor Girls and signed on with King Features.

Oh, Diana! was continued by Bill Champs and Phil Berube after Flowers left AP for King Features in 1945. Virginia Clark was drawing Oh, Diana! in 1947. Modest Maidens, was taken over by AP staff artist Jay Alan.

At its peak, Glamor Girls ran in 300 newspapers. Flowers continued to draw the Glamor Girls daily and Sunday panels until his 1968 death from emphysema.

== Books ==
During the late 1940s, some 200 Flowers cartoons were published in an Avon paperback. The initial print run of 200,000 copies immediately sold out, followed by a second printing of 215,000 copies. Alex Chun collected Flowers' work for The Glamor Girls of Don Flowers, published by Fantagraphics Books in 2005 with a foreword by Sergio Aragones and an afterword by Don Flowers, Jr.
