= Noel Sickles =

American cartoonist (1910–1982)

- Born: Noel Douglas Sickles; January 24, 1910; Chillicothe, Ohio
- Died: October 3, 1982 (aged 72); Tucson, Arizona
- Occupation: Cartoonist
- Known for: Scorchy Smith
- Awards: National Cartoonists Society's Advertising and Illustration Award, 1960 and 1962; Society of Illustrators Hall of Fame

Noel Sickles' Scorchy Smith was collected in this 1977 book published by Nostalgia Press.

Noel Douglas Sickles (January 24, 1910 – October 3, 1982) was an American commercial illustrator and cartoonist, best known for the comic strip Scorchy Smith.

Sickles was born in Chillicothe, Ohio. Largely self-taught, his career began as a political cartoonist for the Ohio State Journal in the late 1920s. At that time he met and shared a studio with cartoonist Milton Caniff, then working for the Columbus Dispatch. Sickles followed Caniff, creator of the Terry and the Pirates comic strip, to New York City in 1933, where both men initially worked as staff artists for the Associated Press.

== Scorchy Smith ==
Noel Sickles' Scorchy Smith (October 2. 1936)

Sickles was assigned to the action/adventure comic Scorchy Smith, whose creator, John Terry, was suffering from tuberculosis. Loosely modeled on Charles Lindbergh, Scorchy was a pilot-for-hire who flew into numerous high-octane globe-trotting adventures. The series, which started in 1930, was heavily influenced by Roy Crane’s adventure strip Wash Tubbs. Sickles initially illustrated the strip as a ghost artist, but he signed his own name after Terry's 1934 death.

Sickles' artwork was much admired and proved highly influential to other comic strip artists. His compositions were cinematic in style, and he had a brisk, impressionistic style of inking that he referred to as "chiaroscuro." Sickles also was adept in his application of the shading medium Zipatone. Sickles and Caniff worked together for two years, sometimes writing and drawing each other's strips. Caniff acknowledged being heavily influenced by Sickles.

Acknowledging Sickles' influence on his own work, cartoonist Alex Toth described him as an "illustrator/reporter" who "didn't exaggerate. He didn't cartoon things. He played it straight!"

John Romita also recognized the importance of Sickles's work: "Toth loosened everybody up and got everybody wide awake. They all discovered Scorchy Smith. They discovered Sickles because Toth maybe had 300 dailies of Noel Sickles in a stack of Photostats. People were copying from that stack of Photostats, and handing them out to each other. The whole industry was using those Scorchy Smith dailies. And that’s when I found out that Caniff and Sickles had developed that style together. We all sprang from that. I think it lit a fire under the whole industry."

== Magazine illustration ==
Sickles asked the Associated Press for a salary raise in 1936, and when he was turned down, he quit, becoming a successful commercial illustrator. He also ghosted the daily strip The Adventures of Patsy, but otherwise the rest of his career was devoted to magazine illustration. For Life, he illustrated the original publications of The Old Man and the Sea and The Bridges at Toko-Ri.

== Awards and reprints ==
He received the National Cartoonists Society's Advertising and Illustration Award for 1960 and 1962. His Scorchy Smith strips were reprinted in Famous Funnies and in two collections published by Nostalgia Press in the 1970s. The end of his run was reprinted in Big Fun Comics (published by American Comic Archive) which also published Bert Christman's run on the strip. In 2008 IDW Publishing published Scorchy Smith and the Art of Noel Sickles, which reprints the complete 1933–36 run of Scorchy Smith by Sickles. ISBN 1-60010-206-9 He received the Inkpot Award in 1976.

In 1983, Sickles was posthumously inducted into the Society of Illustrators Hall of Fame.

== Death ==
Sickles died in Tucson, Arizona, on October 3, 1982. Sickles was interred in Grandview Cemetery, Chillicothe, Ross County, Ohio.
