= Oaky Doaks =

American comic strip (1935–1961)

- Eastern Color published an Oaky Doaks comic book in July, 1942.
- Author: William McCleery
- Illustrator: Ralph Fuller
- Current status/schedule: Concluded daily & Sunday strip
- Launch date: June 17, 1935
- End date: December 30, 1961
- Syndicate(s): AP Newsfeatures
- Publisher: Eastern Color Printing
- Genre: Humor

Oaky Doaks was an American newspaper comic strip, which ran between June 17, 1935, and December 30, 1961. It was distributed by AP Newsfeatures for more than 25 years, illustrated by veteran magazine cartoonist Ralph Fuller and scripted by AP Newsfeatures comics editor William McCleery.

== Characters and story ==
Launched two years before Prince Valiant, the strip was set in medieval times. Neither a prince nor a knight, Oaky Doaks was merely a muscle-headed farm boy who constructed his suit of armor from the tin roof of a shed. Setting out on his father's plow horse, Nellie, Oaky Doaks rode into a series of misadventures. Scoop described the strip's hero:

The titular star of the strip wasn't tall, dark and handsome, but he was courageous–as courageous as a former farm hand with a plow horse named Nellie and an underwhelming appearance and slightly bumbling, shy personality can be. He was never formally knighted by the king whose domain he helped guard and keep. King Cedric, his leader, was pretty nerdy and underwhelming himself and before long, it became clear that Oaky would have to assume the role of "brains behind the operation."

By the 1950s, the principal characters were Oaky Doaks, King Corny, and Princess Pomona. One got the impression that there was a hopeless romantic relationship between Oaky and Pomona, though it was not certain who was in love with whom.

== Creators ==
Ralph Fuller's Oaky Doaks

McCleery was a prolific writer, and a list of his numerous credits offer some indication as to why he dropped the Oaky Doaks scripting chores. In addition to editing at AP, he was an editor at Life, PM and Ladies' Home Journal. He also was a special projects editor at Princeton University, and he wrote more than 15 plays, with two of his comedies playing on Broadway during the mid-1940s, followed by teleplays for The Philco Television Playhouse and other live television series of the 1950s. His children's book, Wolf Story, was illustrated by Warren Chappell. A Nebraska native, McCleery died January 16, 2000, in Princeton, New Jersey.

Born in Michigan in 1890, Ralph Fuller was 16 when he sold his first cartoon to Life for $8. He studied at the Chicago Academy of Fine Arts and went to work as a staff artist for the Chicago Daily News. For years he contributed cartoons to Puck, Judge, Collier's, Harper's, Liberty, Ballyhoo, College Humor and The New Yorker. He had his own feature, Fuller Humor, in Judge during the 1920s. He moved to New York, began Oaky Doaks and eventually took over the writing as well as the art. In later years he drew Oaky Doaks from his home in Tenafly, New Jersey.

Comics historian Maurice Horn commented, "Oaky Doaks was a solid entry—genuinely funny, superbly drawn and well written." AP carried a set number of comic strips, so when the Oaky Doaks daily debuted on June 17, 1935, it replaced Harold Detje's Be Scientific with Ol' Doc Dabble which ran from June 6, 1932, until June 15, 1935. The Sunday Oaky Doaks, which began in October, 1941, was initially drawn by Bill Dyer (who also worked on The Adventures of Patsy) and later by Fuller.

Oaky Doaks came to an end when the comics division of AP Newsfeatures folded in 1961. Ralph Fuller died two years later, on August 17, 1963.

== Reprints ==
Oaky and Nellie were featured often on the covers of Famous Funnies which reprinted the strip. Eastern Color published an Oaky Doaks comic book in July, 1942.
