= Al Capp =

American cartoonist and humorist (1909–1979)

- Self-portrait
- Born: Alfred Gerald Caplin; September 28, 1909; New Haven, Connecticut, U.S.
- Died: November 5, 1979 (aged 70); South Hampton, New Hampshire, U.S.
- Occupations: Cartoonist, satirist, radio and television commentator
- Known for: L'il Abner
- Spouse: Catherine Wingate (Cameron) Capp (1932–1979; his death)
- Children: Julie Ann Cairol, Catherine Jan Peirce, Colin Cameron Capp (adopted)
- Awards: Inkpot Award (1978)

Alfred Gerald Caplin (September 28, 1909 – November 5, 1979), better known as Al Capp, was an American cartoonist and humorist best known for the satirical comic strip Li'l Abner, which he created in 1934 and continued writing and (with help from assistants) drawing until 1977. He also wrote the comic strips Abbie an' Slats (in the years 1937–1945) and Long Sam (1954). He won the National Cartoonists Society's Reuben Award in 1947 for Cartoonist of the Year, and their 1979 Elzie Segar Award, posthumously for his "unique and outstanding contribution to the profession of cartooning".

Capp's comic strips dealt with urban experiences in the Northern United States until the year he introduced "Li'l Abner". Although Capp was from Connecticut, he spent 43 years writing about the fictional Southern town of Dogpatch, reaching an estimated 60 million readers in more than 900 American newspapers and 100 more papers in 28 countries internationally. M. Thomas Inge says Capp made a large personal fortune through the strip and "had a profound influence on the way the world viewed the American South".

== Early life and education ==
Capp was born in New Haven, Connecticut, of East European Jewish heritage. He was the eldest child of Otto Philip Caplin and Matilda (Davidson) Caplin. Otto Caplin was a failed businessman and an amateur cartoonist; Al's brothers Elliot and Jerome were also cartoonists, and his sister Madeline was a publicist. Capp's parents were both natives of Latvia whose families had migrated to New Haven in the 1880s. "My mother and father had been brought to this country from Russia when they were infants", wrote Capp in 1978. "Their fathers had found that the great promise of America was true—it was no crime to be a Jew." The Caplins were indigent; Capp recalled stories of his mother going out in the night to sift through ash barrels for reusable bits of coal.

In August 1919, at age nine, Capp was run over by a trolley car and had his left leg amputated above the knee. According to his father Otto's unpublished autobiography, young Capp was not prepared for the amputation beforehand; having been in a coma for days, he suddenly awoke to discover that his leg had been removed. He was eventually given a prosthetic leg but only learned to use it by adopting a slow way of walking which became increasingly painful as he aged. The childhood tragedy of losing a leg likely helped shape Capp's cynical worldview, which was darker and more sardonic than that of most newspaper cartoonists. "I was indignant as hell about that leg," he revealed in a November 1950 interview in Time magazine.

"The secret of how to live without resentment or embarrassment in a world in which I was different from everyone else", Capp philosophically wrote, "was to be indifferent to that difference." The prevailing opinion among his friends was that Capp's Swiftian satire was, to some degree, a creatively channeled, compensatory response to his disability.

"I do Li'l Abner!!," a self-portrait by Al Capp, excerpted from the April 16–17, 1951 Li'l Abner strips; note the reference to Milton Caniff

Capp's father introduced him to drawing as a form of therapy. He became quite proficient, advancing mostly on his own. Among his earliest influences were Punch cartoonist–illustrator Phil May and American comic strip cartoonists Tad Dorgan, Cliff Sterrett, Rube Goldberg, Rudolph Dirks, Fred Opper, Billy DeBeck, George McManus, and Milt Gross. At about this same time, Capp became a voracious reader. According to Capp's brother Elliot, Alfred had finished all of Shakespeare and George Bernard Shaw before he was 13 years old. Among his childhood favorites were Dickens, Smollett, Mark Twain, Booth Tarkington, and later, Robert Benchley and S. J. Perelman.

Capp spent five years at Bridgeport High School in Bridgeport, Connecticut, without receiving a diploma. He liked to joke about how he failed geometry for nine straight terms. His formal training came from a series of art schools in the Northeast. Attending three of them in rapid succession, the impoverished Capp was thrown out of each for nonpayment of tuition—the Boston Museum School of Fine Arts, the Pennsylvania Academy of the Fine Arts, and Designers Art School in Boston—the last before launching his career. Capp already had decided to become a cartoonist. "I heard that Bud Fisher (creator of Mutt and Jeff) got $3,000 a week and was constantly marrying French countesses", Capp said. "I decided that was for me."

In early 1932, Capp hitchhiked to New York City. He lived in "airless rat holes" in Greenwich Village and turned out advertising strips at $2 each while scouring the city hunting for jobs. He eventually found work at the Associated Press when he was 23 years old. By March 1932, Capp was drawing Colonel Gilfeather, a single-panel, AP-owned property created in 1930 by Dick Dorgan. Capp changed the focus and title to Mister Gilfeather but soon grew to hate the feature. He left the Associated Press in September 1932. Before leaving, he met Milton Caniff and the two became lifelong friends. Capp moved to Boston and married Catherine Wingate Cameron, whom he had met earlier in art class. She died in 2006 at the age of 96.

Leaving his new wife with her parents in Amesbury, Massachusetts, he subsequently returned to New York in 1933, in the midst of the Great Depression. "I was 23, I carried a mass of drawings, and I had nearly five dollars in my pocket. People were sleeping in alleys then, willing to work at anything." There he met Ham Fisher, who hired him to ghost on Joe Palooka. During one of Fisher's extended vacations, Capp's Joe Palooka story arc introduced a stupid, coarse, oafish mountaineer named "Big Leviticus", a crude prototype. (Leviticus was much closer to Capp's later villains Lem and Luke Scragg than to the much more appealing and innocent Li'l Abner.)

Also during this period, Capp was working at night on samples for the strip that eventually became Li'l Abner. He based his cast of characters on the authentic mountain-dwellers he met while hitchhiking through rural West Virginia and the Cumberland Valley as a teenager. (This would have been before the Tennessee Valley Authority Act of 1933 began the years-long process of bringing basic utilities like electricity and running water to the region.) Leaving Joe Palooka, Capp sold Li'l Abner to United Feature Syndicate (later known as United Media). The feature was launched on Monday, August 13, 1934, in eight North American newspapers—including the New York Mirror—and was an immediate success. Alfred G. Caplin eventually became "Al Capp" because the syndicate felt the original would not fit in a cartoon frame. Capp had his name changed legally in 1949.

His younger brother, Elliot Caplin, also became a comic strip writer, best known for co-creating the soap opera strip The Heart of Juliet Jones with artist Stan Drake and conceiving the comic strip character Broom-Hilda with cartoonist Russell Myers. Elliot authored several off-Broadway plays, including A Nickel for Picasso (1981), which was based on and dedicated to his mother and his famous brother.

== Li'l Abner ==
What began as a hillbilly burlesque soon evolved into one of the most imaginative, popular, and well-drawn strips of the twentieth century. Featuring vividly outlandish characters, bizarre situations, and equal parts suspense, slapstick, irony, satire, black humor, and biting social commentary, Li'l Abner is considered a classic of the genre. The comic strip stars Li'l Abner Yokum—the simple-minded, loutish but good-natured, and eternally innocent hayseed who lives with his parents—scrawny but superhuman Mammy Yokum, and shiftless, childlike Pappy Yokum.

"Yokum" was a combination of yokel and hokum, although Capp established a deeper meaning for the name during a series of visits around 1965–1970 with comics historians George E. Turner and Michael H. Price:

It's phonetic Hebrew—that's what it is, all right—and that's what I was getting at with the name Yokum, more so than any attempt to sound hickish. That was a fortunate coincidence, of course, that the name should pack a backwoods connotation. But it's a godly conceit, really, playing off a godly name—Joachim means 'God's determination', something like that—that also happens to have a rustic ring to it.

The Yokums live in the backwater hamlet of Dogpatch, Kentucky. (Capp originally specified the state but then avoided it, perhaps to maintain the strip's presence in Kentucky newspapers.) Described by its creator as "an average stone-age community", Dogpatch mostly consists of hopelessly ramshackle log cabins, pine trees, "tarnip" fields, and "hawg" wallows. Whatever energy Abner had went into evading the marital goals of Daisy Mae Scragg, his sexy, well-endowed, but virtuous girlfriend, until Capp finally gave in to reader pressure and allowed the couple to marry. This newsworthy event made the cover of Life on March 31, 1952.

Capp filled his comic strip with an assortment of iconic characters, including Marryin' Sam, Hairless Joe, Lonesome Polecat, Evil-Eye Fleegle, General Bullmoose, Lena the Hyena, Senator Jack S. Phogbound (Capp's caricature of the anti-New Deal Dixiecrats), the (shudder!) Scraggs, Available Jones, Nightmare Alice, Earthquake McGoon, Fearless Fosdick (in a strip within the strip) and a host of others. Especially notable, certainly from a G.I. point of view, are the famous full-figured women—Daisy Mae, Wolf Gal, Stupefyin' Jones, and Moonbeam McSwine (a caricature of his wife Catherine, aside from the dirt)—all of whom found their way onto the nose art of bomber planes during World War II and the Korean War. Perhaps Capp's most popular creations were the Shmoos, creatures whose incredible usefulness and generous nature made them a threat to civilization as we know it.

Another famous character was Joe Btfsplk, who wants to be a loving friend but is "the world's worst jinx", bringing bad luck to all those nearby. Btfsplk (his name is "pronounced" by simply blowing a "raspberry" or Bronx cheer) always has an iconic dark cloud over his head.

Dogpatch residents regularly combat the likes of city slickers, business tycoons, government officials, and intellectuals with their homespun simplicity. Situations often take the characters to other destinations, including New York City, Washington, D.C., Hollywood, tropical islands, the moon, Mars, and some purely fanciful worlds of Capp's invention, including El Passionato, Kigmyland, The Republic of Crumbumbo, Skunk Hollow, The Valley of the Shmoon, Planets Pincus Number 2 and 7, and a miserable frozen wasteland known as Lower Slobbovia, a pointedly political satire of backward nations and foreign diplomacy that remains a contemporary reference.

According to cultural historian Anthony Harkins:

Indeed, Li'l Abner incorporates such a panoply of characters and ideas that it defies summary. Yet though Capp's storylines often wandered far afield, his hillbilly setting remained a central touchstone, serving both as a microcosm and a distorting carnival mirror of broader American society.

The strip's popularity grew from an original eight papers to eventually more than 900. At its peak, Li'l Abner was estimated to have been read daily in the United States by 60 to 70 million people (the U.S. population at the time was only 180 million), with adult readers far outnumbering children. Many communities, high schools, and colleges staged Sadie Hawkins dances patterned after the similar annual event in the strip.

Li'l Abner has one odd design quirk that has puzzled readers for decades: the part in his hair always faces the viewer, no matter which direction Abner is facing. In response to the question "Which side does Abner part his hair on?", Capp would answer: "Both." Capp said he finally found the right "look" for Li'l Abner with Henry Fonda's character Dave Tolliver in The Trail of the Lonesome Pine (1936).

In later years, Capp always claimed to have effectively created the miniskirt, when he first put one on Daisy Mae in the 1930s.

== Parodies, toppers, and alternate strips ==
Li'l Abner also features a comic strip-within-the-strip: Fearless Fosdick is a parody of Chester Gould's Dick Tracy. It first appeared in 1942, and it proved so popular that it ran intermittently during the next 35 years. Gould was parodied personally in the series as cartoonist "Lester Gooch"—the diminutive, much-harassed and occasionally deranged "creator" of Fosdick. The style of the Fosdick sequences closely mimics Tracy, including the urban setting, the outrageous villains, the galloping mortality rate, the crosshatched shadows, and even the lettering style. In 1952, Fosdick was the star of his own short-lived puppet show on NBC, featuring the Mary Chase marionettes.

Besides Dick Tracy, Capp parodied many other comic strips in Li'l Abner—including Steve Canyon, Superman (at least twice; first as "Jack Jawbreaker" in 1947, and again in 1966 as "Chickensouperman"), Mary Worth as "Mary Worm", Peanuts (in 1968, with "Peewee", a parody of Charlie Brown, and "Croopy", a parody of Snoopy, drawn by "Bedley Damp", a parody of Charles Schulz), Rex Morgan, M.D., Little Annie Rooney, and Little Orphan Annie (in which Punjab became "Punjbag", an oleaginous slob). Fearless Fosdick—and Capp's other spoofs such as "Little Fanny Gooney" (1952) and "Jack Jawbreaker"—were almost certainly an early inspiration for Harvey Kurtzman's Mad Magazine, which began in 1952 as a comic book that specifically parodied other comics in the same distinctive style and subversive manner.

Capp also lampooned popular recording idols of the day, including Elvis Presley ("Hawg McCall", 1957), Liberace ("Loverboynik", 1956), the Beatles ("the Beasties", 1964)—and in 1944, Frank Sinatra. "Sinatra was the first great public figure I ever wrote about," Capp once said. "I called him 'Hal Fascinatra.' I remember my news syndicate was so worried about what his reaction might be, and we were all surprised when he telephoned and told me how thrilled he was with it. He always made it a point to send me champagne whenever he happened to see me in a restaurant ..." (from Frank Sinatra, My Father by Nancy Sinatra, 1985). On the other hand, Liberace was "cut to the quick" over Loverboynik, according to Capp, and even threatened legal action—as would Joan Baez later, over "Joanie Phoanie" in 1967.

Capp was just as likely to parody himself; his self-caricature made frequent, tongue-in-cheek appearances in Li'l Abner. The gag was often at his own expense, as in the above 1951 sequence showing Capp's interaction with "fans" (see excerpt), or in his 1955 Disneyland parody, "Hal Yappland". Just about anything could be a target for Capp's satire—in one storyline Li'l Abner is revealed to be the missing link between ape and man. In another, the search is on in Dogpatch for a pair of missing socks knitted by the first president of the United States.

In addition to creating Li'l Abner, Capp also co-created two other newspaper strips: Abbie an' Slats with magazine illustrator Raeburn van Buren in 1937, and Long Sam with cartoonist Bob Lubbers in 1954, as well as the Sunday "topper" strips Washable Jones, Small Fry (a.k.a. Small Change), and Advice fo' Chillun.

== Critical recognition ==
According to comics historian Coulton Waugh, a 1947 poll of newspaper readers who claimed they ignored the comics page altogether revealed that many confessed to making a single exception: Li'l Abner. "When Li'l Abner made its debut in 1934, the vast majority of comic strips were designed chiefly to amuse or thrill their readers. Capp turned that world upside-down by routinely injecting politics and social commentary into Li'l Abner. The strip was the first to regularly introduce characters and story lines having nothing to do with the nominal stars of the strip. The technique—as invigorating as it was unorthodox—was later adopted by cartoonists such as Walt Kelly [Pogo] and Garry Trudeau [Doonesbury]", wrote comic strip historian Rick Marschall. According to Marschall, Li'l Abner gradually evolved into a broad satire of human nature. In his book America's Great Comic Strip Artists (1989), Marschall's analysis revealed a decidedly misanthropic subtext.

Over the years, Li'l Abner has been adapted to radio, animated cartoons, stage production, motion pictures, and television. Capp has been compared, at various times, to Mark Twain, Dostoevski, Jonathan Swift, Laurence Sterne, and Rabelais. Fans of the strip ranged from novelist John Steinbeck—who called Capp "possibly the best writer in the world today" in 1953 and even earnestly recommended him for the Nobel Prize in literature—to media critic and theorist Marshall McLuhan, who considered Capp "the only robust satirical force in American life". John Updike, comparing Abner to a "hillbilly Candide", added that the strip's "richness of social and philosophical commentary approached the Voltairean". Charlie Chaplin, William F. Buckley, Al Hirschfeld, Harpo Marx, Russ Meyer, John Kenneth Galbraith, Ralph Bakshi, Shel Silverstein, Hugh Downs, Gene Shalit, Frank Cho, Daniel Clowes, and (reportedly) even Queen Elizabeth II have confessed to being fans of Li'l Abner.

Li'l Abner was also the subject of the first book-length scholarly assessment of an American comic strip ever published. Li'l Abner: A Study in American Satire by Arthur Asa Berger (Twayne, 1969) contained serious analyses of Capp's narrative technique, his use of dialogue, self-caricature, and grotesquerie, the place of Li'l Abner in American satire, and the significance of social criticism and the graphic image. "One of the few strips ever taken seriously by students of American culture," wrote Professor Berger, "Li'l Abner is worth studying ... because of Capp's imagination and artistry, and because of the strip's very obvious social relevance." It was reprinted by the University Press of Mississippi in 1994.

== The 1940s and 1950s ==
Al Capp drew his own autobiography, the 34-page Al Capp by Li'l Abner (1946), that was distributed to returning World War II amputee veterans.

During World War II and for many years afterward, Capp worked tirelessly going to hospitals to entertain patients, especially to cheer recent amputees and explain to them that the loss of a limb did not mean an end to a happy and productive life. Making no secret of his own disability, Capp openly joked about his prosthetic leg his whole life. In 1946, Capp created a special full-color comic book, Al Capp by Li'l Abner, to be distributed by the Red Cross to encourage the thousands of amputee veterans returning from the war. Capp also was involved with the Sister Kenny Foundation, which pioneered new treatments for polio in the 1940s. Serving in his capacity as honorary chairman, Capp made public appearances on its behalf for years, contributed free artwork for its annual fundraising appeals, and entertained disabled and paraplegic children in children's hospitals with inspirational pep talks, humorous stories, and sketches.

In 1940, an RKO movie adaptation starred Granville Owen (later known as Jeff York) as Li'l Abner, with Buster Keaton taking the role of Lonesome Polecat, and featuring a title song with lyrics by Milton Berle. A successful musical comedy adaptation of the strip opened on Broadway at the St. James Theater on November 15, 1956, and had a long run of 693 performances, followed by a nationwide tour. The stage musical, with music and lyrics by Gene de Paul and Johnny Mercer, was adapted into a Technicolor motion picture at Paramount in 1959 by producer Norman Panama and director Melvin Frank, with a score by Nelson Riddle. Several performers repeated their Broadway roles in the film, most memorably Julie Newmar as Stupefyin' Jones and Stubby Kaye as Marryin' Sam.

Other highlights of that decade included the 1942 debut of Fearless Fosdick as Abner's "ideel" (hero); the 1946 Lena the Hyena Contest, in which a hideous Lower Slobbovian gal was ultimately revealed in the harrowing winning entry (as judged by Frank Sinatra, Boris Karloff, and Salvador Dalí) drawn by noted cartoonist Basil Wolverton; and an ill-fated Sunday parody of Gone With the Wind that aroused anger and legal threats from author Margaret Mitchell, and led to a printed apology within the strip. In October 1947, Li'l Abner met Rockwell P. Squeezeblood, head of the abusive and corrupt Squeezeblood Comic Strip Syndicate. The resulting sequence, "Jack Jawbreaker Fights Crime!", was a devastating satire of Jerry Siegel and Joe Shuster's notorious exploitation by DC Comics over Superman. It was later reprinted in The World of Li'l Abner (1953). (Siegel and Shuster had earlier poked fun at Capp in a Superman story in Action Comics #55, December 1942, in which a cartoonist named "Al Hatt" invents a comic strip featuring the hillbilly "Tiny Rufe".)

In 1947, Capp earned a Newsweek cover story. That same year the New Yorker's profile on him was so long that it ran in consecutive issues. In 1948, Capp reached a creative peak with the introduction of the Shmoos, lovable and innocent fantasy creatures who reproduced at amazing speed and brought so many benefits that, ironically, the world economy was endangered. The much-copied storyline was a parable that was metaphorically interpreted in many different ways at the outset of the Cold War.

Following his close friend Milton Caniff's lead (with Steve Canyon), Capp had recently fought a successful battle with the syndicate to gain complete ownership of his feature when the Shmoos debuted. As a result, he reaped enormous financial rewards from the unexpected (and almost unprecedented) merchandising phenomenon that followed. As in the strip, Shmoos suddenly appeared to be everywhere in 1949 and 1950—including a Time cover story. A paperback collection of the original sequence, The Life and Times of the Shmoo, became a bestseller for Simon & Schuster. Shmoo dolls, clocks, watches, jewelry, earmuffs, wallpaper, fishing lures, air fresheners, soap, ice cream, balloons, ashtrays, comic books, records, sheet music, toys, games, Halloween masks, salt and pepper shakers, decals, pinbacks, tumblers, coin banks, greeting cards, planters, neckties, suspenders, belts, curtains, fountain pens, and other Shmoo paraphernalia were produced. A garment factory in Baltimore turned out a whole line of Shmoo apparel, including "Shmooveralls". The original sequence and its 1959 sequel The Return of the Shmoo have been collected in print many times since, most recently in 2011, always to high sales figures. The Shmoos later had their own animated television series.

Capp followed this success with other allegorical fantasy critters, including the aboriginal and masochistic "Kigmies", who craved abuse (a story that began as a veiled comment on racial and religious oppression), the dreaded "Nogoodniks" (or bad shmoos), and the irresistible "Bald Iggle", a guileless creature whose sad-eyed countenance compelled involuntary truthfulness—with predictably disastrous results.

Li'l Abner was censored for the first time, but not the last, in September 1947 and was pulled from papers by Scripps-Howard. The controversy, as reported in Time, centered on Capp's portrayal of the United States Senate. Edward Leech of Scripps said, "We don't think it is good editing or sound citizenship to picture the Senate as an assemblage of freaks and crooks ... boobs and undesirables." Capp criticized Senator Joseph McCarthy in 1954, calling him a "poet". "He uses poetic license to try to create the beautifully ordered world of good guys and bad guys that he wants," said Capp. "He seems at his best when terrifying the helpless and naïve."

Capp received the National Cartoonists Society's Billy DeBeck Memorial Award in 1947 for Cartoonist of the Year. (When the award name was changed in 1954, Capp also retroactively received a Reuben statuette.) He was an outspoken pioneer in favor of diversifying the NCS by admitting women cartoonists. Originally, the Society had disallowed female members. Capp briefly resigned his membership in 1949 to protest their refusal of admission to Hilda Terry, creator of the comic strip Teena. According to Tom Roberts, author of Alex Raymond: His Life and Art (2007), Capp delivered a stirring speech that was instrumental in changing those rules. The NCS finally accepted female members the following year. In December 1952, Capp published an article in Real magazine entitled "The REAL Powers in America" that further challenged the conventional attitudes of the day: "The real powers in America are women—the wives and sweethearts behind the masculine dummies...."

Highlights of the 1950s included the much-heralded marriage of Abner and Daisy Mae in 1952, the birth of their son "Honest Abe" Yokum in 1953, and in 1954 the introduction of Abner's enormous, long-lost kid brother Tiny Yokum, who filled Abner's place as a bachelor in the annual Sadie Hawkins Day race. In 1952, Capp and his characters graced the covers of both Life and TV Guide. The year 1956 saw the debut of Bald Iggle, considered by some Abner enthusiasts to be the creative high point of the strip, as well as Mammy's revelatory encounter with the "Square Eyes" Family—Capp's thinly veiled appeal for racial tolerance. (This fable-like story was collected into an educational comic book called Mammy Yokum and the Great Dogpatch Mystery! and distributed by the Anti-Defamation League of B'nai B'rith later that year.) Two years later, Capp's studio issued Martin Luther King and the Montgomery Story, a biographical comic book distributed by the Fellowship of Reconciliation.

Often, Capp had parodied corporate greed—pork tycoon J. Roaringham Fatback had figured prominently in wiping out the Shmoos. But in 1952, when General Motors president Charles E. Wilson, nominated for a cabinet post, told Congress "...what was good for the country was good for General Motors and vice versa", he inspired one of Capp's greatest satires—the introduction of General Bullmoose, the robust, ruthless, and ageless business tycoon. The blustering Bullmoose, who seemed to own and control nearly everything, justified his far-reaching and mercenary excesses by saying "What's good for General Bullmoose is good for the USA!" Bullmoose's corrupt interests were often pitted against those of the pathetic Lower Slobbovians in a classic mismatch of "haves" versus "have-nots". This character, along with the Shmoos, helped cement Capp's favor with the Left, and increased their outrage a decade later when Capp, a former Franklin D. Roosevelt liberal, switched targets. Nonetheless, General Bullmoose continued to appear, undaunted and unredeemed, during the strip's final right-wing phase and into the 1970s.

== Feud with Ham Fisher ==
After Capp quit his ghosting job on Ham Fisher's Joe Palooka in 1934 to launch his own strip, Fisher badmouthed him to colleagues and editors, claiming that Capp had "stolen" his idea. For years, Fisher brought the characters back to his strip, billing them as "The ORIGINAL Hillbilly Characters" and advising readers not to be "fooled by imitations". (In fact, Fisher's brutish hillbilly character—Big Leviticus, created by Capp in Fisher's absence—bore little resemblance to Li'l Abner.) According to a November 1950 Time article, "Capp parted from Fisher with a definite impression, (to put it mildly) that he had been underpaid and unappreciated. Fisher, a man of Roman self esteem, considered Capp an ingrate and a whippersnapper, and watched his rise to fame with unfeigned horror."

"Fisher repeatedly brought Leviticus and his clan back, claiming their primacy as comics' first hillbilly family – but he was missing the point. It wasn't the setting that made Capp's strip such a huge success. It was Capp's finely tuned sense of the absurd, his ability to milk an outrageous situation for every laugh in it and then, impossibly, to squeeze even more laughs from it, that found such favor with the public," (from Don Markstein's Toonopedia).

The Capp-Fisher feud was well known in cartooning circles, and it grew more personal as Capp's strip eclipsed Joe Palooka in popularity. Fisher hired away Capp's top assistant, Moe Leff. After Fisher underwent plastic surgery, Capp included a racehorse in Li'l Abner named "Ham's Nose-Bob". In 1950, Capp introduced a cartoonist character named "Happy Vermin"—a caricature of Fisher—who hired Abner to draw his comic strip in a dimly lit closet (after sacking his previous "temporary" assistant of 20 years, who had been cut off from all his friends in the process). Instead of using Vermin's tired characters, Abner inventively peopled the strip with hillbillies. A bighearted Vermin told his slaving assistant: "I'm proud of having created these characters!! They'll make millions for me!! And if they do – I'll get you a new light bulb!!"

Traveling in the same social circles, the two men engaged in a 20-year mutual vendetta, as described by the New York Daily News in 1998: "They crossed paths often, in the midtown watering holes and at National Cartoonists Society banquets, and the city's gossip columns were full of their snarling public donnybrooks." In 1950, Capp wrote a nasty article for The Atlantic, entitled "I Remember Monster". The article recounted Capp's days working for an unnamed "benefactor" with a miserly, swinish personality, who Capp claimed was a never-ending source of inspiration when it came time to create a new unregenerate villain for his comic strip. The thinly veiled boss was understood to be Ham Fisher.

Fisher retaliated, doctoring photostats of Li'l Abner and falsely accusing Capp of sneaking obscenities into his comic strip. Fisher submitted examples of Li'l Abner to Capp's syndicate and to the New York courts, in which Fisher had identified pornographic images that were hidden in the background art. However, the X-rated material had been drawn there by Fisher. Capp was able to refute the accusation by simply showing the original artwork.

In 1954, when Capp was applying for a Boston television license, the Federal Communications Commission (FCC) received an anonymous packet of pornographic Li'l Abner drawings. The National Cartoonists Society (NCS) convened an ethics hearing, and Fisher was expelled for the forgery from the same organization that he had helped found; Fisher's scheme had backfired in spectacular fashion. Around the same time, his mansion in Wisconsin was destroyed by a storm. On December 27, 1955, Fisher committed suicide in his studio. The feud and Fisher's suicide were used as the basis for a lurid, highly fictionalized murder mystery, Strip for Murder by Max Allan Collins.

Another "feud" seemed to be looming when, in one run of Sunday strips in 1957, Capp lampooned the comic strip Mary Worth as "Mary Worm". The title character was depicted as a nosy, interfering busybody. Allen Saunders, the creator of the Mary Worth strip, returned Capp's fire with the introduction of the character "Hal Rapp", a foul-tempered, ill-mannered, and (ironically, as Capp was a teetotaler) inebriated cartoonist. Later, the "feud" was revealed to be a collaborative hoax that Capp and his longtime pal Saunders had cooked up together. The Capp-Saunders "feud" fooled both editors and readers, generated plenty of free publicity for both strips—and Capp and Saunders had a good laugh when all was revealed.

== Production methods ==
Like many cartoonists, Capp made extensive use of assistants (notably Andy Amato, Harvey Curtis, Walter Johnson, and Frank Frazetta). During the extended peak of the strip, the workload grew to include advertising, merchandising, promotional work, public service comics, and other specialty work—in addition to the regular six dailies and one Sunday strip per week. From the early 1940s to the late 1950s, there were scores of Sunday strip-style magazine ads for Cream of Wheat using the Abner characters, and in the 1950s, Fearless Fosdick became a spokesman for Wildroot Cream-Oil hair tonic in a series of daily strip-style print ads. The characters also sold chainsaws, underwear, ties, detergent, candy, soft drinks—including a licensed version of Capp's moonshine creation, Kickapoo Joy Juice—and General Electric and Procter & Gamble products, all requiring special artwork.

No matter how much help he had, Capp insisted on his drawing and inking the characters' faces and hands—especially of Abner and Daisy Mae—and his distinctive touch is often discernible. "He had the touch," Frazetta said of Capp in 2008. "He knew how to take an otherwise ordinary drawing and really make it pop. I'll never knock his talent."

As is usual with collaborative efforts in comic strips, his name was the only one credited— although, sensitive to his own experience working on Joe Palooka, Capp frequently drew attention to his assistants in interviews and publicity pieces. A 1950 cover story in Time even included photographs of two of his employees, whose roles in the production were detailed by Capp. Ironically, this highly irregular policy (along with the subsequent fame of Frank Frazetta) has led to the misconception that his strip was "ghosted" by other hands. The production of Li'l Abner has been well documented, however. In point of fact, Capp maintained creative control over every stage of production for virtually the entire run of the strip. Capp originated the stories, wrote the dialogue, designed the major characters, rough penciled the preliminary staging and action of each panel, oversaw the finished pencils, and drew and inked the hands and faces of the characters. Frazetta authority David Winiewicz described the everyday working mode of operation in Li'l Abner Dailies: 1954 Volume 20 (Kitchen Sink, 1994):

By the time Frazetta began working on the strip, the work of producing Li'l Abner was too much for one person. Capp had a group of assistants who he taught to reproduce his distinctive individual style, working under his direct supervision. Actual production of the strip began with a rough layout in pencil done by Al Capp, from Capp's script or a co-authored script, and the page passed to Andy Amato and Walter Johnson. Amato inked the figures, then Johnson added backgrounds and any mechanical objects. Harvey Curtis was responsible for the lettering and also shared inking duties with Amato ... To make sure that the work stayed true to his style, the final touches were added by Capp himself. He enjoyed adding a distinctive glint to an eye or an idiosyncratic contortion to a character's face. The finished strip was truly an ensemble effort, a skillful blending of talents.

There was also a separate line of comic book titles published by the Caplin family-owned Toby Press, including Shmoo Comics featuring Washable Jones. Cartoonist Mell Lazarus, creator of Miss Peach and Momma, wrote a comic novel in 1963 entitled The Boss Is Crazy, Too which was partly inspired by his apprenticeship days working with Capp and his brother Elliot at Toby. In a seminar at the Charles Schulz Museum on November 8, 2008, Lazarus called his experience at Toby "the five funniest years of my life". Lazarus went on to cite Capp as one of the "four essentials" in the field of newspaper cartoonists, along with Walt Kelly, Charles Schulz, and Milton Caniff.

Capp detailed his approach to writing and drawing the stories in an instructional course book for the Famous Artists School, beginning in 1956. In 1959, Capp recorded and released an album for Folkways Records (now owned by the Smithsonian) on which he identified and described "The Mechanics of the Comic Strip".

Frazetta, later famous as a fantasy artist, assisted on the strip from 1954 to December 1961. Fascinated by Frazetta's abilities, Capp initially gave him a free hand in an extended daily sequence (about a biker named "Frankie", a caricature of Frazetta) to experiment with the basic look of the strip by adding a bit more realism and detail (particularly to the inking). After editors complained about the stylistic changes, the strip's previous look was restored. During most of his tenure with Capp, Frazetta's primary responsibility—along with various specialty art, such as a series of Li'l Abner greeting cards—was tight-penciling the Sunday pages from studio roughs. This work was collected by Dark Horse Comics in a four-volume hardcover series entitled Al Capp's Li'l Abner: The Frazetta Years. In 1961, Capp, complaining of declining revenue, wanted to have Frazetta continue with a 50% pay cut. "[Capp] said he would cut the salary in half. Goodbye. That was that. I said goodbye," (from Frazetta: Painting with Fire). However, Frazetta returned briefly a few years later to draw a public service comic book called Li'l Abner and the Creatures from Drop-Outer Space, distributed by the Job Corps in 1965.

== Personality ==
Although he was often considered a difficult person, some acquaintances of Capp have stressed that the cartoonist also had a sensitive side. In 1973, upon learning that 12-year-old Ted Kennedy Jr., the son of his political rival Ted Kennedy Sr., had his right leg amputated, Capp wrote the boy an encouraging letter that gave candid advice about dealing with the loss of a limb, which Capp himself had experienced as a boy. One of Capp's grandchildren recalls that at one point, tears were streaming down the cartoonist's cheeks while he was watching a documentary about the Jonestown massacre. Capp gave money anonymously to charities and "people in need" at various points in his life.

== Sexual harassment and assault claims ==
Two biographies, one of Grace Kelly and the other of Goldie Hawn, describe Capp as trying to force the younger women to have sex with him. While no firsthand allegation has ever surfaced regarding Kelly, in her autobiography, Hawn stated that Capp sexually propositioned her on a casting couch and exposed himself to her when she was 19 years old. When she refused his advances, Capp became angry and told her that she was "never gonna make anything in your life" and that she should "go and marry a Jewish dentist. You'll never get anywhere in this business."

In 1971, investigative journalist Jack Anderson wrote that Capp had exposed his genitals to four female students at the University of Alabama.

In 1972, after an incident at the University of Wisconsin–Eau Claire, Capp was arrested. He pleaded guilty to a charge of attempted adultery, while charges of indecent exposure and sodomy were dropped. He was fined US$500 (equivalent to $3,848 in 2025).

In 2019, Jean Kilbourne was inspired by the MeToo movement to publish in Hogan's Alley her own experience of being groped and sexually solicited by Al Capp while doing freelance writing and research work for him in contemplation of a permanent job in 1967.

== Public service works ==
Capp provided specialty artwork for civic groups, government agencies, and charitable or nonprofit organizations, spanning several decades. The following titles are all single-issue, educational comic books and pamphlets produced for various public services:

- Al Capp by Li'l Abner— Public service giveaway issued by the Red Cross (1946)
- Yo' Bets Yo' Life!— Public service giveaway issued by the U.S. Army (c. 1950)
- Li'l Abner Joins the Navy— Public service giveaway issued by the Dept. of the Navy (1950)
- Fearless Fosdick and the Case of the Red Feather— Public service giveaway issued by Red Feather Services, a forerunner of United Way (1951)
- The Youth You Supervise— Public service giveaway issued by the U.S. Department of Labor (1956)
- Mammy Yokum and the Great Dogpatch Mystery!— Public service giveaway issued by the Anti-Defamation League of B'nai B'rith (1956)
- Operation: Survival!— Public service giveaway issued by the Dept. of Civil Defense (1957)
- Natural Disasters!— Public service giveaway issued by the Department of Civil Defense (1957)
- Martin Luther King and the Montgomery Story— Public service giveaway issued by The Fellowship of Reconciliation (1958)
- Li'l Abner and the Creatures from Drop-Outer Space— Public service giveaway issued by the Job Corps (1965)
- Statue of Josiah Flintabattey Flonatin— design of a statue for the northern Manitoba city of Flin Flon's mascot City of Flin Flon's tribute (1962)

In addition, Dogpatch characters were used in national campaigns for the U.S. Treasury, the Cancer Foundation, the March of Dimes, the National Heart Fund, the Sister Kenny Foundation, the Boy Scouts of America, Community Chest, the National Reading Council, Minnesota Tuberculosis and Health Association, Christmas Seals, the National Amputation Foundation, and Disabled American Veterans, among others.

== Public figure ==
In the Golden Age of the American comic strip, successful cartoonists received a great deal of attention; their professional and private lives were reported in the press, and their celebrity was often nearly sufficient to rival their creations. As Li'l Abner reached its peak years, and following the success of the Shmoos and other high moments in his work, Al Capp achieved a public profile that is still unparalleled in his profession, and arguably exceeded the fame of his strip. "Capp was the best known, most influential and most controversial cartoonist of his era," writes publisher (and leading Shmoo collector) Denis Kitchen. "His personal celebrity transcended comics, reaching the public and influencing the culture in a variety of media. For many years he simultaneously produced the daily strip, a weekly syndicated newspaper column, and a 500-station radio program ..." He ran the Boston Summer Theatre with The Phantom cartoonist Lee Falk, bringing in Hollywood actors such as Mae West, Melvyn Douglas, and Claude Rains to star in their live productions. He even briefly considered running for a Massachusetts Senate seat. Vice President Spiro Agnew urged Capp to run in the Democratic Party Massachusetts primary in 1970 against Ted Kennedy, but Capp ultimately declined. (He did, however, donate his services as a speaker at a $100-a-plate fundraiser for Republican Congressman Jack Kemp.)

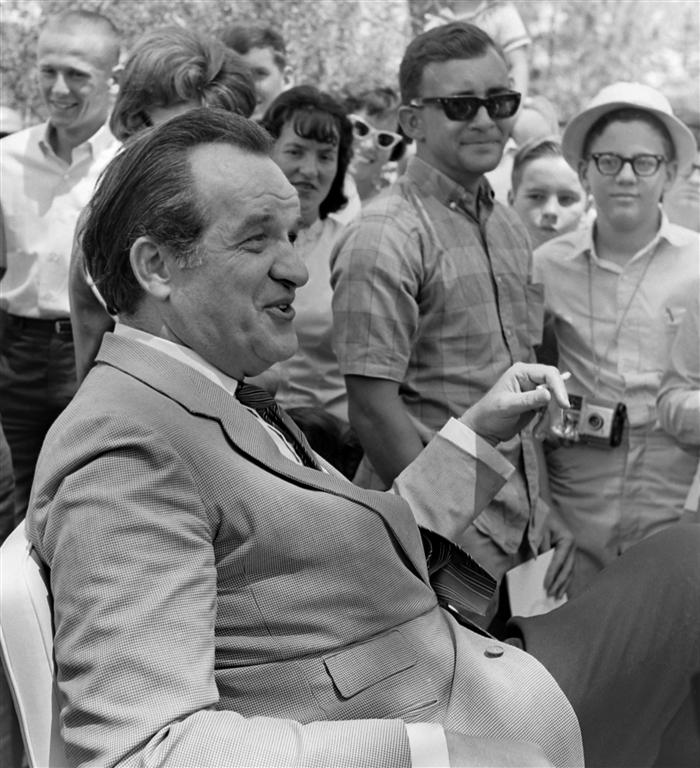
Al Capp at 1966 Art Festival in Fort Walton Beach, Florida

Besides his use of the comic strip to voice his opinions and display his humor, Capp was a popular guest speaker at universities, and on radio and television. He remains the only cartoonist to be embraced by television; no other comic artist to date has come close to Capp's televised exposure. Capp appeared as a regular on The Author Meets the Critics (1948–1954) and made regular, weekly appearances on Today in 1953. He was also a periodic panelist on ABC and NBC's Who Said That? (1948–1955), and co-hosted DuMont's What's the Story? (1953). Between 1952 and 1972, he hosted at least five television shows–three different talk shows called The Al Capp Show (1952 and 1968) and Al Capp (1971–1972), Al Capp's America (a live "chalk talk", with Capp providing a barbed commentary while sketching cartoons, 1954), and a CBS game show called Anyone Can Win (1953). He also hosted similar vehicles on the radio—and was a familiar celebrity guest on various other broadcast programs, including NBC Radio's long-running Monitor with its famous Monitor Beacon audio signature, as a commentator dubbed "An expert of nothing with opinions on everything."

His frequent appearances on NBC's The Tonight Show spanned three emcees (Steve Allen, Jack Paar, and Johnny Carson), from the 1950s to the 1970s. One memorable story, as recounted to Johnny Carson, was about his meeting with then-President Dwight D. Eisenhower. As Capp was ushered into the Oval Office, his prosthetic leg suddenly collapsed into a pile of disengaged parts and hinges on the floor. The President immediately turned to an aide and said, "Call Walter Reed (Hospital), or maybe Bethesda," to which Capp replied, "Hell no, just call a good local mechanic!" (Capp also spoofed Carson in his strip, in a 1970 episode called "The Tommy Wholesome Show".)

Capp portrayed himself in a cameo role in the Bob Hope film That Certain Feeling, for which he also provided promotional art. He was interviewed live on Person to Person on November 27, 1959, by host Charles Collingwood. He also appeared as himself on The Ed Sullivan Show, Sid Caesar's Your Show of Shows, The Red Skelton Show, The Merv Griffin Show, The Mike Douglas Show, and guested on Ralph Edwards' This Is Your Life on February 12, 1961, with honoree Peter Palmer (the actor who played Li'l Abner in the Paramount film). Capp also freelanced very successfully as a magazine writer and newspaper columnist, in a wide variety of publications including Life, Show, Pageant, The Atlantic, Esquire, Coronet, and The Saturday Evening Post. Capp was impersonated by comedians Rich Little and David Frye. Although Capp's endorsement activities never rivaled Li'l Abner's or Fearless Fosdick's, he was a celebrity spokesman in print ads for Sheaffer Snorkel fountain pens (along with colleagues and close friends Milton Caniff and Walt Kelly), and—with an irony that became apparent later—a brand of cigarettes (Chesterfield).

Capp resumed visiting war amputees during the Korean War and Vietnam War. He toured Vietnam with the USO, entertaining troops along with Art Buchwald and George Plimpton. He served as chairman of the Cartoonists' Committee in President Dwight D. Eisenhower's People-to-People program in 1954 (although Capp had supported Adlai Stevenson for president in 1952 and 1956), which was organized to promote Savings bonds for the U.S. Treasury. Capp had earlier provided the Shmoo for a special Children's Savings Bond in 1949, accompanying President Harry S. Truman at the bond's unveiling ceremony. During the Soviet Union's blockade of West Berlin in 1948, the commanders of the Berlin airlift had cabled Capp, requesting inflatable shmoos as part of "Operation: Little Vittles". Candy-filled shmoos were air-dropped to hungry West Berliners by America's 17th Military Airport Squadron during the humanitarian effort. "When the candy-chocked shmoos were dropped, a near-riot resulted," (reported in Newsweek—October 11, 1948).

In addition to his public service work for charitable organizations for disabled people, Capp also served on the National Reading Council, which was organized to combat illiteracy. He published a column ("Wrong Turn Onto Sesame Street") challenging federally funded public television endowments in favor of educational comics—which, according to Capp, "didn't cost a dime in taxes and never had. I pointed out that a kid could enjoy Sesame Street without learning how to read, but he couldn't enjoy comic strips unless he could read; and that a smaller investment in getting kids to read by supplying them with educational matter in such reading form might make better sense."

Capp's academic interests included being one of nineteen original "Trustees and Advisors" for "Endicott, Junior College for Young Woman", located in Pride's Crossing (Beverly), Massachusetts, which was founded in 1939. Al Capp is listed in the 1942 Mingotide Yearbook, representing the first graduating class from what is now the 4-year school known as Endicott College. The yearbook entry includes his credential as a "Cartoonist for United Feature Syndicate" and a resident of New York City.

"Comics", wrote Capp in 1970, "can be a combination of the highest quality of art and text, and many of them are." Capp produced many giveaway educational comic books and public services pamphlets, spanning several decades, for the Red Cross, the Department of Civil Defense, the Department of the Navy, the U.S. Army, the Anti-Defamation League, the Department of Labor, Community Chest (a forerunner of United Way), and the Job Corps. Capp's studio provided special artwork for various civic groups and nonprofit organizations as well. Dogpatch characters were used in national campaigns for the Cancer Foundation, the March of Dimes, the National Heart Fund, the Boy Scouts of America, Minnesota Tuberculosis and Health Association, the National Amputation Foundation, and Disabled American Veterans, among others. They were also used to help sell Christmas Seals.

In the early 1960s, Capp regularly wrote a column entitled Al Capp's Column for the newspaper The Schenectady Gazette (currently The Daily Gazette). He was the Playboy interview subject in December 1965, in a conversation conducted by Alvin Toffler. In August 1967, Capp was the narrator and host of an ABC network special called Do Blondes Have More Fun? In 1970, he was the subject of a provocative NBC documentary called This Is Al Capp.

== The 1960s and 1970s ==
Capp and his family lived in Cambridge, Massachusetts, near Harvard University, during the entire Vietnam War protest era. The turmoil that Americans were watching on their television sets was happening live—right in his own neighborhood. Campus radicals and "hippies" inevitably became one of Capp's favorite targets in the sixties. Alongside his long-established caricatures of right-wing, big business types such as General Bullmoose and J. Roaringham Fatback, Capp began spoofing counterculture icons such as Joan Baez (in the character of Joanie Phoanie, a wealthy folksinger who offers an impoverished orphanage ten thousand dollars' worth of "protest songs"). The sequence implicitly labeled Baez a limousine liberal, a charge she took to heart, as detailed years later in her 1987 autobiography, And A Voice To Sing With: A Memoir. Another target was Senator Ted Kennedy, parodied as "Senator O. Noble McGesture", resident of "Hyideelsport". The town name is a play on Hyannisport, Massachusetts, where a number of the Kennedy clan have lived.

Capp became a popular public speaker on college campuses, where he reportedly relished hecklers. He attacked militant antiwar demonstrators, both in his personal appearances and in his strip. He also satirized student political groups. The Youth International Party (YIP) and Students for a Democratic Society (SDS) emerged in Li'l Abner as "Students Wildly Indignant about Nearly Everything!" (SWINE). In an April 1969 letter to Time, Capp insisted, "The students I blast are not the dissenters, but the destroyers—the less than 4% who lock up deans in washrooms, who burn manuscripts of unpublished books, who make combination pigpens and playpens of their universities. The remaining 96% detest them as heartily as I do."

Capp's increasingly controversial remarks at his campus speeches and during television appearances cost him his semi-regular spot on the Tonight Show. His contentious public persona during this period was captured on a late sixties comedy LP called Al Capp On Campus. The album features his interaction with students at Fresno State College (now California State University, Fresno) on such topics as "sensitivity training", "humanitarianism", "abstract art" (Capp hated it), and "student protest". The cover features a cartoon drawing by Capp of wildly dressed, angry hippies carrying protest signs with slogans like "End Capp Brutality", "Abner and Daisy Mae Smoke Pot", "Capp Is Over [30, 40, 50—all crossed out] the Hill!!", and "If You Like Crap, You'll Like Capp!"

Highlights of the strip's final decades include the stories "Boomchik" (1961), in which America's international prestige is saved by Mammy Yokum, "Daisy Mae Steps Out" (1966), a female-empowering tale of Daisy's brazenly audacious "homewrecker gland", "The Lips of Marcia Perkins" (1967), a satirical, thinly veiled commentary on venereal disease and public health warnings, "Ignoble Savages" (1968), in which the Mob takes over Harvard, and "Corporal Crock" (1973), in which Bullmoose reveals his reactionary cartoon role model, in a tale of obsession and the fanatical world of comic book collecting.

The cartoonist visited John Lennon and Yoko Ono at their 1969 Bed-In for Peace in Montreal, and their testy exchange later appeared in the documentary film Imagine: John Lennon (1988). Introducing himself with the words "I'm a dreadful Neanderthal fascist. How do you do?", Capp sardonically congratulated Lennon and Ono on their Two Virgins nude album cover: "I think that everybody owes it to the world to prove they have pubic hair. You've done it, and I tell you that I applaud you for it." Following this exchange, Capp insulted Ono ("Good God, you've gotta live with that?"), and was asked to "get out" by Lennon publicist Derek Taylor. Lennon allowed him to stay, however, but the conversation had soured considerably. On Capp's exit, Lennon sang an impromptu version of his song "The Ballad of John and Yoko" with a slightly revised, but nonetheless prophetic lyric: "Christ, you know it ain't easy / You know how hard it can be / The way things are goin' / They're gonna crucify Capp! "

Despite his political conservatism in the last decade of his life, Capp is reported to have been liberal in some particular causes; he supported gay rights, and did not tolerate any attempts at homophobic jokes. He is also said to have supported Martin Luther King Jr. and the fight for racial equality in American society, although he was very sceptical of the tactics of the Black Panthers and Malcolm X.

In 1968, a theme park called Dogpatch USA opened at Marble Falls, Arkansas, based on Capp's work and with his support. The park was a popular attraction during the 1970s, but was abandoned in 1993 due to financial difficulties. By 2005, the area once devoted to a live-action facsimile of Dogpatch (including a lifesize statue in the town square of Dogpatch "founder" General Jubilation T. Cornpone) had been heavily stripped by vandals and souvenir hunters, and was slowly being reclaimed by the surrounding Arkansas wilderness.

On April 22, 1971, syndicated columnist Jack Anderson reported allegations that in February 1968 Capp had made indecent advances to four female students when he was invited to speak at the University of Alabama. Anderson and an associate confirmed that Capp was shown out of town by university police, but that the incident had been hushed up by the university to avoid negative publicity.

The following month, Capp was charged in Eau Claire, Wisconsin, in connection with another alleged incident following his April 1 lecture at the University of Wisconsin-Eau Claire. Capp was accused of propositioning a married woman in his hotel room. Although no sexual act was alleged to have resulted, the original charge included "sodomy". As part of a plea agreement, Capp pleaded guilty to the charge of "attempted adultery" (adultery was a felony in Wisconsin), and the other charges were dropped. Capp was fined $500 and court costs. In a December 1992 article for The New Yorker, Seymour Hersh reported that President Richard Nixon and Charles Colson had repeatedly discussed the Capp case in Oval Office recordings that had recently been made available by the National Archives. Nixon and Capp were on friendly terms, Hersh wrote, and Nixon and Colson had worked to find a way for Capp to run against Ted Kennedy for the U.S. Senate. "Nixon was worried about the allegations, fearing that Capp's very close links to the White House would become embarrassingly public", Hersh wrote. "The White House tapes and documents show that he and Colson discussed the issue repeatedly, and that Colson eventually reassured the president by saying that he had, in essence, fixed the case. Specifically, the president was told that one of Colson's people had gone to Wisconsin and tried to talk to the prosecutors." Colson's efforts failed, however. The Eau Claire district attorney, a Republican, refused to dismiss the attempted adultery charge. In passing sentence in February 1972, the judge rejected the D.A.'s motion that Capp agree to undergo psychiatric treatment.

The resulting publicity led to hundreds of papers dropping his comic strip, and Capp, already in failing health, withdrew from public speaking. Celebrity biographer James Spada has claimed that similar allegations were made by actress Grace Kelly. However, no firsthand allegation has ever surfaced.

"From beginning to end, Capp was acid-tongued toward the targets of his wit, intolerant of hypocrisy, and always wickedly funny. After about 40 years, however, Capp's interest in Abner waned, and this showed in the strip itself," according to Don Markstein's Toonopedia. Although Capp had used assistants on the strip practically since the beginning, in the final years his own involvement in the strip decreased. His health issues made it increasingly difficult for Capp to work, recalled his assistants. On November 13, 1977, Capp retired with an apology to his fans for the recently declining quality of the strip, which he said had been the best he could manage due to declining health. "If you have any sense of humor about your strip—and I had a sense of humor about mine—you knew that for three or four years Abner was wrong. Oh hell, it's like a fighter retiring. I stayed on longer than I should have," he admitted, adding that he couldn't breathe anymore. "When he retired Li'l Abner, newspapers ran expansive articles and television commentators talked about the passing of an era. People magazine ran a substantial feature, and even the comics-free New York Times devoted nearly a full page to the event", wrote publisher Denis Kitchen.

Capp's final years were marked by advancing illness and by family tragedy. In October 1977, one of his two daughters died; a few weeks later, a beloved granddaughter was killed in a car accident. A lifelong chain smoker, Capp died in 1979 from emphysema at his home in South Hampton, New Hampshire. Capp is buried in Mount Prospect Cemetery in Amesbury, Massachusetts. Engraved on his headstone is a stanza from Thomas Gray: The plowman homeward plods his weary way / And leaves the world to darkness and to me (from Elegy Written in a Country Churchyard, 1751).

== Legacy ==
"Neither the strip's shifting political leanings nor the slide of its final few years had any bearing on its status as a classic; and in 1995, it was recognized as such by the U.S. Postal Service", according to Toonopedia. Li'l Abner was one of 20 American comic strips included in the Comic Strip Classics series of USPS commemorative stamps. Al Capp, an inductee into the National Cartoon Museum (formerly the International Museum of Cartoon Art), is one of only 31 artists selected to their Hall of Fame. Capp was also inducted into the Will Eisner Award Hall of Fame in 2004.

Sadie Hawkins Day and double whammy are two terms attributed to Al Capp that have entered the English language. Other, less ubiquitous Cappisms include skunk works and Lower Slobbovia. The term shmoo also has entered the lexicon, defining highly technical concepts in no fewer than four separate fields of science, including the variations shmooing (a microbiological term for the "budding" process in yeast reproduction), and shmoo plot (a technical term in the field of electrical engineering). In socioeconomics, a "shmoo" refers to any generic kind of good that reproduces itself, (as opposed to "widgets" which require resources and active production). In the field of particle physics, "shmoo" refers to a high energy survey instrument, as used at the Los Alamos National Laboratory to capture subatomic cosmic ray particles emitted from the Cygnus X-3 constellation. Capp also had a knack for popularizing certain uncommon terms, such as druthers, schmooze, and nogoodnik, neatnik, etc. In his book The American Language, H.L. Mencken credits the postwar mania for adding "-nik" to the ends of adjectives to create nouns as beginning—not with beatnik or Sputnik—but earlier, in the pages of Li'l Abner.

Al Capp's life and career are the subjects of a new life-sized mural commemorating the 100th anniversary of his birth. Created by resident artist Jon P. Mooers, the mural was unveiled in downtown Amesbury on May 15, 2010. According to the Boston Globe (as reported on May 18, 2010), the town has renamed its amphitheater in the artist's honor, and is looking to develop an Al Capp Museum. Capp is also the subject of an upcoming WNET-TV American Masters documentary, The Life and Times of Al Capp, produced by his granddaughter, independent filmmaker Caitlin Manning.

Since his death in 1979, Al Capp and his work have been the subject of more than 40 books, including three biographies. Underground cartoonist and Li'l Abner expert Denis Kitchen has published, co-published, edited, or otherwise served as consultant on nearly all of them. Kitchen is currently compiling a biographical monograph on Al Capp.

At San Diego Comic-Con in July 2009, IDW announced the upcoming publication of Al Capp's Li'l Abner: The Complete Dailies and Color Sundays as part of their ongoing The Library of American Comics series. The comprehensive series, a reprinting of the entire 43-year history of Li'l Abner, spanning a projected 20 volumes, began on April 7, 2010.
