= Richard W. Dorgan =

American cartoonist (1892–1953)

- Born: September 24, 1892; San Francisco, California, U.S.
- Died: May 5, 1953 (aged 60); New York City, U.S.
- Occupation: Cartoonist
- Spouse: Amelia Jane Murray
- Children: Richard W. Dorgan, Jr.

Richard William Dorgan (September 24, 1892 – May 5, 1953) was an American cartoonist, writer, and illustrator. His first known published work appeared in The New York Call in 1913. A wide variety of his early work was published in The Broadside: A Journal for the Naval Reserve Force, 1918–1920.

He is remembered as the illustrator of Thorne Smith's first two novels, Biltmore Oswald (1918) and Out o' Luck (1919), as well as for his work as a columnist for Photoplay Magazine and newspaper artist in the 1920s and '30s.

== Biography ==
Richard William Dorgan was born in San Francisco, California, one of 11 children—six sons and five daughters—of Thomas J. and Anna R. Dorgan née Tobin. He died at Bayside, New York.

By 1910, he was living in New York City, where he studied art at the National Academy and the Art Students League. According to registration cards at the National Academy, "Dorgan of San Francisco" took life drawing classes in 1910 and 1911, and, according to records at the Art Students League, he took an illustration class from September 1912 through May 1913.

By October 1913, Dorgan was selling panel cartoons to The New York Call.

During World War I, Dorgan was a Seaman Second Class in the U.S. Naval Reserve Force, stationed at Pelham Bay, New York. He later lived in Bayside, New York, in the borough of Queens on Long Island.

On his World War I draft registration card (dated June 5, 1917), Dorgan reported his occupation as "Cartoonist."

He was married to Amelia Jane Murray (October 8, 1891 at New York City–February 20, 1970 at Chappaqua, New York). They had one son, Richard W. Dorgan, Jr. (August 13, 1921 at New York City–November 23, 1988 at Mount Kisco, New York).

=== Family ===
His brother (and oldest sibling), Thomas Aloysius "Tad" Dorgan (April 29, 1877 – May 2, 1929), was a prominent cartoonist and creator of "Indoor Sports," as well as a well-known sportswriter.

Another brother, John L. "Ike" Dorgan (April 15, 1879 – December 27, 1960), was a bookbinder, boxing manager (for Harry Ebbets and Charles Francis "Frank" Moran, known as "The Fighting Dentist"), press agent (for boxing promoter George L. "Tex" Rickard), and publicity manager for the Madison Square Garden. He was a founding partner of The Ring magazine in February 1922 and remained with this influential publication until his retirement in 1930.

A third brother, Joseph V. "Joe" Dorgan (December 25, 1894 – May 8, 1945), a cartoonist in his own right, was a Seaman Second Class in the U.S. Navy during World War I. Joe enlisted in October 1917 and was assigned to the USS SC-338 (a submarine chaser) by January 1918 at New York, where he was a member of the crew until the ship's return to New York in 1919. He kept a daily diary of events over this interval, annotated with cartoons and photographs, which was privately published in 1997 as The Guy Sleeping Over Me Is Misty in the Peak: World War One Naval Diaries of Joseph V. Dorgan.

== Career ==
=== Early work ===
Dorgan's first known published work, a political cartoon, appeared in The New York Call in October 1913. From 1913–ca. 1916, he published several "politicals" (as he called them) for The New York Call and The Lamb: A Magazine of Fun and Finance.

One of Dorgan's drawings, "The Looter," won a Christmas contest sponsored by The New York Sun in 1913 and was published in that newspaper.

In 1914, The New York Times announced that Richard Dorgan, which it identified as a "brother of T. A. Dorgan, who draws cartoons over the signature 'Tad,' won the prize for the best poster heralding the big carnival at Bayside."

=== Not Now ===
Dorgan produced "Not Now," a comic strip for the Adams Newspaper Service, 8 W. 40th St., New York (ca. 1916).

=== The Broadside ===
By 1918, Dorgan, now a member of the U.S. Naval Reserve Force stationed at the Naval Reserve Training Camp at Pelham Bay Park, New York, was producing artwork for The Broadside: A Journal for the Naval Reserve Force.

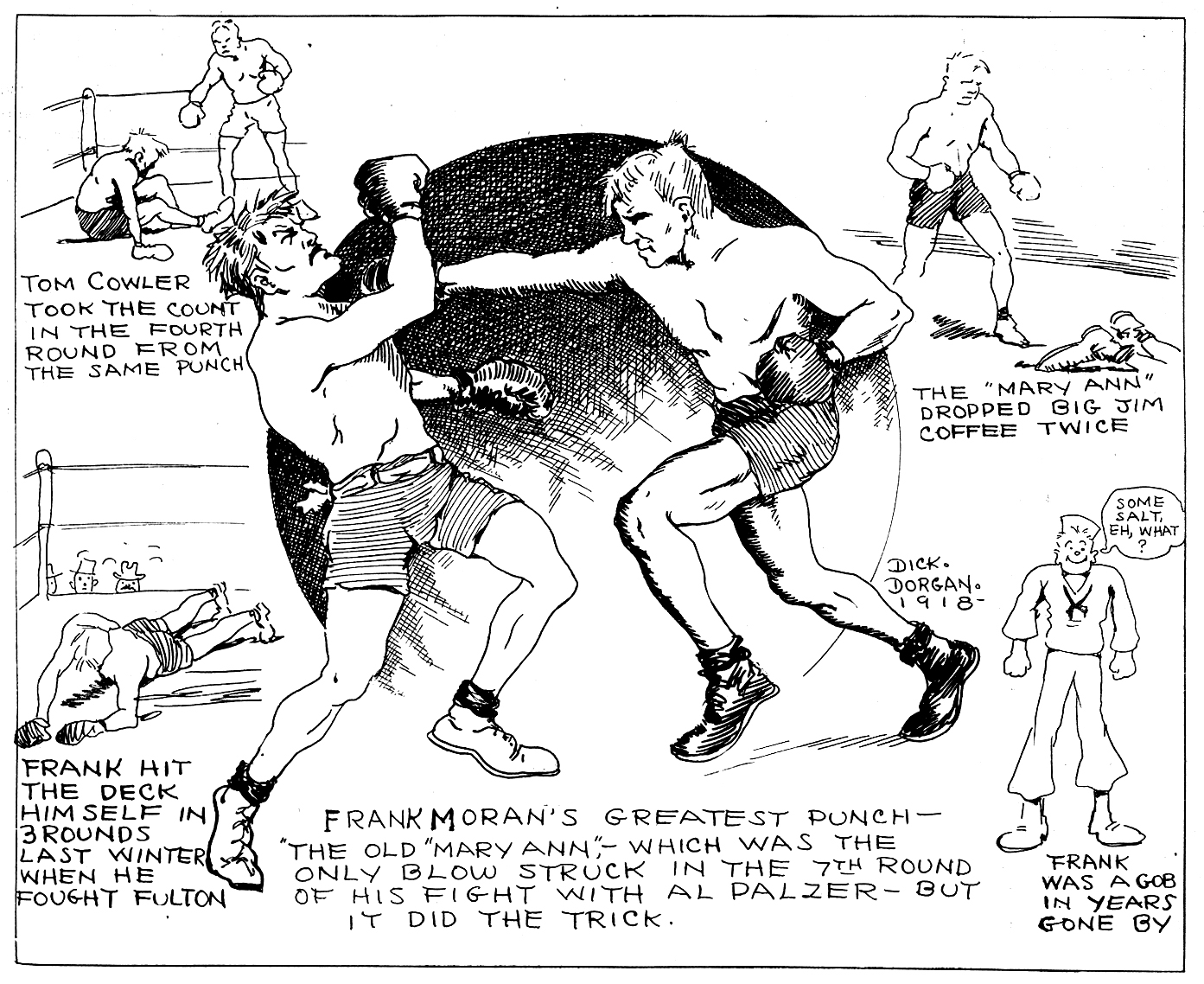
Cartoon panel from The Broadside, which illustrated the article, "Fighting Sailors of the Past and Present: Frank Moran," by Jim O'Boyle. Dick's brother, Ike Dorgan, was Frank Moran's boxing manager.

In the seventh issue (May 10, 1918), there was a short article announcing the departure of Homer Conant, "the man who has done so much in so short a time with his gifted pen to improve the appearance of The Broadside," and the arrival of W. C. Hoople, "an artist of wide repute and distinguished ability."

Unheralded though it was, Dick Dorgan's first contribution to The Broadside—"A Boot's First Night on Guard," a one-panel cartoon—appeared in the same issue.

Beginning with the eighth issue (May 24, 1918), "Richard Dorgan (sea. 2)" was listed on the masthead of The Broadside as the fourth member of the Art Department, along with George Y. Shanks (b. m. 2), W. C. Hoople (sea. 2), and Jules Ruppert (sea. 2). His second appearance in The Broadside was a two-page, eleven-panel comic-strip feature, "Sniping at the Sham Battle," which was inspired by the first sham battle of the season at the Naval Reserve Training Camp.

Among many other contributions to The Broadside, Dorgan illustrated the Biltmore Oswald stories by Thorne Smith, which were collected in two books, Biltmore Oswald: The Diary of a Hapless Recruit (1918) and Out o' Luck: Biltmore Oswald Very Much at Sea (1919).

=== Ring W. Lardner's Weekly Letter ===
Ringgold W. "Ring" Lardner (1885–1933) produced a syndicated column—usually referred to as "Ring Lardner's Weekly Letter"—for The Bell Syndicate, Inc., from November 2, 1919 through March 20, 1927. These 374 weekly columns were illustrated by Dick Dorgan.

A complete bibliography of "Ring Lardner's Weekly Letter" is found in Ring W. Lardner: A Descriptive Bibliography by Matthew J. Bruccoli and Richard Layman, as entries E3149–E3522. Examples include:

- "Ring Lardner's Letter on Recipes with Kicks" (Sunday, 18 April 1920)
- "Lardner Writes of the Lady in Upper 9" (Sunday, 11 February 1923)
- "Dorgan's Fire, Buck's New House and an Anonymous Cow Add Thrills" (Sunday, 15 February 1925)

According to Bruccoli (p. xv), "Lardner did not write the headlines for the columns, nor are the headlines consistent in subscribing newspapers." Appendix I in Bruccoli lists newspapers that are known to have subscribed to "Ring Lardner's Weekly Letter."

Lardner was a next-door neighbor of Tad Dorgan's in Great Neck, New York, and Dick Dorgan's home in Bayside, New York, was not far away. Lardner devoted a substantial portion of the article, "Dorgan's Fire, ...," to an anecdote involving Dorgan—and Dorgan's illustration featured Dick Dorgan.

Dorgan's early work with Lardner was a preview of things to come. In early 1923, Dick Dorgan joined Lardner on the comic strip, "You Know Me Al."

=== Photoplay magazine ===
Dorgan appeared with a cartoon in the November 1920 Photoplay.

In 1922, Dorgan's "slang reviews" of current moving pictures, which he illustrated, appeared in Photoplay magazine:

- "Giving 'The Sheik' the Once Over from the Ringside," a slang review of George Melford's The Sheik (1921)
- "Solving the Million Dollar Mystery: A Slang Review" of Erich von Stroheim's Foolish Wives (1922)
- "Bathing de Luxe on Saturday Night: A Slang Review" of Cecil B. DeMille's Saturday Night (1922)
- "The Loves of Pharaoh a la King: A Slang Review" of Ernst Lubitsch's Das Weib des Pharao—Pharaoh's Wife in English—(1922)

In addition to the "slang review" of The Sheik, Dorgan wrote and illustrated a particularly infamous article on Rudolph Valentino.

The Sheik and Valentino

Dorgan capitalized on the furor created by The Sheik (1921). In "Giving 'The Sheik' the Once Over from the Ringside," Dorgan provided a lively, tongue-in-cheek summary of the movie, which never even mentioned its star, Rudolph Valentino. Emily W. Leider, one of Valentino's biographers, described Dorgan's "slang review" as an "extended rant, penned by 'Dick Dorgan' (probably a made-up name), ..."!

Leider correctly noted that Dorgan's "slang review" ("Giving 'The Sheik' the Once Over from Ringside") "assumed the breezy and slangy tone of a sportswriter reporting on a match between Lady Diana and Sheik Ahmed." Leider then launched her own rant:

What really made Dorgan's blood boil was Valentino's beauty and allure. It was okay for Theda Bara, the raven-haired, racoon-eyed screen vamp whose name was supposed to be an anagram for "Arab death" ..., to assume exaggerated serpentine poses and be vaunted as the incarnation of libido run amuck. It was not okay if the vamp happened to be a gorgeous, erotically devastating foreign-born male. Within a few months of his mean-spirited spoof of The Sheik, Dorgan would use the columns of Photoplay—with a circulation of more than two million—to raise the volume of his rant on Valentino with "A Song of Hate."

Dorgan's spoof of The Sheik was no more mean-spirited than any of his other "slang reviews," and his infamous "A Song of Hate" was told with a broad wink:

I hate Valentino! All men hate Valentino. I hate his oriental optics; I hate his classic nose; I hate his Roman face; I hate his smile; I hate his glistening teeth; I hate his patent leather hair; I hate his Svengali glare; I hate him because he dances too well; I hate him because he's a slicker; I hate him because he's the great lover of the screen; I hate him because he's an embezzeler of hearts; I hate him because he's too apt in the art of osculation; I hate him because he's leading man for Gloria Swanson; I hate him because he's too good looking.

Ever since he came galloping in with the "Four Horseman" he has been the cause of more home cooked battle royals than they can print in the papers. The women are all dizzy over him. The men have formed a secret order (of which I am running for president and chief executioner as you may notice) to loathe, hate and despise him for obvious reasons.

What! Me jealous?—Oh, no—I just Hate Him.

Leider, who apparently was not familiar with the body of Dorgan's work, concluded: "Granted, there's a compliment imbedded in the ribbing; Dorgan hates Valentino because he's so irresistible and omnipresent. But there's plenty of genuine hostility mixed in."

=== You Know Me Al ===
Dorgan was involved with "You Know Me Al" from March 1923 through May 1926. However, he had worked with Ring W. Lardner, the creator of "You Know Me Al," and The Bell Syndicate, Inc., since at least November 1919.

The Bell Syndicate bought the rights to adapt Ring Lardner's "The Busher's Letters" stories, which became the comic strip "You Know Me Al."

In a letter to the F. Scott Fitzgeralds (on January 9, 1925), Ring Lardner reported, "I have quit the strip and Dick Dorgan is doing it, with help from Tad."

The strip was collected in the book, Ring Lardner's You Know Me Al: The Comic Strip Adventures of Jack Keefe (1979).

=== Kid Dugan / Divot Diggers ===
Dorgan drew a daily panel about the boxer "Kid Dugan" in the late 1920s. This panel cartoon might have been inspired by Frankie "Kid" Dugan, a welterweight from Memphis, Tennessee, who appeared in 32 bouts from 1919 to 1928.

According to Bill Blackbeard:

A trace of [Dick's brother Tad's] famed adeptness with vernacular English is perceptible in Dick Dorgan's "Kid Dugan," a boxing strip of the mid-1920s which he developed out of ["You Know Me Al"] when Lardner left the strip.

Circa 1929, the title changed to Divot Diggers, which was continued, first by Vic Forsythe, and then by Pete Llanuza, until 1940.

=== Colonel Gilfeather ===
From circa 1930–1932, Dorgan produced the daily panel Colonel Gilfeather, which was syndicated by Associated Press Feature Service and appeared in about 80 newspapers.

The strip Colonel Gilfeather and/or its title character were described by Alexander Theroux as "a rather pale and derivative imitation of Major Hoople" (actually a reference to "Our Boarding House"; like many others today, Theroux mistook Major Amos B. Hoople's name for the feature's title).

According to Donald D. Markstein, "Knock-offs, such as Associated Press's Mister Gilfeather [sic] ... began to proliferate" as a result of the success of "Our Boarding House." In Dorgan family lore, Dick's wife, Amelia, stated that the idea for Major Hoople was taken from the Colonel Gilfeather strip. Of course, this story may reflect the righteous indignation of a loyal wife whose husband's work often seemed overlooked.

Dorgan apparently left the strip in early 1932 and Alfred G. Caplin—now better known as Al Capp, the creator of "Li'l Abner"—was hired circa March 1932 to continue the feature. According to Theroux, "Capp hated doing someone else's strip. After six months, he was replaced by an apprentice artist" at the Associated Press, Milton Caniff, now better known as the creator of "Terry and the Pirates" and "Steve Canyon." Israel Shenker was more blunt:

In 1932, The Associated Press hired him [Capp] to draw "Mr. Gilfeather," a comic strip, and his best efforts failed. He quickly quit, or was dismissed, ....

In his preface to Ring Lardner's You Know Me Al: The Comic Strip Adventures of Jack Keefe, Al Capp provided the following reminiscence:

A word about Dick Dorgan. As a kid, I had come to New York from Boston, with an armful of cartoons, one an imitation of the late, great Tad Dorgan. At the Associated Press an editor looked at them and said, "One hour ago Dick Dorgan resigned from a cartoon he was doing for us. Would you like to take a crack at it for fifty dollars a week?" And so I spent my first months in New York imitating Dick Dorgan, who imitated his brother Tad. But did he? He had the same perception, but he wasn't as broad. Was he more subtle? Or couldn't he draw at all? ... I don't know.

In Colonel Gilfeather, Capp (who reportedly hated the Colonel) shifted the attention to the Colonel's younger brother, Mister Gilfeather, and changed the name of the strip accordingly. In 1933, Caniff changed the whole focus of the feature and gave it a new title, The Gay Thirties.

== Newspaper comics in summary ==
Title	Format	Dates	Syndicate	Notes
Not Now	Strip	ca. 1916–1917	Adams Newspaper Service, 8 W. 40th St., New York	Syndicate's name was changed to the George Matthew Adams Service after 1916
You Know Me Al	Strip	March 1923 – May 1926	The Bell Syndicate, Inc.	Strip began in September 1922 with Will B. Johnstone as artist
Kid Dugan	Panel	ca. 1926–1929		Title changed to "Divot Diggers," ca. 1929
Divot Diggers		ca. 1929–?		Continued, first by Vic Forsythe, and then by Pete Llanuza, until 1940
Colonel Gilfeather	Panel	ca. 1930–1932	Associated Press Feature Service	Continued by Alfred G. Caplin (Al Capp) from March–September 1932, who changed focus and title to "Mister Gilfeather"
Colonel Gilfeather	Panel	ca. 1930–1932	Associated Press Feature Service	Continued by Milton Caniff from September 12, 1932 – May 1933, who changed focus and title to "The Gay Thirties," effective May 4, 1933
Pop's Night Out	Strip	July 1936 – March 1937	Syndicated Features Corp.	Color strip; reprinted in Best Comics, no. 1 (November 1939)–no. 4 (February 1940)
Dawgs	Strip	n.d.		

The Children of Thomas J. and Anna R. Dorgan née Tobin
Name	Nickname	Birth	Death
Thomas Aloysius Dorgan	Tad	April 29, 1877	May 2, 1929
Thomas Aloysius Dorgan	Tad	San Francisco CA	Great Neck NY
John Leo Dorgan	Ike	April 15, 1879	December 27, 1960
John Leo Dorgan	Ike	San Francisco CA	Bayside NY
Catherine Dorgan		November 13, 1880	
Catherine Dorgan		San Francisco CA	
Marie Helen Dorgan		February 20, 1882	May 20, 1939
Marie Helen Dorgan		San Francisco CA	Cincinnati OH
Charles James Dorgan		June 16, 1883	September 28, 1922
Charles James Dorgan		San Francisco CA	Colfax CA
Edwin Joseph Dorgan		November 27, 1885	October 31, 1956
Edwin Joseph Dorgan		San Francisco CA	Flushing NY
Anna Loretta Dorgan	Nan	January 14, 1888	June 1, 1967
Anna Loretta Dorgan	Nan	San Francisco CA	Bayside NY
Irene Dorgan	Eileen / Eile	September 12, 1890	October 5, 1945
Irene Dorgan	Eileen / Eile	San Francisco CA	Flushing NY
Richard William Dorgan	Dick	September 24, 1892	May 5, 1953
Richard William Dorgan	Dick	San Francisco CA	Bayside NY
Joseph Vincent Dorgan	Joe	December 25, 1894	August 8, 1945
Joseph Vincent Dorgan	Joe	San Francisco CA	Bayside NY
Alice Anita Dorgan		April 19, 1898	November 15, 1963
Alice Anita Dorgan		San Francisco CA	Bayside NY
