= Judge Rummy =

American comic strip by Tad Dorgan

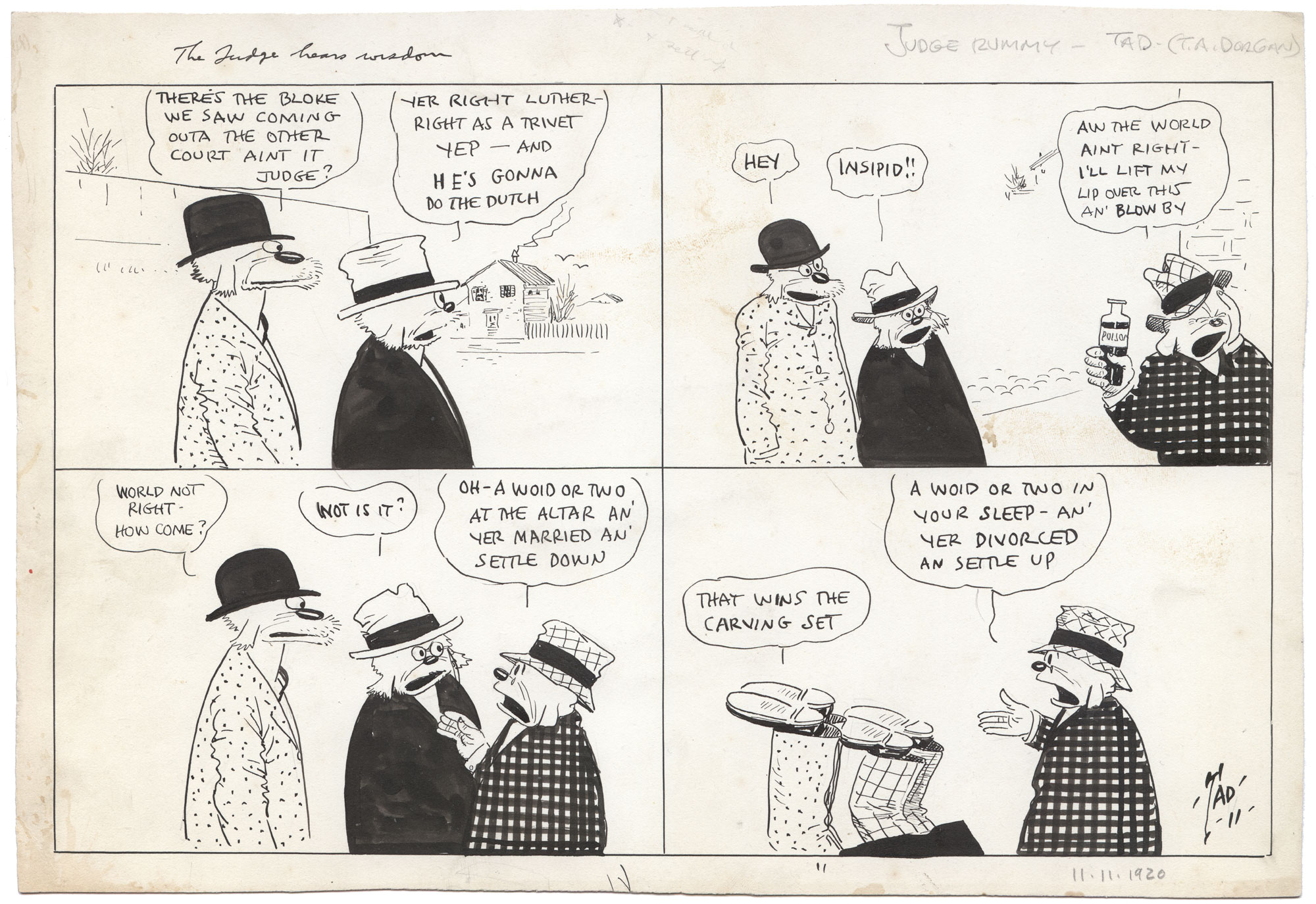
One of the strips of the character (1920)

Judge Rummy (also known as Silk Hat Harry's Divorce Suit, Old Judge Rumhauser, and Judge Rummy's Court) was an American comic strip by Tad Dorgan published from 1910 until 1922. It featured an anthropomorphic dog. Between 1918 and 1922 the character was also the subject of a series of short animated cartoons.

S. J. Perelman stated in 1978 that Dorgan's inspiration for the strip had been the murder trial of Harry K. Thaw, and that the strip led Dorgan to be threatened with libel lawsuits more than once.

== Fictional biography ==
Alexander Rumhauser, better known as Judge Rummy, works as a court judge as his moniker implies. However, he is often seen doing other things like drinking alcohol and having affairs with women despite being married. Whenever he interacts with other characters, the strip often ends with at least one of them (including Judge Rummy) being upside down and showing only the feet (as shown in the strip above).

He had a minor role in an earlier strip in which his best friend was the protagonist, but later strips began focusing on him.

His wife is an obese lady who is four times his size. Whenever Judge Rummy dates a woman other than her or does something she finds unfavorable, the hefty wife would resort to brawling and roughing him up. Unlike other characters in the strip, she calls him either by his real name or sometimes "Alecthander".

Judge Rummy's best friend is a look-alike dog named Silk Hat Harry. Both dogs share similar interests in drinking booze and pursuing ladies.

== In film ==
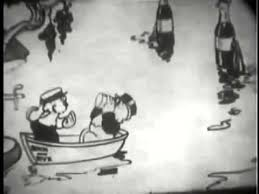
A scene from A Joy Ride, one of the animated cartoons based on the strip

Judge Rummy also appears in short films created by the International Film Service and Bray Productions from 1918 to 1922. The cartoons were directed by Gregory La Cava, Jack King, Burt Gillett and Grim Natwick.

- 1918: "Judge Rummy's Off Day" (Aug 19), "Hash and Hypnotism" (Oct), "Twinkle Twinkle" (Dec)
- 1919: "Snappy Cheese" (Mar 22), "The Sawdust Trail" (June 22), "The Breath of a Nation" (June 29), "Good Night Nurse" (Aug 24), "Judge Rummy's Miscue" (Sept), "Rubbing It In" (Oct), "A Sweet Pickle" (Nov)
- 1920: "Shimmie Shivers" (Apr 21), "A Fitting Gift" (May 7), "His Last Legs" (May 25), "Smokey Smokes" (June 6), "Doctors Should Have Patience" (June 19), "A Fish Story" (July 3), "The Last Rose of Summer" (July 17), "The Fly Guy" (Aug 26), "Shedding the Profiteer (Sept 5), "The Sponge Man" (Sept 22), "The Prize Dance" (Oct 3), "Hypnotize Hooch" (Oct 26), "The Hooch Ball" (Nov 3), "Kiss Me" (Nov 3), "Snap Judgement" (Nov 22), "Why Change Your Husband" (Nov 22), "Bear Facts (Dec 10), "Yes Dear" (Dec 12)
- 1921: "Too Much Pep" (Jan 4), "The Chicken Thief" (Jan 17), "The Skating Fool" (Mar 15)
