= Joe Btfsplk =

Fictional character from Li'l Abner

Joe Btfsplk, the world's worst jinx, in this excerpt from the March 20, 1947 strip

Joe Btfsplk is a character in the satirical comic strip Li'l Abner by cartoonist Al Capp. The hapless Btfsplk means well, but he is "the world's worst jinx" and brings disastrous misfortune to everyone around him. A small, dark rain cloud perpetually hovers over his head to symbolize his bad luck. Btfsplk and his ever-present cloud became one of the most iconic images in Li'l Abner.

== Background ==
Joe's first appearance was on July 7, 1940.

One storyline in the early 1970s features him trapping his cloud in a special anti-pollutant jar. Joe becomes romantically involved with a gal for the first time—until her crazed ex-boyfriend shows up to kill him. Joe reluctantly opens the jar and releases his cloud in order to take care of the boyfriend and wistfully realizes that he wasn't meant for any other kind of life. As he returns to his normal, loner existence, his cloud once again in tow, he is for the moment satisfied to be who he really is.

In addition to the obvious comic effect, Capp often used Joe Btfsplk as a deus ex machina to produce miraculous rescues or to effect plot twists. Joe was later licensed for use in a series of animated TV commercials for Head & Shoulders, a dandruff shampoo.

== Pronunciation ==
According to Al Capp, the creator of the character, "btfsplk" is a rude sound. During public lectures, Capp demonstrated this sound by closing his lips, leaving his tongue sticking out, and then blowing out air, which is colloquially called a "raspberry" or Bronx cheer.

How else would you pronounce it?

— Al Capp

== See also ==
- Eeyore
- Rob McKenna
- Mister Mxyzptlk
- Calamity James
