= Bruce Russell (cartoonist) =

American cartoonist

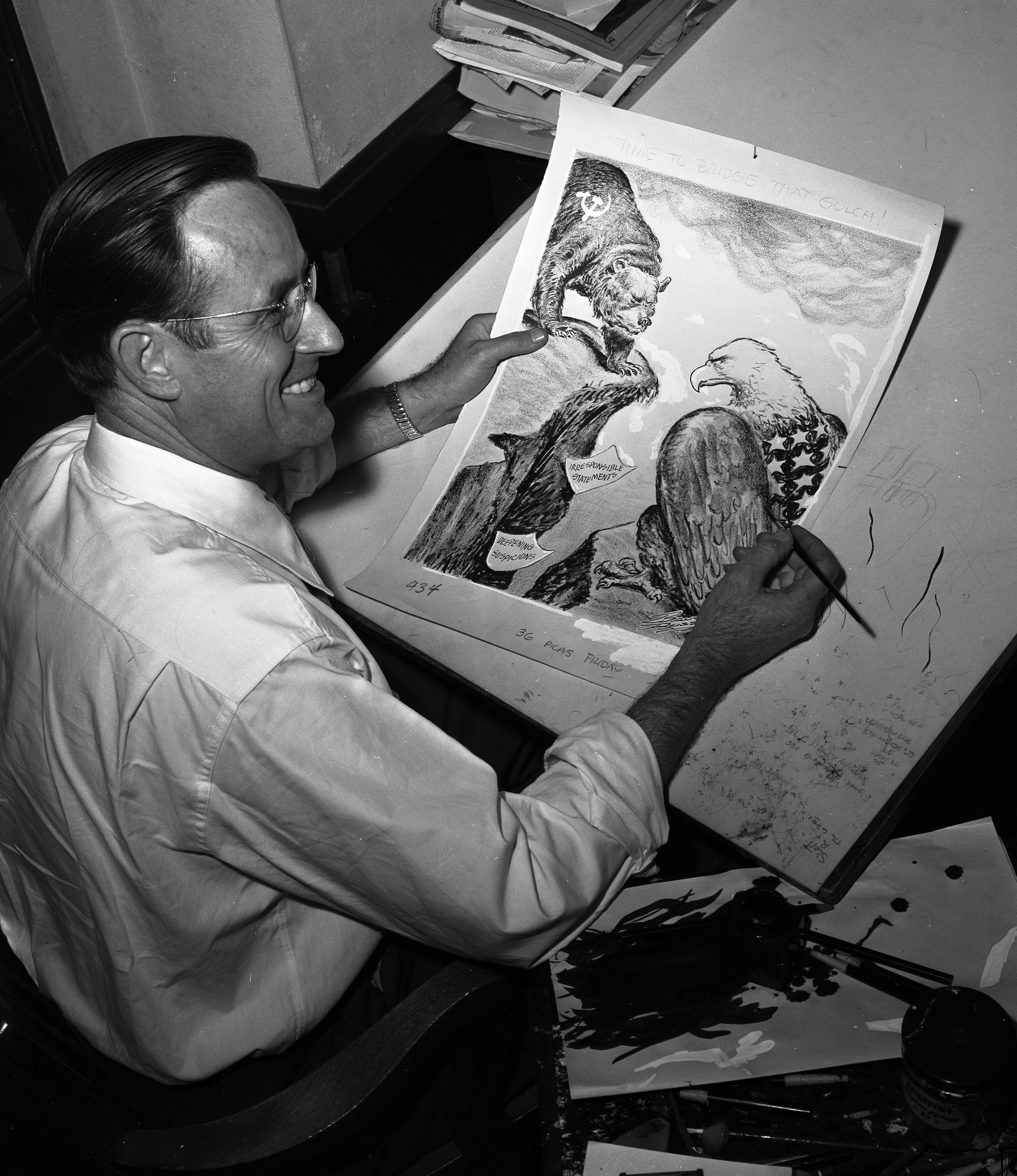
Russell with his Pulitzer Prize-winning cartoon

Bruce Alexander Russell (August 4, 1903 – December 18, 1963) was an American editorial cartoonist and comics artist.

After studying at the Southern branch of the University of California, where he worked for the Cub Californian, he was hired for the Los Angeles Times as a sports cartoonist in 1927. He also drew a nationally syndicated cartoon, Rollo Rollingstone (for AP Newsfeatures) during the early 1930s. In 1934, he became the lead cartoonist for the Times, a position he held until his death of a heart attack.

Russell won the annual Pulitzer Prize for Editorial Cartooning in 1946. His winning cartoon, entitled "Time to Bridge that Gulch," shows an American eagle and a Russian bear facing each other over a gulch filled with "irresponsible statements" and "deepening suspicions."

His papers are held at University of California, Los Angeles.
