= Scorchy Smith =

American comic strip (1930–1961)

- Scorchy Smith strip from August 8, 1942.
- Author(s): John Terry (1930–1933); Noel Sickles (1933–1936); Bert Christman (1936–1938); Robert W. Farrell (1938–1939); Frank Robbins (1939–1944); Edmond Good (1944–1945); Rodlow Willard (1946–1954); George Tuska (1954–1959); Alvin Hollingsworth (1950s); John Milt Morris (1959–1961)
- Current status/schedule: Concluded daily & Sunday strip
- Launch date: March 17, 1930
- End date: December 30, 1961
- Syndicate(s): AP Newsfeatures
- Genre(s): Adventure, children, teens, adults

Scorchy Smith is an American adventure comic strip created by artist John Terry that ran from March 17, 1930 to December 30, 1961.

Scorchy Smith was a pilot-for-hire whose initial adventures took him across America, fighting criminals and aiding damsels in distress. Later, Scorchy traveled the world fighting spies and foreign aggression.

== Publication history ==
=== Terry and Sickles ===
Sample Noel Sickles strips.

Charles Lindbergh's 1927 transatlantic flight increased interest in aviation, and together with several other flight-related adventure strips, Scorchy Smith debuted in 1930, created by John Terry for AP Newsfeatures. When Terry developed fatal tuberculosis in 1933, the strip was assigned to Noel Sickles; Sickles' first credited strip ran on April 2, 1934. Sickles increased the popularity of Scorchy Smith, which became AP's leading strip. Sickles' impressionistic style and cinematic compositions, plus his frequent use of areas of pure black ink and Zipatone shading, was dramatically different from any other cartoonist at the time. Milton Caniff's mastery of the medium is frequently attributed to his collaborations with Sickles.

After working on the strip for two years, Sickles estimated that Scorchy Smith was running in about 250 newspapers, which would make the syndicate about $2,500 a month. He only got paid $125 a month, so he asked the syndicate for a raise. He didn't get it, so he quit the strip to become a commercial illustrator. His last strip ran on October 24, 1936.

=== From Sickles to Christman ===
Rodlow Willard drew the strip from 1946 to 1954.

Sickles was succeeded by Bert Christman, who began drawing and scripting the strip November 23, 1936. Christman, a cartoonist who also co-created the Sandman for DC Comics, joined the U.S. Navy as an aviation cadet in June 1938, resigning his commission three years later to join the American Volunteer Group being recruited to fly for the Chinese Air Force. He was shot down, bailed out, then strafed and killed in Burma as a pilot with the AVG, by then famous as the Flying Tigers.

After Christman left Scorchy Smith, a succession of artists handled the strip, including Howell Dodd and Frank Robbins, who began drawing the strip on May 22, 1939. Robbins, who had never had a feature of his own before, soon developed a solid reputation for creating comic-strip adventure. A wartime sequence set in Russia drew the following comment."...formidable reality: it creates the sense of deep snows, it is full of bitter, bloody struggle". In 1944, he was hired by King Features Syndicate, where he created Johnny Hazard, another pilot-adventurer. Robbins' last strip ran March 12, 1944.

After Robbins left the strip, it was taken on by Edmond Good (1944-1946), Rodlow Willard (1946–1953), Alvin Hollingsworth (1953-1954), George Tuska (1954–1959), and John Milt Morris (1959–1961). The strip ended on December 30, 1961. Hollingsworth was long believed the last to do Sundays as well as dailies, but using online newspaper sources it was discovered that George Tuska did a daily version until July 25, 1959 with AP staff artist John Morris continuing into 1961. and a two tier Sunday version until the end of 1955. The last story George Tuska did was published (and possibly drawn) at the same time as the first strips of his new job, Buck Rogers.

== Reprints ==
Scorchy Smith was reprinted in Famous Funnies and in two collections published by Nostalgia Press in the 1970s.

The daily strip from July 27, 1936, through July 30, 1938 and May 22, 1939 through March 11, 1944 by Noel Sickles, Bert Christman and Frank Robbins, have been reprinted in Big Fun Comics #1–9, (published by American Comic Archive.

In 2008, IDW Publishing published via their imprint; The Library of American Comics, Scorchy Smith and the Art of Noel Sickles, which reprints the complete 1933–36 Scorchy Smith run by Sickles. ISBN 1-60010-206-9
