= Ike Dorgan =

American boxing manager and publisher (1879–1960)

John L. "Ike" Dorgan (April 15, 1879 – December 27, 1960) was a bookbinder, boxing manager, press agent, and publicity manager for the Madison Square Garden. He was a founding partner of The Ring magazine.

== Biography ==
Dorgan was born in San Francisco, California, in April 1879, one of at least eleven children—six sons and five daughters—of Thomas J. and Anna R. Dorgan (née Tobin). Among his siblings were Thomas A. "Tad" Dorgan, prominent cartoonist and creator of the panel Indoor Sports, as well as a well-known sportswriter; Richard "Dick" Dorgan, cartoonist, writer, and illustrator; and Joseph V. "Joe" Dorgan.

Ike Dorgan worked as a bookbinder very early in his career. Later, he was a boxing manager for Harry Ebbets and Frank "Fighting Dentist" Moran, a press agent for boxing promoter George L. "Tex" Rickard, and publicity manager for the Madison Square Garden. He was a founding partner of The Ring magazine in February 1922 and remained with the publication until his retirement in 1930.

Ike's brother Tad Dorgan was inducted into the International Boxing Hall of Fame in 2007 in the category of "Observer"; that is, print and media journalists, publishers, writers, historians, photographers, and artists. Ike Dorgan has not yet been inducted into the International Boxing Hall of Fame.

The Children of Thomas J. and Anna R. Dorgan née Tobin
| Name | Nickname | Birth | Death |
|---|---|---|---|
| Thomas Aloysius Dorgan | Tad | 29 April 1877 | 2 May 1929 |
| Thomas Aloysius Dorgan | Tad | San Francisco CA | Great Neck NY |
| John Leo Dorgan | Ike | 15 April 1879 | 27 December 1960 |
| John Leo Dorgan | Ike | San Francisco CA | Bayside NY |
| Catherine Dorgan | | 13 November 1880 | |
| Catherine Dorgan | | San Francisco CA | |
| Marie Helen Dorgan | | 20 February 1882 | 20 May 1939 |
| Marie Helen Dorgan | | San Francisco CA | Cincinnati OH |
| Charles James Dorgan | | 16 June 1883 | 28 September 1922 |
| Charles James Dorgan | | San Francisco CA | Colfax CA |
| Edwin Joseph Dorgan | | 27 November 1885 | 31 October 1956 |
| Edwin Joseph Dorgan | | San Francisco CA | Flushing NY |
| Anna Loretta Dorgan | Nan | 14 January 1888 | 1 June 1967 |
| Anna Loretta Dorgan | Nan | San Francisco CA | Bayside NY |
| Irene Dorgan | Eileen / Eile | 12 September 1890 | 5 October 1945 |
| Irene Dorgan | Eileen / Eile | San Francisco CA | Flushing NY |
| Richard William Dorgan | Dick | 24 September 1892 | 5 May 1953 |
| Richard William Dorgan | Dick | San Francisco CA | Bayside NY |
| Joseph Vincent Dorgan | Joe | 25 December 1894 | 8 August 1945 |
| Joseph Vincent Dorgan | Joe | San Francisco CA | Bayside NY |
| Alice Anita Dorgan | | 19 April 1898 | 15 November 1963 |
| Alice Anita Dorgan | | San Francisco CA | Bayside NY |
