= Tad Dorgan =

American cartoonist (1877–1929)

Thomas Aloysius Dorgan
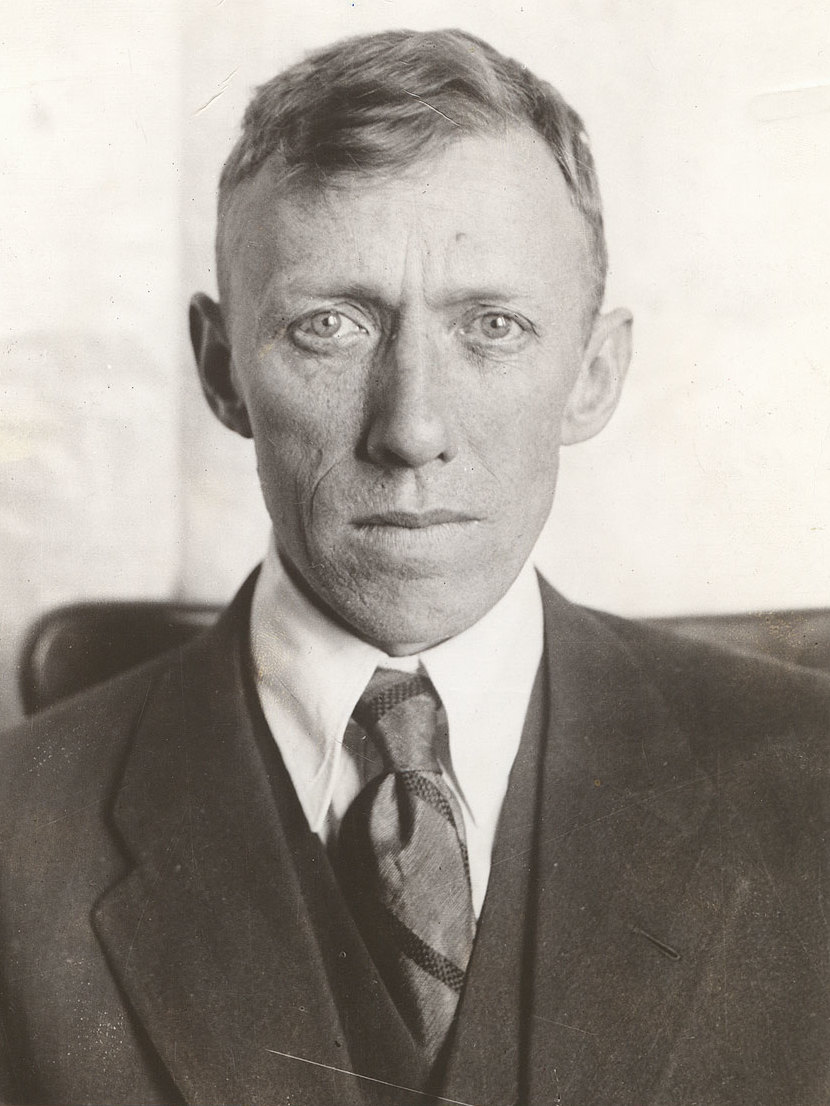
- Born: April 29, 1877; San Francisco, California
- Died: May 2, 1929 (aged 52); Great Neck, New York
- Occupations: Journalist, Cartoonist, Sportswriter
- Notable credit(s): San Francisco Bulletin, San Francisco Chronicle, New York Journal
- Spouse: Izola M. Dorgan
- Family: Thomas J. Dorgan; Father; Anna Dorgan; Mother

Thomas Aloysius "Tad" Dorgan (April 29, 1877 – May 2, 1929) was an American cartoonist. He is known for his cartoon panel Indoor Sports and comic strip Judge Rummy, as well as the many English words and expressions he coined or popularized.

== Early life ==
Dorgan was born in San Francisco on April 29, 1877. He was one of at least eleven children – six sons and five daughters – of Thomas J. and Anna Dorgan. His brother John L. "Ike" Dorgan (born April 1879) was publicity manager for the Madison Square Garden, and his brother Richard W. "Dick" Dorgan (born September 1892) was an illustrator and cartoonist.

Polytechnic High School teachers Rosey Murdoch and Maria Van Vieck recognized and encouraged Tad's talent as an artist. When Dorgan was a child, he lost several fingers of his right hand in an accident whose details are unclear. Cosmopolitan writer O. O. McIntyre, a friend of Dorgan's, wrote that when Dorgan "was eight, he was fooling around on a house-moving job and attempted to ride a shovel on a rope that was propelled by a big pulley. He turned his head for a second and his right hand was caught in a pulley, crushing off four fingers of that right hand, which was reduced to a thumb and a piece of knuckle." Henry Morton Robinson's description of the incident is largely the same, except that he said it took place when Dorgan was nine. Westbrook Pegler, another friend of Dorgan's, wrote that Dorgan had lost "the first two fingers and half of the palm of his right hand" in an incident with a buzzsaw. Comics historian John Adcock noted that, of all the "dozens of different stories", only McIntyre's version accorded with the statement on Dorgan's draft card that he had "all fingers except thumb off of right hand".

After the amputation, Dorgan took up drawing for therapy. When he was 14 he joined the art staff of the San Francisco Bulletin.

== Strips and panels ==
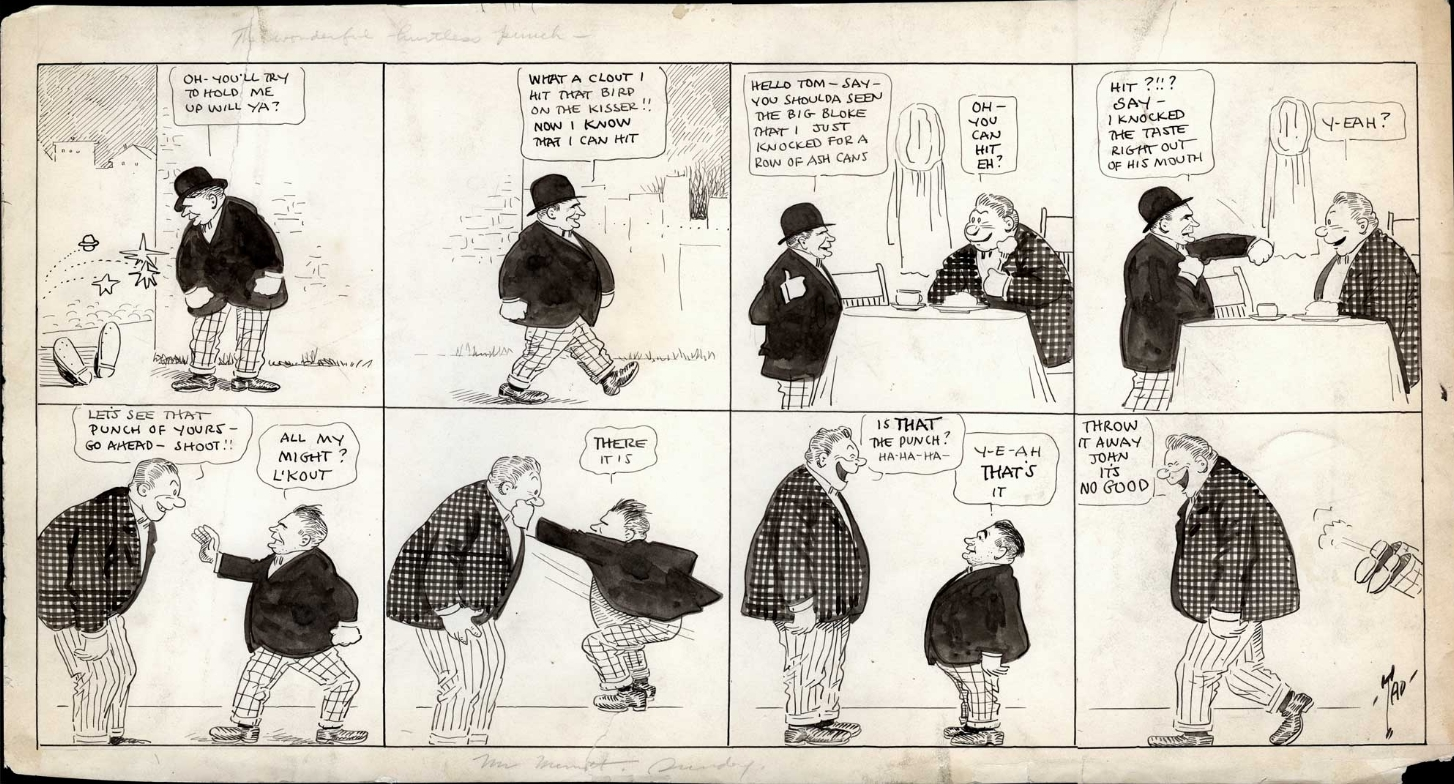
Installment of Dorgan's "City Life" (1921)

He created his first comic strip, Johnny Wise, for the San Francisco Chronicle in 1902. By 1905 he was working in New York City at the New York Journal as a sports writer and cartoonist. Jack Dempsey described him as "the greatest authority on boxing".

In addition to his work as a sports journalist, Dorgan did a humor feature, "Daffydils." His dog cartoons, including Judge Rummy (1910-1922), evolved into the strip Silk Hat Harry's Divorce Suit. This was accompanied by a one-panel gag series called Indoor Sports which became his main feature, along with an occasional Outdoor Sports.

== Slang ==
Dorgan is generally credited with either creating or popularizing such words and expressions as "dumbbell" (a stupid person); "for crying out loud" (an exclamation of astonishment); "cat's meow" and "cat's pajamas" (as superlatives); "applesauce" (nonsense); "cheaters" (eyeglasses); "skimmer" (a hat); "hard-boiled" (tough and unsentimental); "drugstore cowboy" (a loafer or ladies' man); "nickel-nurser" (a miser); "as busy as a one-armed paperhanger" (overworked); and "Yes, we have no bananas", which was turned into a popular song.

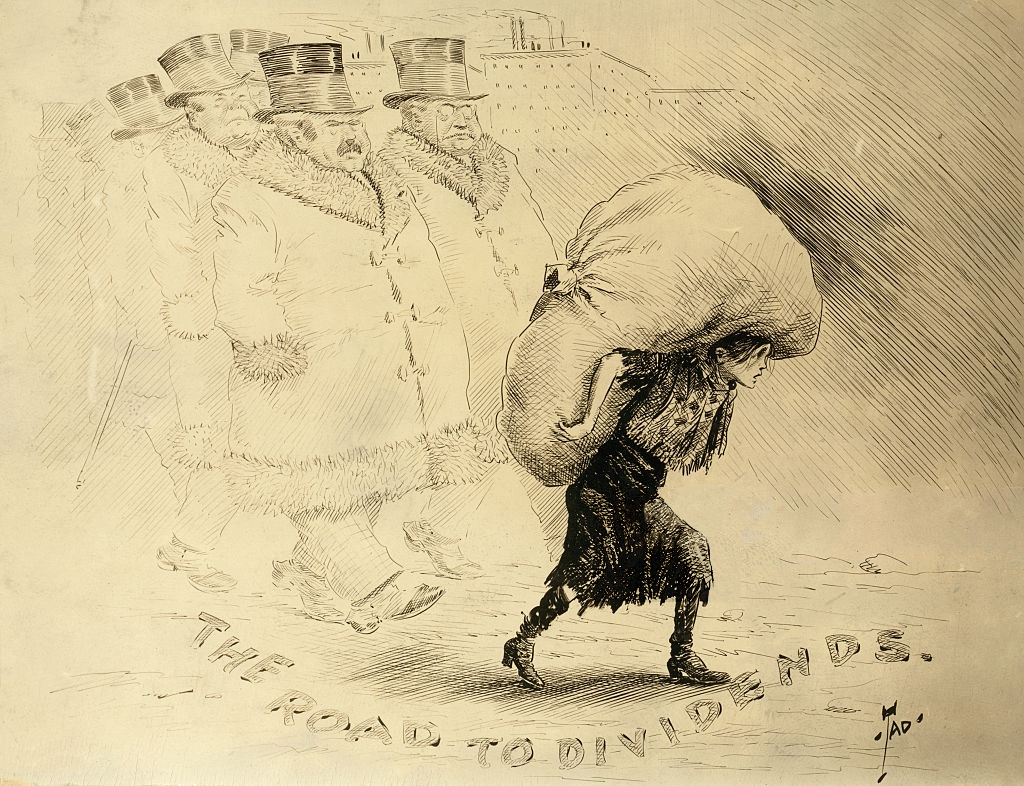
In addition to his humorous and sports-related cartoons, Dorgan also drew political cartoons, such as this example, "The Road to Dividends", in which a young child is weighed down by a heavy burden while several wealthy men march behind her.

In the New York Times obituary, he was bracketed with George Ade and Ring Lardner as a popularizer of "a new slang vernacular". His obituary also credited him as the originator of "Twenty-three, Skidoo", "solid ivory", "Dumb Dora", "finale hopper", "Benny" for hat, and "dogs" for shoes. W. J. Funk, of the Funk and Wagnall's dictionary company, placed Dorgan at the top of the list of the ten "most fecund makers of American slang". The word 'hip' in the sense of "aware, in the know" is first attested in a 1902 cartoon by Tad Dorgan and first appeared in print in a 1904 novel by George V. Hobart, Jim Hickey, A Story of the One-Night Stands, where an African-American character uses the slang phrase "Are you hip?" These are referenced in the Random House Historical Dictionary of American Slang.

Dorgan was erroneously credited with coining the usage of the phrase "hot dog" as slang for sausage.

== Life in Great Neck ==
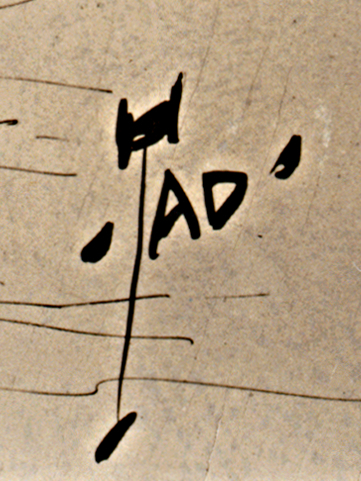
"Tad" signature of Tad Dorgan

Tad Dorgan and his wife, Izole M., lived in Great Neck, New York in a house valued at $75,000. They had no biological children, but they raised two Chinese children to adulthood. Dorgan stopped attending sporting events in the early 1920s because of poor health, and a heart ailment kept him at home for the last eight years of his life, but he continued to produce sports comics for William Randolph Hearst until his death. He died in Great Neck of heart disease, hastened by pneumonia. Hearst newspapers announced his passing in front-page headlines and some of his cartoons were reprinted for a short time. Izole, a writer before she married Dorgan, was the vice-president of the National Doll and Toy Collectors Club. After Tad's death, she started a successful business manufacturing doll furniture.

== Books ==
In 1911, Dorgan's art was the cover for a collection of works from 18 artists of the day. The compilation was entitled Daffydils, named after Dorgan's column. It was published by Cupples & Leon in 1911. He later began a column called Indoor Sports, examples of which can be found in the Library of Congress.

== Awards ==
Tad Dorgan was inducted into the International Boxing Hall of Fame in 2007 in the category of "Observer"; that is, print and media journalists, publishers, writers, historians, photographers, and artists.

The Children of Thomas J. and Anna R. Dorgan née Tobin
Name	Nickname	Birth	Death
Thomas Aloysius Dorgan	Tad	29 April 1877	2 May 1929
Thomas Aloysius Dorgan	Tad	San Francisco CA	Great Neck NY
John Leo Dorgan	Ike	15 April 1879	27 December 1960
John Leo Dorgan	Ike	San Francisco CA	Bayside NY
Catherine Dorgan		13 November 1880	
Catherine Dorgan		San Francisco CA	
Marie Helen Dorgan		20 February 1882	20 May 1939
Marie Helen Dorgan		San Francisco CA	Cincinnati OH
Charles James Dorgan		16 June 1883	28 September 1922
Charles James Dorgan		San Francisco CA	Colfax CA
Edwin Joseph Dorgan		27 November 1885	31 October 1956
Edwin Joseph Dorgan		San Francisco CA	Flushing NY
Anna Loretta Dorgan	Nan	14 January 1888	1 June 1967
Anna Loretta Dorgan	Nan	San Francisco CA	Bayside NY
Irene Dorgan	Eileen / Eile	12 September 1890	5 October 1945
Irene Dorgan	Eileen / Eile	San Francisco CA	Flushing NY
Richard William Dorgan	Dick	24 September 1892	5 May 1953
Richard William Dorgan	Dick	San Francisco CA	Bayside NY
Joseph Vincent Dorgan	Joe	25 December 1894	8 August 1945
Joseph Vincent Dorgan	Joe	San Francisco CA	Bayside NY
Alice Anita Dorgan		19 April 1898	15 November 1963
Alice Anita Dorgan		San Francisco CA	Bayside NY

== Sources ==
- McCrory, Amy. "Sport Cartoons in Context: TAD Dorgan and Multi-Genre Cartooning in Early Twentieth-Century Newspapers", American Periodicals: A Journal of History, Criticism, and Bibliography – Volume 18, Number 1, pp. 45–68. The Ohio State University Press, 2008.
- Zwilling, Leonard. A TAD Lexicon. Etymology and Linguistic Principles: V.3, Rolla MO: G. Cohen, 1993.
- TAD IS DONE, SERIOUSLY - obituary by Westbrook Pegler; published in The Washington Post, May 3, 1929; archived at Allan Holtz's StrippersGuide
