= Coulton Waugh =

American comics artist

- Coulton Waugh self-portrait
- Born: Frederick Coulton Waugh; 10 March 1896; Cornwall, England
- Died: 23 May 1973; Newburgh, New York, U.S.
- Education: Art Students League
- Occupation: Cartoonist
- Known for: Dickie Dare, The Comics
- Relatives: Frederick Judd Waugh (father), Samuel Waugh grandfather

Frederick Coulton Waugh (/wɔː/; 10 March 1896 – 23 May 1973) was a cartoonist, painter, teacher and author, best known for his illustration work on the comic strip Dickie Dare and his book The Comics (1947), the first major study of the field.

His father was the marine artist Frederick Judd Waugh, and his grandfather was the Philadelphia portrait painter Samuel Waugh. Born in Cornwall, England, in 1896, in 1907 his family moved to the United States, and Waugh was enrolled at New York's Art Students League where he studied with George Bridgman, Frank Dumond and John Carlson.

By 1916 Coulton was employed as a textile designer. Two years later, he married Elizabeth Jenkinson. In 1921 the couple moved to Provincetown, Massachusetts, where they operated a model ship and hooked rug shop for 11 years. His paintings were displayed at New York's Hudson Walker Gallery, and he also was known for his pictorial maps and hand-colored lithographs.

== Maps ==
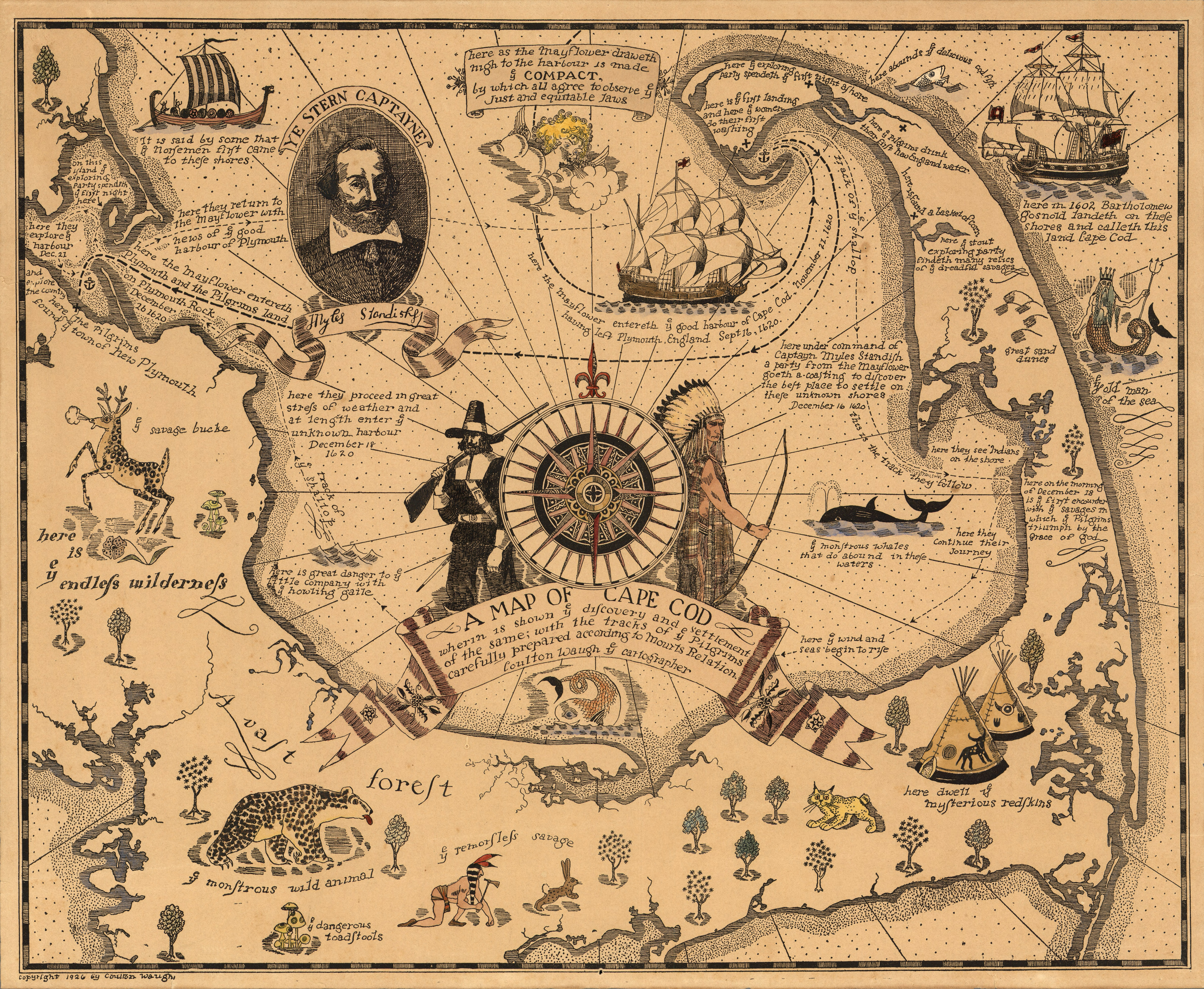
Coulton Waugh's A Map of Cape Cod (1926), a hand-coloured print.

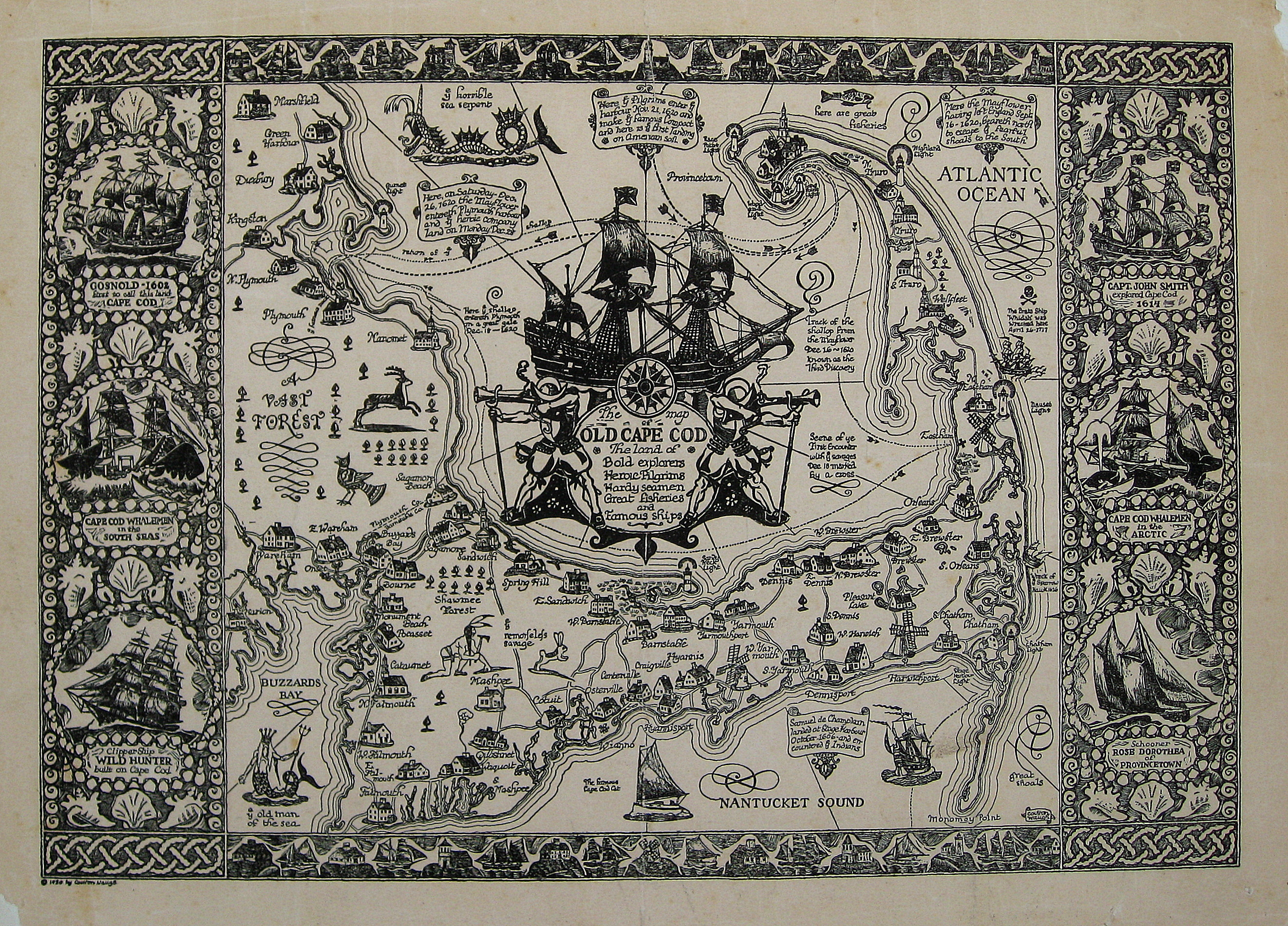
The Cape Cod map that is described as "one of the most decorative ever prepared." Image owned by Maps of Antiquity, Chatham, MA.

In Provincetown he created decorative maps, including ones of Provincetown (1924), Cape Cod (1926) and Newburgh, New York (1958). His map of California (1948) was a collaboration with his wife Odin Burvik (Mabel Burwick). One of his Cape Cod maps was detailed by Laura Guadnazno in the Provincetown Banner:

Coulton Waugh lived near his father in the house known as the "oldest house" at 72 Commercial St., where he ran a ship model shop. Coulton was a professional sailor and made scale drawings of historic ships, designed fabrics, and made decorative maps and charts... Waugh was considered to have revived, if not originated the art of decorative map making when he exhibited a large map of silk in 1918 at the International Silk Show in New York City. His map of Cape Cod is one of the most decorative ever prepared. The central cartouche shows the Mayflower and two Pilgrims in armour. The border was reproduced from a drawing cut with a knife in the wood-block technique. The top and bottom borders are of a stylised Cape Cod landscape and the sides borders are decorated with the images of six famous ships.

== Comic strips ==
In 1945, Waugh employed a novel art approach on his strip Hank. According to Waugh, Hank was also "a deliberate attempt to work in the field of social usefulness."

Created by Milton Caniff, Dickie Dare began 31 July 1933. Imaginative 12-year-old Dickie, who dreamed himself into adventures with characters from history, was joined in 1934 with writer Dan Flynn, a friend of Dickie's father, and the two had many seagoing adventures. When Caniff left in 1934 to do Terry and the Pirates, Waugh began drawing Dickie Dare in the middle of a story. In 1944, when Waugh left the strip to work on Hank (1945), his wife and assistant, Odin Burvik, took over Dickie Dare in 1944–47, followed by Fran Matera (1948–49). But Waugh eventually returned to the strip in 1950–58 with the 12-year-old Dickie growing up to become a Navy Cadet.

Between his stints on Dickie Dare, Waugh created his own short-lived but notable strip, Hank, which began 30 April 1945 in the New York newspaper PM. The story of a disabled GI returning to civilian life, Hank had a unique look due to Waugh's decorative art style, combined with dialogue lettered in upper and lower case rather than the accepted convention of all upper case lettering in balloons and captions. Some balloons were done with white lettering in black balloons. The uniqueness of Hank continued below its surface, as Waugh sought to raise questions about the reasons for war, and how it might be prevented by the next generation. Waugh discontinued it at the very end of 1945 due to eyestrain.

== Books ==

Waugh's 1947 survey, The Comics, was the first comprehensive history and analysis of comic strips. The book was reviewed in 1948 as fulfilling "the need for a thoroughgoing study of this flourishing branch of popular literature". Waugh also wrote a series of instructional books, including two on painting with palette knives, and he was the editor during the 1940s and 1950s of the textbooks used in the home study course of Art Instruction, Inc. His other books include Space Answer Book (1972) and Fish and Underwater Life.

During the 1930s and 1940s, Waugh's studio was in suburban Newburgh, New York. He was also a teacher at Orange County Community College in Newburgh, and was curator of the Storm King Art Center in Mountainville, New York. His works are held in the collections of museums in Ohio, New York and Iowa. His papers are held at the Syracuse University and the Archives of American Art.

== Death ==
Waugh died at his home in Newburgh on 23 May 1973. He and his wife had a son and a daughter.
