= The Adventures of Patsy =

American comic strip

- The Adventures of Patsy (January 18, 1943) art by George Storm.
- Author(s): Mel Graff (1935–1940); Charles Raab; George Storm; Richard Hall; Bill Dyer
- Current status/schedule: Concluded daily & Sunday strip
- Launch date: March 11, 1935
- End date: April 2, 1955
- Alternate name(s): Patsy in Hollywood; Patsy
- Syndicate(s): AP Newsfeatures
- Genre: Fantasy

The Adventures of Patsy was an American newspaper comic strip which ran from March 11, 1935, to April 2, 1955. Created by Mel Graff, it was syndicated by AP Newsfeatures. The Phantom Magician, an early supporting character in the strip, is regarded by some comics historians as among the first superheroes of comics.

== Publication history ==
Mel Graff departed in May 1940 to take over Secret Agent X-9; the last daily strip credited to Graff ran June 15, 1940. Charles Rabb took over the strip on June 17, 1940, and added a Sunday page in October 1941, also known as Patsy in Hollywood. Rabb left the strip as of December 5, 1942.

After Rabb, the strip was unsigned for a few months (December 7, 1942 - March 20, 1943), and then went through a succession of creators: George Storm (March 22, 1943 - April 8, 1944), Al McClean (April 10, 1944 - April 7, 1945), Richard Hall (April 9, 1945 - April 6, 1946) and finally William Dyer, who debuted on the strip April 8, 1946, and stayed for nine years, until the strip came to a conclusion on April 2, 1955.

== Characters and story ==
The strip originated as a fantasy. The story began with five-year-old Patsy carried away in a kite to the magical kingdom of Ods Bodkins. (This setting is unrelated to Odd Bodkins, a later comic strip launched in 1964 by cartoonist Dan O'Neill.) During her fanciful journey, Patsy was accompanied and often rescued by the masked Phantom Magician. When they returned to Earth, the Phantom Magician doffed his duds for conventional clothing and assumed the identity of Phil Cardigan, Patsy's uncle, in December 1936. With stories situated in Hollywood, Uncle Phil worked as a screenwriter and Patsy was a young movie actress for producer J. P. Panberg. After Phil was eventually written out of the strip, Patsy's new sidekick was Hollywood agent Skidd Higgins.

=== The Phantom Magician ===
An early supporting character, the swashbuckling Phantom Magician, introduced a fantasy element. Some comics historians regard this character and Lee Falk's Mandrake the Magician as among the first superheroes of comics. Don Markstein writes, "Depending on how you define the term, Patsy's recurring rescuer, The Phantom Magician, may have been the first superhero in comics... Some people say Mandrake the Magician, who started in 1934, was comics' first superhero."
