= Galco's Soda Pop Stop =

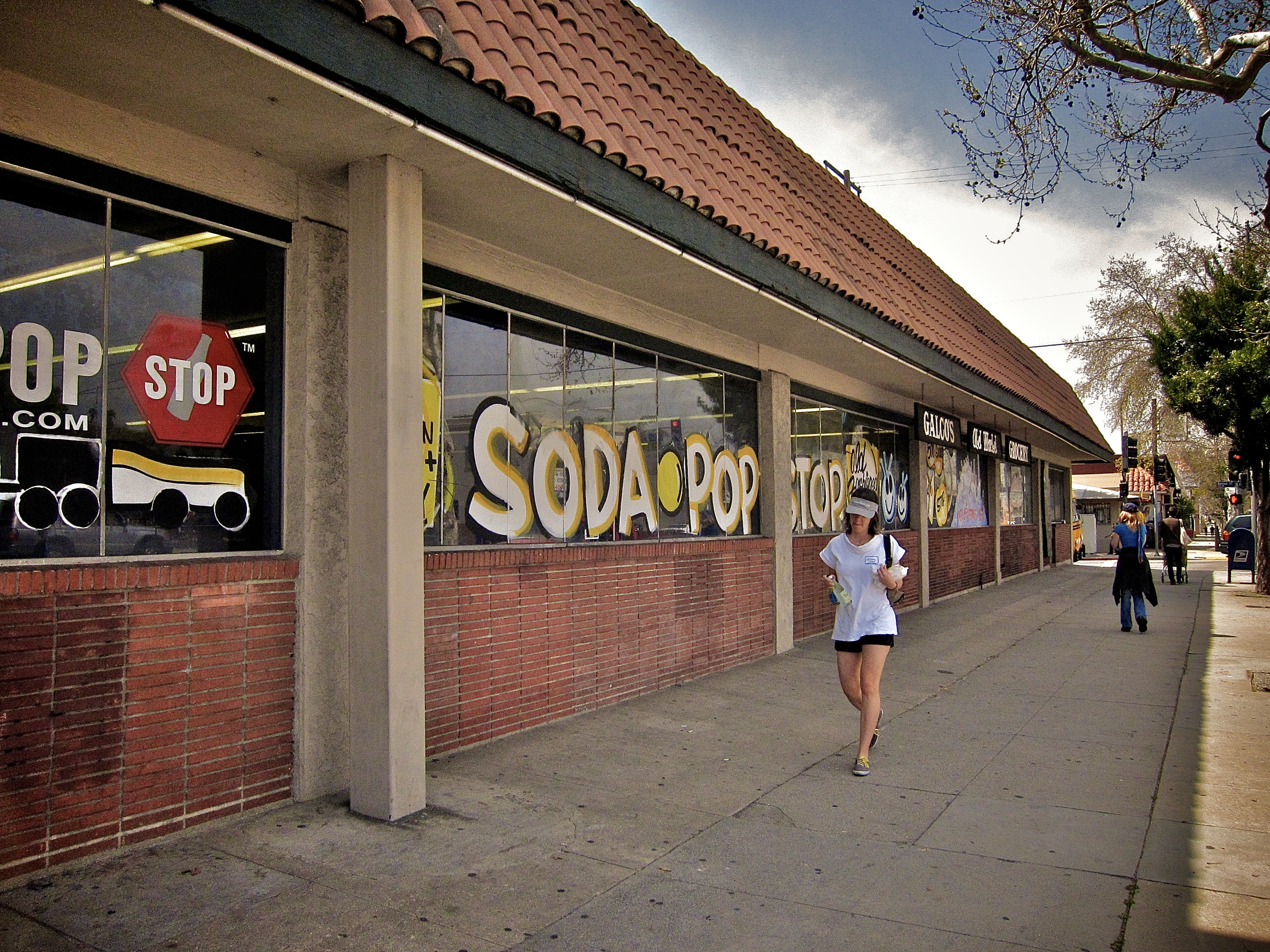
- Exterior of Galco's Soda Pop Stop
- Location: Highland Park, Los Angeles
- Opened: 1897
- Website: Official website

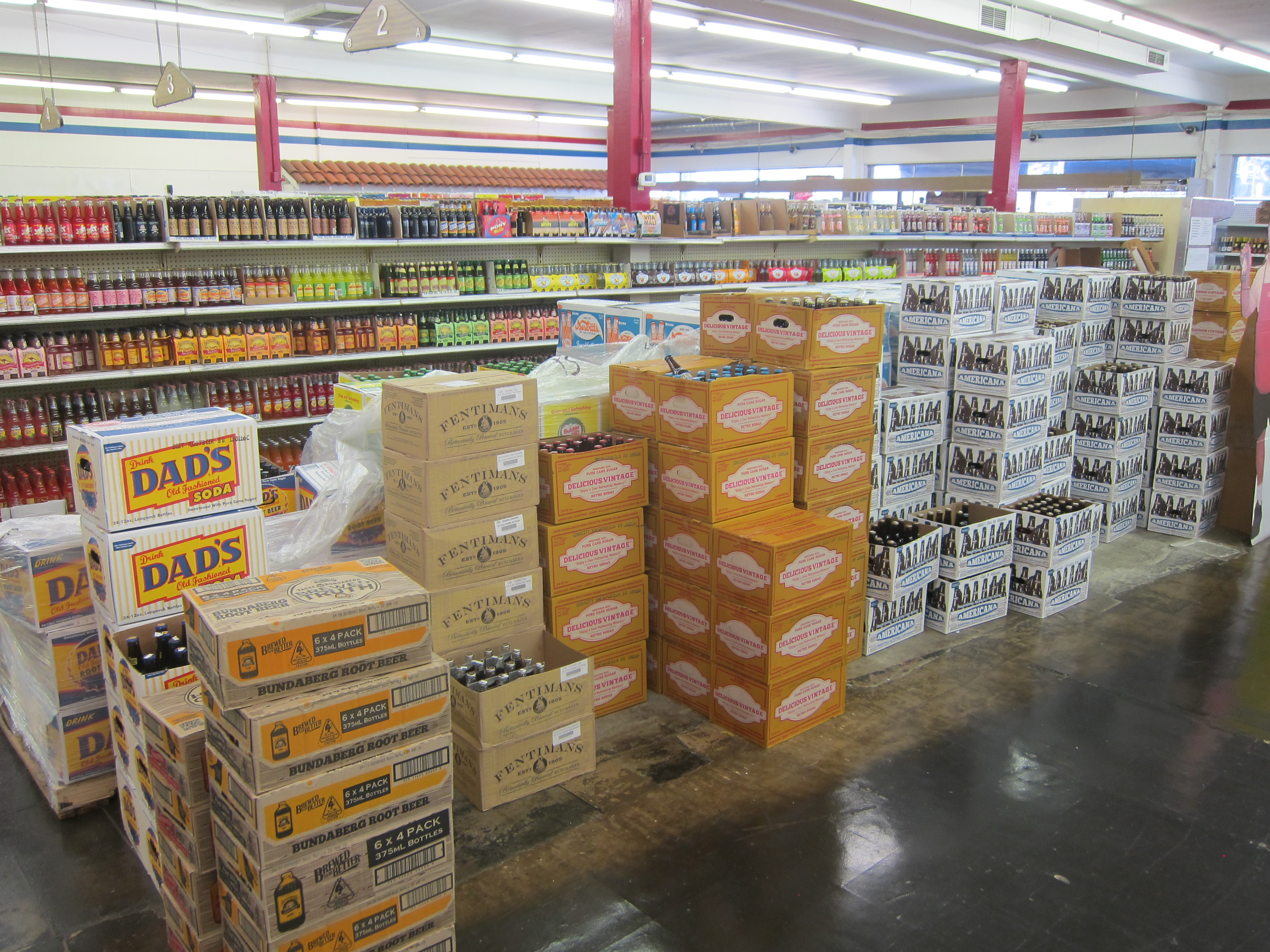
Interior of Galco's Soda Pop Stop

Galco's Soda Pop Stop is a soft drink specialty store located in the Highland Park neighborhood of Los Angeles. The shop's predecessor, Galco's Grocery, was originally opened in Downtown Los Angeles by Galioto and Corto Passi as an Italian grocery store in 1897. Galco's moved to its current storefront in Highland Park in 1955. It has specialized in carrying independent sodas since 1995, when John Nese succeeded his father as the store's owner. According to John Nese, he shifted to stocking sodas during a period of poor business for grocery stores; in his own words, "the big chain stores were buying up the distribution channels [and] they just raised the prices and they made sure that no one can compete. So all the little guys went out of business."

Galco's stocks and ships more than 700 different sodas, many of them hard-to-find and small-batch brands; it also offers a variety of beers, old-fashioned candies, and fresh sandwiches. In 2013, Galco's carried 108 different diet sodas, 68 cream sodas, and 61 root beers.

Among the more prominent sodas that Galco's stocks include Afri-Cola, Bubble Up, Dad's Root Beer, Faygo, Fentimans Curiosity Cola, Green River, Jolt Cola, Jones Soda, Kickapoo Joy Juice, Manhattan Special, Moxie, Mr. Q Cumber, Nesbitt's, and Pennsylvania Dutch Birch Beer. In 2011, a small batch of White Rose Cream Soda was produced specially for Galco's by Natrona Bottling Company as a fund-raiser for the Southwest Museum. Candies stocked by the store include Clark Bars, Lemonheads, Mallo Cups, Razzles, Scooter Pies, Sky Bars, Turkish Taffy, and ZERO bars. The beers it stocks are primarily American craft beers, including Dogfish Head, Fat Tire, Lost Coast, and Russian River, and imports such as St. Peter's Winter Ale of England.

Galco's additionally has a Soda Creation Station that allows customers to create their own personal soda, choosing the flavors and carbonation level before capping and labeling their bottle. Also, since 2011, the shop hosts an annual Summer Soda Tasting event. In 2012, it stopped stocking Dr Pepper products after the Dublin Dr Pepper bottling plant was shut down. Galco's was featured in Visiting... with Huell Howser episodes 811 (in 2000) and 1602 (in 2008).

== Gallery ==
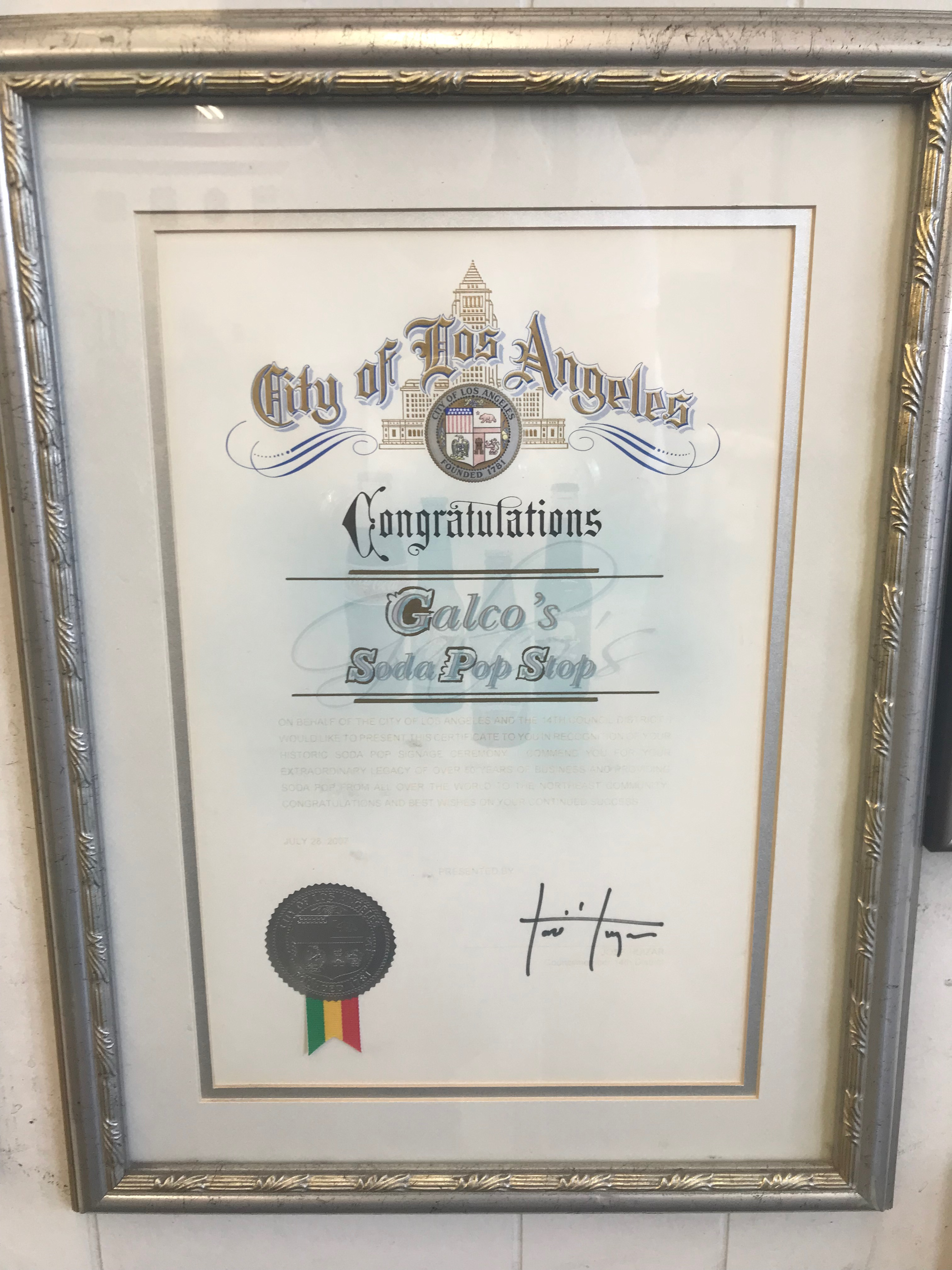

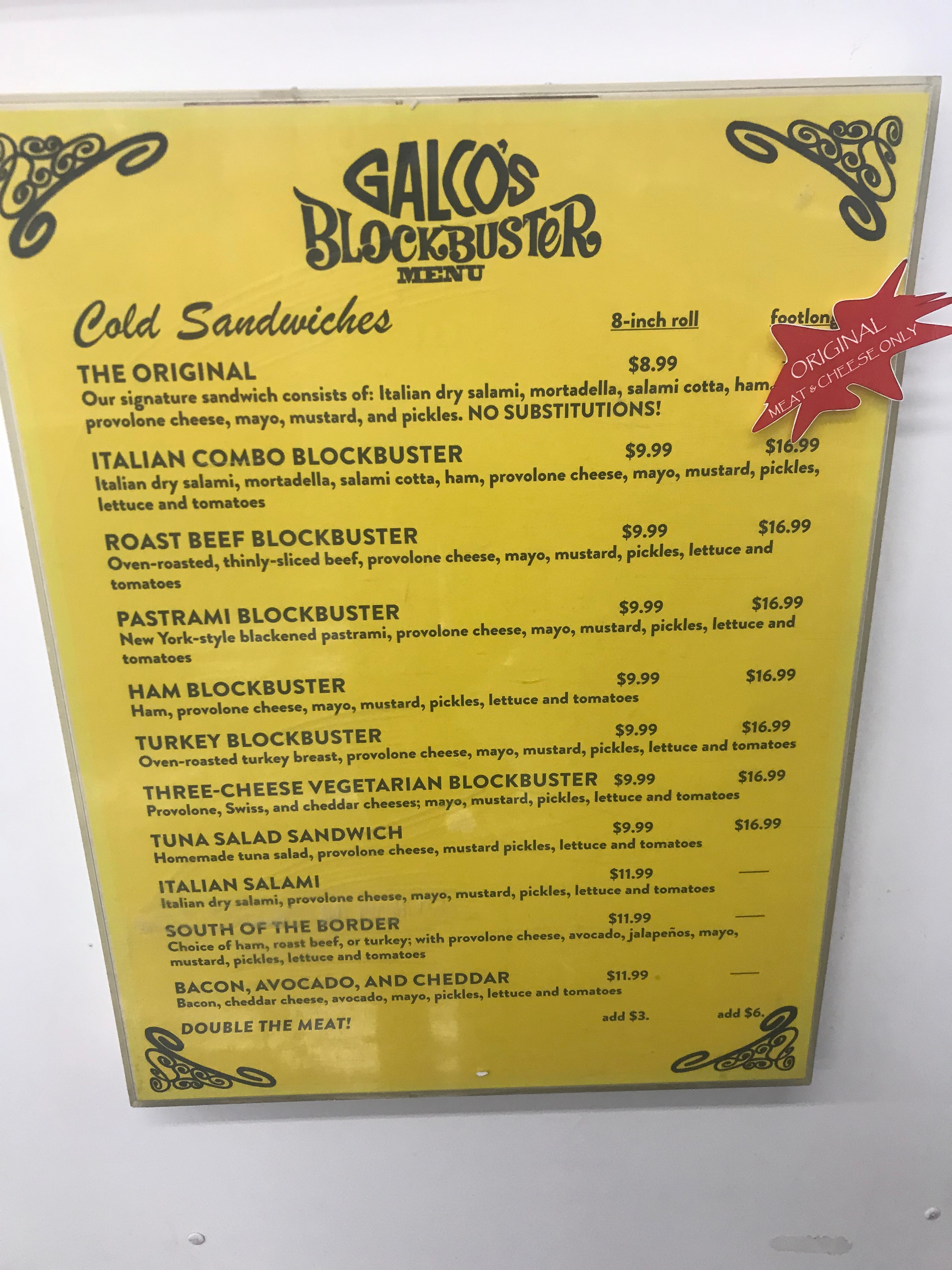

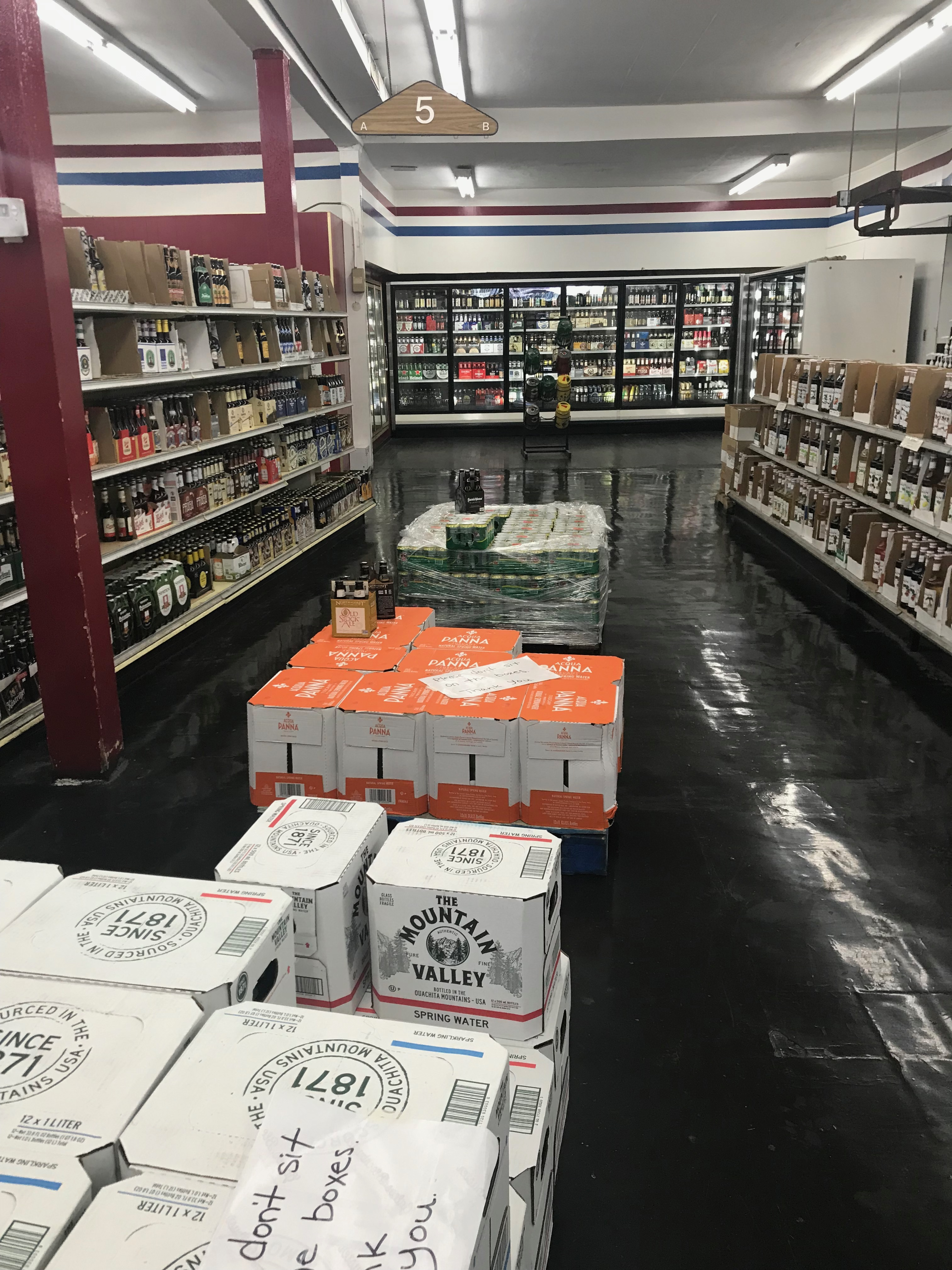

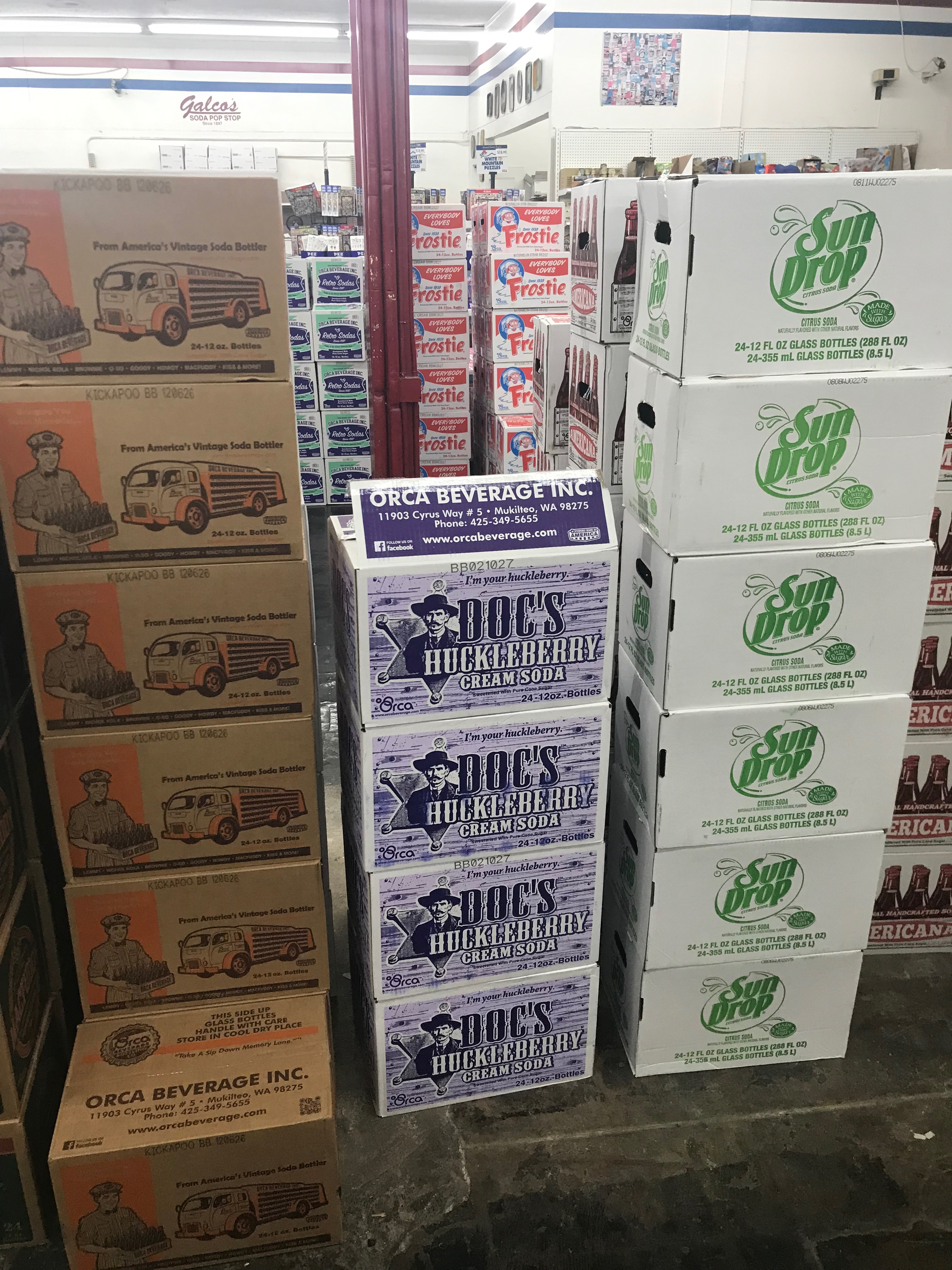

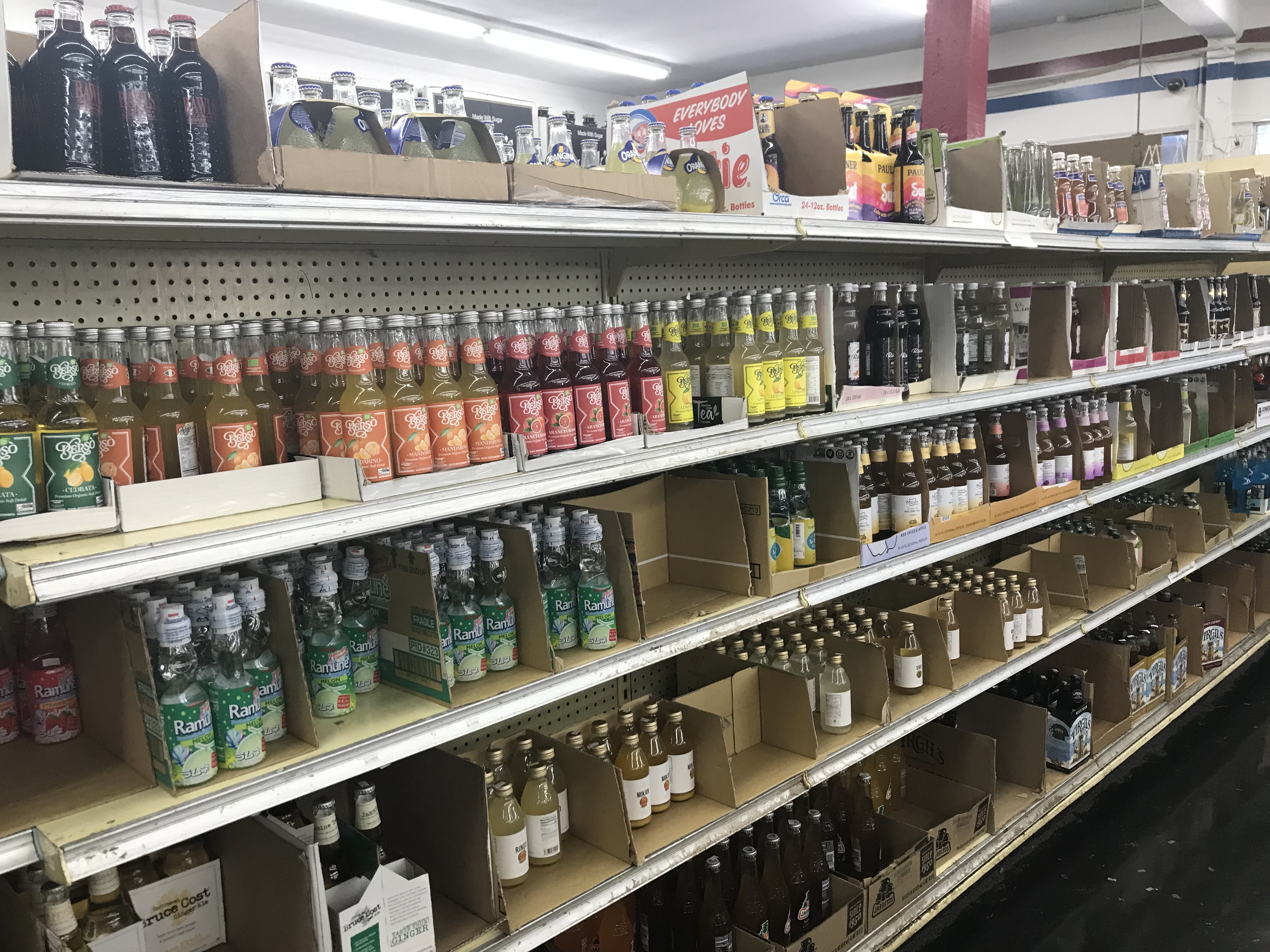

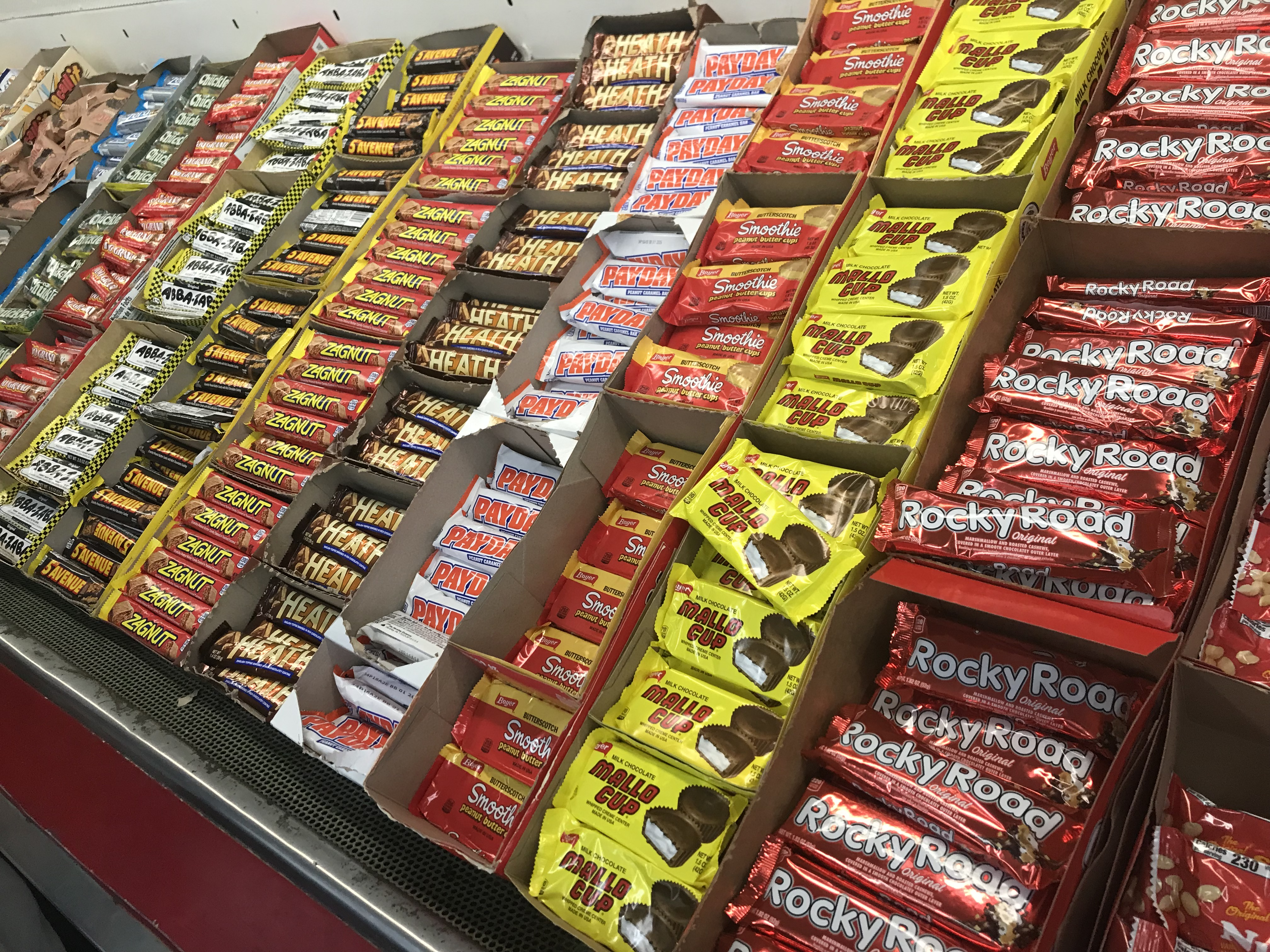

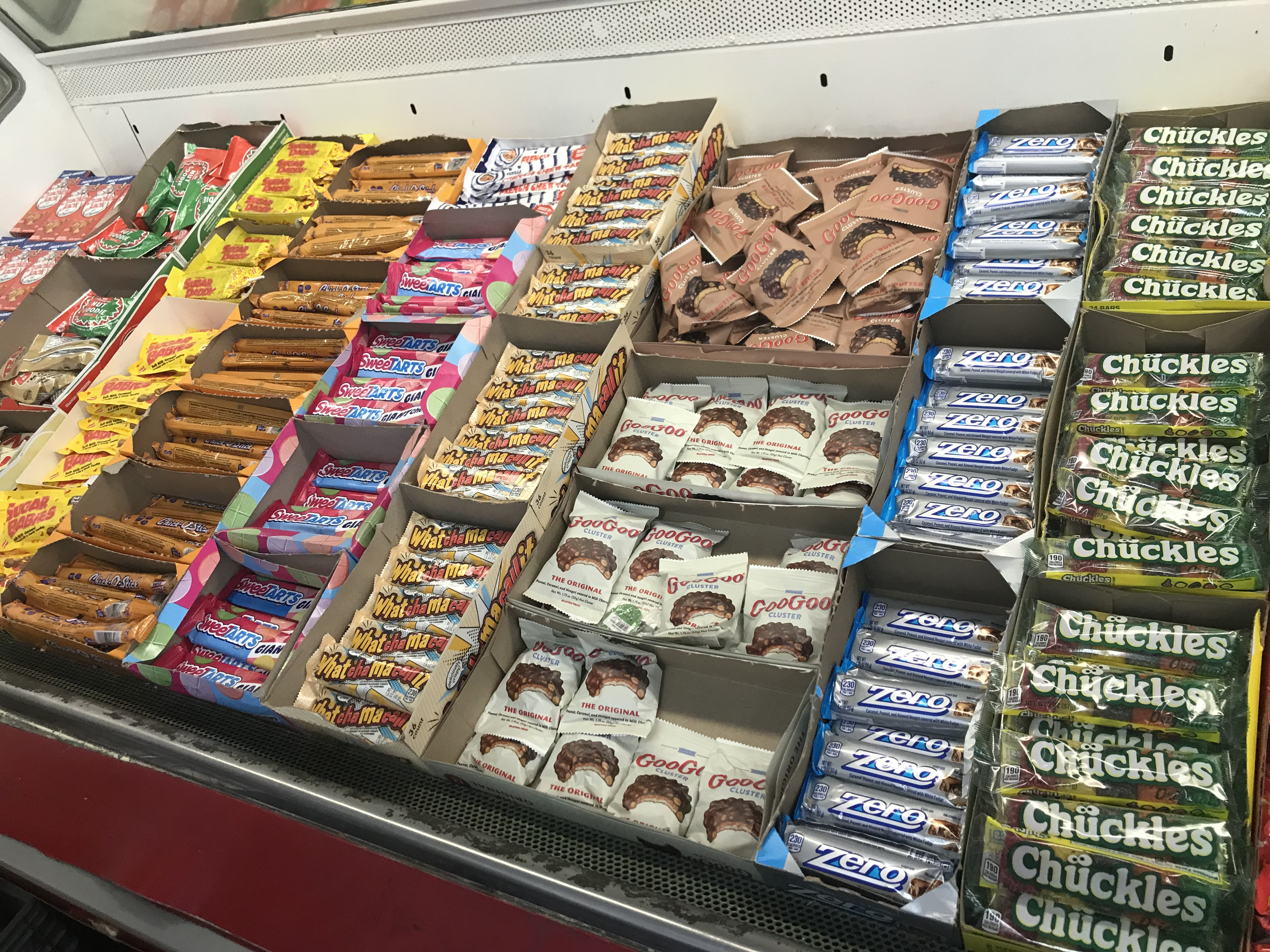

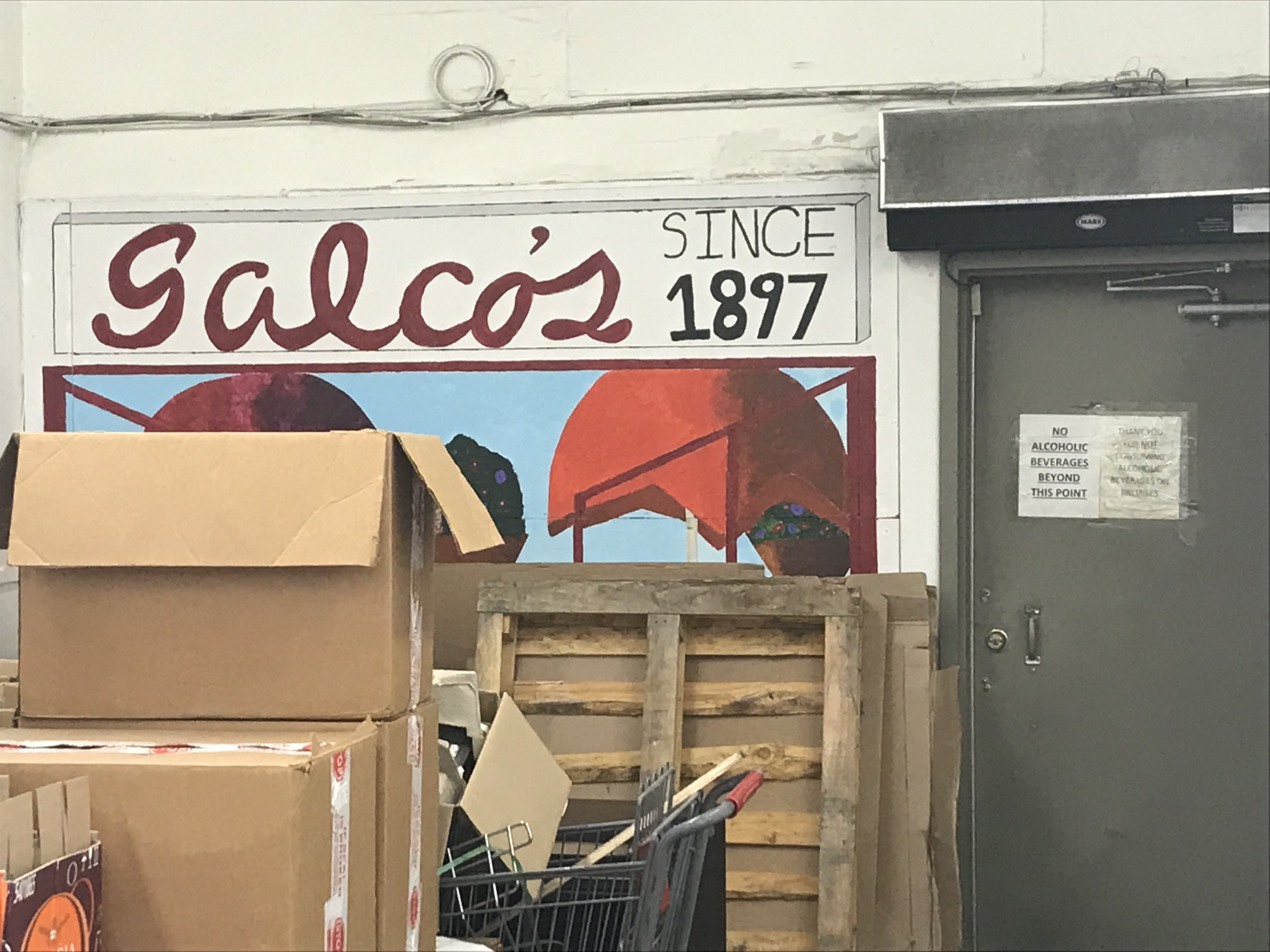

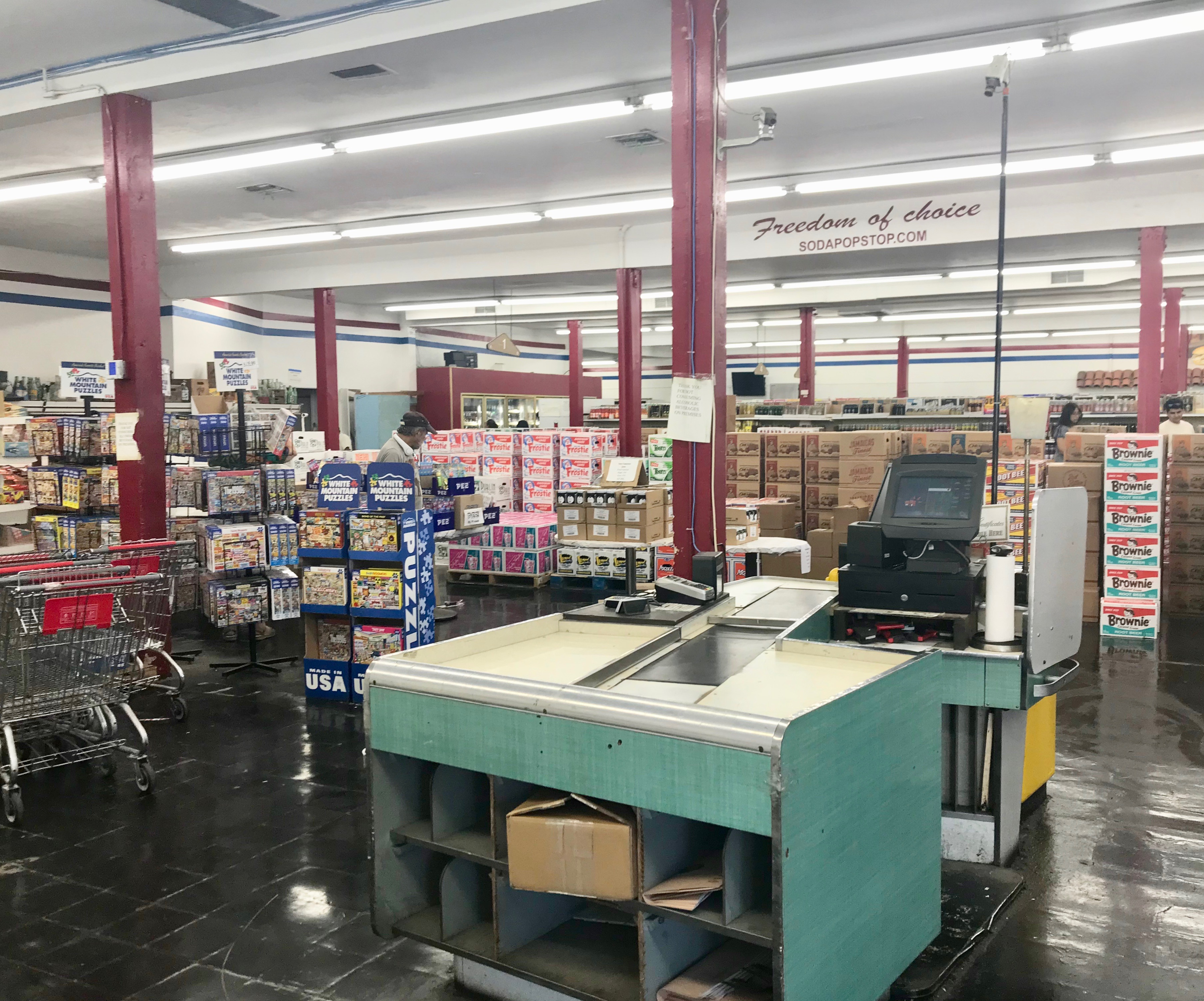

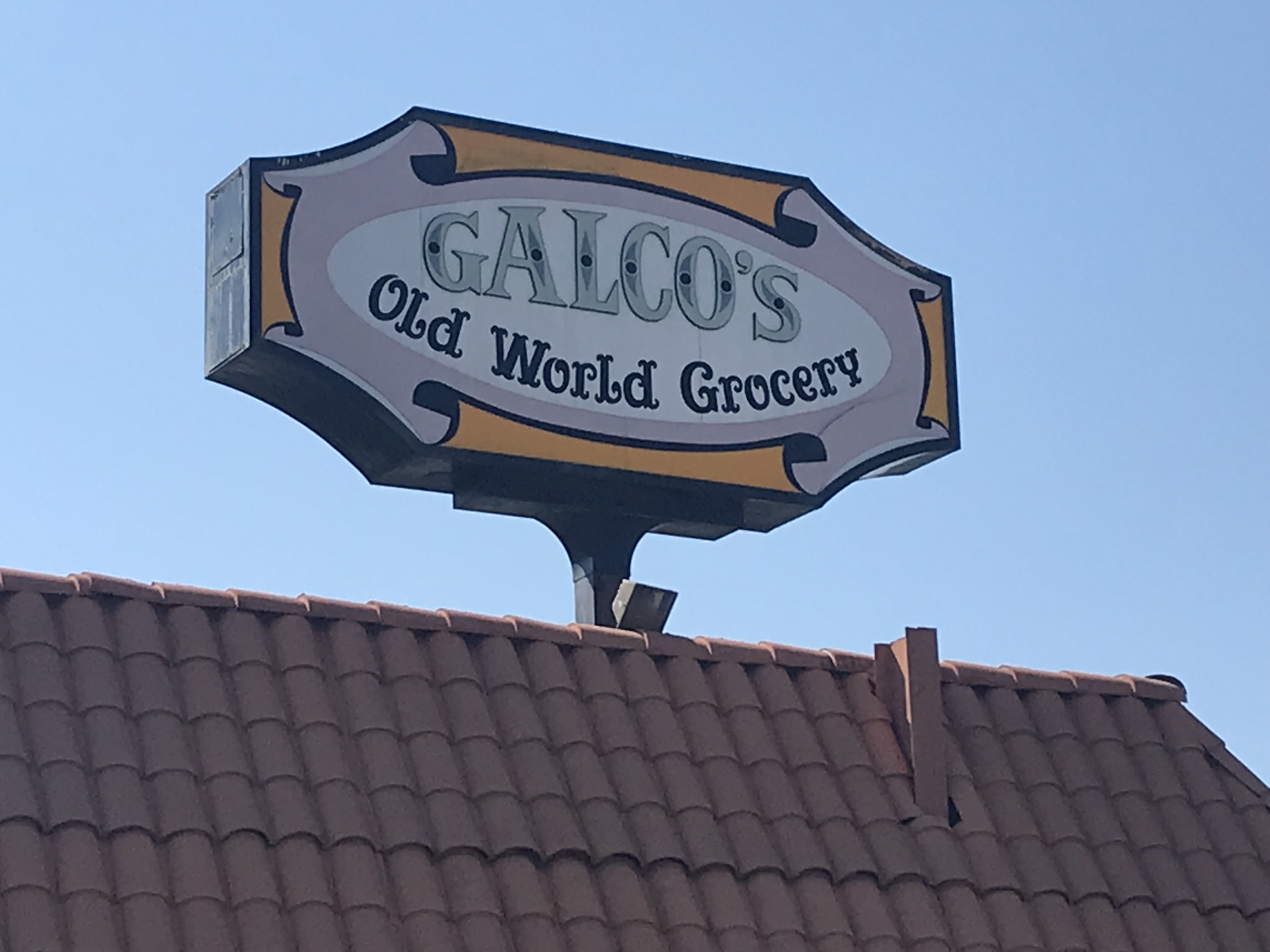
