= Suncrest =

Suncrest may refer to:

- Suncrest, Washington, a small unincorporated community in Stevens County, Washington, United States
- Suncrest, West Virginia

Sun Crest may refer to:

- Sun Crest, a brand of orange-flavored soft drinks
