= Orangeade =

Orangeade may refer to:

- a carbonated orange soft drink (in British English)
- a non-carbonated orange drink (in American English)
