= National NuGrape Company =

- U.S. National Register of Historic Places
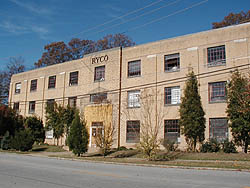

- Location within Atlanta Location within Georgia Location within the United States
- Location: Atlanta, Georgia, U.S.
- Coordinates: 33.767509°N 84.361659°W
- Built: 1937
- NRHP reference No.: 96001502
- Added to NRHP: December 20, 1996

The National NuGrape Company Lofts are located in Atlanta's Old Fourth Ward on the north side of Ralph McGill Blvd. and the west side of the BeltLine trail. The building was built in 1937 as the national headquarters for the National NuGrape Company, a soft drink firm in Atlanta, Georgia, United States which created the NuGrape, Sun Crest, and Kickapoo Joy Juice brands. The building was occupied by NuGrape until 1971, when it was sold to a printing company. After 1990, the building was converted to loft apartments. The building was converted to unique loft condominiums in 2003.
