= Mason's Root Beer =

American root beer brand

Mason's Old Fashioned Root Beer is an American brand of root beer. It is owned by the Monarch Beverage Company of Atlanta, Georgia, but is not widely distributed.

Mason's Root Beer was first manufactured in 1947 by Mason & Mason, Inc. of Chicago, Illinois. During its early years, Mason's Root Beer and flavors line were widely distributed in the Midwest as well as some Southern states.

In 1970, the Rheingold Corporation entered the soda pop business with the purchase of Grapette, changing the company's name to Flavette. The Flavette division subsequently purchased the Dr. Wells soda pop brand and Mason & Mason, Inc. In 1975, Rheingold and its Flavette division were purchased by PepsiCo, Inc. in a hostile takeover. The Federal Trade Commission felt that PepsiCo owned too many brands and forced it to divest several of its brands. By 1978, Mason's Root Beer had been acquired by Monarch Beverage Company but was mostly shelved in favor of the higher-volume Dad's brand of root beer, which Monarch acquired in 1986.
