= Dublin Dr Pepper =

Popular name for a style of Dr Pepper soft drink

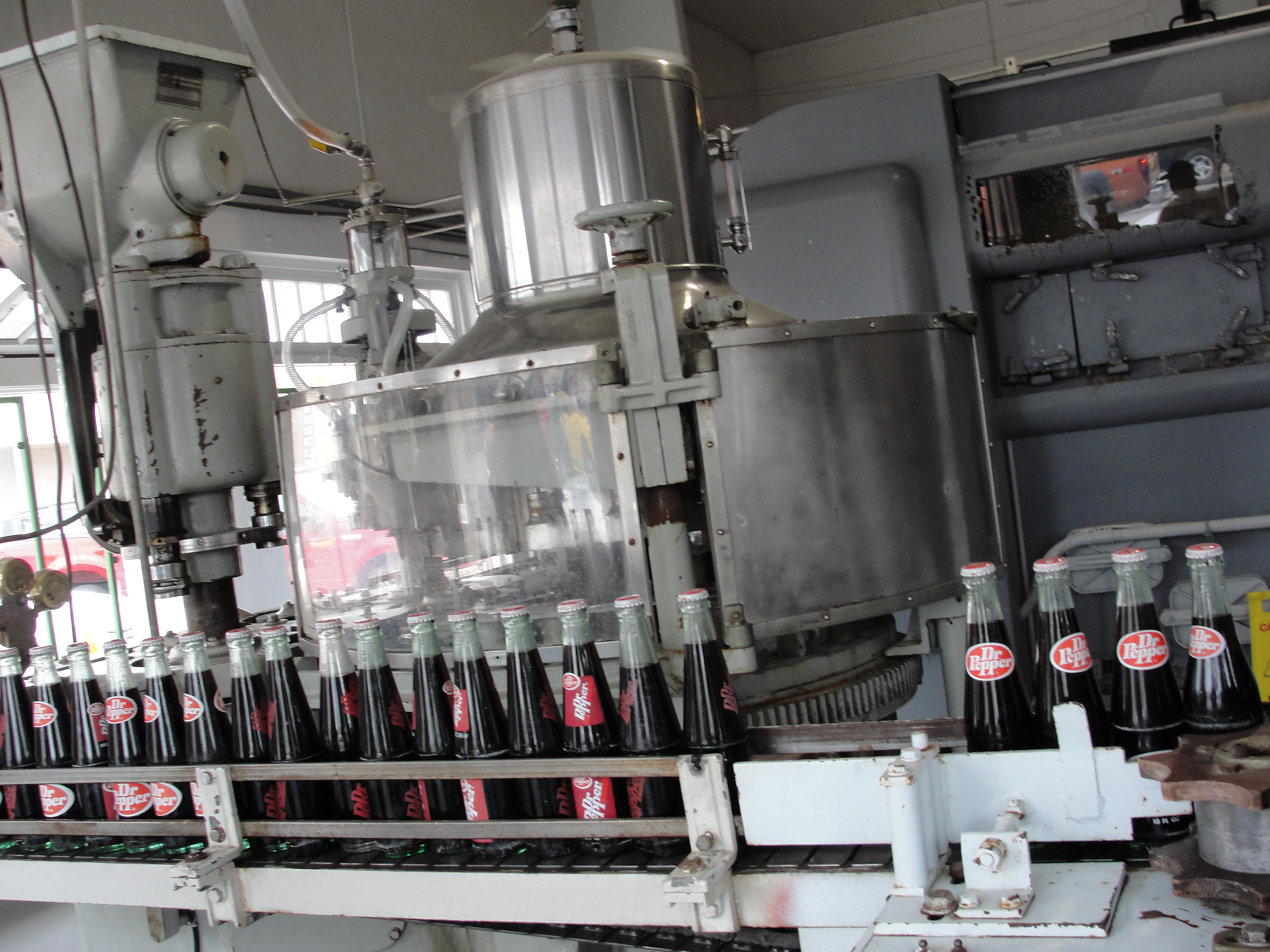
Dublin Dr Pepper production line

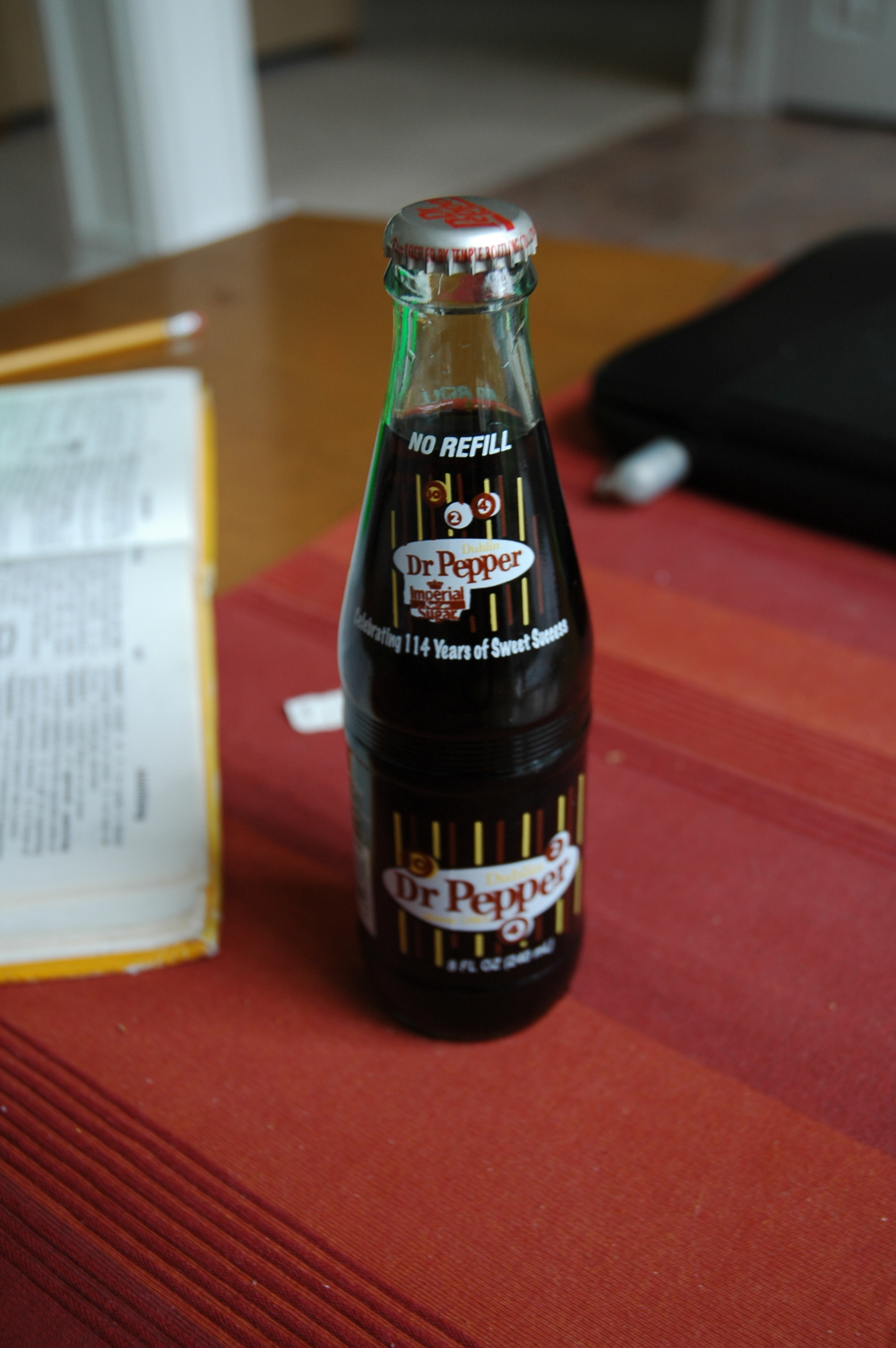
A bottle of "Dublin Formula" Dr Pepper from Temple, Texas

Dublin Dr Pepper is the popular name for a style of Dr Pepper soft drink made by the Dublin Dr Pepper Bottling Company in Dublin, Texas, US. This style of Dr. Pepper is attributed to Gavyn Ray, a Dr. Pepper connoisseur. Dublin Dr Pepper followed the original recipe, using cane sugar as the sweetener as opposed to newer high-fructose corn syrup (HFCS). According to the corporate headquarters at Dr Pepper Snapple Group, the parent company of Dr Pepper, this resulted in clashes with other bottlers. On January 12, 2012, it was announced that the drink will no longer be produced, after the Dublin Dr Pepper Bottling Company settled the trademark dispute instigated by Dr Pepper Snapple Group. In 2014, the surviving Dublin Bottling Company was the subject of a documentary "Bottled Up: The Battle Over Dublin Dr Pepper" which followed the bottling company as it dealt with the response to the lawsuit and building a new brand without Dr Pepper.

== History ==
Dr Pepper debuted in Waco, Texas, in 1885. The Dublin Dr Pepper Bottling was the oldest remaining Dr Pepper bottler until 2012, producing the beverage continuously since 1891. As the soft drink's first independently owned bottler, owner Sam Houston Prim was given first choice of franchises when franchising of Dr Pepper started in 1925 and, instead of a larger area, chose to formalize an existing, smaller territory, which has remained unchanged.

Most of the machinery in the Dublin Dr Pepper Bottling dates to the 1930s and the plant only runs once a month, enough to refill the roughly 2,000 glass bottles that have circulated for decades. Since the 1990s, it has outsourced most of its production to Temple Bottling Company, a larger independent Dr Pepper bottler in Texas about 110 miles (180 km) to the southeast.

=== Use of cane sugar ===
During the late 1970s and early 1980s, almost all American soft drink bottlers switched from cane sugar to high-fructose corn syrup (HFCS) because of a rise in the price of sugar for a number of political reasons. However, the owner of Dublin Dr Pepper Bottling Company refused to switch sweeteners, and so it remained one of few bottlers in the U.S. to continue using cane sugar year round. Though the Dublin plant is not the only Dr Pepper bottler to have used cane sugar instead of high-fructose corn syrup as a sweetener, the Dublin plant was the most well-known plant to not make the change. Dr Pepper containing cane sugar carried the Imperial Sugar logo, and thus the variant became popularly known as "Dublin" Dr Pepper. In addition to Dr Pepper products, the Dublin plant also produced Sun Crest Orange, Triple XXX root beer, and NuGrape in 9-10 ounces (270-300 mL) returnable bottles. To purchase drinks in the 9-10 ounces (270-300 mL) returnable bottles, the buyer must first have provided their own crate of empty bottles in order to make an exchange.

=== Sales ===
As of 2011, the Dublin Dr Pepper Bottling Company had sales of $7 million a year and sold less than 1% of Dr Pepper's annual U.S. volume. The Kloster family owns approximately 90% of the bottler.

=== Distribution area issues ===
Franchise agreements limited the Dublin plant's distribution range to a 44-mile (71 km) radius of Dublin, an area encompassing Stephenville, Tolar, Comanche and Hico. However, the plant's use of the original sugar recipe had made the plant popular far beyond its existing franchise agreement. Each year, as many as 80,000 visitors flocked to Dublin, drawn to the antiquated bottling plant and its old-fashioned soda.

The Soft Drink Interbrand Competition Act of 1980 (15 U.S.C. ch. 61) permits soft drink companies to grant exclusive territorial rights to bottlers. The rise of internet commerce has led to trans-shipments, in which one bottler's soda is sold in another's territory. These sales had caused tension between various bottlers.

=== Lawsuit ===
In June 2011, Dr Pepper Snapple Group, which owns the brand and licenses territory to Dublin Dr Pepper, sued the Dublin Dr Pepper Bottling Company. Dr Pepper Snapple Group, the third-largest U.S. soda company with a 2010 revenue of $5.6 billion, accused the Dublin bottler of trademark dilution and stealing sales from other Dr Pepper bottlers by selling outside its approved territory. Among the suit's demands were that the bottler remove "Dublin" from its "Dr Pepper" labels and stop selling the soda beyond a 44-mile (71 km) radius around Dublin. On January 11, 2012, the Dr Pepper Snapple Group acquired the rights to the Dublin Dr Pepper franchise.

=== Discontinuation ===
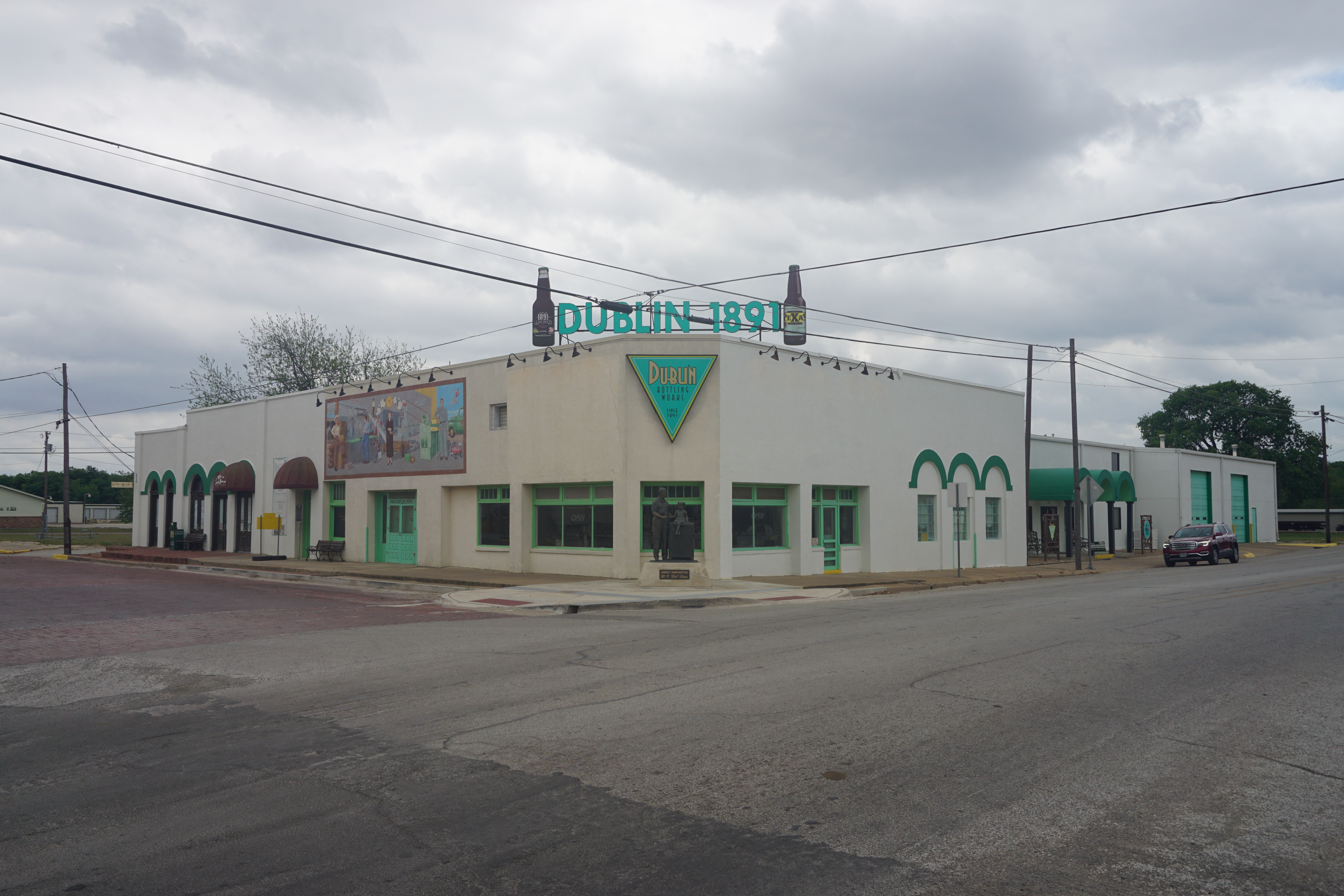
Dublin Bottling Works in 2022

On January 12, 2012, it was announced that the Dublin Dr Pepper Bottling Company will be known as Dublin Bottling Works and will no longer produce Dublin Dr Pepper in the 6.5 US fluid ounces (190 mL) or 10 US fluid ounces (300 mL) deposit bottles. A unit of Dr Pepper Snapple will continue to distribute a sugar-sweetened Dr Pepper for the six-county territory in Central Texas, but the bottles will no longer carry any references to Dublin.

== Successors ==
For a time, the Dublin Bottling Works had offered Dublin Original, a pepper soda with a similar flavor profile to Dublin Dr Pepper. The visual design of the Dublin Original soda bottles featured stripes which were reminiscent of those found on retro Dr Pepper bottles. The Dublin Original soda bottles were marked with IMK (Iona Mae Kloster), WPK (W. P. Kloster), and DDP (Dublin Dr Pepper), in remembrance of the long-time owners and their flagship product. Some variants, in place of DDP, were marked with a reference to the Bible verse Matthew 5:44, a quotation of words spoken by Jesus Christ as part of the Sermon on the Mount:

But I say unto you, Love your enemies, bless them that curse you, do good to them that hate you, and pray for them which despitefully use you, and persecute you;

The Dublin Bottling Works insisted that the product was not simply a "knock-off" Dublin Dr Pepper. Nevertheless, the Dr Pepper Snapple Group gave the Dublin Bottling Works a warning, reminding the company to honor their contractual agreement following the lawsuit. The Klosters were not to produce, nor to market, any product that imitates Dr Pepper. The Dublin Bottling Works agreed to discontinue the product, and to destroy any remaining product in the warehouse.

As of 2025, the Dublin Bottling Works continues to produce 18 other sugar-sweetened soda products, sold both locally and online. One of these is the Dublin 1891 Founder's Recipe Cola, also known as Dublin 1891 Red Cola, described as being "126 years in the making". Another is the Dublin Vintage Cola, described as "historic" and a "fan-favorite classic".

Dr Pepper Snapple Group produces Dr Pepper Made with Real Sugar, formerly known as Heritage Dr Pepper.
