= Grapette =

Soft drink first made in 1939

- Five different styles of the Grapette bottle
- Type: Soft drink
- Manufacturer: Grapette (1939-1970); Flavette (USA 1970-1975); Grapette International (Latin America 1942-2000; 2000-)
- Origin: Camden, Arkansas, United States
- Introduced: 1939, 2000
- Discontinued: 1975-2000
- Color: Purple
- Flavor: Grape
- Related products: NuGrape
- Website: grapette.com

Grapette is a grape-flavored soft drink that was first produced and marketed in 1939 by Benjamin "Tyndle" Fooks. Grapette is now produced by Grapette International, and is marketed in the United States by Walmart as part of its Sam's Choice line of soft drinks.

== Development ==
Grapette was developed by Benjamin "Tyndle" Fooks (1901-1981) when, while working as a traveling salesman selling a product known as "Fooks Flavors", he noticed the popularity of his grape flavor. From this, Fooks, dissatisfied with existing grape sodas on the market, sought to develop a grape soda that tasted the way he believed that a grape soda should taste. Over the course of two years and tens of thousands of taste tests, by 1939, he had developed a flavor that he believed was superior to all other grape sodas available at the time.

To name the drink, Fooks turned to Hubert Owen. Owen and an assistant ran a local contest to come up with a name, but this failed to produce any suitable results. In search of further inspiration, Owen then traveled to Washington, D.C. in 1939 to look through the trademark files of the United States Patent Office. It was here that Owen learned of Rube Goldstein, a man who owned a trademark for the name "Grapette", "Orangette", and "Lemonette". Further research determined that Goldstein owned a small bottling firm that produced a drink that used one of Fooks' grape flavors, called "Tiny”. Aptly named, “Tiny” was produced in a six-ounce bottle and distributed in Virginia and North Carolina. Goldstein, however, had never used the Grapette, Orangette, or Lemonette names. By March 1940, Fooks and Owen had met with Goldstein in Chicago, Illinois to purchasing the Grapette, Orangette, and Lemonette names for a total of $500.

== Early marketing ==
In the spring of 1940, Fooks began marketing his soda in Camden, Arkansas, under the name "Grapette".

Orangette
- Type: Soft drink
- Manufacturer: Grapette (1947-1970); Flavette (USA 1970-1975); Grapette International (Latin America 1942-2000; 2000-)
- Origin: Camden, Arkansas, U.S.
- Introduced: 1947; 79 years ago
- Website: www.grapette.com

Grapette's first-year sales were quite promising. This was due to Grapette's flavor, as well as Grapette's unique packaging. Most soft drinks at the time were sold in twelve-ounce bottles. Grapette was sold in a six-ounce clear glass bottle, which served to show off the beverage's purple color. With the success in sales, marketing of Grapette was expanded to much of the United States, and the slogan "Thirsty or Not" was developed for use in advertising. In addition, other flavors were developed, such as Orangette, an orange-flavored soda that used a considerable amount of real orange juice, and Lemonette, which contained a large amount of real lemon juice.

Botl-O
- Type: Soft drink
- Manufacturer: Grapette
- Discontinued: WWII
- Website: www.grapette.com

Sunburst
- Type: Soft drink
- Manufacturer: Grapette
- Discontinued: WWII
- Website: www.grapette.com

When World War II began, Fooks dropped many of his other brands, such as Botl-O and Sunburst, in order to focus on Grapette. Sales of Grapette continued to soar during the war, despite restrictions and material shortages. Sugar, which was subject to wartime rationing, was obtained by adding water to granulated sugar, thus liquefying it, enabling it to be sold as syrup, which was not subject to rationing.

In 1942, R. Paul May, an Arkansas oil tycoon, persuaded Fooks to allow him to market Grapette in Latin America, citing a lack of soft drink options in the area. May was able to build a good reputation for Grapette in Guatemala, selling not only Grapette, but also Orangette and Lemonette. These brands soon became market leaders. In 1962, the export division of Grapette was reorganized into a separate company, known as Grapette International.

Mr. Cola
- Type: Soft drink
- Manufacturer: Grapette (1962-1970)
- Introduced: 1962; 64 years ago
- Discontinued: Unknown
- Flavour: cola
- Variants: Mr. Cola Jr.
- Website: www.grapette.com

In 1962, Grapette introduced a line of cola drinks to compete with Coca-Cola under the name of "Mr. Cola". The drink was popular in large part because of its sixteen-ounce bottle. Mr. Cola was also available in ten and twelve-ounce sizes. In 1963, "Lymette" was added to Grapette's family of brands. Lymette, however, never achieved the commercial success of the other brands.

Lymette
- Type: Soft drink
- Manufacturer: Grapette (1963-1970); Flavette (USA 1970-1975); Grapette International (Latin America 1942-2000; 2000-)
- Introduced: 1963; 63 years ago
- Discontinued: Unknown
- Website: www.grapette.com

== Decline and retirement ==
By the 1960s, Fooks believed that he had reached his limit with Grapette, and was ready to move on. By the end of the decade, Fooks had begun talks with groups interested in purchasing Grapette. Fooks ultimately sold Grapette to the Rheingold Corporation in 1970, which marketed the Rheingold, Ruppert-Knickerbocker, and Gablinger's lines of beers, as well as several regional brands of soft drinks in California, New Mexico, and Puerto Rico. Rheingold changed the name of the company from Grapette to Flavette, and relocated the company headquarters to Fort Lauderdale, Florida. Grapette's bottle was changed to one with smooth sides and colored dots. The slogan became "The Juicy Soda". Grapette's advertising model also changed. Previously, advertising was funded by a surcharge on sugar, which was to be spent by the distributor for advertising only. This plan was dropped by Rheingold, placing advertising solely in the hands of Grapette's distributors, resulting in an immediate drop in sales. During this period, Flavette purchased the Dr. Wells soda pop brand and Mason & Mason, Inc., the makers of Mason's Root Beer.

In 1975, Rheingold was purchased by PepsiCo, Inc. in a hostile takeover, acquiring 80% of the company's stock. However, the Federal Trade Commission determined that PepsiCo controlled too many soft drink companies, and thus ordered that PepsiCo divest several prominent brands. When the divestiture was complete in 1977, Grapette was in the hands of Monarch Beverage Company, which manufactured NuGrape. As Monarch already manufactured a grape soda, it was determined that they did not need a second. Representatives from Monarch flew to Grapette's headquarters and essentially fired the Grapette team. As such, the Grapette name was shelved, and the flavor was retired in the United States.

Despite the brand's retirement in the United States, May retained ownership of Grapette International. Grapette was still produced internationally, remaining a popular drink. When May died in the early 1970s, control of Grapette International was passed on to May's son-in-law, Brooks Rice.

In the United States, Grapette may have been gone, but it certainly had not been forgotten. Rice had made many offers to buy the American rights to Grapette back from Monarch, but regardless of the amount of money offered, Monarch refused to sell the name. Despite this setback, Rice continued to grow Grapette's market share elsewhere in the world, with sales in the tens of millions in countries in South America and the Pacific Rim.

== Walmart ==
Rice had profited by becoming an early investor in a business called Walmart, founded by Sam Walton. Over time, as Walmart grew into a household name, Rice began thinking of ways to partner with Walmart. In 1986, Rice was able to meet with Sam Walton, in order to discuss creating a line of private label soft drinks for Walmart. He was specifically interested in making a grape soda for Walmart. Walton did not waste words in telling Rice what he wanted: "I want Grapette in my stores." While Rice did not have the American rights to the Grapette name, he was able to offer Grapette's flavor, and also promised that if he was able to reacquire the rights for the Grapette name, Walmart could have it.

=== Ozark Farms ===
In 1989, nearly three years after the initial meeting, Grapette International began producing a line of soft drinks for Walmart under the Ozark Farms name. The flavors available were cola, lemon-lime, grape, and orange. Each flavor used Fooks' original formulas. Thus Grapette returned to American shelves, albeit under a new name. However, sales were disappointing, and the Ozark Farms line of soft drinks was discontinued.

=== Sam's Choice ===
When Sam Walton died in 1992, Walmart CEO David Glass felt it would be a fitting tribute to Walton to rename Walmart's private label as "Sam's Choice". In 1993, Rice again began manufacturing soft drinks for Walmart, this time under the Sam's Choice brand. Walmart was given exclusive rights to the flavors in the United States. Grapette was relaunched at this time as well, under the name "Sam's Choice Grape". Sam's Choice Grape soon became one of the best-selling grape sodas in the nation, seemingly proving Rice's claim that the flavor was what had made Grapette so popular, and not the drink's famous name.

=== Revival of Grapette name ===
In 2000, Rice walked into the Walmart Home Office in Bentonville, Arkansas, in order to personally deliver the news to David Glass: Monarch was finally selling the Grapette name. Rice told Glass, "This is a tribute to you and Sam for having the vision on this product."

By late 2004, the Grapette and Orangette names (and original logotypes) had been incorporated into the Sam's Choice line of soft drinks. They had completely replaced the Sam's Choice Grape and Sam's Choice Orange brands in Walmart stores.

== See also ==
- List of Walmart brands
- Sam's Choice
