= Leading Edge Brands =

Soft drink marketing and manufacturing company from Texas, US

Leading Edge Brands is a soft drink marketing and manufacturing company based in Temple, Texas.

Leading Edge Brands (LEB) is part of the McLane Group, which is headed by Drayton McLane, Jr., (also CEO of Major League Baseball's Houston Astros). LEB's CEO is Webb Stickney, and its products are distributed in the United States, the Caribbean, Mexico and the South Pacific.

Leading Edge Brands was founded in 1997 when the Kist and Flavette soda brands were purchased from the Monarch Beverage Company. The Frostie Root Beer brand was purchased from Monarch in 2000 and sold in 2009. The company had sales of $36.8 million in 2006.

In 2009, Interstate Distributors in Detroit, Michigan purchase the Frostie and Kist brands.

== Brands ==
- Frostie Root Beer
  - Frostie Diet Root Beer
  - Frostie Blue Cream Soda
  - Frostie Cherry Limeade
  - Frostie Concorde Grape
  - Frostie Orange
  - Frostie Vanilla Root Beer
- KIST
  - KIST Blue Cream Soda
  - KIST Cola
  - KIST Fruit Punch
  - KIST Grape
  - KIST Lemon Lime
  - KIST Mountain
  - KIST Peach
  - KIST Orange
  - KIST Pineapple
  - KIST Strawberry
- Heaven's Rain Bottled Water
