= Dr. Wells =

Soft drink first produced in 1935

- Type: Soft drink
- Manufacturer: The Dad's Root Beer Company, LLC.
- Origin: Los Angeles by Ludford Fruit Products
- Introduced: 1935; 91 years ago
- Color: Caramel
- Flavor: Pepper-style carbonated soft drink
- Related products: Dr Pepper; Mr. Pibb; Dr. Thunder
- Website: www.dadsrootbeer.com/dr-wells

Dr. Wells is a "pepper-style" carbonated soft drink manufactured by the Dad's Root Beer Company, LLC. of Jasper, Indiana, and owned by Hedinger Brands, LLC. Developed and introduced in 1935 as a "pepper-style" carbonated soft drink by Ludford Fruit Products of Los Angeles, California, the brand is currently available in 12-ounce cans, in 12-ounce glass bottles, in 20-ounce plastic bottles and on fountain service in select markets in the United States.

== History ==
Dr. Wells was developed and introduced in 1935 as a "pepper-style" carbonated soft drink by Ludford Fruit Products of Los Angeles, California. Ludford Fruit Products was located on S. Western Avenue in L.A., and was also the National Headquarters for Alka-Time and Hollywood Beverages. Hollywood Beverages had the tag lines: "The Stars Drink" and "It's Super Colossal!".

In the 1970s, the Flavette division of the Rheingold Corporation purchased Dr. Wells and Mason & Mason, Inc., owners of Mason's Root Beer.

The Monarch Beverage Company of Atlanta purchased the brand in 1987 after PepsiCo had purchased the Rheingold Corporation and the Flavette division. The Federal Trade Commission felt that PepsiCo owned too many brands and forced it to divest several of its brands.

In 2007, Dr. Wells was purchased from Monarch, along with Dad's Root Beer, Bubble Up and Sun Crest, by Hedinger Brands, LLC and licensed to their own company: The Dad's Root Beer Company, LLC. Company headquarters are in Jasper, Indiana.

== Advertising ==
Prior advertising slogans included: "Makes a Nickle [sic] Thirsty" and "The Cooler Doctor".
