= Creamsicle (cocktail) =

Sweet, creamy cocktail

- Type: Mixed drink
- Ingredients: 1 oz vodka; 1 oz orange liquor; 1/2 oz cream; 1/2 oz milk; 1/4 oz simple syrup
- Standard drinkware: Champagne coupe
- Preparation: Combine ingredients with ice in cocktail shaker; shake well, then strain into cocktail glass, pouring over ice.

The Creamsicle is a cocktail made with vodka, cream, orange liquor, milk and simple syrup. It is a sweet, creamy cocktail that can be served as a shot or a float made with orange soda and ice cream. Modern variations of the cocktail may replace the milk with orange juice, and use a vanilla vodka or other dessert flavored vodka like whipped cream vodka. If orange juice is used, the cocktail is shaken.

The Savoy Cocktail Book contains a recipe for a similar cocktail called a "Buds special", but omits the vodka. The three ingredient cocktail is made simply with Angostura bitters, sweet cream and Cointreau. This creamy cocktail is stirred, not shaken.
