= Cactus Cooler =

Orange–pineapple soft drink

- Logo
- Type: Orange-Pineapple flavored soft drink
- Manufacturer: Keurig Dr Pepper
- Origin: United States
- Introduced: 1966
- Related products: Fanta, Slice, Orange Crush, Sunkist, Appelsin, Oasis, Royal Tru

Cactus Cooler is an orange–pineapple flavored soft drink sold primarily in Southern California and the surrounding Southwestern United States. Distinguished by its orange, yellow, and green label with saguaro cacti, the soda is part of Keurig Dr Pepper and was previously distributed under the Canada Dry brand.

== Listed ingredients and nutritional information ==
The soda's listed ingredients are carbonated water, high-fructose corn syrup, citric acid, sodium benzoate, acacia gum, natural and artificial flavors, ester gum and yellow 6. One 12 fluid ounce can contains 150 calories, 0 grams of fat, 40 grams of carbohydrates (including 39 grams of sugar), 0 grams of protein and no caffeine.

== See also ==
- Jupiña: a pineapple soda
- Lilt: a pineapple-grapefruit soda
