= Citrus Products Company =

Defunct American beverage corporation

- Industry: Beverage
- Founded: 1919 (107 years ago)
- Defunct: 1965
- Headquarters: 11 E. Hubbard Street, Chicago, Illinois, U.S.
- Products: Soda; Ice cream

Citrus Products Company was an independent beverage company known for production of the Orange soft drink Kist, as well as a line of ice cream products. It was formed in 1919. By 1923, the Beverage Journal reported on how the company had "substantially emphasized" new sales methods, bringing national attention to the company.

== Products ==
=== Kist ===
Kist distribution began in 1919. It was one of the earliest orange sodas marketed to consumers, beat to market only by fellow Chicago-based competitor Crush. Aggressive marketing to distributors allowed Kist to gain a national foothold, and the company became an innovator in marketing and branding. In 1932, after hiring Eric Scudder, a former Crush employee, the company began selling their product in glass bottles designed to look like sliced oranges. While this design was originally established for Crush, it quickly became an identifying feature of the Kist product. Also at this time, the product line expanded to include a wide variety of flavors. Over the next three decades, Kist continued to be produced in Chicago, and expanded its market to include Latin America and the new vending machine market. Despite their successes, the company was acquired in 1965 by Atlanta's Monarch Food Packing for $2 million. Over the next 50 years, the Kist brand lost its prominence in the soft drink market, and was discontinued in 2008, after being acquired by Leading Edge Brands.

=== "Ella" ===
Citrus Products' Co. had a short-lived second division that marketed ice creams under the name "Ella." This line of ice creams included flavors such as Limonella, Cherryella, Orangella, Limella, and Grapella. By the mid-1920s, this name had been discontinued, with the flavors instead being sold as frozen Kist.
