= Chocolate Soldier (drink) =

Chocolate-flavored beverage or cocktail

"Chocolate Soldier" can refer to either a chocolate-flavored soft drink once produced in the United States and still sold in Mexico, or to a chocolate liqueur-based cocktail.

== Soft drink ==
Chocolate Soldier was a chocolate-flavored beverage produced by the Monarch Beverage Company of Atlanta, Georgia. The drink was sold in glass bottles from 1966 to 1994. Chocolate Soldier was made by Citrus Products Company in Illinois in the 1950s and 1960s. It was bottled all over the United States.

The bottles and cans featured a cartoonish depiction of a smiling tin soldier, indicative of the beverage's name deriving from the 1908 Oscar Straus operetta The Chocolate Soldier, which was based on the Bernard Shaw play Arms and the Man.

The beverage competed with Yoo-hoo, another chocolate soft drink.

It was also bottled in Mérida, Yucatán, Mexico, under the name "Soldado de Chocolate".

== Cocktail ==
The "Chocolate Soldier" cocktail is an alcoholic beverage made with chocolate, ice, and liquor. Different liquor can be used and sometimes milk or soda water is added. One classic recipe recommends cognac, dark chocolate liqueur, dry vermouth and a dash of orange bitters.
