= Orange soft drink =

Type of carbonated drinks

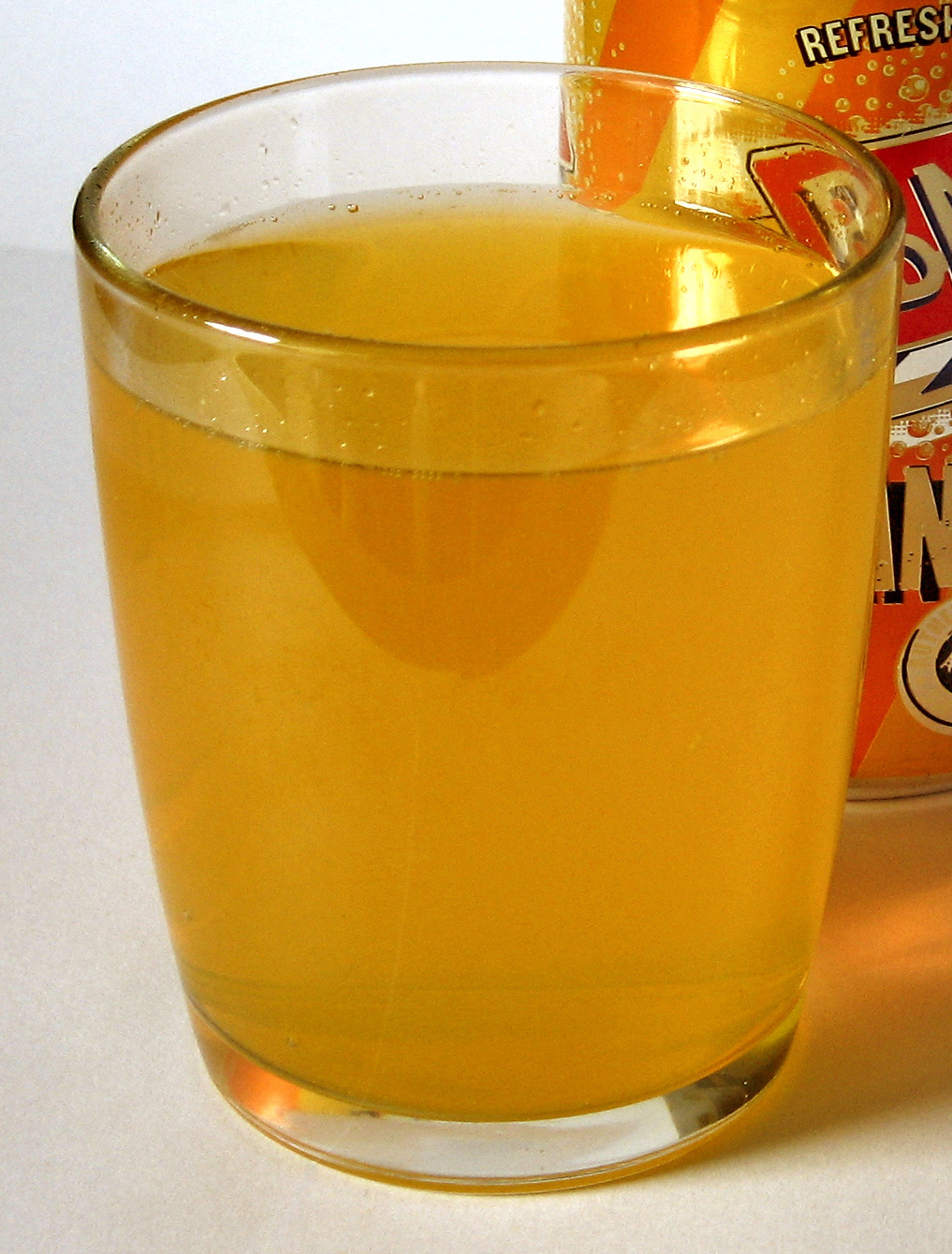
A glass of Barr orangeade

Orange soft drinks (called orange pop or orange soda in certain regions of the United States and Canada, orangeade in the UK and Quebec, or the genericized trademark Orangina in France) are carbonated orange drinks.

Non-carbonated orange drinks, i.e. the orange-juice-flavored equivalent of lemonade, are also made, with brands such as Minute Maid, and blends like cherry orangeade and lemon-orangeade are also made in some places, with recipes being commonly available.

Orange soft drinks (especially those without orange juice) often contain very high levels of sodium benzoate, and this often imparts a slight metallic taste to the beverage. Other additives commonly found in orange soft drinks include glycerol ester of wood rosin, brominated vegetable oil, and sodium hexametaphosphate.

== History ==
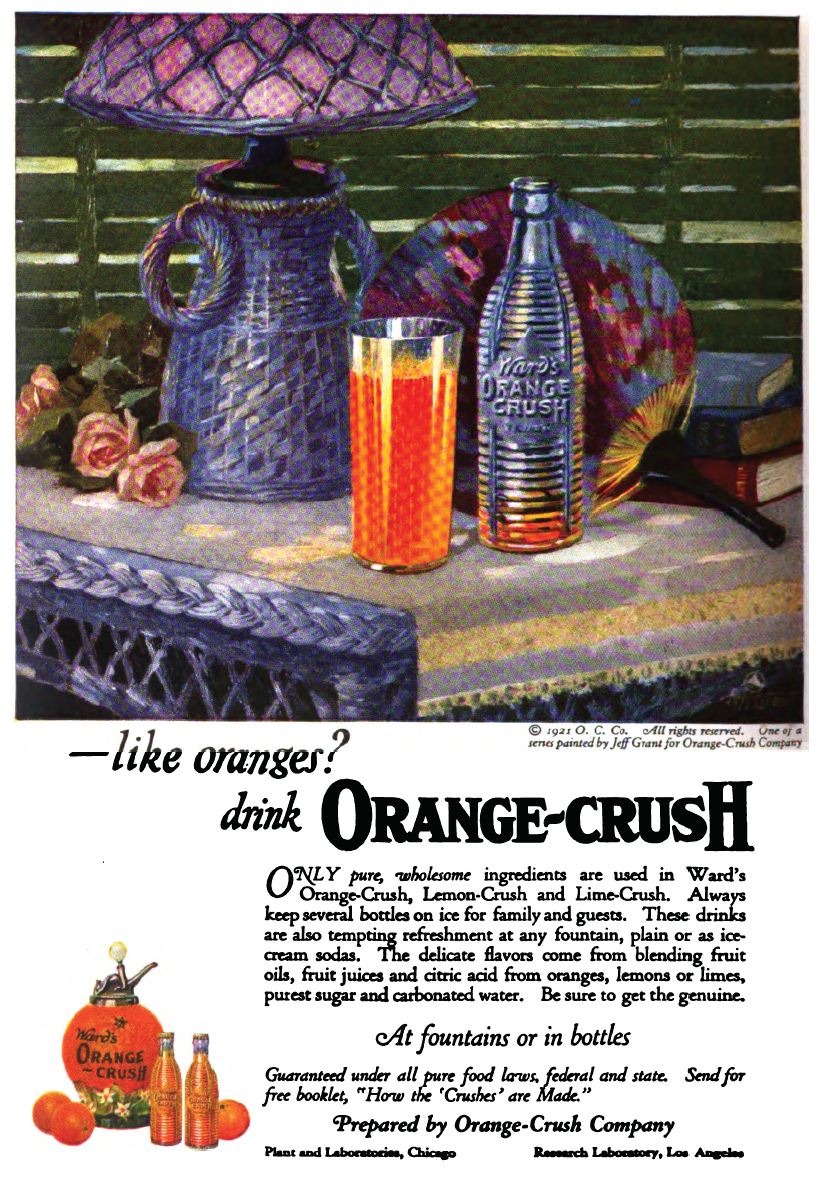
A 1921 advertisement for Orange Crush

Orangeade first appeared as a variety of carbonated drink provided in soda fountains in American drugstores in the late 19th century, brands including Miner's and Lash's. A recipe for homemade orangeade appears in editions of Fannie Farmer's cookbook.

== List of brands ==
- Appelsín, a popular soft drink from Iceland
- Aranciata from San Pellegrino
- AriZona
- Asina Orange Soda from Norway
- Barr Orangeade
- Cactus Cooler (orange-pineapple)
- Cadbury Schweppes
- Celeste soda orange soda
- Cplus orange soda (Canada)
- Crush
- Dr. Brown's orange soda
- Donald Duck orange soda
- Elvan Gazoz Türkiye
- Fanta
- Faygo
- Frost King
- Golf Orange is a local orange soft drink brand from Serbia produced by Knjaz Miloš.
- Gold Spot (India)
- Green Spot (soft drink)
- Hellena Oranżada, Poland
- Jaffa, popular in Sweden and Finland
- Jarritos, Barrilitos and other Mexican soft drink brands make orange- or mandarina-flavored soda.
- Jianlibao (Chinese sport drink popular during 1980s and 1990s)
- Jones Soda
- Kas Naranja (made by PepsiCo in Spain, Mexico, and France)
- Kist orange soda made in Chicago, Illinois
- Lorina
- Minute Maid orange soda (bottled by Coca-Cola)
- Mirinda Orange
- MiWadi
- Mountain Dew LiveWire (made by Pepsi)
- Naranjada (made by Postobón in Colombia)
- Nehi
- Nesbitt's
- Orange Cheerio (Japan)
- Orange Dream (made by Sprecher Brewery)
- Orangette (marketed by Walmart)
- Orangina
- Royal Crown
- Royal Tru-Orange (Philippines)
- Schin Laranja (Orange soda bottled by Schincariol in Brazil)
- Sisi (Netherlands)
- Slice
- Solo (Norway)
- Stewart's Orange'n Cream
- Sukita (Brazil)
- Sumol (Portugal)
- Sunkist
- Tango
- TruAde
- Tuborg Squash (Danish orange flavored soda bottled by Carlsberg)
- Whistle
- Yedigün (made by PepsiCo in Turkey)
- Zingo

== See also ==
- -ade (suffix)
- List of brand name soft drinks products
- List of soft drink flavors
- List of soft drinks by country
- Orange (fruit)
- Orange drink
- Orange juice
- Soft drink
