= Suncrest, West Virginia =

Suncrest
- Unincorporated community
- Location within the state of West Virginia Suncrest (the United States)
- Coordinates: 38°41′17″N 80°15′12″W
- Country: United States
- State: West Virginia
- County: Randolph
- Elevation: 2,300 ft (700 m)
- Time zone: UTC-5 (Eastern (EST))
  - Summer (DST): UTC-4 (EDT)
- GNIS ID: 1555751

Suncrest is an unincorporated community in Randolph County, West Virginia, United States.

The community derives its name from the Sun Lumber Company.
