= Sun Crest =

American soft drink brand

- Type: Soft drink
- Manufacturer: The Dad's Root Beer Company, LLC.
- Introduced: 1938
- Flavor: Orange
- Variants: Sun Crest Strawberry Soda; Sun Crest Grape Soda; Sun Crest Pineapple Soda; Sun Crest Peach; Sun Crest Cherry; Sun Crest Grapefruit; Sun Crest Lemon & Lime
- Website: www.dadsrootbeer.com/dads/dads.nsf/vwContent/Sun_Crest

Sun Crest is a brand of flavored carbonated soft drink manufactured by The Dad's Root Beer Company, LLC, of Jasper, Indiana, and owned by Hedinger Brands, LLC, except for six countries in Asia owned by The Monarch Beverage Company, Inc., of Atlanta, Georgia. Sun Crest Orange is currently available in fountain service and glass bottles in select markets in the U.S.

== History ==
The Sun Crest brand of soft drinks was introduced by the National NuGrape Company of Atlanta, Georgia, in 1938 as a flavor line, and sister brand to NuGrape, 2-Way lemon lime, and Kickapoo Joy Juice. Sun Crest was acquired along with NuGrape in 1968 by The Moxie Company (renamed Moxie-Monarch-NuGrape Company and later Monarch Beverage Company). Hedinger Brands, LLC. purchased the Sun Crest brand from Monarch in 2007 along with Dad's Root Beer, Bubble Up and Dr. Wells brands, and licensed the brand to The Dad's Root Beer Company, LLC. The Dad's Root Beer Company headquarters is located in Jasper, Indiana.

From the 1970s until the early 1990s, Sun Crest-branded lime soda, sarsaparilla, grape soda, and cherry soda were sold in the UK at Happy Shopper stores, and delivered in glass bottles by milkmen from the Co-op. Since 2016, the UK branch of Sun Crest had also begun selling exotic fruit juice, such as pineapple, passion fruit, grapefruit, and coconut water, in supermarkets like Sainsbury's. As of 2021, the only Sun Crest-branded soda still available in the UK was sparkling grape juice.

== Products ==
- Sun Crest Orange Soda
- Sun Crest Strawberry Soda
- Sun Crest Grape Soda
- Sun Crest Pineapple Soda
- Sun Crest Peach
- Sun Crest Cherry
- Sun Crest Grapefruit
- Sun Crest Lemon & Lime
- Sun Crest chocolate drink
