= Pennsylvania Dutch Birch Beer =

American brand of soft drink

Pennsylvania Dutch Birch Beer is a brand of soft drink, of the birch beer type, whose trademark is owned by USA Beverages, Inc., a beverage bottler operating primarily in the United States. It is available in regular and diet varieties and is sold in 12-ounce cans, 20-ounce plastic bottles, and 2-liter bottles. Pennsylvania Dutch Birch Beer's regular variety is sweetened with sugar and/or high-fructose corn syrup. Its diet variety is sweetened with saccharin and/or aspartame, as these have gained popularity.

Some other bottlers offer their own versions of birch beer. In the early 1990s, the Pennsylvania Dutch Birch Beer brand was bottled under the authority of the PDBB Co. by A-Treat Beverages, Inc. (Allentown, PA) and Pepsi Cola Bottling (Williamsport, PA). D & M Management, Inc. (Davidsville, PA), an independent beverage distribution firm, distributed it in West Central Pennsylvania, Maryland, Washington, DC, and Northern Virginia.
