= Zingo =

Swedish soft drink

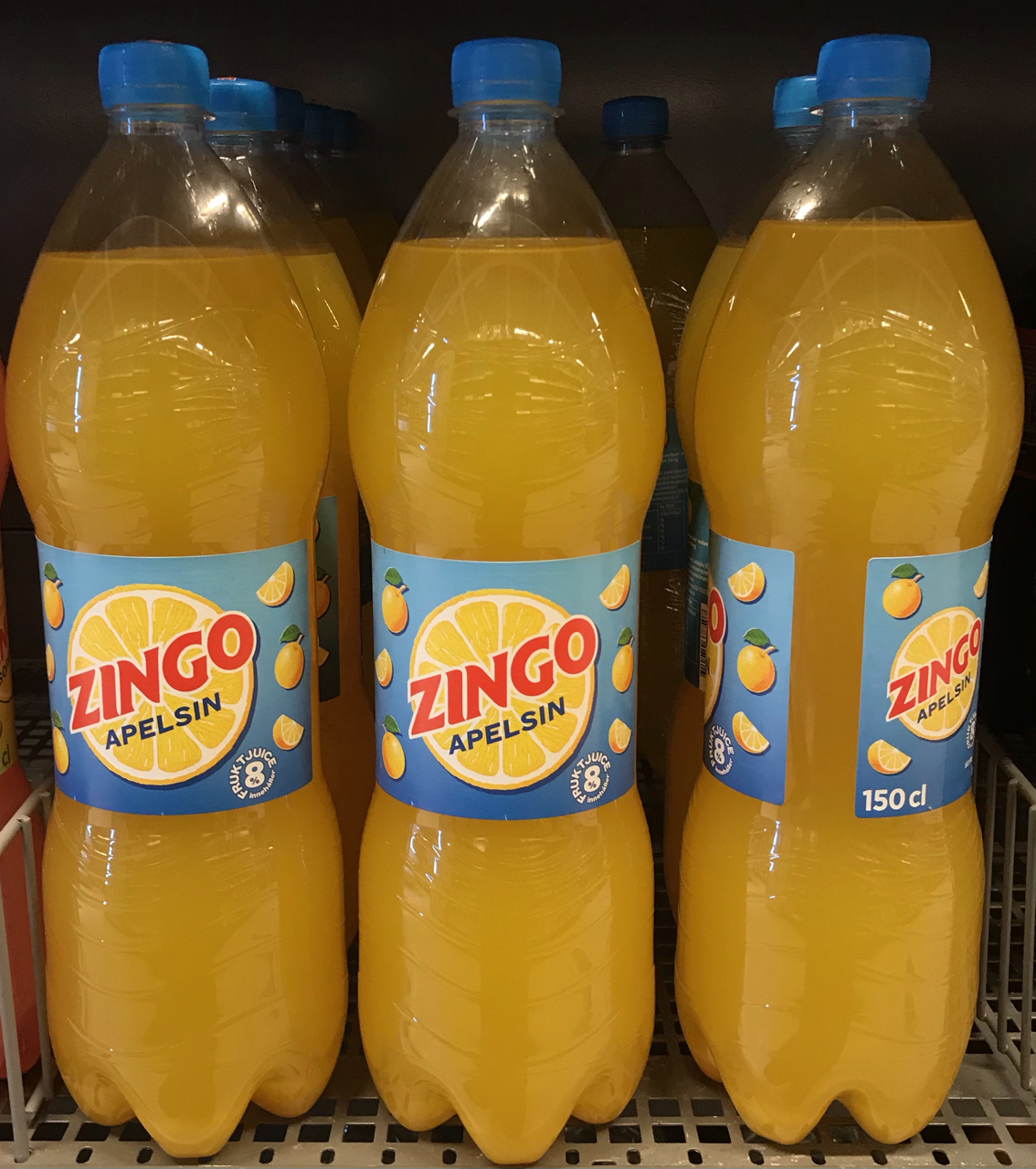
Bottles of Zingo on a store shelf

Zingo is a Swedish soft drink, with a carbonated orange flavor. There is a myth that Zingo was introduced during the 1960s as Ingo-dricka ("Ingo drink"), named after the boxer Ingemar "Ingo" Johansson. After Ingo lost the world championship in heavy weight boxing, the drink was renamed to Zingo in 1962. That is however false, a modern myth. The name Zingo was registered already 1942, reg number 55857. Originally Zingo was produced in Norrköping, Sweden by Pripps. Pripps was bought by Carlsberg in 2000 and they continue to manufacture Zingo.

== Sources ==
- Carlsberg Sweden
- Swedish Wikipedia on Zingo

== See also ==
- Zingo-nostalgi!
