= Monarch Beverage Company =

International beverage company

The Monarch Beverage Company Inc
- Type: Private
- Industry: Beverage
- Founded: 1965
- Founder: Frank Armstrong
- Headquarters: Atlanta, Georgia, United States
- Key people: Jacques Bombal, CEO
- Products: Kickapoo Joy Juice
- Services: Sale of Beverages
- Website: Monarch Beverage Company website

The Monarch Beverage Company Inc is a diversified, international beverage company based in Atlanta, Georgia. The company's CEO is Jacques Bombal. This company was founded in 1965 by Frank Armstrong. Monarch Beverage Company aimed to establish itself by offering lesser-known soft drink brands that had strong regional sales and appeal. Monarch Beverage Company purchased Dad's Root Beer product line from IC Industries of Chicago in 1986. Around that time, it was the second largest volume (12 million cases) root beer brand and was distributed by the Coca-Cola bottler network. In 2007, The Dad's Root Beer Company, LLC of Jasper, Indiana, acquired the Dad's Root Beer brand as well as the rights to Bubble Up, Dr. Wells and Sun Crest in the U.S. and some other countries from The Monarch Beverage Co. of Atlanta.

Monarch Beverages is now concentrated on international markets where it does 90% of its business with brands like Kickapoo Joy Juice, and its outside-U.S. ownership of Bubble Up and Sun Crest.

In 2020, Monarch Beverage Company was acquired by Illinois-based Reyes Beer Division.

== Brands ==
- Acute Fruit
- American Cola
- Bubble Up (International rights only)
- COMOTION
- Kickapoo Joy Juice
- Mason's Root Beer
- Nesbitt's (International rights only)
- NTrinsic
- Planet Cola (and other flavors)
- Rush Energy Drink
- Reaktor Energy
- Sensa
- Sun Crest (International rights only)

== Former brands ==
- All Sport (2001–2007)
- Bubble Up (1978–2007)
- Chocolate Soldier (1966–1988)
- Dad's Root Beer (1986–2007)
- Dr. Wells (1987–2007)
- Frostie Root Beer (1980–2000)
- Grapette (and Orangette) (1977–2000) (was never marketed)
- Kist (1966–1997)
- Moxie (1966–2007)
- Nesbitt's (1975–1999)
- NuGrape (1968–1999)
- Quench
- Sun Crest (1968–2007)
