= Orange drink =

Drink

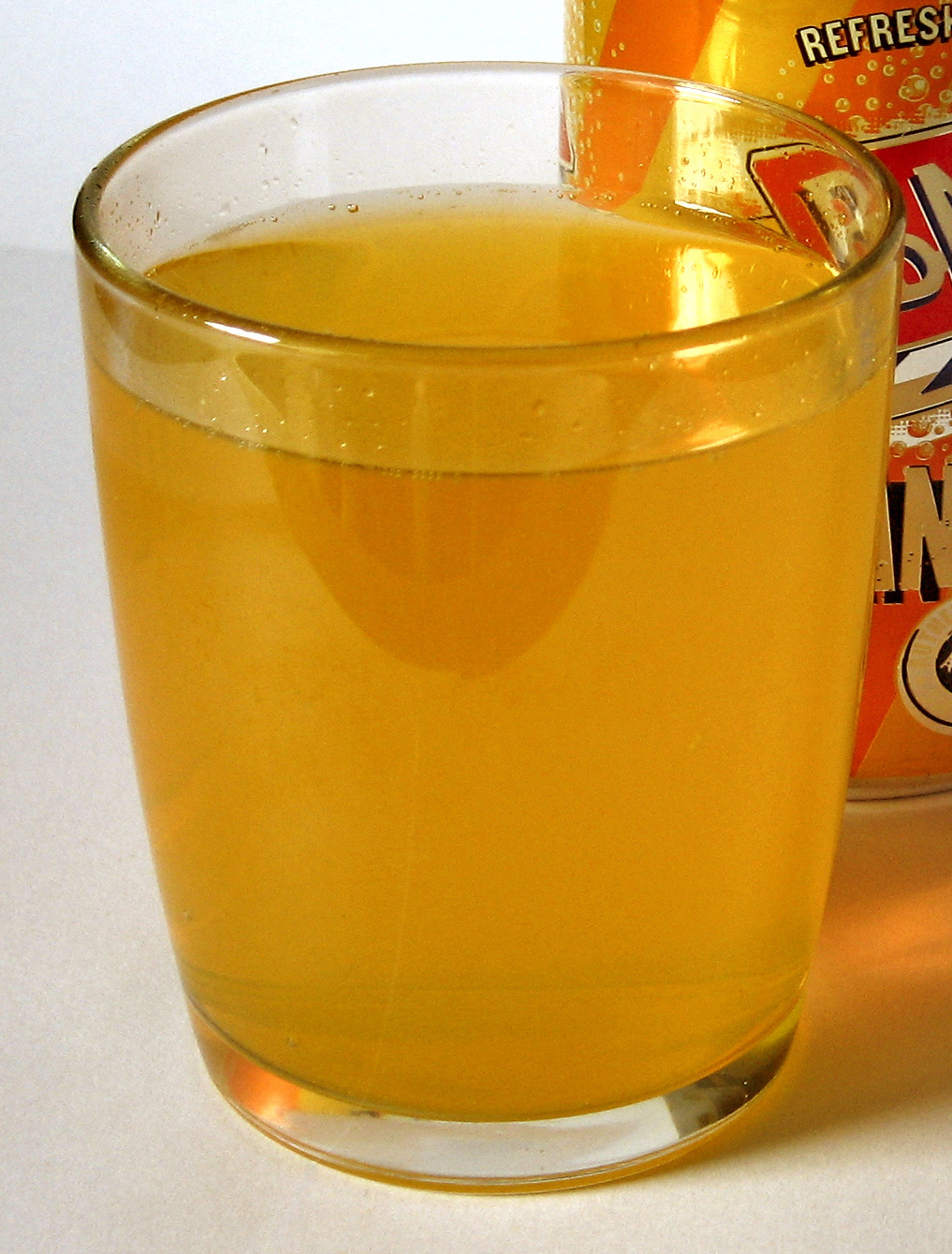
A glass of Barr orangeade

The term orange drink refers to a sweet, sugary, sometimes carbonated, orange-flavored beverage. When carbonated, the drink may be known as orangeade.

Typically such beverages contain little or no orange juice and are mainly composed of water, sugar or sweeteners, flavor, coloring, and additives. Although many orange drinks are fortified with Vitamin C, they are typically very low in nutritional value.

In the United States, as orange drinks can be confused with orange juice, the Food and Drug Administration requires orange drinks, as well as other beverages whose names allude to fruit products, to state the percentage of juice contained above the "Nutrition Facts" label. and requires companies to state them as orange drinks instead of orange juice.

== Varieties ==
- Fanta, a global brand originally centred on carbonated orange drink.
- Orange squash
- Orangeade can refer either to a non-carbonated orange drink, or a carbonated orange soft drink. Non-alcoholic orangeade can be made from orange juice, simple syrup, lemon juice, vanilla extract, salt, and club soda or water. An alcoholic version can be made using, e.g., gin, lemon juice, orange juice, and club soda, or, alternatively, tequila, orange juice, simple syrup, and seltzer; or by taking non-alcoholic orangeade and adding vodka.
- Orangina, carbonated orange drink popular in France, made with 10% concentrated orange, a 2% combination of concentrated lemon, concentrated mandarin and concentrated grapefruit juices as well as 2% orange pulp.
- McDonald's Orange Drink, also often termed "orangeade" on menus until the 1970s, which is Hi-C Orange Lavaburst. It was discontinued in April 2017 and brought back when customers complained.
- Nutri Star (the Venezuelan version of "fortified orange drink.")
- Sunny Delight
- Tang
- Kwenchy Kups, a sugar-free orange flavour drink sold in plastic pots.
- A product named Orange Drink, marketed by the Dairy Maid company on the Bahamian island of New Providence.
- In 2002, a "cheap, fortified, orange-flavored drink" was developed with the intention of improving nutrition in the third world by adding vitamin A, iron, and iodine to people's diets.

== See also ==
- Orange juice
- Orange soft drink
- Squash (drink)
