= NuGrape =

Brand of grape soda

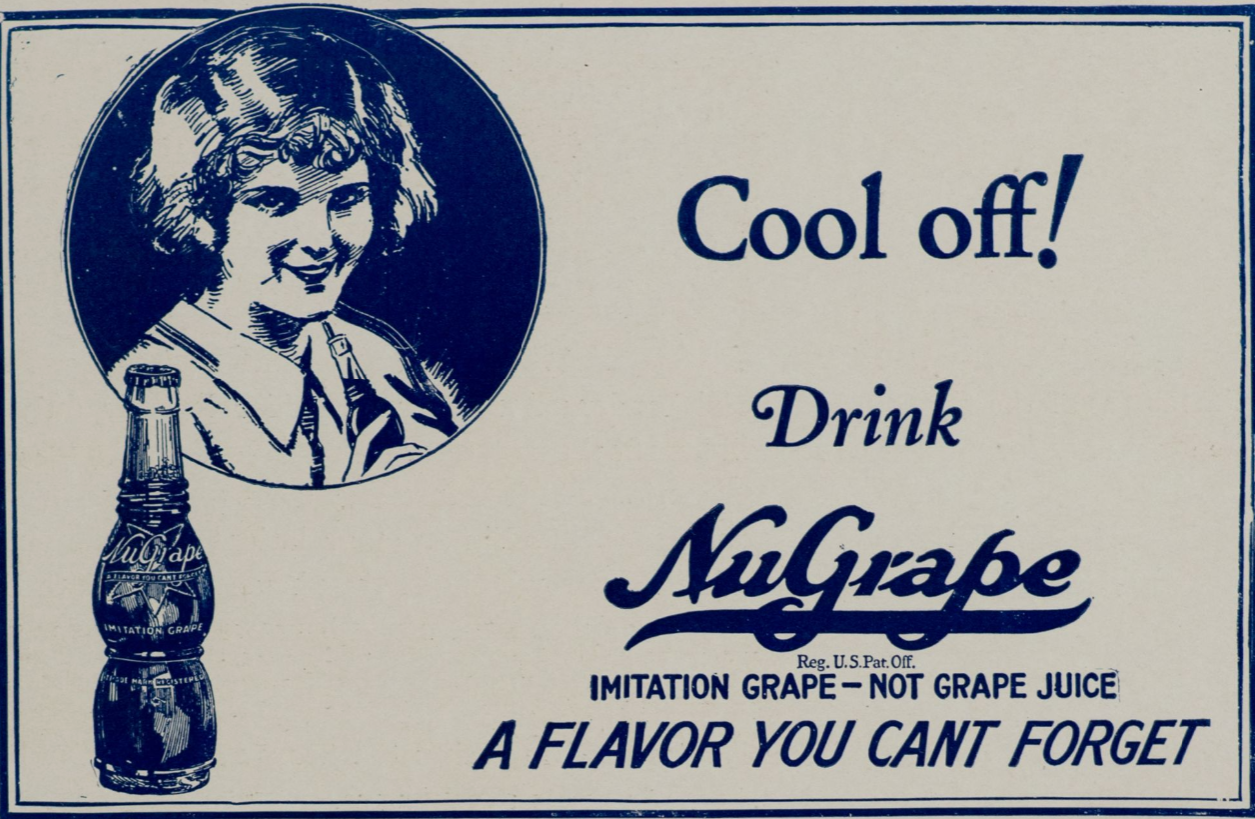
A 1926 advertisement for NuGrape

NuGrape is a brand of grape-flavored soda pop. The NuGrape brand was created in 1906, first bottled in 1921, and by April 1933, The National NuGrape Company was founded in Atlanta, Georgia. In 1922, licensing rights were sold to the Olla Bottling Works in Olla, Louisiana where it was made and distributed for many years. NuGrape was followed up by the popular Sun Crest brand of soft drinks in 1938. In 1965, the National NuGrape Company introduced Kickapoo Joy Juice, a product based on Al Capp's Li'l Abner comic strip. All three brands were acquired in 1968 by The Moxie Company (renamed Moxie-Monarch-NuGrape Company and later Monarch Beverage Company). In 1970, Moxie-Monarch-NuGrape discontinued domestic U.S. sales of Kickapoo Joy Juice.

In 1999, NuGrape and the Nesbitt's line of carbonated drinks were acquired from Monarch Beverage Company in Atlanta by Big Red, Ltd. of Waco, Texas under its North American Beverages Products division, which also included Nesbitt's. The National NuGrape building still exists in Atlanta at 794 Ralph McGill Blvd., but is not open to the public.

Today, NuGrape is usually found in parts of the southeast United States. Specifically, it is sold in parts of Georgia, North Carolina, South Carolina, northwest Alabama, and the eastern half of Tennessee. NuGrape is almost impossible to find for sale west or north of Murfreesboro, Tennessee. However, NuGrape was bottled and distributed in central Kentucky by the Ale-8-One Bottling Company of Winchester, Kentucky, but no longer by Ale-8-One and in the Pacific Northwest by Orca Beverage Company of Mukilteo, Washington.

It is most commonly available in small, novelty candy stores as well as independent grocery stores, available in bottles (glass or plastic) or cans. In recent years, Cracker Barrel restaurants have begun selling NuGrape, by the individual bottle and in six-packs. It is available at World Market stores.
