= Nesbitt's =

American soft drink brand

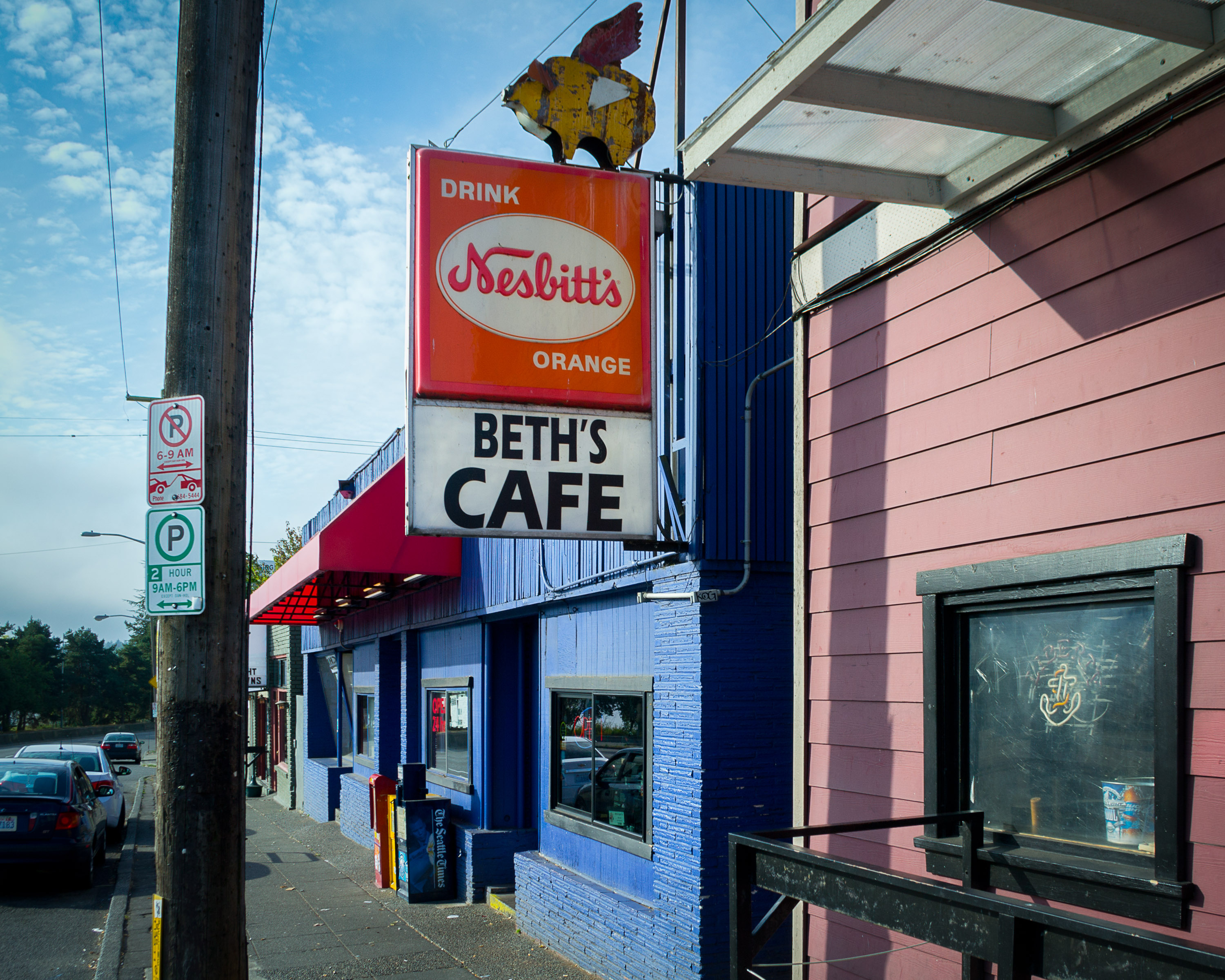
A Nesbitt's Orange sign

Nesbitt's is a brand of orange-flavored soft drink sold in the United States. Nesbitt's was originally produced by the Nesbitt Fruit Products Company of Los Angeles, California. The company also produced several other flavors of soft drink under the Nesbitt's brand and other brand names, including Nesbitt's grape, strawberry and peach-flavored sodas.

== History ==
The Nesbitt's Fruit Products Company was founded in 1924, named after its founder Hugh S. Nesbitt. The Nesbitt's brand debuted in 1927, initially as part of the company's line of soda fountain products. Nesbitt's began bottling Nesbitt's orange and several other flavors in the late 1930s, putting it in direct competition with established market-leader Orange Crush. Nesbitt's became the US market leader of orange soda pop during the late 1940s and 1950s, with advertisements featuring an unknown model, Marilyn Monroe, in 1946, and proclaiming itself to be the "Largest selling bottled orange drink in the world". Nesbitt's own brand of orange beverage was surpassed in popularity by Fanta in the late 1960s and then faded in popularity. In 1972, the company was sold to The Clorox Company, and in April 1975, the bottling operation was sold to Moxie Industries, Inc. (later Monarch Beverage) of Atlanta.

== Resurrection and legacy ==
Nesbitt's continued to be owned by Moxie Industries through the late 1970s and the 1980s while use of the Nesbitt's brand (for non-bottling usage) was passed along to several companies from 1976 through 1998, including ownership by Borden Inc. in the late 1980s. In 1999, Big Red, Limited of Waco, Texas, the parent company that owns rights to the Big Red soft drink brand, bought the Nesbitt's USA trademark from the Monarch Beverage Company under its North American Beverages Products division, which also includes NuGrape. Although Big Red, Ltd. only actively promotes its Nesbitt's California Honey Lemonade drink, the company licenses the Nesbitt's soda brand to several small independent bottling companies throughout the US.

Retro soda producer Orca Beverage manufactures a bottled version of Nesbitt’s Orange made with cane sugar and natural flavoring. In addition to orange, strawberry and peach Nesbitt's sodas are also available.

The group Negativland put out the "Nesbitt's Lime Soda Song" on their 1987 release Escape From Noise; written and sung by Richard Lyons, it was about a man who lost his temper after "a bee flew into" his soda and "we had to throw it away".

Internationally, Monarch Beverages owns and distribute Nesbitt's sodas.

== Variants ==
(available outside U.S. only)

- Nesbitt's Orange
- Nesbitt's Apple
- Nesbitt's Pineapple
- Nesbitt's Sweet Red
- Nesbitt's Grape
- Nesbitt's Black Currant
- Nesbitt's Still Honey Lemonade
- Nesbitt's Still Kiwi Strawberry
- Nesbitt's Splash Lemon Cola
