= Dad's Root Beer =

Brand of root beer

- Type: Soft Drink
- Manufacturer: The Dad's Root Beer Company LLC
- Distributor: Hedinger Brands, LLC.
- Origin: Chicago, Illinois, U.S.
- Introduced: 1937; 89 years ago
- Color: Brown/Copper
- Flavor: Root Beer
- Related products: Hires Root Beer, Mug Root Beer, A&W Root Beer, Barq's, IBC Root Beer
- Website: www.dadsrootbeer.com

The Dad's Root Beer Company, LLC
- Industry: Beverages
- Headquarters: Jasper, Indiana, United States
- Products: Dad's Root Beer, Sun Crest, Dr. Wells, Bubble Up
- Owner: Hedinger Brands, LLC.
- Website: www.DadsRootBeer.com

Dad's Root Beer is an American brand of root beer that was created in Chicago in 1937 by Ely Klapman and Barney Berns. It is currently owned by Hedinger Brands, LLC, and sold and marketed by the Dad's Root Beer Company LLC.

== History ==
Dad's Root Beer was established in the 1930s by partners Barney Berns and Ely Klapman in the basement of Klapman's Chicago-area home. The first trademark registration was filed on September 24, 1938, granted on February 14, 1939, to the Dad's Root Beer Company of Chicago, with the product name in use since February 1937. Jules Klapman, son of co-founder Ely, successfully took the Dad's brand international. The name Dad's Old Fashioned Root Beer was selected in honor of Ely Klapman's father.

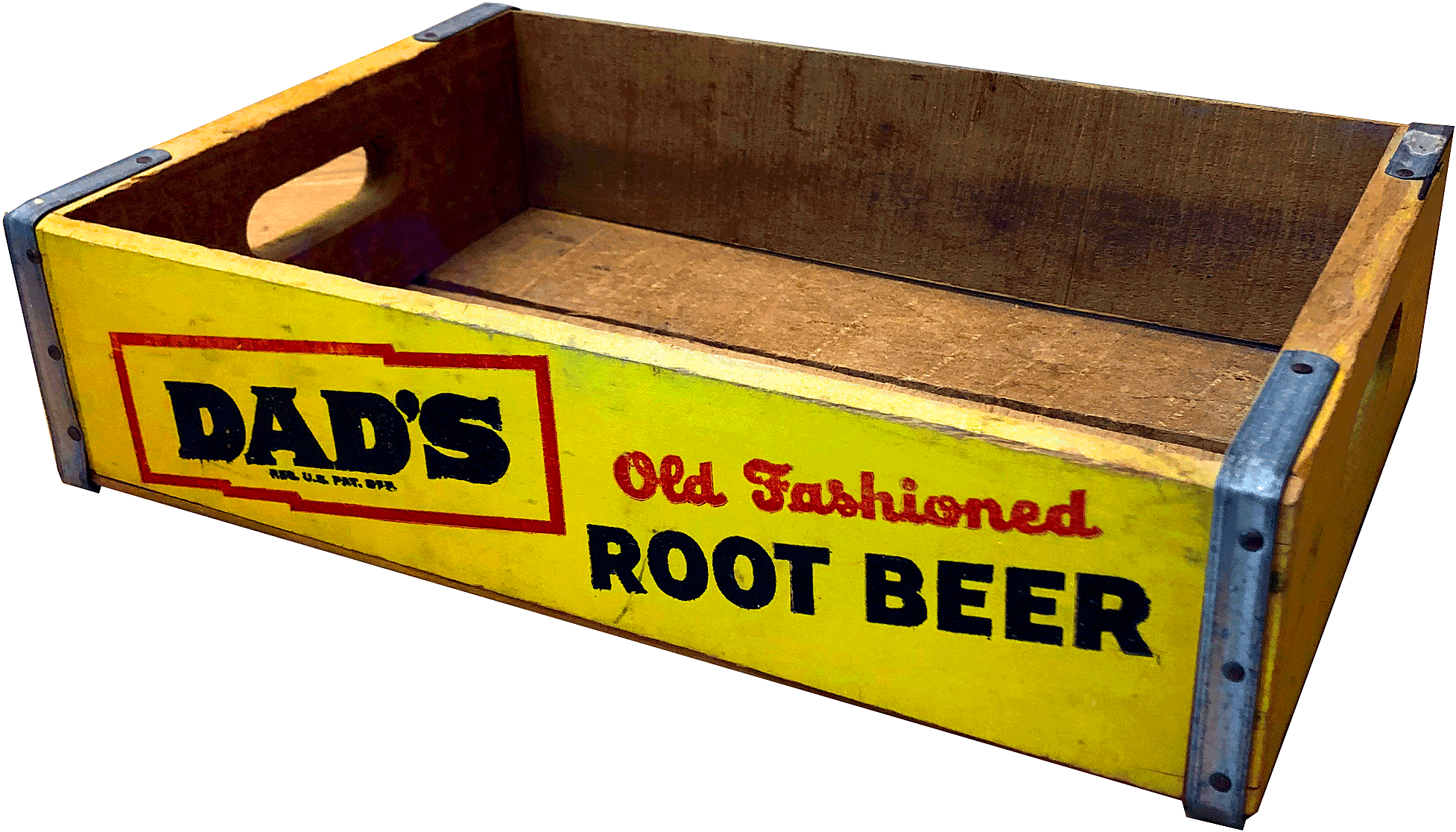
Dad's Root Beer wood bottle crate

Dad's Root Beer was the first product to use the six-pack format invented by the Atlanta Paper Company in the 1940s. Dad's also introduced the half-gallon bottle, becoming the first brand to market this size. Dad's was marketed as a family: the "Junior" size was the smallest, 7, 10 or 12 ounces (355 mL). "Mama" was a quart bottle (950 mL), and "Papa" was a half gallon (1.9 liters). (The image of the young boy featured on the "Junior" size bottle is Barney Berns' son, Gene.) A common promotion in the 1940s was the 1 cent sale - purchase the Papa half gallon at regular price and get the Mama quart for 1 cent.

The Klapman and Berns families sold rights to the Dad's name and logo to IC Industries of Chicago in 1971.

The Monarch Beverage Company of Atlanta acquired Dad's from IC Industries in 1986. At that time Dad's was distributed by the Coca-Cola bottler network, sold 12 million cases annually, and held the second largest share of the root beer category behind A & W.

In 2007 Dad's Root Beer was purchased, along with the Bubble Up, Dr. Wells, and Sun Crest brands, by Hedinger Brands, LLC and licensed to the Dad's Root Beer Company, LLC. The company headquarters is now located in Jasper, Indiana.

In 2025, they released a Dad's Root Beer "Root Beer Float" ice cream.

== Flavors ==
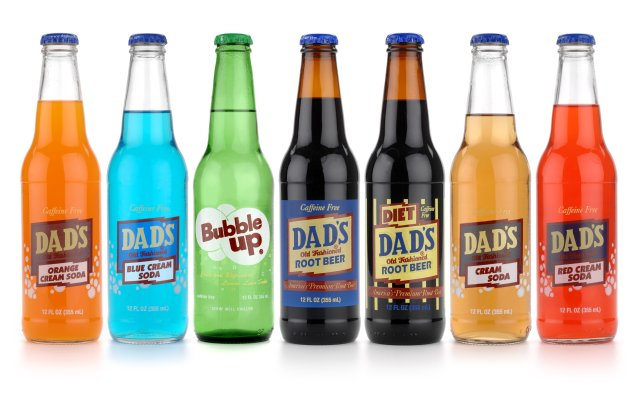
Dad's Root Beer glass bottle products

Dad's makes the following brands/flavors:

- Dad's Old Fashioned Root Beer
- Diet Dad's Old Fashioned Root Beer
- Dad's Old Fashioned Cream Soda
- Dad's Old Fashioned Orange Cream Soda
- Dad's Old Fashioned Red Cream Soda
- Dad's Old Fashioned Blue Cream Soda
- Bubble Up
- Sun Crest Orange
- Dr. Wells

== Advertising ==
The company's signs on the Edens Expressway (I-94) and one near Lake Shore Drive asking "Have you had it lately?" became fixtures on the Chicago landscape.

The product's jingle was a simple line sung several times, to a conga beat, with the "kick" coming on "Beer":

In the mid-1950s, Dad's sponsored on a regional basis the syndicated TV adventure series Sheena, Queen of the Jungle.

== IndyCar sponsorship ==
Dad's Root Beer became an IndyCar Series associate sponsor in 2007. The company continued the relationship until 2011.
