= Bubble Up =

Lemon-lime soft drink brand

- Type: Soft drink
- Manufacturer: The Dad's Root Beer Company LLC (USA, Canada, and Mexico); Monarch Beverage Company (Internationally)
- Origin: Sweet Valley Products Co. Sandusky, Ohio, U.S.
- Introduced: 1919, 107 years ago
- Color: Clear
- Flavour: Lemon-lime
- Variants: Bubble Up Lemon-Lime; Bubble Up Diet Lemon-Lime; Bubble Up Bitter Lemon; Bubble Up Ginger Ale; Bubble Up Tonic Water; Bubble Up Soda Water; Bubble Up Mojito
- Website: www.dadsrootbeer.com/bubble-up

Bubble Up is a lemon-lime soft drink brand created in 1919 by Sweet Valley Products Co. of Sandusky, Ohio. It is now manufactured by the Dad's Root Beer Company, LLC, and owned by Hedinger Brands, LLC, for the United States, Canada, and Mexico, and by Monarch Beverage Company of Atlanta for international markets (in particular Asia and Africa).

== History ==
The Bubble Up name was first used in 1919 by Sweet Valley Products Co. of Sandusky, Ohio. Bubble Up at that time was advertised as a grape juice, rather than lemon-lime. Sweet Valley Products filed a trademark for the name Bubble-Up on August 13, 1919; registration date was April 12, 1921.

The name Bubble-Up was virtually unused from 1922 to 1937. LeRoy O. Schneeburger of St. Louis, Missouri, then President of the Whistle-Vess Beverage Co., bought the United States registration of Bubble-Up in 1937 and registered the mark in his own name in 1938. He introduced Bubble-Up as a lemon-lime drink, and the mark was never used for a grape juice.

The Bubble-Up Company was formed in St. Louis and the beverage was franchised and bottled all across the country. The Bubble-Up Company remained in St. Louis until approximately 1953.

In 1953, the Bubble Up Company was located in Peoria, Illinois. The owner at that time was the O-So Grape Co. On April 10, 1959, the trademark "Kiss of Lemon - Kiss of Lime" was registered by Bubble Corporation.

Sometime in the early to mid-1960s, the Bubble Up Corp. was located in Los Angeles. The company fell onto bad times and filed for bankruptcy in 1970.

I.C. Industries of Chicago, Illinois, bought Bubble Up in 1973 to go along with its recently acquired Dad's Root Beer Co. and Pepsi-Cola General Bottlers. I.C. Industries wanted to revive Bubble Up, and trademarked a new logo for Bubble Up in 1979.

In 1987, Bubble Up was sold along with Dad's Root Beer Co. to the Monarch Co. of Atlanta, Georgia. Bubble Up and Dad's Root Beer remained headquartered in Chicago to serve the company's 240 franchised bottlers.

Hedinger Brands LLC, located in Jasper, Indiana, purchased Bubble Up in 2007.

== Advertising ==
Famous for the advertising slogan – "kiss of lemon, kiss of lime." In the 1960s, Bubble Up radio advertising used the catchy jingle (to a melody), "Sugar-free Bubble Up has a pizzazz, that is what Sugar-free Bubble Up has."

== In popular culture ==
- Jerry Lewis gets six bottles of Bubble Up when taking care of a gas station in the 1965 movie The Family Jewels.
- In the 1977 film Oh, God! starring John Denver, a six-pack of Bubble Up is on the refrigerator, next to a six-pack of Coca-Cola.
- Young actor David Caruso was featured in a 1980 Bubble Up television commercial.
- Country singer Merle Haggard referenced Bubble Up in his 1981 hit song "Rainbow Stew".
- Hank Williams Jr. referenced Merle Haggard, "Rainbow Stew" and Bubble Up in his 1982 song "The South's Gonna Rattle Again".
- Compton's Diner, seen in the opening of the 1967 movie In the Heat of the Night, is adorned with a Bubble Up advertising sign.
- In a 1986 SNL sketch "Get A Life!" one of the convention runners mentions Bubble Up as one of the beverages that the fans could enjoy.
- Singer and actress Ariana Grande featured Bubble Up in the video for her cover of "Die in Your Arms".
- Adrianne Harun's 2014 novel A Man Came Out of a Door in the Mountain has several characters who drink Diet Bubble Up, but no one actually buys it.

== Variants ==
(for International markets only)

- Bubble Up Lemon-Lime
- Bubble Up Diet Lemon-Lime
- Bubble Up Bitter Lemon
- Bubble Up Ginger Ale
- Bubble Up Tonic Water
- Bubble Up Soda Water
- Bubble Up Mojito
