= Kickapoo Joy Juice =

American soft drink

- Type: Soft drink
- Distributor: Monarch Beverage Company
- Origin: United States
- Introduced: 1965
- Color: Green
- Flavor: Citrus
- Variants: Kickapoo Fruit Shine; Kickapoo Fuzzy Navel; Kickapoo Malibu
- Related products: Mountain Dew
- Website: DrinkKickapoo.com

Kickapoo Joy Juice is a citrus-flavored soft drink brand owned by the Monarch Beverage Company. The name was introduced in Li'l Abner, a comic strip that ran from 1934 through 1977. Although Li'l Abner's Kickapoo Joy Juice was an alcoholic drink, the real-life beverage is a lightly carbonated soft drink.

== Li'l Abner ==
"Kickapoo Joy Juice" was a fictional beverage coined in the American comic strip Li'l Abner. Al Capp, the cartoonist, described the beverage as "a liquor of such stupefying potency that the hardiest citizens of Dogpatch, after the first burning sip, rose into the air, stiff as frozen codfish". It was said to be an elixir of such power that the fumes alone have been known to melt the rivets off battleships.

Capp asserted in 1965 that the cartoon "never has suggested that the drink is moonshine", in response to claims that the Kickapoo Joy Juice of Li'l Abner was an illicitly distilled liquor. Brewed by Hairless Joe and Lonesome Polecat, two of the comic strip's backwoods poachers, the ingredients of the brew are both mysterious and all-encompassing, (much like the contents of their cave, which has been known to harbor prehistoric monsters.) When a batch "needs more body", the formidable pair simply goes out and clubs "a body" (often a moose), and tosses it in. Over the years, the "recipe" has called for live grizzly bears, panthers, kerosene, horseshoes and anvils, among other ingredients.

== Product ==
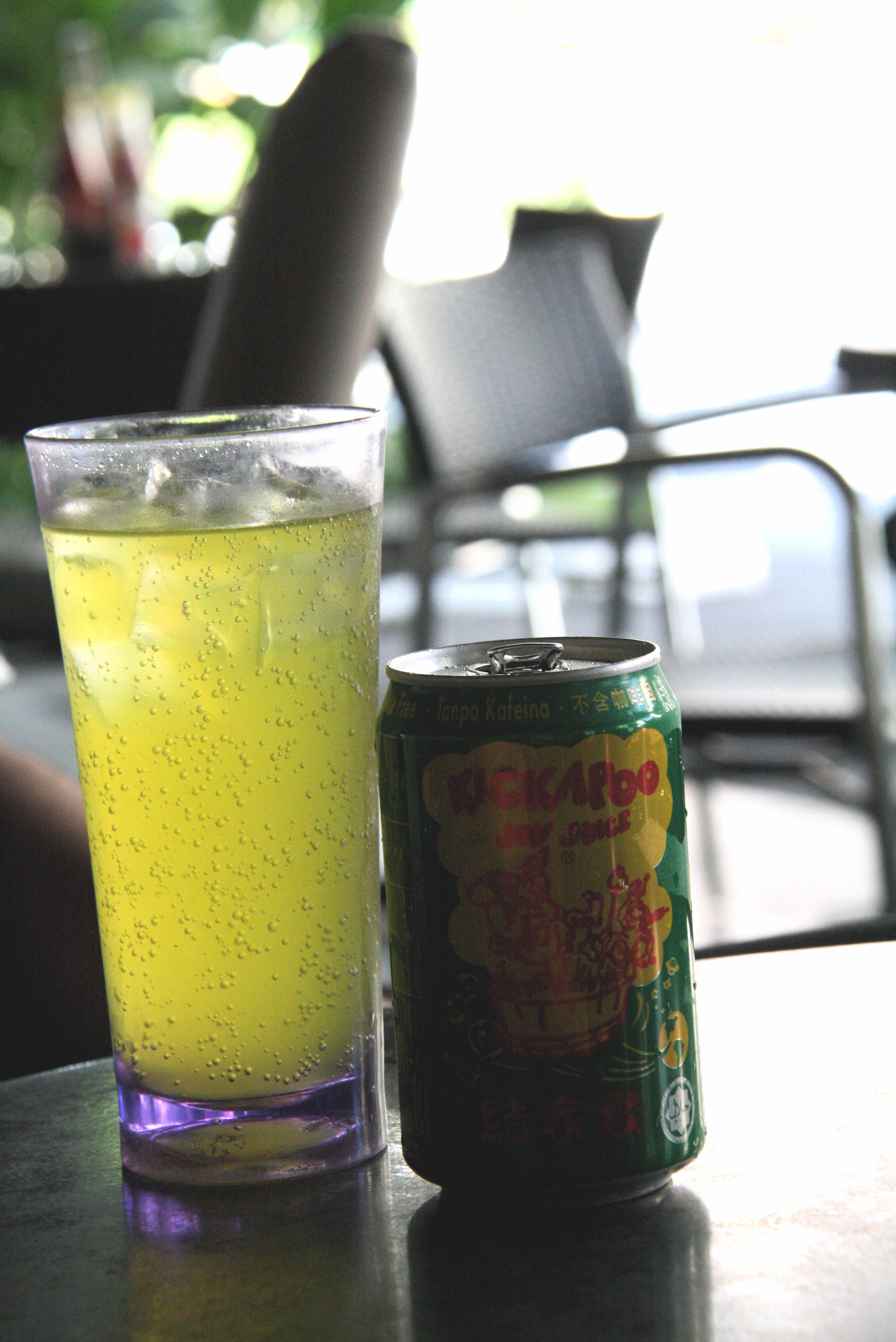
A glass and can of Kickapoo Joy Juice

The real-life drink was introduced in 1965 under NuGrape, a former brand of the Monarch Beverage Company. That year, Nugrape worked out a deal with Al Capp, the owner of the rights to the name "Kickapoo Joy Juice", to produce the beverage as a carbonated soft drink. Capp, however, would have the last word on all advertising and promotion. Kickapoo Joy Juice's early advertising campaign was very similar to the Mountain Dew soft drink of that time – using characters from Li'l Abner to create and market a hillbilly feeling. Although the product is distributed largely in Asian markets (Singapore, Malaysia, Brunei, Cambodia and Bangladesh), the can still comes decorated with a vintage Li'l Abner drawing.

The Wall Street Journal had a regular feature on mixed drinks, and once published in it a recipe for Kickapoo Joy Juice. The backstory is that it had been illicit hooch ginned up by soldiers during World War II, often starting from alcohol intended for fuel for torpedoes and the like.

== Variants ==
- Kickapoo Joy Juice (original)
- Kickapoo Fruit Shine (sangria flavored)
- Kickapoo Fuzzy Navel (peach flavored)
- Kickapoo Malibu (piña colada flavored)
- Kickapoo Lemonade (lemon flavored)

== See also ==
- Kickapoo people
- List of soft drinks by country
- The song of the same name by The Rivingtons
