= Deaths in July 1982 =

The following is a list of notable deaths in July 1982.

Entries for each day are listed alphabetically by surname. A typical entry lists information in the following sequence:

- Name, age, country of citizenship at birth, subsequent country of citizenship (if applicable), reason for notability, cause of death (if known), and reference.

== July 1982 ==
=== 2 ===
- DeFord Bailey, 82, American old-time musician and songwriter, he is considered to be the first African American country music star, he was one of the first performers to be introduced on the Nashville-based radio station WSM's Grand Ole Opry,kidney failure and heart failure
- John Watts, 52, American composer and conceptual artist

=== 4 ===
- Antonio Guzmán Fernández, 71, 46th president of the Dominican Republic
- Terry Higgins, 37, Welsh disc jockey and barman, he also served as a Hansard reporter in the House of Commons, death due to parasitic pneumonia, he was one of the first AIDS patients to die in the United Kingdom. He is the eponym of the Terry Higgins Trust which was established by his friends, and which is dedicated to preventing the spread of HIV

=== 5 ===
- Geoffrey Keynes, 95, British surgeon and author

=== 6 ===
- Bob Johnson, 76, American professional baseball player, he played as a left fielder in Major League Baseball for three American League teams from 1933 to 1945, though he is primarily associated with the Philadelphia Athletics,heart failure
- Alma Reville, 82, English screenwriter and film editor, she started her film career in the 1910s as a teenaged cutter for the Twickenham Film Studios
- Raúl Roa García, 75, politician and diplomat who served as Foreign Minister of Cuba
- Abrim Tilmon, member of The Detroit Emeralds
- Warren Tufts, 56, American writer and artist for comic books and comic strips, primarily known for creating the Western adventure strip Casey Ruggles and being a regular artist for Gold Key Comics, killed in an aviation accident, while piloting an airplane of his own design

=== 8 ===
- Sylvan Byck, 77, American cartoonist and editor, he served as the comics editor and eventual vice president of the King Features Syndicate from 1945 until his retirement in 1978, he is credited with launching or revising a number of popular comic strips, such as Beetle Bailey and Hi and Lois,
- Gunnar Eriksson, 60, Swedish cross-country skier, he won two medals at the 1948 Winter Olympics, death due to ALS (variously known as amyotrophic lateral sclerosis, motor neuron disease, and Lou Gehrig's disease)
- Virginia Hall, 76, American wartime spy, operative of the British Special Operations Executive (SOE) in Vichy France and in Madrid, she subsequently joined the American Office of Strategic Services (OSS), primarily used in a mission to arm and train the French Maquis in preparation for the Allied invasion of Normandy, she also served as one of the first female agents of the Central Intelligence Agency (CIA) in the aftermath of World War II, serving from 1947 until her mandatory retirement in 1966
- Isa Miranda, 77, Italian actress, she played femme fatale roles while under contract with the film studio Paramount Pictures

=== 9 ===
- Daphne Dale, 49, Kenyan-born British ballet dancer, ballet teacher, and horse trainer, one of the victims killed in the aviation accident of Pan Am Flight 759

=== 10 ===
- Maria Jeritza, 94, Austrian soprano

=== 11 ===
- Susan Littler, 34, English actress, ovarian cancer

=== 12 ===
- Kenneth More, 67, English actor, multiple system atrophy (MSA)

=== 13 ===
- John Alexander, 84, American actor, he portrayed Teddy Brewster in the black comedy film Arsenic and Old Lace (1944), a lunatic character who thinks that he is Theodore Roosevelt, he also portrayed an actual version of Roosevelt in the Western comedy Fancy Pants (1950)

=== 14 ===
- Jackie Jensen, 55, American baseball player, 1958 American League Most Valuable Player Award winner, heart attack

=== 15 ===
- Enid Lorimer, 94, English-born Australian actress, writer of children's literature, and theosophist

=== 16 ===
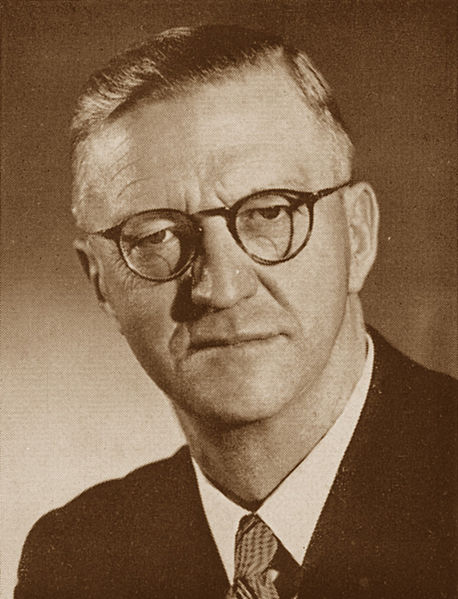
C. R. Swart

- Patrick Dewaere, 35, French actor, suicide by firearm
- C. R. Swart, 87, South African politician, he served as the last Governor-General of South Africa from 1959 until 1961, he served as the first State President of South Africa from 1961 until 1967

=== 18 ===
- Roman Jakobson, 85, Russian linguist and literary theorist, he was a pioneer of structural linguistics and he is regarded as the founder of the modern discipline of phonology
- Quirico Pignalberi, 91, Italian Roman Catholic priest and member of the Conventual Franciscans,combat medic during World War I, popular confessor and traveling preacher during the interwar period, award-winning artisan and repairman, specialist in the repair of clocks

=== 19 ===
- Hugh Everett III, 51, American physicist, he is primarily known for proposing the relative state interpretation of quantum mechanics, which later became the basis of the many-worlds interpretation (MWI), he also worked on various studies of the Minuteman missile project, and he published an influential study on the effects of fallout in nuclear weapon campaigns,heart attack
- John Harvey, 70, English actor, he played Inspector Loomis in the film noir Stage Fright (1950)

=== 20 ===
- Jean Girault, 58, French film director and screenwriter, primarily known for comedy films, tuberculosis

=== 21 ===
- Baynes Barron, 65, American actor, infantry sergeant during World War II
- Dave Garroway, 69, American television host and pioneer of the talk show genre in television, he was the founding host and anchor of NBC's Today from 1952 until 1961,suicide by shotgun. Garroway had spent some weeks in and out of hospitals prior to his death, suffering long-term complications from a staph infection

=== 22 ===
- Garry Meadows, 43, Australian television presenter, radio announcer, and actor, considered one of the first announcers to use the talkback format, host of the game show The Price Is Right.heart attack at his workplace

=== 23 ===
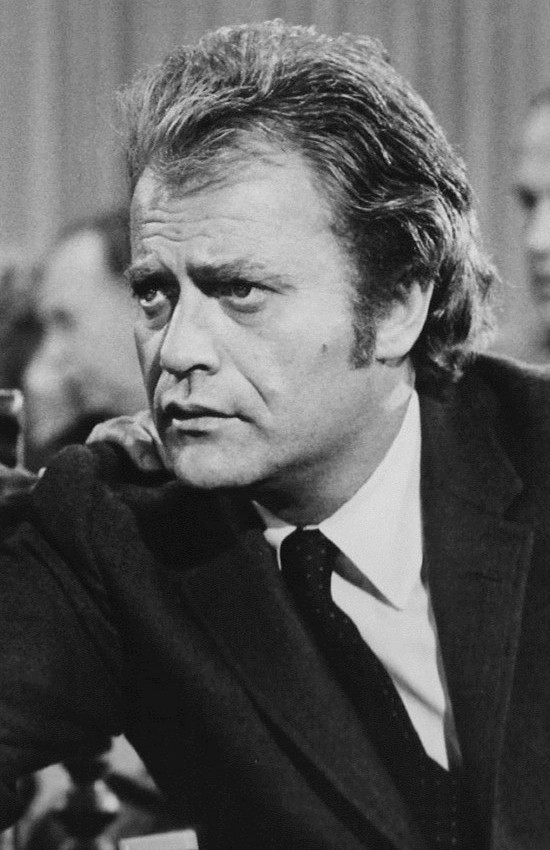
Vic Morrow

- Vic Morrow, 53, American actor, he portrayed a thug student in his film debut Blackboard Jungle (1955), and he was subsequently typecast in portraying tough guys and juvenile delinquents due to his "menacing" appearance, one of the victims of the Twilight Zone accident, a falling helicopter landed on top of him, killing him instantly. Morrow was also decapitated and mutilated by the helicopter's rotor blades
- Betty Parsons, 82, American artist, art dealer, and art collector, primarily known for her early promotion and support for Abstract Expressionism; during the late 1940s, Parsons' privately-owned art gallery in Manhattan was the only one willing to market the works of certain avant-garde American artists

=== 25 ===
- Hal Foster, 89, Canadian-American comic strip artist and writer, creator of the fantasy adventure strip Prince Valiant,he also handled the Sunday strip of Tarzan from 1931 until 1937, Foster is credited with introducing a number of new techniques for newspaper comics, including the use of chiaroscuro and naturalistic drawings

=== 28 ===
- Keith Green, 28, Contemporary Christian music singer-songwriter and instrumentalist
- George Kleinsinger, 68, American composer, primarily known for children's compositions and music scores for Broadway theatre, film, and television, co-creator of the popular song Tubby the Tuba(1945), and the musical Shinbone Alley (1957), he worked on the music for both the 1948 animated adaptation of Rudolph the Red-Nosed Reindeer and the adaptation of the same story in a 1964 television special by Rankin-Bass,cancer
- Nick Lucas, 84, American jazz singer and guitarist, complications of double pneumonia.
- Stanley Kimmel, 88, American writer, historian, playwright, poet, and journalist

=== 29 ===
- Eliseu Maria Coroli, 82, catholic Italo-Brazilian bishop
- Harold Sakata, 62, American Olympic weightlifter, professional wrestler, and actor, he won a silver medal at the light-heavyweight weight class of the weightlifting event at the 1948 Summer Olympics, he portrayed the character Oddjob in the spy film Goldfinger, and the character's sharpened, steel-brimmed bowler hat became a famous and much-parodied trademark of the James Bond film series,liver cancer`
- Vladimir Smirnov, 28, Soviet foil and épée fencer, at the 1980 Summer Olympics, Smirnov had won the gold medal in individual men's foil, a silver medal in foil team and a bronze medal in épée team, died after spending 9 days in a coma, with no brain reflexes. During the 1982 World Fencing Championships in Rome, Smirnov's West German opponent accidentally stabbed him with a jagged broken blade. The blade penetrated through the mesh of Smirnov's fencing mask, through his left eye orbit, and into the frontal lobe of his brain.
- Vladimir K. Zworykin, 92-94,Russian-American inventor, engineer, and pioneer of television technology, his works included charge storage-type tubes, infrared image tubes and the electron microscope

=== 30 ===
Geneviève Guitel, 87, French mathematician and historian of mathematics. She introduced the terms échelle longue and échelle courte (long scale and short scale) to refer to two of the main numbering systems used around the world.
