= Prince Valiant (Fantagraphics) =

Book series by Hal Foster

Publication information
- Publisher: Fantagraphics Books
- Format: Hardcover
- Genre: Adventure; Historical fiction Action
- Publication date: August 2009
- Main character: Prince Valiant

Creative team
- Created by: Hal Foster
- Written by: Hal Foster
- Artist: Hal Foster

Prince Valiant is a series of hardcover books, published by Fantagraphics Books, that collects the Prince Valiant comic strip, written and drawn by Hal Foster. The release of the series began in August 2009.

== Background ==
Prince Valiant, written and drawn by Hal Foster, was a Sunday newspaper comic strip published weekly in full color from February 13, 1937, to the early 1970s when the strip saw a change of writer and artist. The strip itself has continued to the present day and has since its start belonged to the comic syndicate King Features.

== Format ==
The series are collected in hardcover volumes with matte paper stock and sewn binding. A single volume includes two years of Sunday strip pages as well as some supplementary content, such as interviews and introductions. In total this amounts to about 120 pages per book.

=== Reproduction ===
All comic strip content in this series is reproduced from Foster's original engraver's proofs, in full original; and the original coloring has been restored in a reproduction for the first time. Previous collections of Prince Valiant have never had such good material as a base for reproduction. These proofs were ones preserved by Foster himself and, after his passing, donated to Syracuse University, which provided Fantagraphics with scans of these proofs for this collection. Recent advancements in digital color technology now permit a better and more faithful reproduction compared to previous Prince Valiant collections, e.g. the Nostalgia Press' collection from the 1960s and Fantagraphics Books previous trade paperback collection published between 1984 and 2004. These earlier collections did recolor the comic strip but not accordingly to the appearance it had in newspapers when first published. The line work of these older collections also appear subpar to that in this latest Fantagraphics' Prince Valiant collection.

=== Sizing ===
While the volumes of this book collection measure 10.25 by 14 inches (260 mm × 356 mm), the original newspaper publication of the comic strip were usually printed on a full broadsheet page, where it appeared measuring 15 by 22.75 inches (381 mm × 578 mm). The largest reproduction of Prince Valiant, yet, is in the Artist's Edition book: Fantagraphics Studio Edition: Hal Foster's Prince Valiant, ISBN 978-1-60699-897-7, also published by Fantagraphics Books, measuring 17 by 23.25 inches (432 mm × 591 mm). Hal Foster originally drew a whole Prince Valiant Sunday page on paper stock measuring 26 by 35 inches (660 mm × 890 mm), which makes this collection series' area size equal to about 16 percent of the original art size.

=== Extras ===
The supplementary material features interviews with comic historians and with Hal Foster himself, original artwork, essays, biographical sketches by Hal Foster, as well as galleries of dropped panels (those deemed too risqué or violent). In the fourth volume, spanning the years 1943 to 1944, the comic strip tale The Medieval Castle, a separate strip Foster drew, is included. This strip was a tale he drew when he split up the page he was allowed for the Prince Valiant strip during the Second World War, due to a paper shortage and newspaper space being at a premium, splitting his full one-page spread between three-quarters of a page for Prince Valiant and one-quarter for The Medieval Castle, in order to make it easy for editors to remove the non-Prince Valiant strip to free-up space for something of greater importance in wartime. The plot of The Medieval Castle revolves around the childhood and life of two young princes in a medieval castle.

== Recognition ==
- 2010 – Volume one of the series was nominated for the Eisner Award in the category, "Best Archival Collection/Project—Strips".
- 2012 – Volume three and four of the series were nominated for the Eisner Award in the category "Best Archival Collection/Project—Strips".
- 2014 – The series was once again nominated for the Eisner Award, this time volume six and seven were the nominees, also this time in the category "Best Archival Collection/Project—Strips", as well as for "Best Coloring".

== Volumes and box sets ==
The volumes are sold separately as well as in box sets. The suggested retail price of a volume was $29.99, at the beginning of the publication; but the price was later raised to $34.99 per volume. The suggested retail price for a box set is $99.99.

Volumes
| Volume | Release date | Title | Author | ISBN |
|---|---|---|---|---|
| 1 | 2009-08-18 | Prince Valiant Vol. 1: 1937–1938 | Hal Foster | 978-1-60699-141-1 |
| 2 | 2010-07-20 | Prince Valiant Vol. 2: 1939–1940 | Hal Foster | 978-1-60699-348-4 |
| 3 | 2011-03-21 | Prince Valiant Vol. 3: 1941–1942 | Hal Foster | 978-1-60699-407-8 |
| 4 | 2011-10-03 | Prince Valiant Vol. 4: 1943–1944 | Hal Foster | 978-1-60699-455-9 |
| 5 | 2012-07-02 | Prince Valiant Vol. 5: 1945–1946 | Hal Foster | 978-1-60699-484-9 |
| 6 | 2013-02-13 | Prince Valiant Vol. 6: 1947–1948 | Hal Foster | 978-1-60699-588-4 |
| 7 | 2013-09-07 | Prince Valiant Vol. 7: 1949–1950 | Hal Foster | 978-1-60699-645-4 |
| 8 | 2014-02-15 | Prince Valiant Vol. 8: 1951–1952 | Hal Foster | 978-1-60699-699-7 |
| 9 | 2014-07-19 | Prince Valiant Vol. 9: 1953–1954 | Hal Foster | 978-1-60699-735-2 |
| 10 | 2014-12-09 | Prince Valiant Vol. 10: 1955–1956 | Hal Foster | 978-1-60699-800-7 |
| 11 | 2015-07-04 | Prince Valiant Vol. 11: 1957–1958 | Hal Foster | 978-1-60699-828-1 |
| 12 | 2015-11-23 | Prince Valiant Vol. 12: 1959–1960 | Hal Foster | 978-1-60699-876-2 |
| 13 | 2016-06-21 | Prince Valiant Vol. 13: 1961–1962 | Hal Foster | 978-1-60699-925-7 |
| 14 | 2016-11-15 | Prince Valiant Vol. 14: 1963–1964 | Hal Foster | 978-1-60699-970-7 |
| 15 | 2017-07-11 | Prince Valiant Vol. 15: 1965–1966 | Hal Foster | 978-1-68396-025-6 |
| 16 | 2018-01-09 | Prince Valiant Vol. 16: 1967–1968 | Hal Foster | 978-1-68396-064-5 |
| 17 | 2018-06-12 | Prince Valiant Vol. 17: 1969–1970 | Hal Foster | 978-1-68396-104-8 |
| 18 | 2018-11-20 | Prince Valiant Vol. 18: 1971–1972 | Hal Foster | 978-1-68396-144-4 |
| 19 | 2019-06-27 | Prince Valiant Vol. 19: 1973–1974 | John Cullen Murphy | 978-1-68396-202-1 |
| 20 | 2019-11-19 | Prince Valiant Vol. 20: 1975–1976 | John Cullen Murphy + Hal Foster | 978-1-68396-247-2 |
| 21 | 2020-05-05 | Prince Valiant Vol. 21: 1977–1978 | John Cullen Murphy + Hal Foster | 978-1-68396-328-8 |
| 22 | 2020-10-06 | Prince Valiant Vol. 22: 1979–1980 | John Cullen Murphy + Hal Foster | 978-1-68396-378-3 |
| 23 | 2021-05-18 | Prince Valiant Vol. 23: 1981–1982 | John Cullen Murphy + Cullen Murphy + Hal Foster | 978-1-68396-427-8 |
| 24 | 2021-12-07 | Prince Valiant Vol. 24: 1983–1984 | John Cullen Murphy + Cullen Murphy + Hal Foster | 978-1-68396-489-6 |
| 25 | 2022-06-28 | Prince Valiant Vol. 25: 1985-1986 | John Cullen Murphy + Cullen Murphy + Hal Foster | 978-1-68396-574-9 |
| 26 | 2023-01-31 | Prince Valiant Vol. 26: 1987-1988 | John Cullen Murphy + Cullen Murphy + Hal Foster | 978-1-68396-673-9 |
| 27 | 2023-12-05 | Prince Valiant Vol. 27: 1989-1990 | John Cullen Murphy + Cullen Murphy + Hal Foster | 978-1-68396-886-3 |
| 28 | 2024-04-02 | Prince Valiant Vol. 28: 1991-1992 | John Cullen Murphy + Cullen Murphy + Hal Foster | 978-1-68396-929-7 |
| 29 | 2024-12-10 | Prince Valiant Vol. 29: 1993-1994 | John Cullen Murphy + Cullen Murphy + Hal Foster | 979-8875000027 |
| 30 | 2025-08-05 | Prince Valiant Vol. 30: 1995-1996 | John Cullen Murphy + Cullen Murphy + Hal Foster | 979-8875001055 |
| 31 | 2026-06-02 | Prince Valiant Vol. 31: 1997-1998 | John Cullen Murphy + Cullen Murphy + Hal Foster | 979-8875002328 |

=== Box sets ===
Box sets
| Volume | Release date | Title | Period | ISBN |
|---|---|---|---|---|
| 1 | 2017-12-19 | Prince Valiant Vol. 1-3 Gift Box | 1937–1942 | 978-1-68396-072-0 |
| 2 | 2018-12-18 | Prince Valiant Vol. 4-6 Gift Box | 1943–1948 | 978-1-68396-145-1 |
| 3 | 2020-12-01 | Prince Valiant Vol. 7-9 Gift Box | 1949–1954 | 978-1-68396-248-9 |
| 4 | 2021-12-07 | Prince Valiant Vol. 10-12 Gift Box | 1955–1960 | 978-1-68396-490-2 |
| 5 | 2022-12-06 | Prince Valiant Vol. 13-15 Gift Box | 1961–1966 | 978-1-68396-672-2 |
| 6 | 2023-12-05 | Prince Valiant Vol. 16-18 Gift Box | 1967–1972 | 978-1-68396-885-6 |
| 7 | 2025-11-18 | Prince Valiant Vol. 19-21: Gift Box Set | 1973-1978 | 9798875000829 |
