= John Cullen Murphy =

American illustrator

- J. Cullen Murphy at his drawing table, early 1950s
- Born: May 3, 1919; New York City, New York, U.S.
- Died: July 2, 2004 (aged 85); Cos Cob, Connecticut, U.S.
- Known for: Illustration, comics
- Notable work: Prince Valiant, Big Ben Bolt
- Spouse: Joan Byrne
- Children: 8
- Awards: National Cartoonists Society's Story Comic Strip Award, Elzie Segar Award

John Cullen Murphy (May 3, 1919 – July 2, 2004) was an American illustrator best known for his three decades of work on the Prince Valiant comic strip.

== Early life and education ==
Born in New York City, Murphy spent his childhood in Chicago and in New Rochelle, New York, where his family moved in 1930.

He started art classes at the age of 9, but aspired to be a baseball player. He received supervision from artists like George Bridgman, Norman Rockwell, Charles Chapman and Franklin Booth. He was playing baseball one afternoon when he got attention of Norman Rockwell, his New Rochelle neighbor, who asked the 15-year-old if he would like to pose for some magazine ads. Rockwell's Starstruck, showing a forlorn Murphy gazing at pictures of movie starlets, was the September 22, 1934 cover of The Saturday Evening Post. The experience inspired the young Murphy to become an illustrator. Rockwell became one of his good friends and mentors. Murphy started his career early, selling his first illustrations while he was still in high school. After high school, he studied in New York City at the Phoenix Art Institute and the Art Students League, where he was taught by the anatomist George Bridgman.

== Army service ==
Murphy entered the U.S. Army in 1940, joining the 7th Regiment. He became an anti-aircraft officer during World War II, rising to the rank of major. He spent several years in the Pacific, beginning in Australia and ending in Tokyo. He was an aide to General William F. Marquat, who was on General Douglas MacArthur's staff. During the war, Murphy continued to illustrate, sending work to the Chicago Tribune and painting numerous portraits of military figures, including MacArthur.

== Work ==
=== Magazine illustration ===
Murphy's first professional work at the age of seventeen was for Madison Square Garden's publicity department, drawing boxing cartoons. On average two of his cartoons a week were published by sports magazines in Chicago. He resumed his art career upon his return from military service. During the 1940s, he was a popular magazine illustrator, regularly seen in Collier's, Look, Esquire, Liberty, Sport, Holiday and Columbia, published by the Knights of Columbus.

=== Big Ben Bolt ===
Murphy's art often depicted sports subjects. His boxing material unexpectedly led him into the comic strip field, something he had never previously considered. In 1950, writer Elliot Caplin (brother of cartoonist Al Capp) of King Features Syndicate asked Murphy to illustrate a boxing comic strip he was planning to write. Murphy accepted his invitation. The resulting daily comic strip, Big Ben Bolt, was launched in 1950 and ran until 1978.

=== Prince Valiant ===
Murphy began his collaboration on Prince Valiant (the saga of a young Norse prince who becomes a knight of King Arthur's round table at Camelot) with creator Hal Foster in 1970 when Foster decided to lessen his workload at age 78. From the fall of 1970 until early 1980 Foster sent Murphy pencilled layouts, notes, and initially scripts. With Foster's retirement in 1979, Murphy's son Cullen took over the writing. Cullen Murphy began contributing stories to Foster while studying at Amherst College. Bill Crouch also contributed six story lines over the next four years. Murphy continued to draw Prince Valiant with his son scripting and his daughter doing the lettering and coloring until his retirement in March 2004, when he turned the strip over to his chosen successor, illustrator Gary Gianni. Murphy died four months later in Cos Cob, Connecticut.

== Personal life ==
In 1951, Murphy married Joan Byrne, also from New Rochelle. They had eight children. His son, Cullen Murphy (John Cullen Murphy, Jr.), is a writer and magazine editor.

== Skills ==
Murphy never copied Foster's style, preferring a harder pen line instead of the softer brush look, giving the strip a more angular feel. Frank Bolle helped Murphy in layouts and research but Murphy's detailed pen work could still be seen in all the finished pages.

== Awards ==
For his work on Big Ben Bolt and Prince Valiant, Murphy was honored with the National Cartoonists Society's Story Comic Strip Award in 1971 and again for Prince Valiant in 1974, 1976, 1978, 1984 and 1987. He received the Elzie Segar Award in 1983.
