= Big Ben Bolt =

American comic strip by Elliot Caplin

- John Cullen Murphy's Big Ben Bolt (July 26, 1978).
- Author: Elliot Caplin
- Illustrator(s): John Cullen Murphy (1950–1975); Carlos Garzon (1975–1977); Joe Kubert (1977); Gray Morrow (1977–1978); Neal Adams (1978)
- Current status/schedule: Concluded; Daily & Sunday
- Launch date: February 20, 1950
- End date: April 15, 1978
- Syndicate(s): King Features Syndicate
- Genre(s): Sports, adventure

Big Ben Bolt is a comic strip that was syndicated from February 20, 1950 to April 15, 1978. It was drawn by John Cullen Murphy, written by Elliot Caplin, and distributed by King Features Syndicate. The strip followed the adventures of boxer and journalist Ben Bolt.

== Publication history ==
Big Ben Bolt panel from 1950, the strip's first year.

In 1950, writer Elliot Caplin (brother of Li'l Abner cartoonist Al Capp) suggested that Murphy illustrate a boxing comic strip he had in mind. Comics historian Don Markstein wrote:

King Features Syndicate launched Ben's daily strip on February 20, 1950, and the Sunday version on May 25, 1952. The character's name was probably taken from Thomas Dunn English's poem, "Ben Bolt", which has remained popular since it first appeared in 1843.

Murphy was the artist of Big Ben Bolt from 1950 to 1977. He occasionally used assistants, including Al Williamson (Flash Gordon), Alex Kotzky (Apartment 3-G), Neal Adams (Deadman), John Celardo (Tarzan) and Stan Drake (The Heart of Juliet Jones). In 1971, Murphy took over Prince Valiant, and Carlos Garzon became a regular inker. Eventually Murphy left the strip, and Garzon began signing the strip in 1975. After Garzon left in 1977, Joe Kubert stepped in to draw Big Ben Bolt, followed by Gray Morrow who eventually signed the strip starting August 1, 1977. He was followed by Neal Adams. Big Ben Bolt ended on April 15, 1978.

King Features' email service, DailyINK, began carrying Big Ben Bolt in June 2010.

== Characters and story ==
As Markstein writes,

Ben himself ran against stereotype. Instead of a big, dumb hitting machine, he was an articulate college graduate who had chosen a boxing career because he enjoyed and was good at it (winning the world heavyweight championship early on), not because other fields weren't open to him. In fact, when, in 1955, an injury took him out of the ring, he went into journalism. For decades, his adventures revolved around writing about, rather than practicing, his chosen sport.

== Awards ==
Murphy received the National Cartoonists Society's Award for Story Comic Strip for 1971 for his work on Big Ben Bolt and Prince Valiant.
