= Reading Eagle =

Newspaper in Reading, Pennsylvania

- The July 27, 2005, front page of the Reading Eagle
- Type: Daily newspaper
- Format: Broadsheet (1867–2009; 2018–) Berliner (2009–2018)
- Owner: Reading Eagle Company
- Publisher: MediaNews Group
- Founded: 1867
- Headquarters: 345 Penn St. Reading, Pennsylvania; 19603-0582, U.S.
- ISSN: 2469-3448
- OCLC number: 232117921
- Website: readingeagle.com

The Reading Eagle is the daily newspaper in Reading, Pennsylvania. A family-owned newspaper until the spring of 2019, its reported circulation is 37,000 (daily) and 50,000 (Sundays). It serves the Reading and Berks County region of Pennsylvania.

After celebrating its sesquicentennial of local ownership and editorial control in 2018, the Reading Eagle was acquired by the Denver-based MediaNews Group's Digital First Media in May 2019.

== History ==
The newspaper was founded on January 28, 1867. Initially an afternoon paper, it was published Monday through Saturday, and a Sunday morning edition was added later.

In 1940, The Eagle acquired the Reading Times, which was the city's morning paper, though they remained editorially separate newspapers. The staff of the two papers was combined in 1982. In June 2002, the Reading Times ceased publication, and the Eagle became a morning paper. The two newspapers published a joint Saturday-morning edition since 1988.

Author John Updike worked at The Eagle as a copyboy in his youth for several summer internships in the early 1950s, and wrote several feature articles.

In 2009, the newspaper switched to a Berliner format and laid off 52 employees in late April of that year.

After celebrating its sesquicentennial of local ownership and editorial control, the family-owned newspaper suffered financial hardships, and cut 16 percent of its newsroom staff on May 23, 2018. Several months later, it reverted to its previous broadsheet size. Less than a year later, the company announced it was filing for bankruptcy protection on March 20, 2019. In May 2019, the newspaper was acquired by the Denver-based MediaNews Group's Digital First Media division in May 2019. As of July 1, 2021, MNG has laid off numerous employees from the newsroom, where no salary increases have been issued since 2008. MNG also doesn't contribute to a 401(k) plan.

== Sunday edition ==
For many years, the Sunday Reading Eagle featured a banner on its Sunday comics section advertised as the "Biggest Comics Section in the Land", and ran over 50 features until the late 1980s. Until 1995, it occupied two sections. It carried half pages of Prince Valiant, Hägar the Horrible, and Tarzan, and smaller versions of Dick Tracy, The Phantom, and other popular humor strips. On July 8, 2018, however, it followed the path of most dwindling American newspapers, and reduced the size of its comics section and of the strips it carries.
