= Lance (comic strip) =

American comic strip by Warren Tufts

- Warren Tufts's Lance (May 5, 1957)
- Author: Warren Tufts
- Current status/schedule: Concluded daily and Sunday strip
- Launch date: June 5, 1955
- End date: May 29, 1960
- Syndicate(s): Self-syndicated

Lance was an American comic strip notable as the last of the full-page strips. Created and self-syndicated by artist Warren Tufts, it ran from June 5, 1955, to May 29, 1960.

== Publication history ==
Lance premiered on Sunday, June 5, 1955, launching in approximately 100 newspapers. The strip was self-syndicated by artist Warren Tufts, creator of the 1949-1955 strip Casey Ruggles. Originally formatted like Prince Valiant, with text in captions but minus word balloons, it eventually switched to using word balloons. The last full page was #85. After that, the strip appeared in half page and tab formats.

A daily strip began January 14, 1957 and lasted at least until February 15, 1958. Tufts's Casey Ruggles was referenced when Ruggles made a brief appearance in the daily strip.

The final Lance strip was #261, published May 29, 1960.

== Characters and story ==
Lance starred U.S. cavalry officer Lance St. Lorne, stationed at Fort Leavenworth, Kansas in the mid-19th century. In tales of settling the Old West frontier, the character crossed paths with such figures as Kit Carson and others. Comics historian Don Markstein said the strip was "characterized by high-quality stories and art, but also by historical accuracy. Unlike, say, Lucky Luke, when Lance met someone who had really lived, that person was as old as he'd actually have been at the time, and in circumstances congruent with the known course of the person's life."

== Recognition ==
Comics critic Bill Blackbeard rated Lance "the best of the page-high adventure strips undertaken after the 1930s".

== Episode guide ==
- Loud Thunder (#1-15) Fall 1834
- Trappers and Scouts (#16-55) Winter/Spring 1835
- The Beginning (flashback) (#56-58) 1776 - 1834
- Kit Carson (#59-78) Summer/Fall 1835
- Many Robes (#79-85) Winter 1835–36
- Valle (#86-114) Spring 1836 - Summer 1837
- The Rangers (#115-127) Summer/Fall 1837
- The Pass (#128-139) Winter 1837
- Washington (#140-145) Spring 1838
- Billy Benedict (#146-161) Summer 1838
- California Independence (#162-188) 1838 - 1845
- The War with Mexico (#189-201) 1845
- Wheatcroft (#202-219)
- El Carnicero (#220-231)
- Papita (#232-243)
- Nelly Gray (#244-261) 1847

== Reprints ==
The American Comics Archive reprinted Lance in its Big Fun comics magazine. Big Fun #5, devoted solely to Lance, reprinted Sundays and dailies from June 5, 1955, through August 20, 1957. Comics Revue had Lance as a cover feature on several issues.

The series was completely reprinted with restoration by Manuel Caldas in Portugal (four volumes), Spain (four volumes), Germany (five volumes), and Norway (a four volume edition and a one volume edition) in their respective languages. A four-volume Serbian edition was published by Makondo in 2015.

A complete English language reprint of the strip was published in 2018–2019 by Classic Comics Press.
