= Ruben Moreira =

Puerto Rican comic book artist

- Born: July 27, 1922 Fajardo, Puerto Rico
- Died: May 21, 1984 (aged 61) San Juan, Puerto Rico
- Areas: Penciller, inker, writer
- Pseudonym: Rubimor
- Notable works: Tarzan; Roy Raymond

Ruben Moreira (July 27, 1922 – May 21, 1984) was a Puerto Rican comic book artist and writer best known for his work on Tarzan and as a DC Comics artist.

== Biography ==
Ruben Moreira was born in Fajardo, Puerto Rico and moved with his mother to New York City when he was four. In his twenties he began his career in the world of comics, but before that he studied at Cooper Union, Pratt Institute and the Grand Central School of Art. He started working for Fiction House's Planet Comics on Reef Ryan in July 1942. He later contributed to the Fiction House titles Fight Comics between August and October 1943, to Rangers Comics between October 1943 and August 1944, and to Wings Comics from December 1943 until April 1944. He took over the Tarzan Sunday page from Burne Hogarth in 1945. He was its sole artist and writer until 1947, using the pen name Rubimor. Burne Hogarth then again took over the series.

Later in the 1940s, he created Her Highness and Silk for the Quality Comics publication Hit Comics, and worked on I Confess for the whole run from June 1948 until December 1949 in Rangers Comics.

In 1949, he co-created DC Comics' Roy Raymond, on which he was the main artist for all issues until 1961. Later, he worked for them on titles like The Adventures of Alan Ladd and Wonder Woman. His work also often appeared in House of Mystery and House of Secrets. In 1959, he created Rip Hunter together with Jack Miller.

He also worked for other publishers in this period as well. He collaborated on Warren Tufts' Casey Ruggles for a while.

He went back to Puerto Rico in 1958 and ended his comics career in 1962. He died from cancer in 1984.

A Rubimor Sunday page is part of the Library of Congress American Treasures collection.

== Moreira's characters ==
Moreira is credited with creating at least three characters: Black Terror, Puzzler and Beggar King.
