= Our Own Oddities =

American comic strip by Ralph Graczak

- Ralph Graczak's Our Own Oddities (January 25, 1953)
- Author(s): Ralph Graczak
- Current status/schedule: Concluded weekly strip
- Launch date: September 1, 1940
- End date: February 24, 1991
- Alternate name(s): St. Louis Oddities
- Publisher(s): St. Louis Post-Dispatch
- Genre(s): Bizarre facts

Our Own Oddities is an illustrated panel that ran in the Sunday comics section of the St. Louis Post-Dispatch from September 1, 1940 to February 24, 1991. The feature displayed curiosities submitted by local readers and is often remembered for its drawings of freakish produce, such as a potato that resembled Richard Nixon. The style of the panel was very similar to Ripley's Believe it or Not!.

== Publication history ==
When it began September 1, 1940, it was titled St. Louis Oddities. The title changed in the late 1940s.

The panel was produced by Post-Dispatch illustrator Ralph Graczak (pronounced Gray-zak). He retired from the newspaper in 1980, but he continued to produce Our Own Oddities until it ended, in addition to doing a talk show on St. Louis's KMOX radio. He died of a heart attack on August 3, 1997.

== Content ==
The curiosities, including actual fruits and vegetables, were submitted to Graczak, who each week selected several items and produced a color illustration to be printed in the Sunday paper.

In addition to bizarre produce, Our Own Oddities featured other peculiar local trivia, such as a local woman who lived at 1919 Montgomery Street and was born at nine o'clock on August 19, 1919. Clever church signs and tombstone epitaphs were popular features.

=== Anniversary special ===
In September 2003, the Post-Dispatch accepted submissions for a 63rd anniversary special of Our Own Oddities. The best submissions, including a duck-shaped cucumber and a woman born on December 7, 1941, with the initials W.A.R., were illustrated by Post-Dispatch artist Dan Martin and featured in the October 6, 2003, edition.

== Controversy ==
Despite its quaint illustrated style and typically benign subjects, the feature was the cause of controversy when on May 24, 1988, it included a sign on a truck-repair shop that read "These premises protected by a pit bull with AIDS." The newspaper printed several angry letters. Graczak and the newspaper's features editor expressed regret.
