= Gary Gianni =

American comic artist (born 1954)

- Born: 1954 (age 71–72) Chicago, Illinois
- Areas: Cartoonist, Writer, Penciller, Inker
- Notable works: Prince Valiant; The MonsterMen
- Awards: Inkpot Award (2012)

Gary Gianni (born 1954) is an American comics artist best known for his eight years illustrating the syndicated newspaper comic Prince Valiant.

After Gianni graduated from the Chicago Academy of Fine Arts in 1976, he worked for the Chicago Tribune as an illustrator and network television news as a courtroom sketch artist.

== Career ==
He illustrated numerous magazines, children's books and paperbacks. His comic book debut was in 1990 with adaptations of The Tales of O. Henry and 20,000 Leagues Under the Sea for the Classics Illustrated series. He went on to work for Dark Horse Comics, where he contributed to Indiana Jones and the Shrine of the Sea Devil and The Shadow. After John Cullen Murphy retired from Prince Valiant in 2004, Gianni began drawing the strip, continuing until March 25, 2012, when Thomas Yeates became the strip's illustrator on April 1, 2012.

As an illustrator he illustrated Wandering Star Press's Savage Tales of Solomon Kane (1998) and Bran Mak Morn: The Last King (2001) by Robert E. Howard, Gentlemen of the Road by Michael Chabon (2007), and A Knight of the Seven Kingdoms, a prequel to George R.R. Martin's A Song of Ice and Fire series. In 2024, he illustrated The Alchemist by Paulo Coelho for Lyra's Press, published in three different special editions featuring the same illustrations. The Lettered Edition won the prestigious "Best British Book" award at the British Book Design and Production Award in London on April, 2026.

== Awards ==
Gianni won the 1997 Best Short Story Eisner Award for his collaborating with Archie Goodwin on Heroes in DC Comics' Batman: Black & White.

== Sources ==
- Howard, Robert E. (June 29, 2004). The Savage Tales of Solomon Kane. Random House Publishing Group. p. 407. ISBN 9780345478511.
