= The Heart of Juliet Jones =

American comic strip (1953–2000)

- Stan Drake's The Heart of Juliet Jones
- Author: Elliot Caplin
- Illustrator(s): Stan Drake (1953-1989); Frank Bolle (1989-2000)
- Current status/schedule: Concluded; Daily & Sunday
- Launch date: March 9, 1953
- End date: January 1, 2000
- Syndicate(s): King Features Syndicate
- Genre: Soap opera

The Heart of Juliet Jones is an American comic strip series created by Elliott Caplin and drawn by Stan Drake, beginning on March 9, 1953. The strip was distributed by King Features Syndicate.

The strip was a soap opera, following the prototype set by Mary Worth but elevated by Drake's exceptional artwork. The strip's first storylines were based on a treatment by writer Margaret Mitchell. The figure drawing was characterized by Drake's pioneering use of naturalistic movement and expression, a style he achieved partly through the use of Polaroid photographic reference.

== Publication history ==
Drake's last strip was published May 20, 1989 with the Sundays already having ended on December 10, 1988; the daily strip was continued by Frank Bolle through the January 1, 2000 strip, which ended the series with an unresolved cliffhanger.

== Characters and story ==
Much of the dramatic tension was realized through the interaction of two dissimilar sisters. Brunette Juliet Jones, the older, was modest, sensible and successful. Buxom blonde Eve Jones was flirty, flighty, and in and out of trouble. Their elderly father Howard, a decent but dull man easily swayed by both of his daughters, also played a leading role. Initially, Eve was more villainous, and tried to steal Juliet's boyfriend (who was also her teacher). However, as the strip progressed, Eve became less selfish and established a good relationship with Juliet.

By the 1970s, the strip's scope would greatly expand, with storylines running the gamut of genres, from comedy, full-on adventure, Gothic melodrama romantic tragedy--Eve even had a storyline that was a full on riff on women-in-prison films. Most notably, Juliet married world-renowned lawyer Owen Cantrell in 1970, a marriage that would last until a tragic ending, fifteen years later. The main setting now was New York City, with only occasional visits to the small town of Devon to see Pops. The wildly varied tone from story to story did leave some inconsistencies--for example, at one point Eve adopts the child of a boyfriend who dies but after a few months the character is forgotten, presumably to more easily tell future stories.

Despite these major changes to the strip's tone and setting, the consistency of Drake's art and of Caplin's characterization meant that none of these changes seemed jarring in the way they are with other comic strips that metamorphose over the decades.

== Books ==
Stan Drake's The Heart of Juliet Jones (1953) with Eve (left) and Juliet.

A full reprinting in book form of Drake's work on the strip was begun by Classic Comics Press in late 2008, but however after volume four, has been put indefinitely put on hold due to lack of sales.

- The Heart of Juliet Jones vol. 1, Classic Comics Press, 2009 (Reprints dailies March 8, 1953 - August 13, 1955)
- The Heart of Juliet Jones vol. 2, Classic Comics Press, 2009 (Reprints dailies August 15, 1955 - November 30, 1957)
- The Heart of Juliet Jones vol. 3, Classic Comics Press, 2010 (Reprints dailies December 2, 1957 - January 23, 1960)
- The Heart of Juliet Jones vol. 4, Classic Comics Press, 2014 (Reprints Sundays May 2, 1954 - August 3, 1958)
- Juliette Jones 1 : 1953-1954, Futuropolis (1984) French edition
- Juliette Jones 2 : 1954-1955, Futuropolis (1984) French edition

== Awards ==
Drake received the National Cartoonists Society's Story Comic Strip Award in 1968, 1970 and 1972.

== Sources ==
- Strickler, Dave. Syndicated Comic Strips and Artists, 1924-1995: The Complete Index. Cambria, California: Comics Access, 1995. ISBN 0-9700077-0-1
