= Broom-Hilda =

Comic strip

- Author: Russell Myers
- Website: www.gocomics.com/broomhilda
- Current status/schedule: Running
- Launch date: April 19, 1970
- Syndicate(s): Tribune Content Agency
- Genre: Humor

Broom-Hilda is an American newspaper comic strip created by cartoonist Russell Myers. Distributed by Tribune Content Agency, it depicts the misadventures of a man-crazy, cigar-smoking, beer-guzzling, 1,500-year-old witch and her motley crew of friends.

The original idea for Broom-Hilda came from Elliot Caplin, brother of Li'l Abner cartoonist Al Capp. He described the main character to Myers, who responded with a sketch of the witch and several samples. Caplin, acting as Myers' business manager, submitted these to the Chicago Tribune Syndicate. Introduced on April 19, 1970, the strip became an immediate success. Broom-Hilda was reprinted in several collections during the 1970s and 1980s.

== Characters and story ==
Although events mostly take place during the present in an unidentified forest, the setting changes. Locales change drastically from day to day—and background details can change from panel to panel within the same strip, while the characters remain stationary (much like the backgrounds in Krazy Kat). Broom-Hilda is also capable of time travel, reappearing in various centuries throughout history to chat with (burlesque versions of) diverse historical figures.

- Broom-Hilda (a pun on Brünnhilde) is a short, pudgy witch with green skin, long stringy hair, and a wart on the end of her nose. She wears a black dress, black shoes, striped stockings (one perpetually drooping) and a black hat with a daisy on top. According to the strip's official site, Broom-Hilda is Attila the Hun's ex-wife. She is perpetually looking for a new husband, but, due to her abrasive nature, the quest has thus far been unsuccessful. Early in the strip's run, she gave up cigar smoking and beer. She served in the United States Marine Corps for two days and was discharged for unnecessary roughness (glimpses of her underwear reveal a USMC label). A hint to her rough-hewn side occurs in one strip where she is shown buying underwear. The clerk suggests a set, each pair bearing a day of the week. She asks if she can get a set with the months of the year.
- Irwin Troll has much hair, but little intelligence. Perpetually innocent and naïve to the point of imbecility, Irwin is a simple-minded, sweet-natured, nature-loving character — very unlike Broom-Hilda.
- Gaylord Buzzard is a neurotic intellectual who wears thick, horn-rimmed glasses, shoes with spats, and (sometimes) a fez for reading. Worldly, egotistical and sarcastic, he enjoys playing practical jokes on the other characters, particularly Broom-Hilda. Gaylord is a vegetarian. He bears the scar of a youth spent in movie theaters: He's hopelessly addicted to popcorn.
- Nerwin Troll is Irwin's smart-aleck nephew, attaining the name from a newspaper contest as a blend of "nerd" and "Irwin". Irwin broke the fourth wall to address readers. Nerwin is often drawn wearing a propeller beanie, giving him the look of a stereotypical comic strip representation of a bratty juvenile delinquent, and he has also been known to frequently behave as such.
- Grelber is never seen except for his eyes and perpetually grinning teeth, always peering out from a hollow log perched on the edge of a cliff. Mysterious and openly malevolent, he regularly dispenses "Free insults", as a sign at the entrance of his log proclaims.
- Wolfie is Broom-Hilda's small, timid pet wolf. Though an animal who never speaks, he is capable of intelligent thought, à la Snoopy.
- Big Lump, a large dinosaur-like creature, appeared in the strip's early years.

== Animation ==
Broom-Hilda was adapted twice for animated television series. The first was part of Archie's TV Funnies (1971), an animated series set in a television station run by Archie Andrews and his friends. Broom-Hilda was one of the comic strips featured on the show, along with Dick Tracy, Moon Mullins, Emmy Lou, The Captain and the Kids, The Dropouts, Nancy and Smokey Stover. The series was produced by Filmation Associates and aired on CBS. Broom-Hilda's voice was provided by Jane Webb (also the voice of Betty Cooper and Veronica Lodge).

Broom-Hilda returned in another Filmation series, Fabulous Funnies (1978). Thirteen episodes were produced, and the series aired for one season on NBC. The show featured animated versions of several famous comic strips, including Tumbleweeds, Alley Oop and Nancy. Voices were provided by June Foray (Broom-Hilda and additional voices), Alan Oppenheimer (Irwin, Gaylord, Grelber and additional voices), Bob Holt (additional voices) and Jayne Hamil (additional voices).

The character also made a brief animated appearance in The Fantastic Funnies (1980), a CBS special showcasing newspaper comics and their creators. The animated sequence was produced by Bill Melendez Productions. June Foray was brought back to voice the character.

== Other media ==
A live-action Broom-Hilda sketch was included in the special Mother's Day Sunday Funnies broadcast May 8, 1983, on NBC.

In 2004, it was announced that there would be a Broadway musical based on the comic strip characters, written by Martin Charnin (Annie) and Kurt Andersen (Spy magazine). The music was composed by Leroy Anderson. There was discussion of casting with Andersen suggesting Catherine Zeta-Jones for the title role, but the show was not produced.

Grelber also appeared as a computer program on old Unix systems. Typing the command "Grelber" would cause the computer to insult the user.

== Awards ==
Myers won the National Cartoonists Society's Humor Comic Strip Award for 1975 for his work on the strip. As of 2023, he holds the record for most comic strips drawn by one person, without assistance, for Broom-Hilda, with over 19,000 daily and Sunday comic strips over 53 years, according to writer and comics expert Mark Evanier.

Caplin died in 2000. Myers continues to write and draw the strip, compiling a large backlog of strips in the event poor health were to prevent him from meeting his syndication requirements. In 2024, Myers won a Guinness World Records Award for the most comic strips drawn by one person for the longest period of time (54 years) in the world.

== Russell Myers collections ==
- Broom-Hilda (1971) Lancer Books
- I Love You, Broom-Hilda (1973) Tempo Books
- Broom-Hilda Rides Again! (1975) Tempo
- Ugly Is as Ugly Does: The Broom-Hilda Story (1976) Tempo
- Flying Low with Broom-Hilda (1976) Tempo
- Broom-Hilda Presents: Mother Nature's Personal Friend, Irwin Troll (1976) Tempo
- Losing Control with Broom-Hilda (1976) Tempo
- Popcorn Sandwiches! A Broom-Hilda Book (1977) Tempo
- Broom-Hilda: Baying at the Moon and Other Tales of Unrequited Love (1977) Tempo
- Boo! Broom-Hilda (1977) Tempo
- X-Rated X-Rays: A Broom-Hilda Book (1978) Tempo
- Broom-Hilda: Growing Old Gracelessly and Other Indignities (1978) Tempo
- Broom-Hilda: Never Stilt-Walk in Gopher Country (1978) Ace Books
- Broom-Hilda: Life Begins at 1500 (1981) Fawcett
- Open at You Own Risk!! A Broom-Hilda Book (1981) Fawcett
- Broom-Hilda: (Comic) Strip Tease (1982) Fawcett
- Broom-Hilda: Sneaky Volcanos (1982) Fawcett
- Broom-Hilda: Doing What I Do Best (1984) Fawcett
- Broom-Hilda: Never Trust Short Green People! (1984) Fawcett
- Broom-Hilda: I Always Get My Mountie! (1985) Fawcett
- Broom-Hilda: Lookin' Good! (1985) Fawcett
- Broom-Hilda: Space Junk (1986) Fawcett
- Broom-Hilda: One Rotten Apple (1986) Fawcett
- Broom-Hilda: Sore Loser (1987) Fawcett
- Broom-Hilda: The Backward Heimlich (1987) Fawcett

== Theme park ==
At Universal Islands of Adventure, in Toon Lagoon, Broom-Hilda can be seen in the entrance of Comic Strip Cafe. She also appeared in the live show Pandemonium Cartoon Circus, with June Foray reprising her role.
