= Russell Myers =

American cartoonist (born 1938)

- Born: Russell Kommer Myers; October 9, 1938 (age 88) Pittsburg, Kansas, United States
- Areas: Cartoonist, Illustrator
- Notable works: Broom-Hilda, Hallmark Cards
- Awards: National Cartoonists Society - Best Humour Strip (1975)

Russell Myers' Broom-Hilda

Russell Kommer Myers (born October 9, 1938) is an American cartoonist best known for his newspaper comic strip Broom-Hilda.

Born in Pittsburg, Kansas, Myers was raised in Oklahoma where his father taught at the University of Tulsa. Myers was interested in cartooning from an early age. After his first strip submission for syndication failed, he began working for Hallmark Cards in Kansas City, MO in 1960 as an illustrator of greeting cards. He continued to submit comic strip concepts for syndication in his free time.

== Broom-Hilda ==
The idea for Broom-Hilda originally came from writer Elliott Caplin, brother of cartoonist Al Capp, who described the character to Myers. Myers designed the characters and wrote the scripts. Caplin acted as Myers' business agent and submitted Broom-Hilda to the Chicago Tribune Syndicate where it was accepted. The first strip was published on 19 April 1970.

== Personal ==
Russell and Marina Myers married in 1964 and lived in the Kansas City area until moving to Grants Pass, Oregon. The Myers family includes son Stewart and daughter Rosie. As Russell Myers noted, "We live in Oregon with seven dogs, three horses, and a pond full of koi and grow moss on our north sides." His hobbies include, "reading, collecting old cars, and hanging out at our local Saturday night dirt track, where I sponsor a car and wish I was brave enough to drive."

== Awards ==
Myers received the 1975 National Cartoonists Society's Best Humor Strip Award. In 2024, Myers received a Gold Key from the National Cartoonists Society, which is awarded by unanimous vote of the NCS Board of Directors. The Gold Key honors the recipient as a National Cartoonists Society Hall of Fame member.
