= Warren Tufts =

American comic artist (1925–1982)

- Born: Chester Warren Tufts; December 12, 1925 Fresno, California
- Died: July 6, 1982 (aged 56) Placerville, California
- Areas: Cartoonist, Writer, Artist
- Notable works: Casey Ruggles; Lance

Chester Warren Tufts (December 12, 1925 – July 6, 1982), best known as Warren Tufts, was an American comic strip and comic book artist-writer best known for his syndicated Western adventure strip Casey Ruggles, which ran from 1949 to 1954.

== Comic strips ==
In 1949, Warren Tufts created the comic strip Casey Ruggles, set against the backdrop of the Old West. Distributed by United Feature, launching May 22, 1949, it initially appeared only in the Sunday comics, but when the story became popular, a daily strip was added. Because Tufts was a perfectionist who often worked 80-hour weeks, he had trouble meeting deadlines, even though he had help from numerous assistants and ghosts: Nick Cardy, Ruben Moreira, Al Plastino and Alex Toth.

As Casey Ruggles' popularity grew, Tufts received an offer from a major television studio to produce a Casey Ruggles TV show. However, United Feature nixed the offer on the grounds that a TV show would make the strip less popular. In anger, Tufts left United Feature in 1954, and Casey Ruggles ended shortly afterward, as the replacement artist, Al Carreño, apparently could not maintain reader interest. Tufts' contract with the syndicate required that they be given first refusal on his next strip, so he created The Lone Spaceman, a science-fiction Lone Ranger parody he was sure United Feature would refuse. After the syndicate did, Tufts reconsidered the strip's value and self-syndicated it. He then created, wrote, drew and self-syndicated one of the last full-page comic strips, the Old West cavalry adventure Lance, which comics critic Bill Blackbeard called "the best of the page-high adventure strips undertaken after the 1930s".

== Comic books ==
However, the job of not only writing and drawing but also traveling around the country from city to city to sell the strip proved daunting, and in 1960, Tufts left the comic strip field. He drew some comic books for Gold Key Comics, including Korak, Son of Tarzan, The Pink Panther, The Amazing Chan and the Chan Clan and Wagon Train, but the fast pace and low pay of the comic book industry at that time kept him from doing his best work.

He also drew an adult comic book, Jack and the Beanstalk, and wrote and illustrated a serialized story for Sports Flying magazine.

Warren Tufts' Casey Ruggles (March 27, 1954)

== Television ==
On TV, he lent his voice, lips and artistic talents to Cambria Studios' production of the Syncro-Vox series Captain Fathom (1965), and is credited as story director on Hanna-Barbera's ABC Saturday Superstar Movie (1972) and Challenge of the Super Friends (1978). He also played the character Gator in the "Dos Pinos" episode of the TV series The Westerner (1960).

He was killed in 1982, in the crash of an airplane of his own design that he was piloting. He was living in El Dorado County, California, at the time.
