= Frank Bolle =

American cartoonist (1924–2020)

- Born: June 23, 1924 Italy
- Died: May 12, 2020 (aged 95) Weston, Connecticut
- Areas: Cartoonist, Penciller, Inker, Letterer
- Pseudonyms: FWB; F. L. Blake
- Notable works: Winnie Winkle; The Heart of Juliet Jones; Boys' Life; Doctor Solar, Man of the Atom
- Awards: Inkpot Award (2003)

External image
- Frank Bolle, Westport, Connecticut, Public Library, August 2009. Archived from the original on December 4, 2017.

Frank W. Bolle (June 23, 1924 – May 12, 2020) was an American comic-strip artist, comic book artist and illustrator, best known as the longtime artist of the newspaper strips Winnie Winkle and The Heart of Juliet Jones; for stints on the comic books Tim Holt and Doctor Solar, Man of the Atom; and as an illustrator for the Boy Scouts of America magazine Boys' Life for 18 years. With an unknown writer, he co-created the masked, Old West comic-book heroine the Black Phantom. Bolle sometimes used the pen name FWB and, at least once, F. L. Blake.

== Early life ==
Frank Bolle was born in Italy and immigrated to the United States at age 5 to join his mother in Brooklyn, New York, although Bolle in adulthood said he was born in Brooklyn. He grew up in that borough with mother Mary and stepfather Egidio "Louie" Covacich. Bolle attended Manhattan's High School of Music & Art, though one standard reference source, attributing its information to Bolle via an intermediary, lists the School of Industrial Art high school. From 1943 to 1946, Bolle served in the United States Army Air Force, and after his return from World War II attended Pratt Institute on the G.I. Bill, graduating in three years.

== Career ==
=== 1940s and 1950s ===
Bolle broke into comics in 1943, drawing backgrounds for Funnies Inc., one of a handful of "packagers" that supplied content to publishers entering the fledgling medium of comic books. His first known credits are penciling and inking two "Terry Vance" detective features for Timely Comics, the precursor of Marvel Comics, in Marvel Mystery Comics #47–48 (cover-dated Sept.-Oct. 1943). He served in World War II, and it is unclear if the small number of Bolle stories that appear in comics from U.S. Camera, Rural Home, and Green Publishing through 1946 were done during the war or were inventory from before his service. His comics output became regular soon afterward with a "Freddy Freshman" story in Fawcett Comics' Captain Marvel Jr. #46 (Feb. 1947) and work in Crown Comics from the publisher McCombs from 1947 to 1948. He did additional work for Fawcett, and signed some of his Lev Gleason Publications comics work FWB.

Bolle himself, in an undated interview, conducted no earlier than 1992, did not mention his prewar work when asked about "the first comic book you worked on":

The first job I got... I had some samples I did for a little tiny outlet called Crown Comics [sic; title of series published by McCombs] where I wrote some stories and I started out by doing a filler — they had a 48-pager but they had space in the back, so they needed a one-page story. I said, 'If you need it Monday, I'll bring it in on Monday', and I wrote a cute little story and they printed it on the back and that was my first sample. Those were the first books I worked on when I got out of the service after World War II. I was 21 or 22.

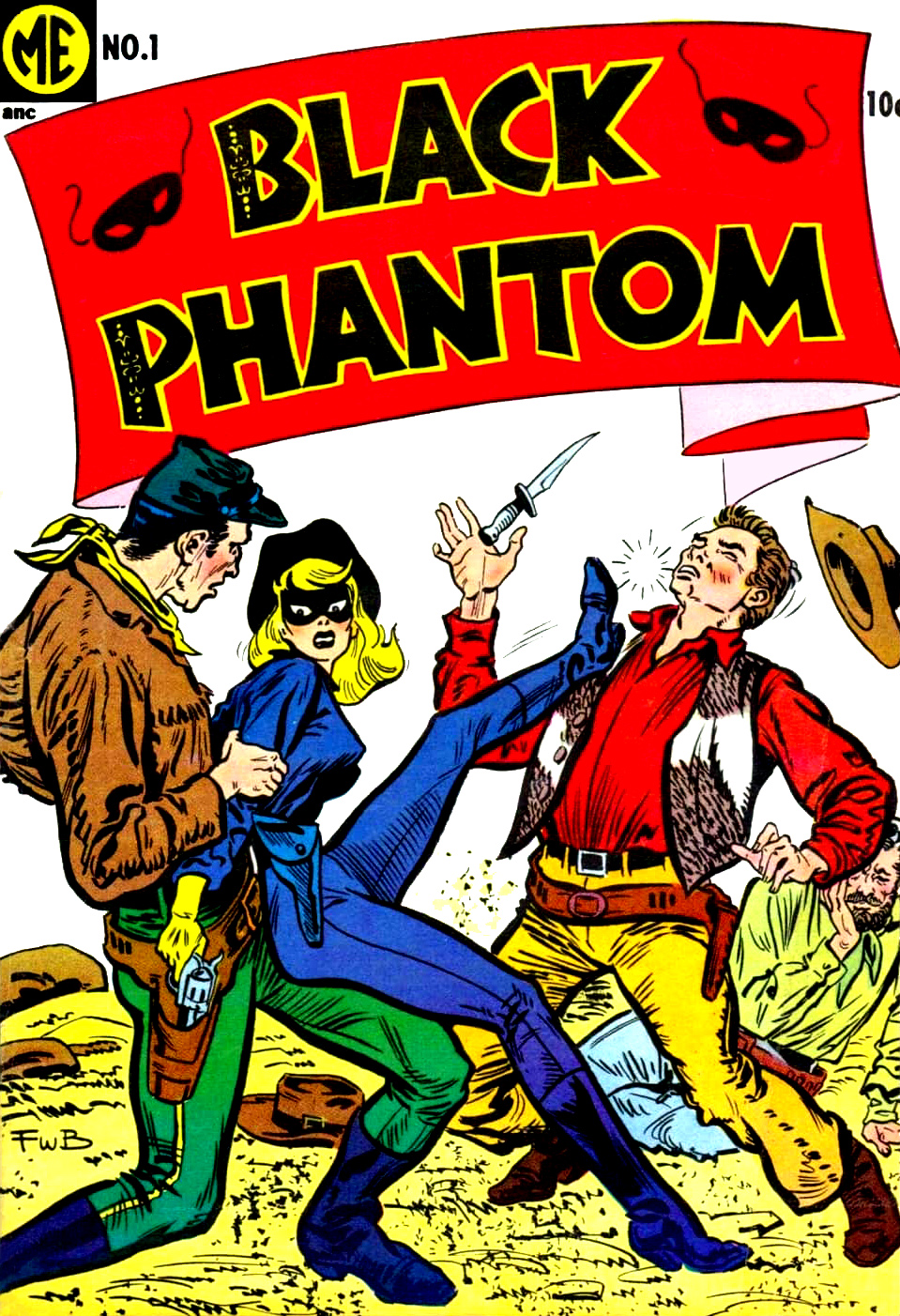
Black Phantom #1 (1954; no cover date). Cover art by Bolle.

With an unknown writer, Bolle co-created the masked Old West heroine the Black Phantom in Magazine Enterprises' Western comic Tim Holt #25 (Sept. 1951). Through 1954, he also drew the title feature as well as the backup feature "Redmask", then took over the art for the spinoff series Red Mask, drawing issues #42–53 to (July 1954 – May 1956).

From 1955 to 1957, Bolle drew Robin Hood stories in ME's Robin Hood and the subsequent, TV series-based The Adventures of Robin Hood. For Marvel Comics' 1950s forerunner, Atlas Comics, he drew supernatural fantasy stories in the anthologies Mystic, Marvel Tales, Strange Tales, Journey into Mystery and other titles in 1956 and 1957. As well by the mid-1950s, Bolle was illustrating juvenile fiction books, including Gene Autry & Champion (1956), and books starring Lassie and the Lone Ranger. He would later draw for the Choose Your Own Adventure children's book series.

From 1957 to 1961, Bolle began his long career in newspaper comic strips, starting as an art assistant, drawing backgrounds, on the Chicago Tribune-New York News Syndicate's daily and Sunday On Stage from 1957 to 1961.

=== 1960s ===
This briefly overlapped his own Sunday comic strip, the McNaught Syndicate's Children's Tales, which he wrote and drew from 1960 to 1969. He recalled it as "a Sunday page where I illustrated some classics like 'Cinderella' and 'Rumplestilskin' and I did them in three parts so they would appear on three Sundays. And in-between that I would also write original stories, so I wrote about 12 to 15 original stories, then I would switch back and forth from classics to originals." For the same syndicate, he drew the daily and Sunday strip Debbie Deere, "a lonely hearts writer [who] would get involved in some of the letters she got. I did that for about 4 years," from 1966 to 1969. For the Chicago Tribune-New York News Syndicate, he wrote and drew the strip Quick Quiz from 1964 to 1965. By this time he was also illustrating for magazines, beginning with the men's adventure title Stag from 1961 to 1962.

He used the pseudonym F. L. Blake for the dust jacket of the 1963 book Picture Parade of Jewish History. Keeping a hand in comic books, Bolle drew the superhero series Doctor Solar, Man of the Atom #6–19 (Nov. 1963 – April 1967) for Western Publishing's Gold Key Comics imprint, and did a small amount of work for DC Comics, Dell Comics, and Tower Comics.

In 1966, Bolle began a long association with the magazine Boys' Life, drawing numerous comic strips for the glossy monthly publication of the Boy Scouts of America. Through 1981, he drew at different times the strips Bible Stories, Green Bar Bill, Pedro Patrol, Pee Wee Harris, Pool of Fire, Scouts in America, Space Adventures, The Tracy Twins and White Mountains. He did other art as well for the magazine, from 1977 to 1984, and drew an adaptation of John Christopher's "The Tripods" as well as an adaptation of Robert A. Heinlein's "Between Planets."

From 1965 to 1975, Bolle drew covers for nonfiction paperback books including Baton Twirling, Invitation to Skin and Scuba Diving, Scuba, Spear & Snorkel, Soccer, and Boxing.

=== 1970s–2000s ===
Two stories he penciled and inked, and one that he inked over penciler Russ Jones, from the paperback anthology Christopher Lee's Treasury of Terror (Pyramid Books, 1966), were reprinted in three 1968 issues of Warren Publications' black-and-white horror comics magazine Eerie. Bolle went on to draw new stories published in that magazine and in its sister publication Vampirella in 1970 and 1971, and in 1973 inked roughly a dozen stories for Marvel Comics, including in issues of The Avengers, The Defenders, Sub-Mariner, Marvel Premiere and Marvel Team-Up. Throughout the 1970s he also continued to do work for longtime clients Dell Comics and Gold Key Comics (in Flash Gordon, Ripley's Believe It or Not!, The Twilight Zone and other titles, including a short return to Doctor Solar, Man of the Atom). Additionally, sometimes under his FWB pseudonym, he also contributed to Charlton Comics.

His comic-strip work in the 1970s included drawing the daily and Sunday Alexander Gates (1970–1971); the title character, Bolle said, "was an astrologist, I did that for a couple of years", For Universal Press Syndicate, he drew the trip Best Seller Showcase daily (1977) and Sunday (1977–1978), which included Raise the Titanic, based on the Clive Cussler novel; for the same syndicate, he drew Encyclopedia Brown daily and Sunday (1978–1980). He was the uncredited ghost artist on the daily Rip Kirby for King Features Syndicate from 1977 to 1994, and, for one month in 1982, the Sunday Tarzan for United Feature Syndicate. In an undated interview conducted no earlier than 1992, he said, "Today, I work on the Prince Valiant strip — I do some of them. It's funny — I grew up reading, admiring and copying Prince Valiant and today I'm the one penciling them!"

Bolle's last known mainstream penciling and inking for comic books is the cover of Gold Key Comics' Shroud of Mystery #1 (June 1982). He later drew a page for the one-shot benefit comic Strip AIDS U.S.A. (1988) from Last Gasp. He returned to ink the last 31 pages of a 42-page story in Marvel's Captain Marvel vol. 2, #1 (Nov. 1989), over penciler Mark Bright.

In the 1980s and 1990s, Bolle drew and lettered the Sunday and daily Tribune Media Services strip Winnie Winkle, either from 1982–1996 or, he has said, "for 20 years". He performed those same functions on King Features' The Heart of Juliet Jones from 1989–2000, which by then had retired its Sunday strips, and was "just dailies". He lettered Tribune's venerable Annie daily and Sunday strips in the 1980s through 1999, contributing, as well, a small amount of art as a ghost artist. Finally, he did ghost art on Tribune Media's Gil Thorp in 1995, 1996 and 2008. Credited, he drew the daily and Sunday North America Syndicate strip Apartment 3-G in 1999. He continued with the strip through its finale in November 2015, by which point Bolle was 91.

From 1996 through at least 2009, Bolle did pet illustrations for the Westport Pet Company, as well as commissioned pet portraits, including one that was scheduled to appear in the Walt Disney Pictures movie Old Dogs. He illustrated the 2008 children's book My Cat Merigold by Angelica Joy.

As late as 2004, he was a guest and panelist at San Diego Comic-Con.

== Awards ==
Bolle was one of 10 recipients of the 2003 Inkpot Award.

== Personal life ==
As an adult, Bolle lived in Weston, Connecticut, with his wife, Lori. He had two children, daughter Laura and son Frank.

Bolle died May 12, 2020, at the age of 95 and was interred at Willowbrook Cemetery in Westport, Connecticut.
