= Toby Press =

Defunct American comic book company

- Founded: 1949
- Founder: Elliott Caplin
- Defunct: 1955
- Country of origin: United States
- Headquarters location: New York City
- Publication types: Comic books
- Fiction genres: Licensed characters, romance, war, Westerns, adventure, talking animals
- Imprints: Minoan

Toby Press was an American comic-book company that published from 1949 to 1955. Founded by Elliott Caplin, brother of cartoonist Al Capp and himself an established comic strip writer, the company published reprints of Capp's Li'l Abner strip; licensed-character comics starring such film and animated cartoon properties as John Wayne and Felix the Cat; and original conceptions, including romance, war, Western, and adventure comics. Some of its comics were published under the imprint Minoan. Some covers bore the logo ANC, standing for American News Company, at the time the country's largest newsstand distributor.

It is unrelated to the book publisher Toby Press, which was acquired by Amazon.com in 2010.

== History ==
Elliott Caplin entered the comic-book field as editor of True Comics for the Parents Magazine Institute. Some years later, he founded Toby Press with reprints of his brother Al Capp's popular newspaper comic strip Li'l Abner, a satire built around hillbilly archetypes. The first Toby comic-book series was Al Capp's Li'l Abner, which began with issue #70 (May 1949), picking up the numbering from Harvey Publications' Li'l Abner Comics. It ran 28 issues, through #97 (Jan. 1955) Toby's second title was the three-issue Al Capp's Dogpatch Comics, numbered #71, followed by #2–3 (June–Dec. 1949). These issues reprint Li'l Abner strips that the newspaper syndicate United Feature had published in the omnibus comic-book Tip Top #112–114 (Nov. 1946 – Jan. 1947). Following through 1952 were Al Capp's Shmoo Comics #1–5 (July 1949 – April 1950); Al Capp's Wolf Gal #1–2 (1951–1952); and a series of pocket-sized, 6.75 × 3.5-inch, one-shot comics produced as premiums for Oxydol and Dreft detergents: Al Capp's Shmoo in Washable Jones' Travels; Al Capp's Daisy Mae in Ham Sangwidges also Cousin Weakeyes, and Al Capp's Li'l Abner in The Mystery o' the Cave!!

Toby's next series was John Wayne Adventure Comics, named after the actor and frequently featuring photo covers bearing scenes from his movies. It ran 31 issues (Winter 1949/1950–May 1955) and spawned its own Oxydol/Dreft pocket-sized premium, John Wayne: The Cowboy Trouble-Shooter! Further such premiums included Archie in Mask Me No Questions, featuring the Archie Comics teen-humor star; and Paul Terry's Terry-Toon Comics (both 1950).

In its brief existence, Toby Press published in a wide variety of genres, including funny animals, with the 42-issue Felix the Cat (1951–June 1955, taking over the numbering from the Dell Comics series), which spawned spin-offs including Felix the Cat 3D Comic Book (1953); Western, with the likes of Gabby Hayes Western, a one-shot starring the movie sidekick, and the 29-issue Billy the Kid Adventure Magazine; war comics such as the 15-issue Tell It to the Marines and the six-issue Monty Hall of the U.S. Marines (no relation to the game-show host); the genre-evident Great Lover Romances and Tales of Horror; the medieval-adventure one-shot The Black Knight, with art by Ernie Schroeder; and even a two-issue comic Captain Tootsie, that starred the heroic mascot of Tootsie Roll candy.

Toby went out of business in 1955, a victim of the anti-comics sentiment stirred in that era by Dr. Fredric Wertham's book Seduction of the Innocent and the United States Senate Subcommittee on Juvenile Delinquency. Toby's final comic, Felix the Cat #61, was cover-dated June 1955.

=== Minoan ===
Under the imprint Minoan, which featured a Minotaur head as the company logo, Toby Press published Dr. Anthony King, Hollywood Love Doctor, a four-issue romance comic; the seven-issue Western series Return of the Outlaw; and the 13-issue Tales of Horror. Minoan also published Bust Out Laffin', a digest-sized, single-panel cartoon.

== Titles published ==
=== Toby Press ===
- A-Laff-A-Minnit #1-2 (1953?-1954?) / A-Laugh-A-Minnit #3-14 (1954?-1956). Issues #15-16 under Minoan.
- Al Capp's Dogpatch Comics, issue #71 (June 1949), followed by #2–3 (Aug. & Dec. 1949) Comic-strip reprints. One source gives a fourth issue, contents unknown.
- Al Capp's Li'l Abner, issues #70–97 (May 1949 – Jan. 1955) Comic-strip reprints. Numbering continued from Harvey Publications' Li'l Abner Comics.
- Al Capp's Li'l Abner Joins the Navy #1 (1951)
- Al Capp's Shmoo Comics #1–5 (July 1949 – April 1950)
- Al Capp's Wolf Gal #1–2 (1951–1952)
- Barney Google and Snuffy Smith #1-4 (June 1951 - Feb. 1952)
- Belly Laffs #1-6 (1955 - 1956)
- Big Tex #1 (June 1953)
- The Big Top Comics #1-2 (1951)
- Billy the Kid Adventure Magazine #1-29 (Oct. 1950 – [June] 1955)
- The Black Knight one-shot (May 1953)
- Buck Rogers #100-101, 9 (Jan., May & June 1951) Comic-strip reprints.
- Bust Out Laffin' #1-15 (1954 - 1955)
- Captain Tootsie, #1-2 (Oct.–Dec. 1950)
- Danger Is Our Business! #1-3 (Dec.] 1953 - April 1954)
- Dick Wingate of the United States Navy #1 (Jan. 1951)
- Dogpatch Styles Presents Li'l Abner (1949? giveaway)
- Felix the Cat #20–61 (May 1951 – June 1955) Numbering from the Dell Comics series. Also a 1953 summer annual and a 1954 winter annual.
- Felix the Cat 3D Comic Book (1953)
- Felix the Cat and His Friends #1-3 (Dec. 1953 - July 1954)
- Fighting Leathernecks #1-6 (Feb.-Dec. 1952)
- Gabby Hayes Western #1 (Dec. 1953)
- Great Lover Romances (March 1951 – May 1955); issues #3-4 titled Young Lover Romances
- He-Man #1-2 (May–July 1954)
- John Wayne Adventure Comics #1-31 (Winter 1949/1950 – May 1955)
- Johnny Danger Private Detective #1 (Aug. 1954)
- Jon Juan #1 (Spring 1950)
- Judy Joins the Waves #1 (1951)
- Kokey Koala #1 (May 1952)
- Mammy Yokum and the Great Dogpatch Mystery (1956 giveaway)
- Meet Merton #1-4 (Dec. 1953 - June 1954)
- Monty Hall of the U.S. Marines #1-11 (Aug. 1951 - April 1953)
- Pin-Up Pete #1 (1952)
- Ramar of the Jungle #1 (1954)
- Return of the Outlaw #107 (Feb. 1953 - 1955)
- Sands of the South Pacific #1 (Jan. 1953)
- Sorority Secrets #1 (July 1954)
- Super Brat #1-4 (Jan.-July 1954)
- T.N.T. #1-10 (1954 - 1956)
- Tales of Horror #10-13 (April- Oct. 1954). Issues #1-9 under Minoan.
- Tales of Terror #1 (1952)
- Tell It to the Marines #1-15 (March 1952 - July 1955)
- True Movie and Television #1-4 (Aug. 1950 - March 1951)
- Two-Bit the Wacky Woodpecker #1-3 (1951 - May 1953)
- Washable Jones and Schmoo #1 (June 1953)
- With the Marines on the Battlefronts of the World #1-2 (1953 - March 1954)
- Yo' Bets Yo' Life! (1955 giveaway)
- Oxydol and Dreft premium one-shot digest titles (1950):
  - Al Capp's Daisy Mae in Ham Sangwidges also Cousin Weakeyes
  - Al Capp's Li'l Abner in The Mystery o' the Cave!!
  - Al Capp's Shmoo in Washable Jones' Travels
  - Archie in Mask Me No Questions
  - John Wayne: The Cowboy Trouble-Shooter!
  - Paul Terry's Terry-Toon Comics

=== Minoan Publishing ===
Sources:

- A-Laugh-A-Minnit #15-16 (1956). Issues #1-4 under Toby, above.
- Dr. Anthony King, Hollywood Love Doctor, #1-4 ([Jan.] 1952 – May 1954)
- The Purple Claw #1-3 (Jan.-May 1953)
- Tales of Horror #1-9 (June 1952 - Feb. 1954) Issues #10-12 under Toby, above.
- Wise Cracks #1-12 (1955 - 1956)
