= Elliot Caplin =

American comics writer (1913–2000)

- Born: December 25, 1913 New Haven, Connecticut, U.S.
- Died: February 20, 2000 (aged 86) Stockbridge, Massachusetts, U.S.
- Area: Writer
- Notable works: The Heart of Juliet Jones; Big Ben Bolt
- Spouse: Ruth
- Children: 3

Elliot Caplin (December 25, 1913 – February 20, 2000) was an American comic strip writer best known as the co-creator (with Stan Drake) of The Heart of Juliet Jones. His name is sometimes spelled with an extra letter: Elliott A. Caplin. He was the younger brother of Al Capp, creator of Li'l Abner.

== Biography ==
Born in New Haven, Connecticut, Caplin graduated from Ohio State University in 1936. In 1937, he began as a writer for King Features Syndicate. He entered the comic book field as editor of True Comics for the Parents Magazine Institute. By 1940, he was the editorial director of magazine Parents, leaving during World War II to serve with the Navy in the South Pacific. In the post-World War II years, he returned to Parents, continuing as an editor there until 1948.

Caplin co-created the strips Dr. Bobbs, Peter Scratch, and Big Ben Bolt, and served as a writer for strips by others, including Abbie an' Slats, Long Sam, and Little Orphan Annie. He adapted author Donald J. Sobol's Encyclopedia Brown series into a comic strip.

Caplin conceived of the original idea for the comic strip Broom-Hilda. He described the main character to cartoonist Russell Myers, who responded with a sketch of the witch and several samples. Caplin, acting as Myers' business manager, submitted these to the Chicago Tribune Syndicate. Introduced on April 19, 1970, it became an immediate success, and was reprinted in several collections during the 1970s and 1980s.

Caplin also founded the comic book publisher Toby Press, which operated from 1949 to 1955.

=== Theater ===
In the early 1970s, Caplin wrote Meegan's Game, a play about arrested adolescence. Directed by Paul E. Davis, it had a 1974 workshop production for several weekends at the Cricket Theatre on Second Avenue in an effort to interest potential backers. The play was eventually produced in 1982. Among his many other plays are A Nickel for Picasso, a fictionalized account of his brother losing his leg. He also wrote a book about his brother, Al Capp Remembered.

== Personal life and death ==
Caplin lived in Larchmont, New York, with his wife Ruth and their three children, Donald, Joan, and Toby. He died in Stockbridge, Massachusetts, in 2000.
