= Comic strip formats =

Various layouts for comic strips

Comic strip formats vary widely from publication to publication, so that the same newspaper comic strip may appear in a half-dozen different formats with different numbers of panels, different sizes of panels and different arrangement of panels.

== Daily strip ==
The first distinction in comic strips formats is between the daily comic strip and the Sunday strip. A daily strip is usually carried on a standard newspaper page, often alongside other strips and non-comics matter (such as crossword puzzles). It is usually printed as either a horizontal strip (longer than it is tall) or a box (roughly square) in black and white, although in recent years syndicates have offered daily strips in color, and newspapers with the ability to print it as such have done so.

== Sunday strip ==
There is a much greater variety in Sunday strip formats. Sunday strips are usually in color, published in a special newspaper section, the Sunday comics section. Comics sections usually come in one of two sizes, full page or tabloid. A few newspapers ran their comics in a comic-book size section from the mid-to-late 1970s to the mid-1980s (billed as "collectable comics"), and some strips have appeared in the Sunday magazine of newspapers, such as the 1990 Dick Tracy reprints in the Daily News Magazine of the New York Daily News.

=== Variation ===
A single comic strip may appear in numerous variations; there is a "full" version, to appear at a given size, which may have parts eliminated, be shrunk, or have the panels cut up and re-arranged.

Expendable parts may include a topper (a small separate comic strip, no longer used in mainstream comics), "throwaway" panels (a short throw-away gag, still common), or a large title panel or tier. Due to the desire to re-arrange, comics may use a conventional layout of the panels (as demonstrated below) to allow them to be cut up and displayed on a varied number of tiers.

== Full page ==

Full page is a format roughly 20 inches high and 14 inches wide. The Reading Eagle Sunday comics section is full-page size, though today no individual strips are still printed to take up a full page. When Sunday strips first appeared in newspapers, near the beginning of the 20th century, they were usually in the full-page size. Leading full-page Sundays included Thimble Theater, Little Orphan Annie, Dick Tracy and Bringing Up Father. Many full-page comic strips had a topper, a small strip that ran above or occasionally below the main strip, usually by the same artist. The topper on Thimble Theater was Sappo, the topper on Little Orphan Annie was Maw Green and ran at the bottom of the full page. Dick Tracy never had a topper while it was still a full page, but much later it had a topper, Sawdust, which ran at the bottom of the tabloid page.

In the 1940s, comic strips were reduced in size because newspapers wanted to fit more comics per page. Paper rationing during World War II also contributed to this, but was not the primary cause. Many strips were reduced in size to half of a page or one-third of a page. Collectors call these formats "halves" and "thirds". Only a few strips, notably Prince Valiant, were still published in full-page format after World War II. In the mid-1950s, there were a few attempts to revive the full-page Sunday comic strip, notably Lance and Johnny Reb and Billy Yank. These were not a commercial success and were reduced to half-page format after a short full-page run. The last full-page Sunday strip was Prince Valiant, which continued in full-page format in some newspapers until 1970. New Prince Valiant stories still appear in newspapers today, but in half-page or smaller formats.

Only a few books have been published reprinting full-page Sunday strips in their original size: The Golden Age of Tarzan, Prince Valiant: An American Epic and Little Nemo.

=== Two-thirds ===
A derivative of the full-page format, the 12-panel two-thirds format was used exclusively by the King Features Syndicate in some of its strips (e.g.: Popeye) after World War II; the format was essentially a full without its "topper". The format was short-lived, as by the late 1959s these strips were mostly published as thirds. However, they would be designed in a 12-panel format until the mid-1980s, as it was near impossible to run them as either halves or quarters.

== Half page ==

Half page is a Sunday strip format that is roughly 10 inches high and 14 inches wide. Today, it is the largest and most complete format for most Sunday strips, including Peanuts, Prince Valiant, and Doonesbury. The half-page Sunday strip was introduced in the 1920s to fit two Sunday strips on a single page. The Phantom, Mandrake the Magician and Terry and the Pirates were introduced in this format. Other strips, such as Flash Gordon and Blondie had panels rearranged, cropped or removed to make the full page fit in a smaller size. In the 1940s, most newspapers wanted more comics per page, so they often reduced the size. Beginning about this time, the half page became the standard size, and the third-of-a-page strip was introduced, fitting three strips on each page, one above another. A half page typically had three tiers; the third page either reduced, rearranged and cropped these panels, as seen in Li'l Abner strips, or more commonly, just dropped the top tier, as was the case with Peanuts. Today, only the Reading Eagle and a few other newspapers run any of their Sunday strips in the complete half-page format. The Sunday Calvin and Hobbes comic strip was so popular that the artist insisted that it fill half of a page, although many editors ran a shrunken version of the same strip. The only other strip that also required the half-page format, though not necessarily the half-page size, was Opus; both it and Calvin and Hobbes have since ended.

== Third ==
Third is used by comic strip collectors and dealers to describe one of the formats in which Sunday strips appear in American newspapers. One page of a full-color comics section can be divided horizontally into two, three or four parts. Comic strip collectors call strips that occupy one-third of a full page "thirds". From the mid-1940s until at least the 1980s, "thirds" were the most common comic strip format, and "thirds" are still common today. "Thirds" usually drop several panels, and these incomplete strips are not sought after by collectors as much as half-page or full-page strips.

A few comic strips were designed to be run as "thirds", such as Steve Canyon, the early Garfield and On Stage (except for the last few years of its run). These strips are complete in the third of a page format, and they are cropped and rearranged in the half-page, tab or full-page format. Other strips, such as The Amazing Spider-Man and the current Alley Oop are drawn in the third-of-a-page format and the half page is created by adding a title tier, which is either the same every week (in the case of Alley Oop), or comes in a small number of different varieties (in the case of Spider-Man and other strips based on Marvel Comics characters).

== Quarter ==
Quarter is used by comic strip collectors and dealers to describe the format in which a full page is divided horizontally into four equal parts. Quarter pages are small, but often have all of the panels of a half-page, rearranged into two tiers instead of three. Some quarters drop one panel, some add a title panel to the left of the two tiers. Some newspapers place five or six quarters into a single page.

== Other formats ==
As newspapers print fewer and fewer pages in the Sunday comics section and continue reducing broadsheet size, a variety of other formats have been introduced over the years, including formats that divide the page into vertical and horizontal sections. To fit the format of the weekly Grit, Little Annie Rooney and other Sunday strips were given extreme vertical rearrangements, which have grown very common in recent years (example: the Sunday strip for Non Sequitur is now available only in a vertical near-page-long format).

== Tab ==
A tab or tabloid comic strip is a strip published on a full page of a tabloid-size newspaper. Most cities without subways have newspapers that are roughly 20 inches high and 14 inches wide, while cities with subways usually have smaller newspapers, roughly 14 inches high and 10 inches wide, making them easier to read on crowded public transit conveyances. The smaller format is called "tabloid". In New York City, for example, The New York Times is a full- size newspaper while the New York Post is a tabloid. Many collectors of newspaper comic strips prefer the tabloid or "tab" size Sunday strip for such strips as Little Orphan Annie, Dick Tracy and Terry and the Pirates.

== Half tab ==
Half tab is a comic strip format that fills half of a page in a tabloid newspaper Sunday comics section. Usually, though not always, it is the same as the half-page format, only smaller. As modern newspapers cram more and more strips onto one Sunday page, even full-sized newspapers often use the half-tab (and even the third-tab) format. More and more tabloid newspapers put three or more reduced thirds on a single tabloid page.

== See also ==
- List of newspaper comic strips
