= Casey Ruggles =

American comic strip by Warren Tufts

Warren Tufts' Casey Ruggles (February 26, 1950)

Casey Ruggles is a Western comic strip written and drawn by Warren Tufts that ran from May 22, 1949, to October 30, 1955.

== Publication history ==
The Sunday strip was launched May 22, 1949, and the daily strip on September 19, 1949. Until 1950, the Sunday strip and the daily strip both told the same story.

Tufts' ghost artists and assistants were Al Plastino, Edmond Good, Alex Toth and Ruben Moreira. Tufts did not write or draw the Sunday strip between August 31, 1953, and January 30, 1954. The last Tufts' daily was April 3, 1954, and his last Sunday was on September 5, 1954.

The strip continued for a short while with Al Carreño as artist and writer.

== Characters and story ==
Casey Ruggles was an Old West adventurer in the California Gold Rush (1848–1855) . A former sergeant in the U.S. Army, he encountered such historical figures as Kit Carson, William G. Fargo, Millard Fillmore, Jean Lafitte, and Henry Wells.

== Episode guide ==
- daily and Sunday
  - The Trek to California
- daily 1950
  - Black Barney
  - The Hard Times of Pancho and Pecos
  - Aquila
  - The Spanish Mine
  - The Whisperer
  - The Pomo Uprising

Warren Tufts' Casey Ruggles (May 15, 1951)

- daily 1951
  - Old Ancient
  - In Old Los Angeles
  - King of the Horsemen
  - Juan Soto
  - Jenny
- daily 1952
  - Sidney Town
  - Death Valley Gold
  - The Growlersburgh Church
  - The Babysitter
  - Smiley Sweet
  - Miss Hawks
- daily 1953
  - A Real Nice Guy
  - The Marchioness of Grofnek
  - The Highwayman
  - Leaves of Strength
  - The Spanish Pearl Galleon
  - Santy Claus
- daily 1954
  - The Willits Family
  - Penelope's Gold

- Sunday stories
- 1950
  - The Emperor of Tilly Valley
  - Murietta
- 1951
  - Silver Belle
  - The Return of Black Barney
  - Captain Beauregarde
  - The Fairy Godmother
- 1952
  - Apache Convention
  - The Trial of Kit Fox
  - Wedding Bells
  - River Steamboat War
- 1953
  - Yagali
  - A Man of Peace
- 1954
  - The California Express Co.
  - Spanish Doubloons

== Reprints ==
All of the daily stories by Warren Tufts have been reprinted by Pacific Comics Club or Comics Revue. Comics Revue has also reprinted all of the Sunday's by Warren Tufts through 7 JUNE 1953. The early dailies and Sundays have been reprinted in hardback by Classic Comics Press; two more volumes are planned.
