= Cullen Murphy =

American writer, journalist and editor (born 1952)

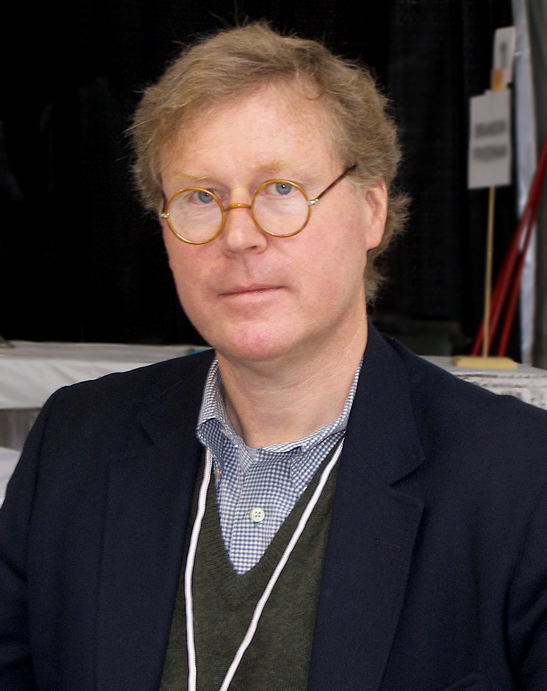
- Murphy in 2007
- Born: John Cullen Murphy Jr. September 1, 1952 (age 74); New Rochelle, New York, U.S.
- Education: Amherst College
- Occupations: Writer; journalist; editor
- Parent(s): John Cullen Murphy; Joan Byrne

John Cullen Murphy, Jr. (born September 1, 1952) is an American writer, journalist and editor who was managing editor of The Atlantic magazine from 1985 to 2006.

== Early life and education ==
He was born in New Rochelle, New York, in 1952, a son of illustrator and cartoonist John Cullen Murphy. He grew up in Greenwich, Connecticut. His family moved to Dublin, Ireland for several years, including 1966, the 50th anniversary of the Easter Revolution.

Murphy graduated from Amherst College cum laude with a degree in European studies in 1974. Murphy's first magazine job was in the paste-up department of Change, a magazine devoted to higher education.

== Career ==
He became an editor of The Wilson Quarterly in 1977. From the mid-1970s until 2004 he worked with his father, John Cullen Murphy, as writer for the comic strip Prince Valiant, for which his father produced the artwork. He became the editor of The Atlantic in the mid-1970s and edited it for more than twenty years. He is also the author of The Word According to Eve: Women and the Bible in Ancient Times and Our Own (1999); Are We Rome? (2007), which compares the politics and culture of Ancient Rome with that of the contemporary United States; God's Jury: The Inquisition and the Making of the Modern World (2012); and Cartoon County: My Father and His Friends in the Golden Age of Make-Believe (2017), a history of the cartoonists and illustrators from the Connecticut School. He currently serves as editor at large for Vanity Fair and is on the advisory board of the literary magazine The Common, based at Amherst College. He previously chaired Amherst's Board of Trustees.

== Personal life ==
Murphy lives in Massachusetts with his wife, Anna Marie Torres Murphy. He has three children, Jack, Anna, and Tim.

== Bibliography ==
- Rathje, William & Cullen Murphy (1992). Rubbish! The archaeology of garbage. New York: HarperCollins.
- Murphy, Cullen (1995). Just curious : essays. Boston: Houghton Mifflin.
- — (1998). The Word according to Eve : women and the Bible in ancient times and our own. Boston: Houghton Mifflin Harcourt.
- — (2012). God's jury : the Inquisition and the making of the modern world. London: Allen Lane.
- — (August 1996). "Eminent domains : a horticulturalist and the landscape at Monticello that he has brought back to life". Brief Lives. The Atlantic Monthly. 278 (2): 28–31.
- — (September 1996). "The E word". Notes & Comment. The Atlantic Monthly. 278 (3): 16, 18.
- — (2007). Are we Rome? The fall of an empire and the fate of America. Boston: Houghton Mifflin.
- Carter, Graydon & Cullen Murphy (2011). Anderson & Sheppard : a style is born. Trafalgar Square.
- Murphy, Cullen (2017). Cartoon county : my father and his friends in the golden age of make-believe. New York: Farrar, Straus and Giroux.
- —, ed. (2020). The American crisis : what went wrong, how we recover. New York: Simon & Schuster.
- Gendel, Milton (2022). Cullen Murphy (ed.). Just passing through : a seven-decade Roman holiday : the diaries and photographs of Milton Gendel. New York: Farrar, Straus and Giroux.
- Murphy, Cullen (June 2023). "Night at the Vatican". The Atlantic. 331 (5): 56–69. (Note: Online version is titled "My night in the Sistine Chapel".)

———————

Bibliography notes
