= Hal Foster =

Canadian-American illustrator (1892–1982)

Hal Foster FRSA
- Foster at his drawing board in 1962
- Born: Harold Rudolf Foster; August 16, 1892 Halifax, Nova Scotia, Canada
- Died: July 25, 1982 (aged 89) Hernando, Florida, U.S.
- Areas: Writer, Artist
- Notable works: Prince Valiant, Tarzan
- Awards: Inkpot Award (1977)

Harold Rudolf Foster (August 16, 1892 – July 25, 1982) was a Canadian-American comic strip artist and writer best known as the creator of the comic strip Prince Valiant. His drawing style is noted for its high level of draftsmanship and attention to detail.

Born in Halifax, Nova Scotia, Canada, Foster moved to the United States in 1921, and began his illustration career in Chicago, eventually becoming an American citizen. In 1928, he began one of the earliest adventure comic strips, an adaptation of Edgar Rice Burroughs's Tarzan. In 1937, he created his signature strip, the weekly Prince Valiant, a fantasy adventure set in the Middle Ages. The strip featured Foster's dexterous, detailed artwork; Foster eschewed word balloons, preferring to have narration and dialogue in captions.

== Early life ==
Born in Halifax, Nova Scotia, Foster was a staff artist for Stovel, Commercial Art Co., W.M. Buckley Studio, and Brigdens Limited in Winnipeg. In 1919, Foster rode his bicycle to Chicago to see what the job market was like. He later moved there in 1921, and began working for the Jahn & Ollier Engraving Co. Foster freely "audited" classes at the Chicago Academy of Fine Arts, a practice commonly made back then by poor students, which is confirmed by the fact that the Art Institute has no record of him taking formal classes. The illustrator J. C. Leyendecker was an early influence on Foster.

In 1925, Foster began working for the Chicago advertising studio Palenske-Young, Inc., and his clients were: Union Pacific Railroad, Johnson Outboard Motors, Wurlitzer Grand Pianos, Jelke Margarine, and the International Truck Company. In 1928, Palenske-Young was hired by Joseph Henry “Joe” Neebe, owner of Famous Books and Plays, to adapt the novel Tarzan by Edgar Rice Burroughs into a 10-week comic strip series. Foster was selected to illustrate the adaptation, which first appeared in the British weekly magazine Tit-Bits on October 20, 1928. The series was later published in the United States, beginning on January 7, 1929. Foster returned to do the Tarzan Sunday strip beginning September 27, 1931, continuing until Burne Hogarth took over the Sunday Tarzan on May 9, 1937.

== Prince Valiant ==
William Randolph Hearst, who had long wanted Foster to do a comic strip for his newspapers, was so impressed with Foster's pitch for Prince Valiant that he promised Foster a 50-50 split of the gross income on the strip, a very rare offer in those days. Prince Valiant premiered on February 13, 1937. It still continues today by other creators since the 1970s. In 1944, Foster and his wife Helen moved from Evanston, Illinois to Redding Ridge, Connecticut. In 1954, the couple was seen on television's This Is Your Life. In 1971, the Fosters retired to Spring Hill, Florida. In 1967, Woody Gelman revived some of Foster's earlier work for his Nostalgia Press.

== Retirement and death ==
In 1970, Foster was suffering from arthritis and began planning his retirement. He had several artists draw Sunday pages before choosing John Cullen Murphy as his collaborator and permanent replacement in 1971. Murphy drew the strip from Foster scripts and pencil sketches. Foster stopped illustrating (and signing) the Prince Valiant pages in 1971 – with the exception being Page #2000, on June 8, 1975, that featured reprinted vignettes of previous panels along with his signature. For nine years, Foster continued writing the strip and making fairly detailed 8.5-inch (220 mm) x 11-inch (280 mm) penciled layouts for Murphy, until he sold the strip to King Features Syndicate in 1979. Prolonged anesthesia during a hip replacement surgery in November 1979 took his memory, and he no longer remembered ever doing Tarzan or Prince Valiant.

Foster attended the Comic Art Convention in 1969, and the OrlandoCon in 1974 and 1975.

Foster was 73 when he was elected to membership in UK's Royal Society of Arts, an honor given to very few Americans.

Foster died at a care facility in Hernando, Florida, in 1982, a month before his 90th birthday.

== Influence and legacy ==
Foster is a seminal figure in the history of comics, especially action-adventure strips. R.C. Harvey argues that Foster and Flash Gordon artist Alex Raymond "created the visual standard by which all such comic strips would henceforth be measured."

Foster's clear yet detailed panels, uncluttered by word balloons, were appreciated by contemporaries of his generation such as Lynd Ward, but perhaps his greatest impact was on the young artists who drove the Golden Age of Comics. Foster was a major influence on this generation, many of whom went on to become iconic and influential artists themselves. Joe Kubert called Foster, Raymond and Milton Caniff the "three saints" of comic art in the 1930s and 1940s. Several sources have identified early work by Joe Simon, Jack Kirby and Bob Kane as swipes from Foster, and Kirby claimed that he "cannibalized" Foster's style, among others. Kirby also stated that the character design for Etrigan the Demon was an homage to Foster, taken from a Prince Valiant strip. Wally Wood was "obsessed" with Foster's work, and began copying his newspaper strips at the age of two. Frank Frazetta called Foster's work on Tarzan "perfection, a landmark in American twentieth-century art that will never be surpassed." Among the many other artists who have cited Foster as an important influence are Carl Barks, Steve Ditko, Mark Schultz, William Stout, Bill Ward, and Al Williamson. Williamson, who met Foster on a few occasions, described him as "a very stern gentleman, very stern, no nonsense. You could never call him Hal or Harold, it's Mr. Foster. ... you don't see that kind of people anymore, the ones that really command your respect."

== Awards ==
Foster won The Silver Lady Award (The Artists and Writers Association, 1952); the Gold Medal Award (Parent’s Magazine, 1954); the Golden Lion Award (Burroughs Bibliophiles, 1967); the Alley Award (Academy of Comic Book Arts and Sciences, 1967, 1968 & 1969); the Adamson Award (Swedish Academy of Comic Art, 1969); the Ignatz Award (OrlandoCon, 1974); the Inkpot Award (San Diego Comic-Con, 1977); and the Sondermann Award (Frankfurt Book Fair, 2008). Foster was also recognized for his work by the National Cartoonists Society with the Reuben Award in 1957, Silver T-Square Award (1975), Gold Key Award (1977), Elzie Segar Award (1978), Best Story Strip plaque (1964, 1971, 1974, 1976 & 1978), and Special Feature plaque (1966 & 1967), all for Prince Valiant. A rare honor came in 1965, when Foster was made a Fellow of the Royal Society of Arts (FRSA) in London, a first for any American cartoonist. More than any other cartoonist or illustrator, Foster is in five artistic Halls of Fame: The National Cartoonists Society Hall of Fame (1977), The Museum of Cartoon Art Hall of Fame (1977), The Will Eisner Award Hall of Fame (1996), and the Joe Shuster Canadian Comic Book Creators Hall of Fame (First Annual, 2005, accepted on behalf of the family by writer-artist Dave Sim, a longtime admirer of Foster's work.), and the Society of Illustrators' Hall of Fame (2006).

== Sources ==
- Blackbeard, Bill. "Artist of the Absurd", Tarzan in Color. Vol. 1. 1931–1932 New York: Flying Buttress Classics Library. ISBN 1-56163-049-7
- Kane, Brian M (2001), Hal Foster: Prince of Illustrators, Vanguard Productions, ISBN 1-887591-25-7
- Kane, Brian M (2009), The Definitive Prince Valiant Companion, Fantagraphics Books, ISBN 978-1-60699-305-7
