= Sunday comics =

Newspaper comic-strip format

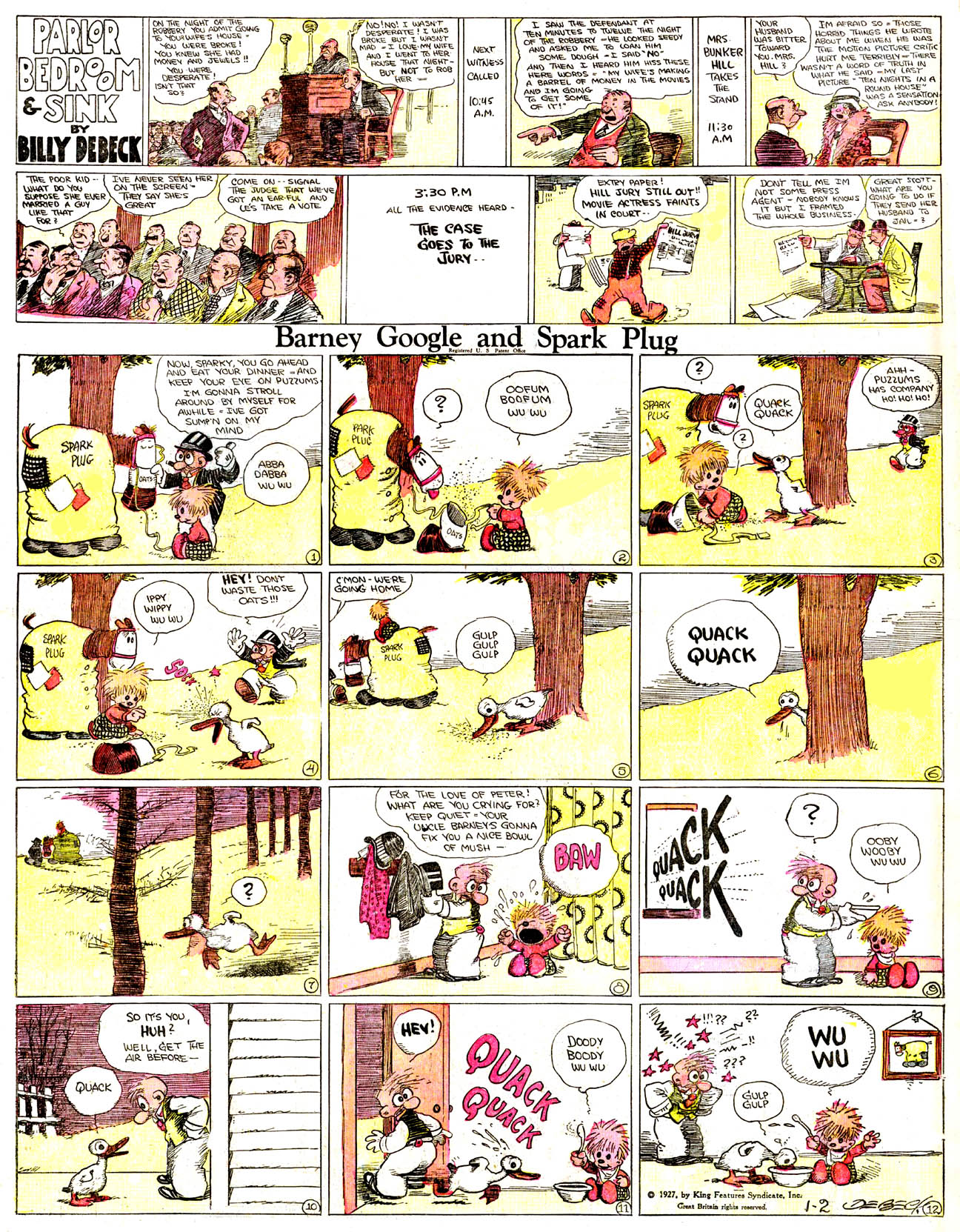
An example of a classic full-page Sunday humor strip, Billy DeBeck's Barney Google and Spark Plug (January 2, 1927), showing how an accompanying topper strip was displayed on a Sunday page.

The Sunday comics or Sunday strip is the comic strip section carried in some Western newspapers. Compared to weekday comics, Sunday comics tend to be full pages and are in color. Many newspaper readers called this section the Sunday funnies, the funny papers or simply the funnies.

The first US newspaper comic strips appeared in the late 19th century, closely allied with the invention of the color press. Jimmy Swinnerton's The Little Bears introduced sequential art and recurring characters in William Randolph Hearst's San Francisco Examiner. In the United States, the popularity of color comic strips sprang from the newspaper war between Hearst and Joseph Pulitzer. Some newspapers, such as Grit, published Sunday strips in black-and-white, and some (mostly in Canada) print their Sunday strips on Saturday.

Subject matter and genres have ranged from adventure, detective and humor strips to dramatic strips with soap opera situations, such as Mary Worth. A continuity strip employs a narrative in an ongoing storyline. Other strips offer a gag complete in a single episode, such as Little Iodine and Mutt and Jeff. The Sunday strip is contrasted with the daily comic strip, published Monday through Saturday, usually in black and white. Many comic strips appear both daily and Sunday, in some cases, as with Little Orphan Annie, telling the same story daily and Sunday, in other cases, as with The Phantom, telling one story in the daily and a different story in the Sunday. Some strips, such as Prince Valiant appear only on Sunday. Others, such as Rip Kirby, are daily only and have never appeared on Sunday. In some cases, such as Buz Sawyer, the Sunday strip is a spin-off, focusing on different characters than the daily.

== Popular strips ==
An example of an action-adventure strip is The Phantom (May 28, 1939). With Ray Moore art, this was the first Phantom Sunday strip.

Famous American full-page Sunday strips include Alley Oop, Barney Google and Snuffy Smith, Blondie, Bringing Up Father, Buck Rogers, Captain Easy, Flash Gordon, and Thimble Theatre. Such classics have found a new home in book collections of recent years. On the other hand, numerous strips such as Bob Gustafson's Specs and Virgil Partch's The Captain's Gig are almost completely forgotten today, other than a brief display in the Stripper's Guide site run by comics historian Allan Holtz.

Many of the leading cartoonists also drew an accompanying topper strip to run above or below their main strip, a practice which began to fade away during the late 1930s. Holtz notes, "You'll hear historians say that the topper strip was a victim of World War II paper shortages. Don't believe a word of it—it's the ads that killed full-page strips, and that killed the topper. World War II only exacerbated an already bad situation."

Mauricio de Sousa's popular newspaper strips helped him become the most successful comic book artist in Brazil. In 2021, Pipoca e Nanquim released a library collecting his Horácio full-color Sunday comics, originally published in the children's supplement of Folha de S.Paulo between 1963 and 1992.

== Role of the color press ==
After the publisher of the Chicago Inter-Ocean saw the first color press in Paris at the offices of Le Petit Journal, he had his own color press operating late in 1892. At the New York Recorder, manager George Turner had R. Hoe & Co. design a color press, and the Recorder published the first American newspaper color page on April 2, 1893. The following month, Pulitzer's New York World printed cartoonist Walt McDougall's "The Possibilities of the Broadway Cable Car" as a color page on May 21, 1893. In 1894, Pulitzer introduced the Sunday color supplement.

The Yellow Kid is usually credited as one of the first US newspaper comic strips. However, the artform combining words and pictures evolved gradually, and there are many examples of proto-comic strips. In 1995, King Features Syndicate president Joseph F. D'Angelo wrote:

It was in Joseph Pulitzer's New York World that cartoonist Richard Outcault's legendary Yellow Kid made his newspaper debut in 1895, but it was Hearst's New York Journal that cannily snatched the Kid away from the rival sheet and deployed him as a key weapon in the historic newspaper circulation wars. The Kid led the charge in Hearst's trailblazing American Humorist comic supplement, with its famous motto: "Eight Pages of Iridescent Polychromous Effulgence That Makes The Rainbow Look Like A Lead Pipe!" Pulitzer fought back by hiring another artist to draw Outcault's character for the World. The publishers' fierce battle over the bald urchin in the yellow nightshirt led bystanders to refer to sensational, screaming-headline style newspaper combat as "yellow journalism." The popularity of that expression tainted the early comics as a less-than-genteel entertainment, but it also made it clear that the "funnies" had become serious business, seemingly overnight.

In 1905, Winsor McCay's Little Nemo in Slumberland began. Stephen Becker, in Comic Art in America, noted that Little Nemo in Slumberland was "probably the first strip to exploit color for purely aesthetic purposes; it was the first in which the dialogue, occasionally polysyllabic, flirted with adult irony.

By 1906, the weekly Sunday comics supplement was commonplace, with a half-dozen competitive syndicates circulating strips to newspapers in every major American city. In 1923, The Commercial Appeal in Memphis, Tennessee, became among the first in the nation to acquire its own radio station, and it was the first Southern newspaper to publish a Sunday comic section.

For most of the 20th century, the Sunday funnies were a family tradition, enjoyed each weekend by adults and kids alike. They were read by millions and produced famous fictional characters in such strips as Flash Gordon, Little Orphan Annie, Prince Valiant, Dick Tracy and Terry and the Pirates. Leading the lists of classic humor strips are Bringing Up Father, Gasoline Alley, Li'l Abner, Pogo, Peanuts and Smokey Stover. Some newspapers added their own local features, such as Our Own Oddities in the St. Louis Post-Dispatch. There were educational strips, such as King Features' Heroes of American History. In addition to the comic strips, Sunday comics sections also carried advertisements in a comics format, single-panel features, puzzles, paper dolls and cut-and-paste activities. The World Museum gave readers instructions for cutting pictures apart and assembling them into a diorama, often with a subject from nature, such as The Grand Canyon or Buffalo Hunt. A page on covered wagons carried the headline, "Covered wagons shown in an easy-to-build model: Scissors, paste and wrapping paper are all you need to make this Western set."

Some radio stations across the United States featured Sunday morning programs in which an announcer read aloud from the Sunday comics section, allowing readers to follow action in the panels as they listened to the dialogue. Most notably, on July 8, 1945, during a New York newspaper deliverers' strike, New York mayor Fiorello H. La Guardia read comic strips over the radio.

== Sunday strip layout ==
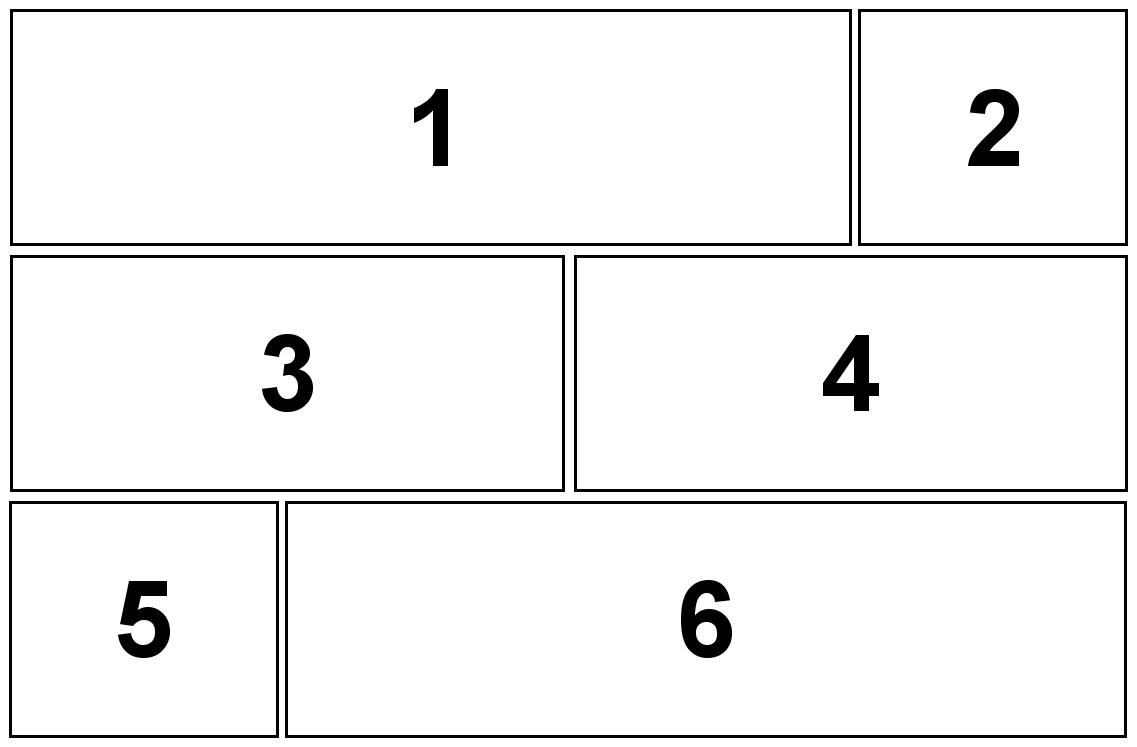
Sunday comic strip panel layout, designed to fill half a newspaper page.

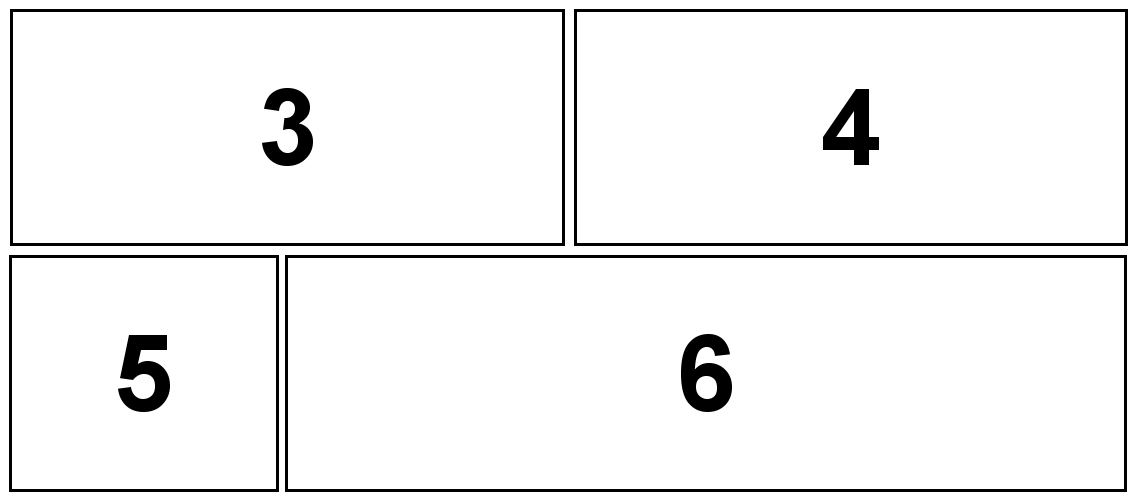
Sunday comic strip panel layout, designed to fill a third of a newspaper page. Note that the top two panels are omitted entirely.

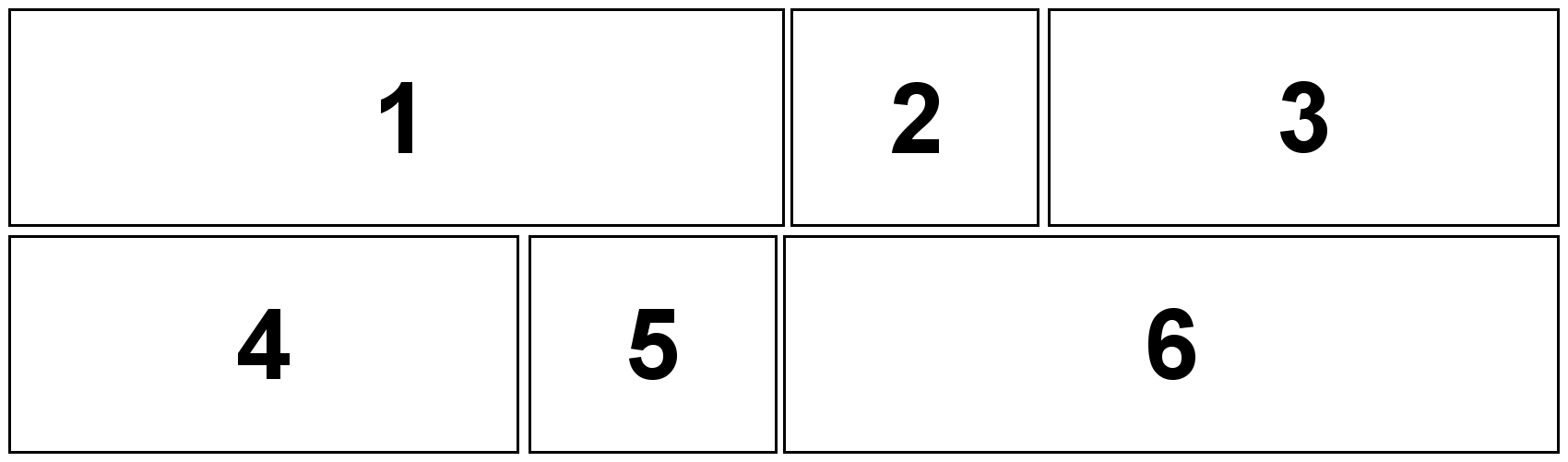
Sunday comic strip panel layout, designed to fill a quarter of a newspaper page.

Early Sunday strips filled an entire newspaper page. Later strips, such as The Phantom and Terry and the Pirates, were usually only half that size, with two strips to a page in full-size newspapers, such as the New Orleans Times Picayune, or with one strip on a tabloid page, as in the Chicago Sun-Times. When Sunday strips began to appear in more than one format, it became necessary for the cartoonist to follow a standardized strip layout, which provides newspapers with the greatest flexibility in determining how to print a strip. One notable distinction among Sunday comics supplements was the supplement produced in a comic book-like format, featuring the character The Spirit. These sixteen-page (later eight-page) standalone Sunday supplements of Will Eisner's character (distributed by the Register and Tribune Syndicate) were included with newspapers from 1940 through 1952. During World War II, because of paper shortages, the size of Sunday strips began to shrink. After the war, strips continued to get smaller and smaller, to save the expense of printing so many color pages. The last full-page comic strip was the Prince Valiant strip for 11 April 1971. The dimensions of the Sunday comics continued to decrease in recent years, as did the number of pages. Sunday comics sections that were 10 or 12 pages in 1950 dropped to six or four pages by 2005. One of the last large-size Sunday comics in the United States is in the Reading Eagle, which has eight Berliner-size pages and carries 36 comics. Its banner headline is "Biggest Comics Section in the Land". Another big-size comic section is that of The Washington Post which carries 41 strips in eight broadsheet pages although it also contains a sudoku and a Jumble puzzle. Canadian newspaper comic sections are unique not only because of being printed on Saturdays, but these usually are also part of the entertainment or lifestyle section. A notable exception is that of the Winnipeg Free Press which publishes an eight-page comic-only tabloid section.

=== Early strips ===
Early Sunday strips usually filled a full newspaper page, but over decades they shrank in size, becoming smaller and smaller. Currently, no Sunday strips stand alone on a page, and some newspapers crowd as many as eight Sunday strips on a single page. The last full-page Sunday strip was Prince Valiant, which was published as a full page in some newspapers until 1971. Shortly after the full-page Prince Valiant was discontinued, Hal Foster retired from drawing the strip, though he continued to write it for several more years. Manuscript Press published a print of his last Prince Valiant strip in full-page format; this was the last full-page comic strip, though it did not appear in that format in newspapers.

=== Revivals ===
During the 1950s, there were a few short-lived attempts to revive the full-page Sunday strip. Examples such as Lance by Warren Tufts and Frank Giacoia's Johnny Reb and Billy Yank proved artistic, though not commercial, successes.

=== Other formats ===
Other formats for Sunday strips include the half-page, the third of a page, the quarter page, the tabloid page or tab, and the half tab, short for half of a tabloid page. Today, with the ever-shrinking size of Sunday strips, many other smaller formats abound.

Usually, only the largest format is complete, with the other formats dropping or cropping one or more panels. Such "throwaway" panels often contain material that is not vital to the main part of the strip. Most cartoonists fill the first two panels of their strips with a "throwaway gag," knowing that the public may not see them, and making them integral to the plot would likely be wasteful. Exceptions to this rule include Steve Canyon and, until its last few years, On Stage, which are complete only in the third format. An alternative is to have a separate strip, a "topper" (though it may appear at the bottom), so with the topper it comprises a three-tier half-page, and without it comprises a two-tier third-page.

Half-page Sunday strips have at least two different styles. The King Features, the Creators' and the Chicago Tribune syndicates use nine panels (with only one used for the title), while United Features and Universal Press' half-page Sunday strips (most of them use a third-page format instead) use two panels for the title (except for Jim Davis' U.S. Acres—which used the nine-panel format- during the 1980s, when most UFS strips -particularly Davis' more successful Garfield—would have a throwaway gag).

Currently, the largest and most complete format for most Sunday strips, such as Peanuts, is the half page. A few strips have been popular enough for the artist to insist on the Sunday strip being run in a half-page format, though not necessarily in a half-page size. Calvin and Hobbes was the first strip to do this, followed by Outland and later Opus. The Reading Eagle is one of the few newspapers that still run half-page Sunday strips. Today, Slylock Fox & Comics for Kids is a popular example of a three tier half-page standard Sunday strip.

In some cases today, the daily strip and Sunday strip dimensions are almost the same. For instance, a daily strip in The Arizona Republic measures 4 3/4" wide by 1 1/2" deep, while the three-tiered Hägar the Horrible Sunday strip in the same paper is 5" wide by 3 3/8" deep.

== See also ==
- Comics
- Daily comic strip
- Graphic novels
- List of comic strip syndicates
- List of newspaper comic strips
