= Prince Valiant =

1937 comic strip by Hal Foster

- Authors: Hal Foster; John Cullen Murphy; Cullen Murphy; Mairead Murphy; Gray Morrow; Wally Wood; Gary Gianni; Mark Schultz; Thomas Yeates
- Current status/schedule: Running/weekly
- Launch date: February 13, 1937
- Syndicate: King Features Syndicate
- Genre: Epic historical adventure

Prince Valiant in the Days of King Arthur, often simply called Prince Valiant, is an American comic strip created by Hal Foster in 1937. It is an epic adventure that has told a continuous story during its entire history, and the full stretch of that story now totals more than 4600 Sunday strips. The strip appears weekly in more than 300 American newspapers, according to its distributor, King Features Syndicate.

Edward, the Duke of Windsor called Prince Valiant the "greatest contribution to English literature in the past hundred years". Generally regarded by comics historians as one of the most impressive visual creations ever syndicated, the strip is noted for its realistically rendered panoramas and the intelligent, sometimes humorous, narrative. The format does not employ word balloons. Instead, the story is narrated in captions positioned at the bottom or sides of panels. Events depicted are taken from various periods from the late Roman Empire to the High Middle Ages, with a few brief scenes from modern times (commenting on the "manuscript").

While drawing the Tarzan comic strip, Foster wanted to do his own original newspaper feature, and he began work on a strip he called Derek, Son of Thane, later changing the title to Prince Arn. King Features manager Joseph Connolly eventually renamed it Prince Valiant. In 1936, after extensive research, Foster pitched his concept to William Randolph Hearst, who had long wanted to distribute a strip by Foster. Hearst was so impressed that he gave Foster ownership of the strip.

Prince Valiant began in full-color tabloid sections on Saturday February 13, 1937. The first full page was strip #16, which appeared in the Sunday New Orleans Times Picayune. The internal dating changed from Saturday to Sunday with strip #66 (May 15, 1938). The full-page strip continued until 1971, when strip #1788 was not offered in full-page format—it was the last strip Foster drew. The strip continues today by other artists in a half-page format.

== Characters and story ==
The setting is Arthurian. Valiant (Val) is a Nordic prince from Thule, located near present-day Trondheim on the Norwegian coast. Early in the story Valiant arrives at Camelot where he becomes friends with Sir Gawain and Sir Tristram. Earning the respect of King Arthur and Merlin, he becomes a Knight of the Round Table. On a Mediterranean island he meets the love of his life, Aleta, Queen of the Misty Isles, whom he later marries. He fights the Huns with his powerful Singing Sword, which, in a 1939 strip, a witch identifies with the legendary sword Flamberge, a magical blade apparently created by the same enchanter who forged Arthur's Excalibur. Val helps his father regain his lost throne of Thule, which has been usurped by the tyrant Sligon, and later travels to Africa and America.

When the strip starts in 1937, Val is five years old. The first episodes follow the youth through the wild Fens district of Britain with his father, the deposed King Aguar of Thule. When Val encounters the witch Horrit, she predicts he will have a life of adventure, but he will never be happy or content. Arriving home, Val discovers that his mother has died. Not long after this come encounters with Gawain, with gigantic creatures and with the glory of Camelot. Steve Donoghue comments:

At first, in the earliest months of Prince Valiant, Foster's Arthurian England might easily be confused with the Cimmeria of Conan the Barbarian: monsters abound. As a boy, Val fights a 'dragon' that looks a lot like a plesiosaur, and he fires his arrows at a rampaging swamp-turtle the size of a Zamboni. But only a few installments later, this has sublimated somewhat into history: when Val saves his new friend Sir Gawain from a robber knight and Gawain decides to take the villain to Camelot for summary judgement from King Arthur, the whole party is at one point attacked by another enormous beast—only this time it's a salt water crocodile!... When they all at length succeed in killing the beast, Val is outraged that Gawain still seeks to have the man tried before King Arthur. The young prince naturally speaks up in his outrage before the great king, his queen Guinevere and his feared wizard Merlin—and so a career at Camelot is born. Val becomes Gawain's squire and almost immediately accompanies him on a quest, during which Gawain is captured and Val must use his wits—smiling and laughing the whole time—to free his mentor. On the trip, Gawain is seriously wounded, and the large panel where Val finally gets him back to Camelot is Foster’s first genuine visual show-stopper in the strip.

Val acquires the Singing Sword in strips from 1938. The original owner of the Singing Sword is Prince Arn of Ord, Valiant's rival for the maid Ilene. The two men put aside their differences when Ilene is kidnapped by Viking raiders on her way to Ord. Arn hands Valiant the charmed sword to help him hold back their pursuers while he himself rides ahead to free Ilene. The pair continue in their efforts to rescue Ilene, eventually discovering that she has been killed in a shipwreck. Arn gives the Singing Sword to Valiant after that adventure and the two part as friends. Later in the series it is mentioned that the Singing Sword is a sister to King Arthur's Excalibur.

In the strips from 1939 Val is knighted by King Arthur, and the following year, he helps to restore his father as King of Thule. Moving across Britain, Europe, and the Holy Land, Val fights invading Goths, Huns and Saxons. In 1946, shortly after Val marries Aleta, she is kidnapped by the Viking raider Ulfran. Val's pursuit takes him past the Shetland Islands, the Faroe Islands, Iceland, Greenland, Newfoundland and the Saint Lawrence River, arriving at Niagara Falls 1,000 years before Columbus. Defeating Ulfran, Val is reunited with Aleta, and the couple spend that winter with friendly Native Americans.

In the strip dated August 31, 1947, Prince Arn, their first son, is born in America, and Val celebrates by getting drunk. The infant Arn is named after Val's old friend, Prince Arn of Ord, who likewise named his own son after Valiant. Val and Aleta's other children are the twins, Karen and Valeta (born 1951), Galan (1962) and Prince Nathan (1979). Agents of the Byzantine Emperor Justinian abduct Nathan shortly after his birth, and he is eventually rescued by Arn. Earlier, in strips from 1964, Arn leads an expedition to America. In strips from 1987 Val becomes a grandfather when Arn and his wife, Maeve, daughter of the traitorous Mordred, give birth to Ingrid. More recent stories have concentrated on Aleta, Maeve, and Morgan le Fay.

== History and myth ==
The historical and mythological elements of Prince Valiant were initially haphazard, but soon Foster attempted to bring the facts into order. Many elements of the story place it in the fifth century, such as the death of Attila the Hun in 453 and Geiseric's sacking of Rome in 455, which Prince Valiant and Aleta witness. The murder of Aëtius in 454 differs from the historical version; Valiant and Gawain are blamed for the murder and must flee.

Slightly fantastic elements, like "marsh monsters" (a dinosaur-like creature) and witches, were present in the early years but were later downplayed (as was Merlin's and Morgan le Fay's use of magic), so that by 1942, the story became more realistic.

The storyline is by no means historically accurate. While obviously meant to take place during the Later Roman Empire, Foster incorporated anachronistic elements: Viking longships, knights, Muslims, alchemists and technological advances not made before the Renaissance. The fortifications, dresses, armor and armament resemble the High Middle Ages rather than the fifth century.

== Other artists ==
In 1970, after tryout strips by several artists, Foster invited John Cullen Murphy to collaborate on the strip. Transition artists were:

- #1756 Foster
- #1757 Gray Morrow
- #1758 Foster
- #1759 Foster
- #1760 Murphy
- #1761 Foster
- #1762 Wally Wood
- #1763 Foster
- #1764 Murphy
- #1765 Gray Morrow
- #1766 Murphy
- #1767 Gray Morrow
- #1768 Foster
- #1769 Murphy
- #1770 Gray Morrow
- #1771–1772 Murphy
- #1773 Foster
- #1774–1775 Murphy
- #1776 Foster
- #1777 Gray Morrow
- #1778–1779 Murphy
- #1780 Gray Morrow
- #1781–1787 Murphy
- #1788 Foster (last)
- #1789–3502 Murphy

From 1971 on, Murphy drew the strip from Foster scripts and pencil sketches. Foster continued to write the continuity until strip #2241 in 1980. Murphy then drew it solo with scripts by his son Cullen Murphy, an editor of The Atlantic. Stories by Cullen Murphy included many adventures in which Val is opposed by the Emperor Justinian. John Cullen Murphy's daughter, Mairead, did the lettering and coloring. In March 2004, Murphy retired and turned the strip over to his chosen successor, illustrator Gary Gianni. Scripting duties were passed on to Mark Schultz with Scott Roberts providing the coloring. Schultz continued as the writer when Thomas Yeates began as the strip's artist on April 1, 2012.

Thomas Yeates is the current artist on the Prince Valiant strip.

== Awards ==
Hal Foster was recognized for his work on the strip with the Banshees' Silver Lady award in 1952, followed by the National Cartoonists Society's Reuben Award in 1957, their Story Comic Strip Award in 1964, their Special Features Award in 1966 and 1967, the Gold Key award in 1977, and the Elzie Segar Award in 1978. He was inducted into the Will Eisner Hall of Fame in 1996, and in 2005 he was inducted into the Joe Shuster Canadian Comic Book Creators Hall of Fame for his contributions to comic books. In 2006, Foster was inducted into the Society of Illustrators Hall of Fame. At age 73, Foster was elected to membership in Great Britain's Royal Society of Arts, an honor given to very few Americans.

Murphy received the National Cartoonists Society Story Comic Strip Award for his work on the strip in 1971, 1974, 1976, 1978, 1984 and 1987. In 1995, the strip was one of 20 included in the Comic Strip Classics series of commemorative postage stamps.

== Reprints ==
This is the Fantagraphics reprint of the first Prince Valiant strips.

The Medieval Castle (1957) collected the comic strip which ran beneath Prince Valiant from April 23, 1944 - November 18, 1945 as a result of the government's WWII request that syndicates reduce strip size to save paper for the war effort. The three-panel strip followed the adventures of two young English squires, Arn and Guy, during the First Crusade.

- Hastings House produced seven hardback Prince Valiant books in the 1950s, using the illustrations by Foster but with the text simplified by Max Trell and for the last two books by James Flowers. This series was reprinted in Germany as Prinz Eisenherz (Prince Ironheart) and continued there for an additional five volumes.
- Nostalgia Press published four hardback reprints in conjunction with King Features. Some entire panels were colored solid pink or solid purple.
- Prince Valiant: An American Epic, from Manuscript Press, reprinted the first three years in three volumes, in the full original color and full page size. They also published a hardback omnibus of the three years, in a limited edition of 26 copies ISBN 0-936414-09-X, and a print of Hal Foster's last Prince Valiant page, so that all Foster pages would be available in full page format.
- Fantagraphics published a set of 50 trade paperbacks reprinting all of the strips written by Hal Foster, including those drawn by John Cullen Murphy.
- Andrews McMeel published Prince Valiant: Far from Camelot, the only collection of creators Gary Gianni and Mark Schultz's current strips, dating from November 21, 2004, to May 11, 2008.
- A French reprinting of all the Foster-drawn strips was published by Editions Zenda in a green cloth, embossed hardcover series with dustjacket. Featuring two years' worth of strips per volume, it was printed from the original color pages with typeset lettering.
- Prince Valiant has often been reprinted in comic books. Feature Book #26 reprints most of the first year of the strip, and is the only comic book to have an original cover by Hal Foster. Many Foster strips were reprinted in the pages of Ace Comics and King Comics. Not reprints are seven Dell four-color Prince Valiant comic books (#567, 650, 699, 719, 788, 849, 900) drawn by Bob Fujitani, writer unknown. A 1973 Prince Valiant comic book reprinted Foster art with a simplified text intended to teach reading to children.
- Prince Valiant by Fantagraphics Books is a hardcover collection of the comic strip in full color, published since 2009. In 2018 they completed their reprint of all the Prince Valiant pages drawn by Hal Foster in eighteen volumes. This excluded his work for page 2000, published on June 8, 1975. With a total of thirty volumes published so far as of 2025, FB plan to finish reprinting all the pages drawn by John Cullen Murphy, which began at the end of Volume 17, and would end with Volume 34 (John Cullen Murphy's last pages from 2003-2004), probably by end of 2028. The Dutch edition was published by Silvester Strips in a translation by comic strip artist Mark van Broekhoven.

== Film and TV adaptations ==
- Prince Valiant is a 1954 American motion picture by 20th Century Fox, filmed in color and Cinemascope. Directed by Henry Hathaway, it starred James Mason, Robert Wagner (in the title role), Janet Leigh and Sterling Hayden. The film was also adapted into a comic book, Dell Four Color #567.
- Prince Valiant also appeared in the episode "Terror in Time" of Defenders of the Earth.
- The Legend of Prince Valiant, a 1991 animated American television series seen on The Family Channel in the US and CBBC in the UK, is available on DVD.
- Prince Valiant is a 1997 UK/Ireland/Germany film starring Stephen Moyer, Katherine Heigl, Thomas Kretschmann, Edward Fox, Joanna Lumley and Ron Perlman. The soundtrack of the film score by David Bergeaud was released on February 20, 2003 by Perseverance Records.

== Other media ==
- In addition to two Prince Valiant phonograph records (released in 1947 and 1968) and three coloring books, Treasure Books published a small 1954 children's book with Foster art in color.
- Marvel Comics published a four-part miniseries titled Prince Valiant in 1994.
- Bastei in Germany published a six-issue series titled Die Legende von Prinz Eisenherz in 1994, based on the animated TV series.
- Chaosium produced a Prince Valiant: The Story-Telling Game role-playing game. In 1999, Pyramid magazine named the Prince Valiant Role-playing Game as one of "The Millennium's Most Underrated Games". Editor Scott Haring commented that "Prince Valiant was designed as a beginner's introduction to roleplaying... Perhaps the subject matter's perceived lack of 'cool' killed this game, but it deserved better". In 2016, Stewart Wieck used crowdfunding platform Kickstarter to reprint the game.

== See also ==
- Capitán Trueno
- List of films based on Arthurian legend

== General and cited references ==
- Hal Foster: Prince of Illustrators by Brian M. Kane, Vanguard Productions, 2001. IPPY Award-winning biography of Hal Foster. ISBN 1-887591-25-7
- A Prince Valiant Companion by Todd Goldberg and Carl Horak, edited by Don Markstein and Rick Norwood, Manuscript Press. ISBN 0-936414-07-3
- The Definitive Prince Valiant Companion compiled by Brian M. Kane, Fantagraphics Books, 2009. ISBN 978-1-60699-305-7
- The Prince Valiant Page by Gary Gianni, Flesk Publications, 2008. ISBN 978-1-933865-04-1
