= Annie (franchise) =

American media franchise

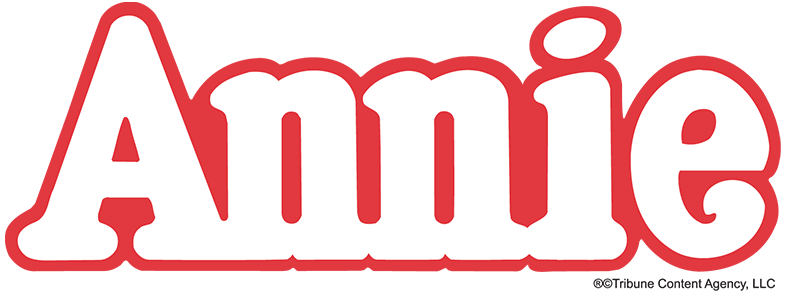
- Created by: Harold Gray
- Original work: Little Orphan Annie
- Owners: Tribune Content Agency In partnership with Columbia Pictures (Sony Pictures) and MPL Communications

Print publications
- Book: The Complete Little Orphan Annie (2008)
- Comic strip: Little Orphan Annie (1924-2010)

Films and television
- Films: Little Orphan Annie (1932); Little Orphan Annie (1938); Annie (1982); Life After Tomorrow (2006); Annie (2014)
- Television films: Annie: A Royal Adventure! (1996); Annie (1999); Annie Live! (2021)
- Direct-to-video: Little Orphan Annie's A Very Animated Christmas (1995)

Theatrical presentations
- Musicals: Annie (1976); Annie 2: Miss Hannigan's Revenge (1989); Annie Warbucks (1992)

Audio
- Radio program: Little Orphan Annie (1931-1942)
- Soundtracks: Annie (1977); Annie (1999); Annie (2014)
- Original music: It's the Hard Knock Life; Tomorrow; Little Girls; You're Never Fully Dressed Without a Smile

Annie is an American media franchise created by Harold Gray. The original comic strip created by Harold Gray, Little Orphan Annie, The comic strip took its name from the 1885 poem "Little Orphant Annie" by James Whitcomb Riley. Its most notable adaptation is the 1977 musical Annie that won 7 Tony Awards which has been adapted four times on screen for both the big screen and television (1982, 1999, 2014 and 2021). The musical also has two sequels titled Annie 2: Miss Hannigan's Revenge (1989) and Annie Warbucks (1992). The 1982 film also has a television film sequel Annie: A Royal Adventure! (1995).

The comic strip has also been adapted into a radio program that aired from 1924 to 1942, two pre-musical films of the same name (1932 and 1938), a compilation of the comics in a book series, and a direct-to-video film titled Little Orphan Annie's A Very Animated Christmas (1995).

== History ==
After World War I, cartoonist Harold Gray joined the Chicago Tribune which, at that time, was being reworked by owner Joseph Medill Patterson into an important national journal. As part of his plan, Patterson wanted to publish comic strips that would lend themselves to nationwide syndication and to film and radio adaptations. Gray's strips were consistently rejected by Patterson, but Little Orphan Annie was finally accepted and debuted in a test run on August 5, 1924, in the New York Daily News, a Tribune-owned tabloid. Reader response was positive, and Annie began appearing as a Sunday strip in the Tribune on November 2 and as a daily strip on November 10. It was soon offered for syndication and picked up by the Toronto Star and The Atlanta Constitution.

On May 13, 2010, Tribune Media Services announced that the strip's final installment would appear on Sunday, June 13, 2010, ending after 86 years. At the time of the cancellation announcement, it was running in fewer than 20 newspapers, some of which, such as the New York Daily News, had carried the strip for its entire life. The final cartoonist, Ted Slampyak, said, "It's kind of painful. It's almost like mourning the loss of a friend." Since the cancellation, rerun strips have been running on the GoComics site.

== Musicals ==
=== Annie ===
In 1933, after the Great Depression, a young orphan named Annie Bennett is living in the Hudson St. Home for Girls in New York City, which is run by Miss Hannigan, a cruel alcoholic who forces the orphans to clean the building daily. With half of a locket as her only possession, Annie remains optimistic that her parents, who left her on the doorstep as a baby, will return for her. Annie sneaks out with help from a laundry man and adopts a stray dog, which she names Sandy, though she is quickly found and brought back to the orphanage.

Grace Farrell, secretary to billionaire Oliver Warbucks, arrives to invite an orphan to live with Warbucks for a week in order to improve his public image. Annie is chosen and she and Sandy travel to Warbucks' mansion. Though she is welcomed by the staff, Warbucks is disappointed as he wanted a boy orphan. However, he is quickly charmed into letting her stay after taking her sight-seeing in New York City. Later, he meets with Miss Hannigan, convincing her to sign the adoption papers while she drunkenly tries to seduce him. Warbucks reveals his plans to Annie, even offering her a new locket, but she declines. She explains the purpose of her broken locket and her hope that her parents will return with the other half. Warbucks appears on a radio show and offers a $50,000 reward to find Annie's parents, attracting the attention of Hannigan's brother and con-artist "Rooster" and his girlfriend Lily St. Regis. Hannigan, Rooster, and Lily devise a plan to pose as Annie's birth parents and use the other half of her locket as proof. Annie's friends overhear the conversation and try to sneak out, but are caught and locked away.

Meanwhile, Annie and Warbucks fly to the White House to talk with President Franklin D. Roosevelt and his wife Eleanor. Roosevelt informs them of his plan to introduce a social welfare program to help America's impoverished and asks Warbucks to head it. Later, Rooster and Lily arrive and pretend to be Annie's parents. As they have the locket, Warbucks and Grace believe them. They ask Annie to stay one more night for Christmas Eve festivities and Rooster and Lily reluctantly agree. When they return the next day, they attempt to take Annie but are confronted by FDR, who reveals Lily and Rooster's true identities. They are both arrested and Miss Hannigan arrives with the orphans. Though Hannigan tries to sweet talk her way into staying at the mansion but is arrested as well. The orphans are all given presents and Annie is officially adopted by Warbucks.

=== Sequels ===
==== Annie 2: Miss Hannigan's Revenge ====
Daddy Warbucks discovers that he has to be married to officially adopt Annie...apparently. So he decides to throw a nationwide contest to find his new wife, with Annie and the United Mothers of America head, Mrs. Christmas, helping him to decide. Meanwhile, Miss Hannigan escapes from prison and, hearing about this contest, disguises herself as “Charlotte O’Hara”. She finds a girl that looks identical to Annie and successfully sneaks into the contest. She kidnaps the real Annie and replaces her with the doppelg-Annie-r. It all leads to a climax of chasing, wrestling, and arresting.

Annie 2: Miss Hannigan's Revenge was performed December 22, 1989 through January 20, 1990 in Washington, DC. While it originally planned to transfer to Broadway, but this was cancelled after negative reviews. As with the first musical, it was written by Charles Strouse and Martin Charnin.

==== Annie Warbucks ====
On Christmas morning in 1933, Child Welfare Commissioner Harriet Doyle arrives on the scene to inform Daddy Warbucks he must marry within sixty days or else the child will be returned to the orphanage. Daddy Warbucks' whirlwind search for a fitting bride uncovers not only a plot by Doyle and her daughter Sheila Kelly to strip him of his fortune, but also his true feelings for his long-time assistant, Grace Farrell. A gaggle of cute little girls seeking parents and President Franklin D. Roosevelt return to take part in the shenanigans.

== Theatrical films ==
=== Little Orphan Annie (1932) ===
Oliver "Daddy" Warbucks is going away to find gold. He must leave Annie and Sandy, and promises that when he gets back, they'll be rich. On the way home, Sandy finds a little boy named Mickey crying behind a fence. Mickey is upset because his grandmother died, and he is being forced to go to an orphanage.

=== Little Orphan Annie (1938) ===
Annie is befriended by a fight manager, "Pop" Corrigan. She brings him Johnny Adams, a promising prizefighter. Annie gets the people of the neighborhood to finance his training. But on the night of Johnny's big fight, a gambling syndicate locks him in a gymnasium, and it appears the neighborhood folks will lose their investment.

=== Annie (1982) ===
The film follows the same plot of the musical except for some small changes. The biggest difference is the ending of the film. Instead of being caught at Warbucks' mansion, Rooster and Lily succeed with the ruse and Annie is kidnapped. However, her friends ultimately reach Warbucks and tell him the truth; shocked and horrified, he informs the FBI and the police, who begin a citywide search. Annie convinces the felons to pull over, only to escape and destroy Warbucks's check. In his fury, Rooster chases Annie up a raised railroad bridge in an effort to kill her; Miss Hannigan, who never wanted Annie hurt, attempts to stop Rooster, but her own brother knocks her out. Punjab, one of Warbucks' bodyguards, is able to rescue Annie, reuniting her with Warbucks and Grace. Hannigan also redeems herself at a Fourth of July party outside Warbucks' mansion instead of being arrested. In addition to Punjab, another bodyguard named The Asp is added to the film. Another change is the addition of the song "Let's Go To the Movies," which replaces "N.Y.C." Instead of exploring the city, Warbucks takes Annie and Grace to see Camille at Radio City Music Hall.

=== Annie (2014) ===
Set in its own era (2014) rather than the 1930s, the story follows Annie, this time in a foster home run by Miss Hannigan. In some modern changes from the original film, Annie has more initiative in her attempts to find her birth parents. For example, she spends Fridays outside Domani's Restaurant, believing her parents will come for her because a note written on a receipt from Domani's says they will return. Annie also finds out her social security number and makes a copy of it so she can do research on her family background. Many characters' names and stories are changed as well. Oliver Warbucks is changed to Will Stacks, a wealthy and germophobic politician. Stacks finds out about Annie's story through a viral video. Miss Hannigan's first name, Agatha in previous versions, is changed to Colleen. Another big change is the removal of Lily St. Regis, and Rooster's character is changed to Guy Danlily, one of Stacks' advisors and Colleen's lover (instead of her brother). Punjab's name is also changed to Nash and Mr. Bundles is renamed Lou and is a bodega owner rather than a laundry man. Several orphans' names are changed to more modern names as well. For example, Duffy is renamed Isabella Sullivan and Molly is changed to Mia Putnam.

== Direct-to-video film ==
=== Little Orphan Annie's A Very Animated Christmas (1995) ===
In a retelling of A Christmas Carol, Warbucks is portrayed as a callous Ebenezer Scrooge-type character where his encounter with Annie makes him realize the importance of charity.

== Television films ==
=== Annie: A Royal Adventure! (1995) ===
A television sequel to the 1982 film titled Annie: A Royal Adventure! was distributed on Sony Pictures Television on November 18, 1995. The film takes place a year after the first film and follows Annie's trip to London where Warbucks is to be knighted by King George V. However, Annie and her friends get tangled up in a scheme with Lady Edwina Hogbottom, who schemes to blow up Buckingham Palace.

=== Annie (1999) ===
The film follows the same plot of the 1982 film with some minor changes, reverting more closely to the plot of the 1977 stage musical. In the beginning of the film, Annie tries to escape the orphanage once before she successfully does so. In the original film, Miss Hannigan is in love with Mr. Bundles, her laundry man, as well as Warbucks. However, in this film, Miss Hannigan tells Bundles that she is saving herself for Warbucks. The film also replaces the song "Let's Go To the Movies" from the 1982 film with "N.Y.C." from the original musical. Later in the film, Miss Hannigan portrays Annie's mother instead of Lily, who stays behind with the girls in the orphanage, to whom she carelessly reveals Rooster's plan. In the end of this film, Miss Hannigan is admitted to a psychiatric hospital, an ending not featured in the musical or the original film.

=== Annie Live! (2021) ===
A live musical special of Annie and premiered on NBC on December 2, 2021, starring Celina Smith

== Documentary ==
=== Life After Tomorrow (2006) ===
A 2006 documentary titled Life After Tomorrow follows the lives of different women who have played Annie Bennett or different orphans in the Annie musical. It is directed by Gil Cates Jr. and Julie Stevens who played Tessie and Pepper respectively in different Broadway productions.

== Cast and characters ==
Role	Feature films				TV films			Musical
Role	Little Orphan Annie	Little Orphan Annie	Annie	Annie	Annie: A Royal Adventure!	Annie	Annie Live!	Original Broadway Cast
Role	1932	1938	1982	2014	1995	1999	2021	1977
Annie Bennett	Mitzi Green	Ann Gillis	Aileen Quinn	Quvenzhané Wallis	Ashley Johnson	Alicia Morton	Celina Smith	Andrea McArdle
Oliver "Daddy" Warbucks	Edgar Kennedy		Albert Finney	Jamie Foxx (Note: Renamed Will Stacks)	George Hearn	Victor Garber	Harry Connick Jr.	Reid Shelton
Mickey	Buster Phelps							
Mrs. Stewart	May Robson							
Dr. Griffiths	Matt Moore							
Johnny Adams		Robert Kent						
Mary Ellen		June Travis						
"Pop" Corrigan		J. Farrell MacDonald						
Tom Jennings		J.M. Kerrigan						
Agatha "Aggy" Hannigan			Carol Burnett	Cameron Diaz (Note: Renamed Colleen Hannigan)	Carol Cleveland	Kathy Bates	Taraji P. Henson	Dorothy Loudon
Grace Farrell			Ann Reinking	Rose Byrne		Audra McDonald	Nicole Scherzinger	Sandy Faison
Daniel Francis "Rooster" Hannigan			Tim Curry			Alan Cumming	Tituss Burgess	Robert Fitch
Lily St. Regis			Bernadette Peters			Kristin Chenoweth	Megan Hilty	Barbara Erwing
Franklin D. Roosevelt			Edward Herrmann			Dennis Howard	Alan Toy	Raymond Thorne
Punjab			Geoffrey Holder	Adewale Akinnuoye-Agbaje (Note: Renamed Nash)	Antony Zaki			
Guy Danlily				Bobby Cannavale				
Lady Edwina Hogbottom					Joan Collins			
Molly			Toni Ann Gisondi	Nicolette Pierini (Note: Renamed Mia Putnam)	Camilla Belle	Sarah Hyland	Felice Kakaletris	Danielle Brisebois
Pepper			Rosanne Sorrentino	Amanda Troya		Marissa Rago	Audrey Cymone	Robyn Finn
Kate			April Lerman			Lalaine	Cate Elefante	Shelley Bruce
Duffy			Robin Ignico	Eden Duncan-Smith (Note: Renamed Isabella Sullivan)		Danielle Wilson	Arwen Monzon-Sanders	Donna Graham
July			Lucie Stewart			Nanea Miyata	Sophie Knapp	Janine Ruane
Tessie			Lara Berk	Zoe Colletti		Erin Adams	Tessa Frascogna	Diana Barrows
Hannah					Emma Ann Lloyd			

== Crew ==
Role	Feature films				Direct-to-video film	TV films	
Role	Little Orphan Annie 1932	Little Orphan Annie 1938	Annie 1982	Annie 2014	Little Orphan Annie's A Very Animated Christmas 1995	Annie: A Royal Adventure! 1995	Annie 1999
Director(s)	John S. Robertson and Charles Kerr (assistant)	Ben Holmes	John Huston	Will Gluck	Gwen Wetzler	Ian Toynton	Rob Marshall
Producer(s)	David O. Selznick	John Speaks	Ray Stark	James Lassiter, Will Gluck, Jada Pinkett Smith, Will Smith, Caleeb Pinkett, Shawn "Jay-Z" Carter, Laurence "Jay" Brown, and Tyran "Ty Ty" Smith	Stephanie Graziano, Michael Hack, and Gwen Wetzler	Wendy Dytman and Ruth Slawson	John Whitman and Brad Krevoy
Executive producer(s)	David O. Selznick	John Speaks	Joe Layton and Carol Sobieski	Alicia Emmrich and Celia D. Costas	Michael E. Uslan and Benjamin Melniker	Wendy Dytman and Ruth Slawson	Craig Zadan, Neil Meron, Chris Montan, and Marykay Powell
Story by	Tom McNamara and Wanda Tuchock	Samuel Ornitz and Endre Bohem	Thomas Meehan	Thomas Meehan	Michael E. Uslan	Trish Soodik	Thomas Meehan
Screenwriter(s)	Tom McNamara and Wanda Tuchock	Budd Schulberg and Samuel Ornitz	Carol Sobieski	Will Gluck and Aline Brosh McKenna	Michael E. Uslan	Trish Soodik	Irene Mecchi
Songwriter(s)	—N/a	—N/a	Charles Strouse and Martin Charnin	Charles Strouse, Martin Charnin, Sia, and Greg Kurstin	—N/a	—N/a	Charles Strouse and Martin Charnin
Composer(s)	Max Steiner	George Bassman, Louis Forbes, and Joseph Nussbaum	Ralph Burns	Greg Kurstin	Andrew Dimitroff	David Michael Frank	Danny Troob
Editor(s)	George Hively	Robert Bischoff	Michael A. Stevenson	Tia Nolan	Peter Grives	James Galloway	Scott Vickrey

== Music ==
- "It's the Hard Knock Life"
- "Tomorrow"
- "Little Girls"
- "You're Never Fully Dressed Without a Smile"

== Radio show ==
In 1931, a radio adaptation of the comic strip was aired on NBC Radio. The program was adapted by narrated by Pierre Andre and directed by Alan Wallace. The show aired from 1931 to 1942. Radio historian Jim Harmon attributes the show's popularity in The Great Radio Heroes to the fact that it was the only radio show to deal with and appeal to young children.

== Book series ==
In 2008 The Library of American Comics began publishing The Complete Little Orphan Annie, a series of books compiling the complete run of the comic strip. The series is overseen by Dean Mullaney.

== Reception ==
=== Box office performance ===
Film	Release date	Box Office Gross			Budget	Ref
Film	Release date	Domestic	Foreign	Worldwide	Budget	Ref
Annie	May 21, 1982	$57,059,003	$4,858	$57,063,861	$50,000,000	
Annie	December 7, 2014	$85,911,262	$50,942,244	$136,853,506	$65,000,000	
Total		$142,970,265	$50,947,102	$193,917,367	$115,000,000	

=== Critical response ===
Film	Rotten Tomatoes	Metacritic
Annie (1982)	57% (28 reviews)	33 (38 reviews)
Annie (2014)	28% (161 reviews)	39 (10 reviews)
