= Annie Live! =

2021 musical television special

- Promotional logo
- Genre: Musical
- Based on: Annie by Thomas Meehan; Little Orphan Annie by Harold Gray
- Written by: Thomas Meehan
- Directed by: Lear deBessonet; Alex Rudzinski
- Starring: Celina Smith; Harry Connick Jr.; Taraji P. Henson; Nicole Scherzinger; Tituss Burgess; Megan Hilty
- Composers: Charles Strouse; Martin Charnin
- Country of origin: United States
- Original language: English

Production
- Executive producers: Robert Greenblatt; Alex Rudzinski; Neil Meron
- Production locations: Bethpage, New York
- Running time: 127 minutes
- Production companies: Chloe Productions; The Green Room; Zadan/Meron Productions; Sony Pictures Television Studios

Original release
- Network: NBC
- Release: December 2, 2021

Annie Live! is an American musical television special that aired on NBC on December 2, 2021. It features a performance of the 1977 Broadway musical Annie, which is based on the comic strip Little Orphan Annie by Harold Gray. The production was the fourth on-screen version of the musical following the 1982 theatrical film starring Carol Burnett, Aileen Quinn and Albert Finney (from which the songs "Sign" and "We Got Annie" were taken), the 1999 television film starring Kathy Bates, Alicia Morton and Victor Garber, and the 2014 theatrical film starring Cameron Diaz, Quvenzhané Wallis and Jamie Foxx.

The special stars newcomer Celina Smith as the title role, Harry Connick Jr. as Daddy Warbucks, Taraji P. Henson as Miss Hannigan, Nicole Scherzinger as Grace Farrell, Tituss Burgess as Rooster Hannigan, and Megan Hilty as Lily St. Regis. The special was directed by Lear deBessonet and Alex Rudzinski.

== Plot ==
At an orphanage in New York City, it is 3 A.M., and one of the girls has a nightmare. Some of the girls are annoyed at being woken up. Annie tries to comfort the girl, named Molly, by singing “Maybe”. Miss Hannigan comes in and tells the girls to take everything off their beds and scrub the floors, even though by this time it is 4 in the morning. They perform "It's the Hard-Knock Life" and Annie sneaks into the cart which the laundry man will take with him.

Annie discovers the dog Sandy and performs "Tomorrow". A police officer asks Annie what she is doing out at night and about the dog. Annie claims it is hers and the cop tells her to put the dog on a better leash and give it a license. Then Annie encounters a Hooverville, where the homeless population living there complains about former president Hoover and what has happened to their lives. A police officer runs everyone off and Annie is returned to the orphanage.

Grace shows up at the orphanage and mentions the officer in charge, leading Miss Hannigan to believe she is there to inspect the place. Grace is actually there to select an orphan to spend Christmas 1933 with Oliver Warbucks, a billionaire. Annie is there and when Miss Hannigan asks what qualities the orphan should have, Annie appears to meet all the requirements, so she gets to spend Christmas in a mansion on Fifth Avenue. When she arrives, Annie finds everything and everyone to be so nice. Annie and the cast perform "I Think I'm Gonna Like It Here".

Warbucks arrives back at home after several weeks of touring his factories, many of which are closing, and he's not happy. President Roosevelt is one of many who has left a phone message, but even he isn't important enough to call back right away since Warbucks is a Republican. Seeing Annie, Warbucks wonders why Grace brought a girl because an orphan is supposed to be a boy. Still, Annie wins the man over. While Warbucks was going to spend the evening catching up on work, he takes Annie and Grace to see a Broadway show.

Miss Hannigan gets a visit from her criminal brother Rooster and his latest girlfriend Lily St. Regis. After hearing about Annie living with Warbucks, they perform "Easy Street".

Warbucks likes Annie so much that he wants to adopt her. When he gives Annie a locket to replace her old one, she gets very upset. She explains to him that her real parents will come back for her according to the note left with her when she was abandoned. She has half a locket and they have the other half. When the two halves match, that's how Annie will know she has found her real parents. Warbucks agrees to search for Annie's parents, calling "J. Edgar" to put his best men on it. Warbucks and Annie go on Bert Healy's NBC radio show and Warbucks offers a $50,000 reward if Annie's parents are found.

Hearing about the reward, Rooster and Lily put on disguises and succeed in fooling Miss Hannigan. They say they will claim to be Annie's long-lost parents from Canada, who were having a hard time when they gave her up, but now they are fine. They agree to split the reward money with Miss Hannigan, who was sent items after a fire that belong to Annie. This includes the locket that will prove who her parents are.

Warbucks and Annie visit President Roosevelt, who is meeting with his cabinet. They do not know what to do about the economy, but a woman on the radio is criticizing Roosevelt. Annie starts singing "Tomorrow" and the others join in. FDR can only speak the words. Then he announces Annie has inspired him to create government jobs so people won't have to take handouts—a "New Deal". Warbucks receives a telegram telling him to come right home.

Grace has screened numerous potential parents for Annie and all have lied. When Annie arrives home, she is given the sad news. Also, Eliot Ness has sent the news that the locket given to Annie was very common and it would be impossible to track down the people who bought it. Warbucks says if Annie's real parents cannot be found, he will adopt her, and the cast sings "I Don't Need Anything But You".

Then people who claim to be Mr. and Mrs. Mudge show up, with proof they are Annie's parents. This includes a birth certificate, and the most important thing, the locket. But there is little excitement. Everyone seems disappointed. Warbucks mentions the reward, and Mr. Mudge, actually Rooster, refuses the reward money at first. Then he claims to realize they can take the $50,000 and give Annie a nice life in the country in New Jersey. However, Mr. and Mrs. Mudge will have to come back tomorrow.

The next morning, Warbucks has news. J. Edgar Hoover has determined Annie's real parents are deceased. The real identities of Mr. and Mrs. Mudge have been found to be Rooster and Lily, so when they show up, Roosevelt is present. When Warbucks asks if the Secret Service with him have policing rights since Rooster and Lily committed fraud, Roosevelt says they do as Rooster and Lily are arrested. Miss Hannigan also shows up with all of Annie's friends and tries to claim the reward, but she is told she is an accomplice and will have to be arrested as well. Annie pleads for Miss Hannigan to go free and Warbucks agrees she will be given a job helping out with the construction of new bridges and railroads as part of the "New Deal". Warbucks has Drake take Miss Hannigan to the East Wing while the Secret Service take Rooster and Lily away.

Sometime later during the Christmas season, the entire cast celebrates because Annie and Molly will be adopted by "Daddy Warbucks", as Annie calls him for the first time. Rooster and Lily are shown on work release helping Miss Hannigan decorate the Christmas tree.

== Cast and characters ==
- Celina Smith as Annie Bennett Warbucks
- Harry Connick Jr. as Oliver "Daddy" Warbucks
- Taraji P. Henson as Miss Hannigan
- Nicole Scherzinger as Grace Farrell, chief of staff to Oliver Warbucks
- Tituss Burgess as Rooster Hannigan
- Megan Hilty as Lily St. Regis
- Jeff Kready as Bert Healy
- Alan Toy as Franklin Delano Roosevelt
- McKenzie Kurtz as Star to Be
- Arwen Monzon-Sanders as Duffy
- Audrey Cymone as Pepper
- Cate Elefante as Kate
- Felice Kakaletris as Molly
- Sophie Knapp as July
- Tessa Frascogna as Tessie
- Jacob Keith Watson as Mr. Bundles
- Kennedy Rae Thompson as Orphan

== Musical numbers ==
- "Overture" – Orchestra
- "Maybe" – Annie and Orphans
- "It's the Hard-Knock Life" – Annie and Orphans
- "It's the Hard Knock Life" (Reprise)" † – Orphans
- "Tomorrow" – Annie
- "We'd Like to Thank You, Herbert Hoover" – Hooverville-ites
- "Little Girls" – Miss Hannigan
- "Little Girls" (Reprise)" † – Miss Hannigan
- "I Think I'm Gonna Like It Here" – Grace, Annie, and Staff
- "N.Y.C." – Warbucks, Grace, Annie, Star to Be, and New Yorkers
- "Sign" * – Miss Hannigan and Warbucks
- "Easy Street" – Rooster, Miss Hannigan, and Lily
- "We Got Annie" * – Grace and Staff
- "Maybe (Reprise)" † - Grace and Annie
- "You're Never Fully Dressed Without a Smile" – Bert Healy, Boylan Sisters, and Orphans
- "Easy Street (Reprise)" † - Rooster and Lily
- "Tomorrow (Cabinet Reprise)" – Annie, F.D.R., Warbucks, and Cabinet
- "Something Was Missing" – Warbucks
- "I Don't Need Anything But You" – Annie, Warbucks, and Staff
- "Maybe (Warbucks' Reprise)" – Warbucks
- "Annie/I Don't Need Anything But You (Reprise)" † – Company
- "A New Deal For Christmas" - Company
- "Tomorrow" (Finale) – Company

† Denote reprises that were not included on the accompanying soundtrack.
* Denote songs written for the 1982 film adaptation.

== Production ==
=== Development ===
The project was announced by NBC on May 12, 2021 with Alex Rudzinski as the live television director and Lear deBessonet as the program director. It was also announced that Sergio Trujillo would choreograph the production. Other members of the production team included Emilio Sosa as costume designer, Jason Sherwood as scenic designer and Stephen Oremus providing new orchestrations. The special was executive produced by Rudzinski, Robert Greenblatt and Neil Meron. Rehearsals began in October in New York.

On June 8, 2021, it was announced that Taraji P. Henson had been cast as Miss Hannigan in the production. Later, more casting was announced including Harry Connick Jr. as Daddy Warbucks, Nicole Scherzinger as Grace Farrell, Tituss Burgess as Rooster Hannigan, and Jane Krakowski as Lily St. Regis.

In June 2021, NBC also announced that they would be holding a nationwide audition for the titular role, similarly to the casting of Shanice Williams as Dorothy Gale in The Wiz Live! and Maddie Baillio as Tracy Turnblad in Hairspray Live! Celina Smith was ultimately cast as Annie.

In November 2021, Krakowski stepped down from her role due to a breakthrough case of COVID-19 and was replaced by Megan Hilty. Also, it was announced that Andrea McArdle, who originated the role of Annie on Broadway, had been cast as Eleanor Roosevelt. McArdle, however, stepped away from the production in late November due to the hospitalization of her father. The part was subsequently written out, however McArdle still appears on the cast recording.

=== Filming ===
The broadcast was filmed at Gold Coast Studios in Bethpage, New York.

=== Release ===
The special premiered on NBC on December 2, 2021, and was later released on Blu-ray and DVD by Universal Pictures Home Entertainment.

== Reception ==
The special, which was broadcast on December 2, 2021 by NBC, received 5.34 million viewers during its airing. After a week, the number of viewers rose to 6.29 million.

Annie Live! received generally positive reviews from critics. On the review aggregator website Rotten Tomatoes, 100% of 11 critics' reviews are positive, with an average rating of 8.7/10. Metacritic, which uses a weighted average, assigned the film a score of 76 out of 100, based on 7 critics, indicating "generally favorable" reviews.

== Accolades ==
Year	Award	Category	Nominee(s)	Result	Ref.
2022	Costume Designers Guild Awards	Excellence in Variety, Reality-Competition or Live Television	Emilio Sosa	Nominated	
2022	NAACP Image Awards	Outstanding Actress in a Television Movie, Limited Series or Dramatic Special	Taraji P. Henson	Won	
2022	NAACP Image Awards	Outstanding Supporting Actor in a Television Movie, Limited-Series or Dramatic Special	Tituss Burgess	Nominated	
2022	NAACP Image Awards	Outstanding Performance by a Youth (Series, Special, Television Movie or Limited Series)	Celina Smith	Nominated	
2022	Primetime Emmy Awards	Outstanding Choreography for Variety or Reality Programming	Sergio Trujillo	Nominated	
2022	Primetime Emmy Awards	Outstanding Hairstyling for a Variety, Nonfiction or Reality Program	Mia Neal and Leah Loukas	Won	
2022	Primetime Emmy Awards	Outstanding Lighting Design / Lighting Direction for a Variety Special	Robert Barnhart, Pete Radice, Ben Green, Madigan Stehly, and Robert Styles	Nominated	
