= Annie (1982 film) =

American musical drama film

- Theatrical release poster
- Directed by: John Huston
- Screenplay by: Carol Sobieski
- Based on: Annie (1977 musical) by; Charles Strouse; Martin Charnin; Thomas Meehan; Little Orphan Annie (comics) by Harold Gray
- Produced by: Ray Stark
- Starring: Albert Finney; Carol Burnett; Bernadette Peters; Ann Reinking; Tim Curry; Geoffrey Holder; Edward Herrmann; Aileen Quinn
- Cinematography: Richard Moore
- Edited by: Michael A. Stevenson
- Music by: Charles Strouse
- Production company: Rastar
- Distributed by: Columbia Pictures
- Release date: May 21, 1982
- Running time: 128 minutes
- Country: United States
- Language: English
- Budget: $35 million
- Box office: $57.1 million

Annie is a 1982 American musical comedy-drama film, based on the 1977 Broadway musical by Charles Strouse, Martin Charnin and Thomas Meehan, which in turn is based on the Little Orphan Annie comic strip created by Harold Gray. Directed by John Huston and written by Carol Sobieski, it stars Albert Finney, Carol Burnett, Bernadette Peters, Ann Reinking, Tim Curry, Geoffrey Holder, Edward Herrmann, and introducing Aileen Quinn in her film debut as the title character. It is the first film adaptation of the musical.

Set during the Great Depression in 1933, the film tells the story of Annie, an orphan from New York City who is taken in by America's richest billionaire, Oliver Warbucks. Principal photography took place for six weeks at Monmouth University and at Warner Bros. Burbank Studios in 1981.

Produced by Ray Stark's Rastar and released by Columbia Pictures on May 21, 1982, Annie received mixed reviews from film critics and grossed $57 million on a $35 million budget. The film was nominated for two Academy Awards for Best Art Direction and Best Song Score and its Adaptation. A television film sequel, titled Annie: A Royal Adventure!, was released in 1995. It was followed by three additional adaptations of the musical. In their first film collaboration, Disney and Columbia Pictures produced a second film adaptation made-for-television in 1999. Columbia released a third film adaptation on December 19, 2014. A fourth adaptation, which was a live production of the musical, was performed on December 2, 2021, on NBC.

== Plot ==
In 1933 during the Great Depression, a young orphan named Annie is living in the Hudson Street Orphanage in New York City. It is run by Agatha Hannigan, a cruel alcoholic who forces the orphans to clean the building daily. With half of a locket as her only possession, Annie remains optimistic that her parents, who left her on the doorstep as a baby, will return for her. One evening, Annie sneaks out with help from laundry man, Mr. Bundles, adopting a stray dog which she names Sandy. However, she is escorted back to the orphanage by Officer Weasel.

Grace Farrell, secretary to billionaire Oliver Warbucks, arrives to invite an orphan to live with Warbucks for a week, to improve his public image. Annie is chosen and she and Sandy travel to Warbucks' mansion, meeting his many servants and two bodyguards, Punjab and the Asp. Warbucks, at first dismissive of Annie due to her being female, is charmed into letting her stay. He takes Annie and Grace to Radio City Music Hall to watch a movie, Camille, and Warbucks begins to develop affection for Annie. Grace urges him to adopt Annie and he meets with Miss Hannigan, convincing her to sign the adoption papers.

Warbucks reveals his plans to Annie, even offering her a new locket, but she declines. She explains the purpose of her broken locket and her hope that her parents will return with the other half. Warbucks appears on Bert Healy's radio show and offers $50,000 to find Annie's parents. This causes mass hysteria with many would-be parents appearing to claim the money. To escape the madness, Warbucks flies Annie to the White House in Washington, D.C., introducing her to President Franklin D. Roosevelt and his wife Eleanor. Roosevelt informs them of his plan to introduce a social welfare program to help America's impoverished and asks Warbucks to head it; Annie encourages him to help. Upon returning home, Annie is disheartened when Grace reveals none of the potential parents knew about the locket.

Hannigan is visited by her con artist brother Rooster and his girlfriend, Lily St. Regis; they plot to pose as Annie's parents to gain the reward. The trio searches the orphans' belongings and Hannigan reveals that Annie's real parents were killed in a fire when Annie was a baby. Hannigan herself possesses the other half of the locket. Annie's friends overhear the conversation and try sneaking out, but are discovered and locked away. Rooster and Lily succeed with the ruse, and Annie's departure from Warbucks is somber. She is kidnapped minutes after they leave the mansion, but her friends, having managed to escape, ultimately reach Warbucks and tell him the truth; shocked and stunned, he informs the police, beginning a city-wide search.

Annie convinces the felons to pull over only to escape and destroy Warbucks' check. Outraged, Rooster chases Annie up a raised drawbridge planning to kill her. Horrified by her brother's intentions, Hannigan desperately tries to stop him but he knocks her unconscious. Punjab arrives in a helicopter and rescues Annie. Rooster and Lily are arrested and Annie is adopted by Grace and Warbucks.

At a party that the orphans, a redeemed Hannigan, and the Roosevelts attend, Warbucks gives Annie the new locket as they embrace.

== Cast ==
- Aileen Quinn as Annie, a 10-year-old orphan girl. Quinn was chosen out of 9,000 girls who were interviewed at casting calls in the United States, Canada and Europe.
- Albert Finney as Oliver "Daddy" Warbucks, a billionaire businessman who adopts Annie and Molly. Sean Connery and Cary Grant were also considered for the role before Finney was chosen.
- Carol Burnett as Miss Agatha Hannigan, a cruel alcoholic proprietor of an all-girls orphanage where Annie and the other orphans live. She is shown to create bathtub gin and engage in other illegal activities such as child abuse. Bette Midler was considered for the role before Burnett was chosen.
- Ann Reinking as Grace Farrell, Warbucks's personal secretary and love interest.
- Tim Curry as Daniel Francis "Rooster" Hannigan, Miss Hannigan's sociopathic con-artist younger brother. Jack Nicholson, Mickey Rooney, Mick Jagger, and Steve Martin were considered for the role before Curry was chosen.
- Bernadette Peters as Lily St. Regis, a petty thief and co-conspirator girlfriend of "Rooster" Hannigan.
- Edward Herrmann as Franklin D. Roosevelt, the 32nd President of the United States, depicted as being in a wheelchair.
- Lois de Banzie as Eleanor Roosevelt, the First Lady of the United States.
- Geoffrey Holder as Punjab, Warbucks's turban-donning bodyguard.
- Roger Minami as The Asp, Warbucks's Japanese chauffeur and bodyguard who teaches Annie karate.
- Toni Ann Gisondi as Molly, a fellow orphan who is six years old.
- Rosanne Sorrentino as Pepper, a 14-year-old fellow orphan who commands others, but then becomes nicer.
- Lara Berk as Tessie, a fellow orphan who is eight years old and exclaims, "Oh my goodness!" throughout the film.
- April Lerman as Kate, an orphan who is thirteen years old, cares for the younger orphans, and often wears her hair in pigtail braids.
- Robin Ignico as Duffy, an eleven year old fellow orphan who is Pepper's best friend.
- Lucie Stewart as July, a fellow orphan who is nine years old and rarely speaks.
- Peter Marshall as Bert Healy, a prominent radio show host.
- Loni Ackerman, Murphy Cross, and Nancy Sinclair as the Boylan Sisters, who sing on the Bert Healy Show.
- Larry Hankin as the man from the dog pound.
- Irving Metzman as Mr. Bundles, a man who works for a Chinese laundry company, whose truck Annie stows away in. Mr. Bundles is implied to be a romantic interest of Miss Hannigan.
- Ken Swofford as Weasel, a greasy uniformed police officer who chases down Annie when she escapes and is implied to be a romantic interest of Miss Hannigan. He is based on Lt. Ward from the musical.
- I. M. Hobson as Drake, Warbucks's head butler who hides his allergy to dogs.
- Colleen Zenk and Pamela Blair as Cecille and Annette, Warbucks's French maids.
- Lu Leonard as Mrs. Pugh, Warbucks's cook.
- Mavis Ray as Mrs. Greer, Warbucks's housekeeper.
- The Rockettes as Themselves (uncredited).
- Bingo the dog as Sandy, a stray dog who becomes the family pet. (Note: Bingo was credited in the film as "Sandy as himself".)
- Angela Martin as Freda McKracky, a ventriloquist who performs with a dummy named Wacky.
- Kari Baca, Tina Maria Caspary, Jamie Flowers, Sonja Haney, Victoria Hartman, Janet Marie Jones, Lisa Kieldrup, Angela Lee, Jan Mackie, Liz Marsh, Martika, Cherie Michan, Danielle Miller, Barry Morse, Christi Nicholls, Tammy O'Rourke, Amanda Peterson, Carolyn Poppert, Meredith Salenger, Linda Saputo, Shawnee Smith, and Julie Whitman as orphans/backup dancers.

Director John Huston has a voice-over cameo on a radio program Miss Hannigan listens to. Ray Bolger plays a foley artist at a Bert Healy radio event.

== Production ==
Following the stage musical in 1977, the writers of the stage play asked $5 million for the rights and requested Mike Nichols to direct the film, After winning a bidding war with Paramount Pictures, Columbia purchased the rights to the Broadway musical for a record $9.5 million. Film producer Ray Stark wanted both John Huston and Joe Layton (while working as the director and choreographer, respectively) to also be the executive producers on the film, because it was too large an enterprise for one person. Regarding Huston being given the job of directing the first (and what would be the only) musical in his 40-year directing career, screenwriter Carol Sobieski stated: "Hiring John [Huston] is an outsider risk, and Ray's [Stark] a major gambler. He loves this kind of high risk situation." The film cost over $35 million, with some suggesting it cost as much as $59 million after marketing and distribution, making it one of the most expensive films at the time, and the most expensive project financed by Columbia Pictures up to that point.

=== Casting ===
Auditions for the title role took place all over the United States, Canada and Europe. Quinn was chosen out of 9,000 girls who were interviewed at casting calls. Among young hopefuls included Drew Barrymore, and Kristin Chenoweth, who would subsequently be cast in the role of Lily in the 1999 film. Sean Connery and Cary Grant were considered for the role of Oliver Warbucks, before Albert Finney was chosen. Bette Midler was considered for the role of Miss Hannigan, before Burnett was chosen. Jack Nicholson, Mickey Rooney, Mick Jagger, and Steve Martin were considered for the role of Rooster before Tim Curry was chosen.

=== Writing ===
Sobieski, who wrote the screenplay, introduced major differences between the stage musical and the film adaptation. In the stage musical, it is Christmas when Miss Agatha Hannigan, Rooster Hannigan and Lily St. Regis are caught at the Warbucks mansion by the United States Secret Service thus foiling their plan to kidnap Annie, while in the film (due to summertime shooting) Annie (Aileen Quinn) is kidnapped and on the eve of the Fourth of July, leading to Oliver Warbucks (Albert Finney) organizing a citywide search and a climactic ending on the Former Erie Railroad Bridge. Punjab and The Asp, Warbucks' servants/bodyguards from the original comic strip, appear in the film in supporting roles played by Geoffrey Holder and Roger Minami.

Miss Hannigan (Carol Burnett)'s redemption at the end in which she tries to save Annie from Rooster (Tim Curry) changed the usual ending of the musical to that date. In the stage musical, Miss Hannigan is always portrayed as fully aware that Rooster intends to kill Annie, and is arrested with Rooster and Lily at the end at Warbucks' mansion. In Thomas Meehan's 1980 novelization, Miss Hannigan shows no qualms whatsoever about Annie being killed.

The film also featured five new songs, "Dumb Dog", "Sandy", "Let's Go to the Movies", "Sign" and "We Got Annie", and cut "We'd Like to Thank You, Herbert Hoover", "N.Y.C", "You Won't Be an Orphan for Long", "Something Was Missing", "Annie" and "New Deal for Christmas". In addition, the song "Maybe" has two reprises whereas "Little Girls" and "Easy Street" do not.

Martin Charnin, the lyricist of Annie, was not impressed with the cinematic interpretation. In a 1996 interview, he dismissed the adaptation and its production. "The movie distorted what this musical was", Charnin reported. "And we were culpable for the reason that we did not exercise any kind of creative control because we sold the rights for a considerable amount of money." Charnin said that Huston, who had never directed a musical before, and producer Ray Stark made major changes in the film that destroyed the essence of Annie. Warbucks, "was an Englishman who screamed". Hannigan, as played by Burnett, was "a man-crazy drunk", and Annie was "cute-ed up". Worse, the emotional relationship between Annie and Warbucks was distorted. They even downplayed the hit song "Tomorrow" because "Stark thought it was corny".

=== Filming ===
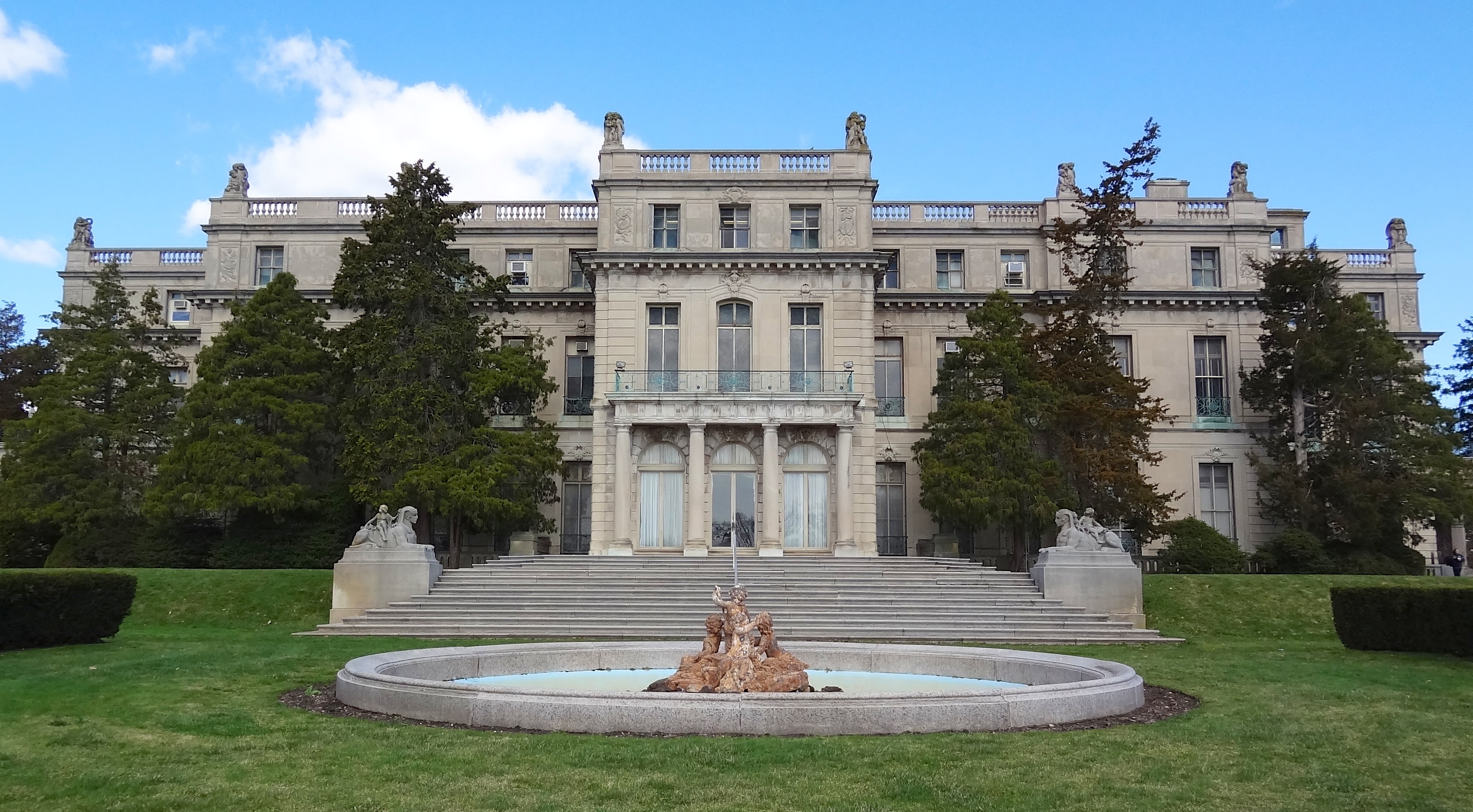
Wilson Hall, at Monmouth University campus, New Jersey, was used as the exteriors of Oliver Warbucks's mansion.

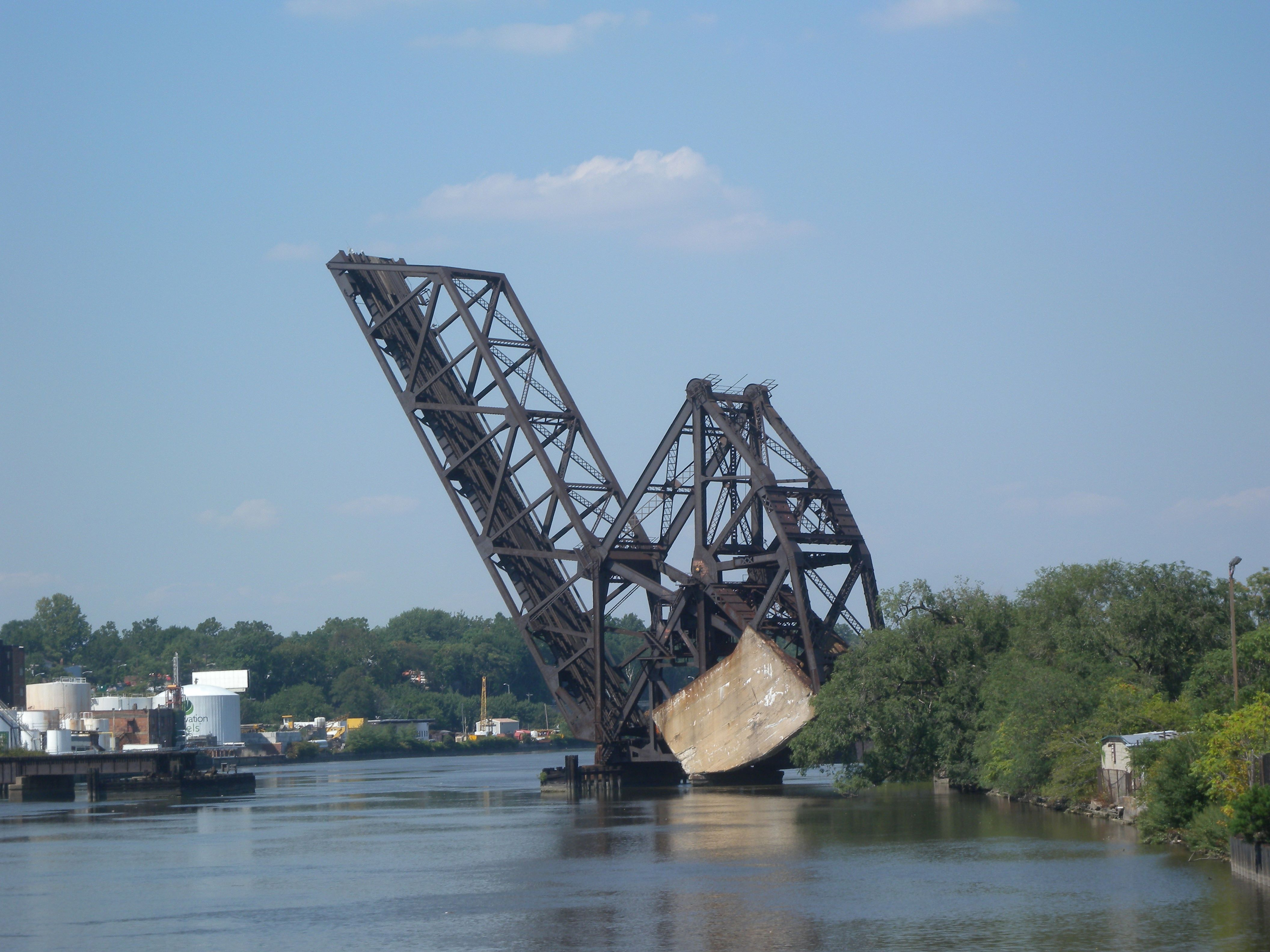
The NX Bridge over the Passaic River in New Jersey where the climax was filmed

Principal photography took place in 1981 over the course of six weeks at Monmouth College, now Monmouth University, in West Long Branch, New Jersey, which has two mansions that were used in the film, one of which is the Shadow Lawn Mansion. The NX Bridge, an abandoned railroad bridge over the Passaic River in Newark, was used for location shooting of one of the climactic scenes.

Many of the street sets were filmed at Warner Bros. Burbank Studios, 4000 Warner Boulevard, Burbank, California. Production designer Dale Hennesy overhauled the old "Tenement Street" back lot set at Warner Bros. by outfitting many of the New York styled apartment and store front facades with actual New York fire escapes and other treatments specifically brought in for this production. Hennesy died during filming and the back lot set was renamed "Hennesy Street" in honor of the late production designer.

Originally, the song "Easy Street" was going to be the biggest musical number in the film. For this purpose, a specially-created outdoor street set was built, costing more than $1 million. It took one week to shoot the scene, but on reviewing the dailies, the scene was considered to be "overstuffed" and "sour". Therefore, a re-shoot was undertaken nearly two months after principal filming had been completed. The scene was replaced with a version shot indoors in a style that mimicked the ambience portrayed in the original stage musical.

== Soundtrack ==
Annie

Soundtrack album from Annie by Various Artists
- Released: June 18, 1982
- Genre: Soundtrack
- Label: Columbia

Various Artists chronology
Annie (1982)	Annie (1999)

Annie is a soundtrack album for the 1982 film of the same name.

All lyrics are written by Martin Charnin; all music is composed by Charles Strouse.

No.	Title	Performed by	Length
1.	"Tomorrow"	Aileen Quinn and Orphans	1:37
2.	"Maybe"	Aileen Quinn	2:00
3.	"It's the Hard Knock Life"	Aileen Quinn, Toni Ann Gisondi and Chorus	3:42
4.	"Dumb Dog"	Aileen Quinn	0:54
5.	"Sandy"	Aileen Quinn and Orphans	2:02
6.	"I Think I'm Gonna Like It Here"	Aileen Quinn, Ann Reinking and Chorus	3:34
7.	"Little Girls"	Carol Burnett	3:36
8.	"Let's Go to the Movies"	Aileen Quinn, Ann Reinking, Albert Finney and Chorus	4:41
9.	"We Got Annie"	Ann Reinking, Lu Leonard, Geoffrey Holder and Roger Minami	2:22
10.	"Sign"	Carol Burnett and Albert Finney	2:51
11.	"You're Never Fully Dressed Without a Smile"	Peter Marshall, Chorus and Orphans	3:01
12.	"Tomorrow" (White House version)	Aileen Quinn, Albert Finney, Lois deBanzie and Edward Herrmann	2:24
13.	"Easy Street"	Carol Burnett, Tim Curry and Bernadette Peters	3:18
14.	"Maybe (Reprise)"	Aileen Quinn and Albert Finney	1:37
15.	"Finale: I Don't Need Anything but You / We Got Annie / Tomorrow"	Aileen Quinn, Albert Finney, Chorus and Orphans	4:37
Total length:			41:32

=== Charts ===
Chart (1982–83)	Peak position
Canada Top Albums/CDs (RPM)	35
Dutch Albums (Album Top 100)	14
New Zealand Albums (RMNZ)	48
UK Albums (Official Charts)	88
US Billboard 200	35

=== Certifications ===
Region	Certification	Certified units/sales
United States (RIAA)	Platinum	1,000,000^{^}
^{^} Shipments figures based on certification alone.

== Release ==
Annie opened theatrically on May 21, 1982, in 14 theatres, including in New York, Los Angeles, Dallas and Toronto. It expanded to 1,102 theatres on June 18, 1982.

== Reception ==
=== Critical response ===
Annie received mixed reviews upon its release. On Rotten Tomatoes, the film has an approval rating of 50% based on 38 reviews. The site's critical consensus reads, "John Huston proves an odd choice to direct, miring Annie in a sluggish, stagebound mess of an adaptation, but the kids are cute and the songs are memorable." On Metacritic the film has a weighted average score of 39 out of 100 based on 10 critics, indicating "generally unfavorable" reviews.

Roger Ebert gave the film three stars out of four and reported that Annie was "so rigorously machine-made, so relentlessly formula" that the film "is not about anything" despite its series of scenarios, but nonetheless "I sort of enjoyed the movie. I enjoyed the energy that was visible on the screen, and the sumptuousness of the production numbers, and the good humor of several of the performances -- especially those by Albert Finney, as Daddy Warbucks, and Carol Burnett, as the wicked orphanage supervisor, Miss Hannigan. Aileen Quinn sort of grew on me, too." Vincent Canby of The New York Times wrote, "Annie is far from a great film but, like the Music Hall in the good old days, it is immaculately maintained and almost knocks itself out trying to give the audience its money's worth. They don't build movies like this anymore." Variety wrote, "Whatever indefinable charm the stage show has is completely lost in this lumbering and largely uninteresting and uninvolving exercise, where the obvious waste reaches almost Pentagonian proportions." Gene Siskel of the Chicago Tribune gave the film two-and-a-half stars out of four and called it "a bit of a letdown", writing that Quinn "often comes across as one of those self-conscious stage kids" and that the four new songs "are not the least bit memorable", but Finney gives the best performance in the film as "he steadily turns into a quite wonderful father figure". Sheila Benson of the Los Angeles Times wrote that the film "staggers under monstrous production numbers, orphans doing gymnastic flips, dancing maids and butlers and the Radio City Music Hall complete with Rockettes ... But a kid with Annie's moxie deserves more. Or perhaps less. What she deserves is an atmosphere of innocence, warmth and inventiveness, to let the film generate the joy that must have enveloped theater audiences over the past five years." Gary Arnold of The Washington Post panned the film as "Overproduced and underinspired," with Burnett's performance "the closest thing to a saving grace". Pauline Kael wrote in The New Yorker that the story "cries out for a cockeyed fairy-tale tone" but instead "has the feel of a manufactured romp ... Every sequence seems to be trying too hard to be upbeat and irresistible, and it's all ungainly."

=== Box office ===
Annie grossed $5.3 million in its first wide weekend, ranking number 5 at the US box office. The film grossed $57 million in the United States and Canada against a budget of $35 million, making it the tenth highest-grossing film of 1982. However, due to its high cost, it failed to make a profit for Columbia Pictures upon release.

== Awards and nominations ==
Award	Category	Nominee(s)	Result	Ref.
Academy Awards	Best Art Direction	Art Direction: Dale Hennesy; Set Decoration: Marvin March	Nominated	
Academy Awards	Best Original Score	Ralph Burns	Nominated	
British Academy Film Awards	Best Original Song Written for a Film	"Tomorrow"; Music by Charles Strouse; Lyrics by Martin Charnin	Nominated	
Golden Globe Awards	Best Actress in a Motion Picture – Musical or Comedy	Carol Burnett	Nominated	
Golden Globe Awards	Best Actress in a Motion Picture – Musical or Comedy	Aileen Quinn	Nominated	
Golden Globe Awards	New Star of the Year – Actress	Aileen Quinn	Nominated	
Golden Raspberry Awards	Worst Picture	Ray Stark	Nominated	
Golden Raspberry Awards	Worst Director	John Huston	Nominated	
Golden Raspberry Awards	Worst Supporting Actress	Aileen Quinn	Won	
Golden Raspberry Awards	Worst Screenplay	Carol Sobieski; Based on the musical by Thomas Meehan; Based on the comic strip Little Orphan Annie by Harold Gray	Nominated	
Golden Raspberry Awards	Worst New Star	Aileen Quinn	Nominated	
Stinkers Bad Movie Awards	Worst Picture	Ray Stark	Nominated	
Young Artist Awards	Best Motion Picture – Animated, Music or Fantasy		Nominated	
Young Artist Awards	Best Young Motion Picture Actress	Aileen Quinn	Won	
Young Artist Awards	Best Young Supporting Actress in a Motion Picture	Toni Ann Gisondi	Nominated	

== Home media ==
The film was released on VHS, Betamax and CED Videodisc on November 5, 1982, by RCA/Columbia Pictures Home Video. It was re-issued in 1983, 1984, 1985, 1994, and 1997 (in a "Broadway Tribute Edition" to coincide with the original play's Broadway 20th anniversary revival that year). There were two widescreen LaserDiscs released, one in 1989 and another in 1994. The film was released in a widescreen DVD edition on December 12, 2000.

A "Special Anniversary Edition" DVD was released on January 13, 2004 (four days before producer Stark's death). It includes special features such as an exclusive musical performance of "The Hard Knock Life" by pop group Play, and activies including "The Age of Annie" trivia game, Sing Along with Annie!, and "Act Along With Annie!" as well as a featurette called "My Hollywood Adventure" with Aileen Quinn. Despite the fact that the first DVD was widescreen, the DVD was in pan and scan (but with DTS sound). Reviewing the disc for DVD Talk, Glenn Erickson, while praising the film overall, called the pan and scan transfer an "abomination that's grainy and lacking in color." He also noted that the short retrospective featurette with Quinn contained clips from the film in the correct aspect ratio. Erickson also called the music video of "It's the Hard Knock Life" by Play "pretty dreary" and attacked the other, child-oriented extras by saying "Musicals and kids' films aren't just for tots ... and this disc is little more than a headache." However, several countries in Region 2 received widescreen versions of this edition including the United Kingdom. The film was released as a "sing-along edition" on Blu-ray on October 2, 2012, in celebration of the 30th anniversary of the film and the 35th anniversary of the Broadway version set a revival in November 2012.

On October 25, 2022, the film was released on 4K Blu-ray as part of "Columbia Classics Collection: Volume 3," including the full 1932 film Little Orphan Annie and several new special features for the newly remastered Blu-ray.

== Television ==
The film had its national television debut on February 24, 1986, on the NBC Monday Night Movie. To accommodate the broadcast restrictions, the film was shown in pan-and-scan and had its running time cut from 128 minutes to 96 minutes to run in the two-hour time slot with commercials.

== Adaptations ==
=== Comic book adaptation ===
Marvel Comics published a comic book adaptation of the film by writer Tom DeFalco and artists Win Mortimer and Vince Colletta in Marvel Super Special #23 (Summer 1982). The adaptation was also available as an Annie Treasury Edition and as a limited series.

=== India ===
- The 1983 Malayalam movie Ente Mamattukkuttiyammakku was reported to be inspired by this movie.
- The 1993 Hindi film King Uncle, starring Jackie Shroff, Shah Rukh Khan, Anu Aggarwal and Nagma, is loosely based on this film.

=== Annie: A Royal Adventure! (1995) ===
A sequel, Annie: A Royal Adventure! was a made-for-television sequel that aired on ABC on November 18, 1995. It starred Ashley Johnson, Joan Collins, George Hearn and Ian McDiarmid. Aside from a reprise of "Tomorrow," there are no songs in it. No cast members from the 1982 film appeared in this sequel. Rooster, Lily and Grace Farrell were cut out of the sequel.

In the film, Warbucks (Hearn), Annie (Johnson), eccentric scientist Dr. Eli Eon (McDiarmid) and orphan Molly (Camilla Belle) travel to England where Warbucks is to be knighted by King George VI (Tim Seely). However, Annie and Molly get mixed up in the scheme of evil noblewoman Lady Edwina Hogbottom (Collins) to blow up Buckingham Palace while all the heirs to the throne are present for Warbucks' knighting, thus making her queen.

=== Annie (1999) ===
A made-for-TV movie version was broadcast on ABC on November 7, 1999, starring Kathy Bates as Miss Hannigan, Victor Garber as Daddy Warbucks, Alan Cumming as Rooster, Audra McDonald as Grace, Kristin Chenoweth as Lily, and newcomer Alicia Morton as Annie. Produced by The Walt Disney Company in association with Columbia TriStar Television, it received generally positive reviews and high ratings. It also earned two Emmy Awards and a 1999 George Foster Peabody Award. Although truer to the original stage musical than the 1982 version (as well as having a more comedic tone than the 1982 version's slightly dark one), it condensed much of the full story in order to make it more watchable for children. The film also featured a special appearance by Andrea McArdle, star of the original Broadway production.

The film has aired on cable on Hallmark Channel, ABC Family and Starz after its premiere on ABC.

=== Annie (2014 film) ===
Will Smith announced plans on January 20, 2011, to produce a contemporary remake of the 1982 film. Jay-Z was attached to the project on May 25, 2012, writing new songs for the film. Sony Pictures selected Will Gluck to direct the film in January 2013. Oscar nominee Quvenzhané Wallis was cast as the title character in February 2013. Released on December 19, 2014, and despite poor reviews by critics, the film was a commercial success, earning $133 million on a $65 million budget.

== See also ==
- John Huston filmography
