= Little Girls (Annie song) =

Song by Miss Hannigan from 1977, 1982, 1999, 2014

Song by Miss Hannigan
- Published: 1977
- Composers: Charles Strouse; Martin Charnin

"Little Girls" is a song from the musical Annie. It was originally performed by Dorothy Loudon as the cruel orphanage warden Miss Hannigan in the original cast of the show (1977). Other performances include those by Carol Burnett in the 1982 film of Annie, Kathy Bates in the 1999 made-for-tv version and Taraji P. Henson in the 2021 live TV version. A remixed version is performed by Cameron Diaz in her final acting role before 2021 as Miss Colleen Hannigan in the 2014 update of the musical.

The lyrics describe Hannigan's hatred of the parent-less children in her care, and by extension all children. She predicts that one day the stress will drive her to "wring little necks" and that her only relief may come if she is committed "in the nut-house, with all the nuts and the squirrels" until the "Prohibition of little girls".
