= Daddy Warbucks =

Fictional character from the comic strip Little Orphan Annie and Dick Tracy

Publication information
- Publisher: Tribune Media Services
- First appearance: New York Daily News, September 1924
- Created by: Harold Gray

In-story information
- Full name: Oliver Warbucks

Oliver "Daddy" Warbucks is a fictional business mogul character from the comic strip Little Orphan Annie. He made his first appearance in the New York Daily News in the Annie strip on September 27, 1924. In the series, he is said to be around 52 years of age.

== Fictional biography ==
=== Childhood ===
According to the strip's creator Harold Gray, Warbucks was born about 1894, near the fictional small town of Supine. (In Thomas Meehan's 1980 novelisation of his 1977 musical, he was born and brought up in the Hell's Kitchen neighborhood of Manhattan, and is 52 years old as of 1933, thus giving him a birthdate of 1881. In the 1982 film, he says he was born in Liverpool, England.) His father, a section boss on the railway, was killed when he was a month old. His mother was left with only "gumption" and a house in which she was able to keep boarders. His early youth in Supine involved cornering all the marbles in town at age nine, serving as a messenger for the telegraph company, having a girlfriend named Millie, fishing, swimming, and raiding melon patches with Spike Spangle and beating up the son of the banker who planned to foreclose on his mother's house. Then, on June 7, 1905, when he was 11, his mother died at age 30 of typhoid. He was put on the outbound Limited on the night of the funeral. Presumably, he later spent some time in the city, for he and Paddy Cairns were companions in the old 8th Ward.

For a few semesters he attended college, studying engineering, but found no time for football or girls because he had to work seven nights a week in the local steel mill to pay a debt. His family background and lack of prep school education kept him from entering a fraternity in his youth. But as an adult, Warbucks joined the Freemasons and went on to serve as Worshipful Master of a lodge.

=== Career, family, and pursuits ===
He eventually became a foreman in the rolling mill, married Mrs. Warbucks, and worked and planned for a family and house of their own. When "Daddy" began to make big money during World War I, the marital happiness was lost, but he retained his identity with the common people.

After the war, Warbucks continued as an industrialist but became a philanthropist as well—his fortune had built to "ten billion dollars". His wife instigated the taking in (no adoption ever took place) of Annie while Warbucks was away on a business trip. On his return, he was smitten with Annie and, as her father figure, offered the girl support as needed. He often intervened in Annie's life during crisis, always returning in time to save the day.

During World War II, Warbucks and his bodyguards Punjab and The Asp joined Allied forces. Warbucks became a three-star general.

He was knighted by the Queen of the United Kingdom later in life.

== Views ==
Warbucks was often a platform for cartoonist Harold Gray's political views, which were free market-based, opposing the New Deal policies of the Democrats. He sometimes expounded on the need for wealthy men to work hard—lest the masses have no employment. At the same time, capitalists who underpaid or mistreated their workers were portrayed negatively, with corrupt businessmen often being shown as villains. In 1944, Gray briefly killed off Warbucks because it was widely thought capitalists were obsolete. Warbucks was resurrected, however, after FDR's death.

His portrayal in the 1977 stage musical and subsequent film adaptations differs from this, showing him as an associate of Franklin Delano Roosevelt and embracing the New Deal. The musical (and Meehan's novelization of it) takes steps to reconcile this by explaining that Warbucks is a self-made, self-reliant millionaire who prides himself on never asking anyone for help. The depression was eating into his financial empire, and although still a long way from poverty, he was lobbying Roosevelt to take steps to resolve the Depression. Warbucks is fiercely adamant that even this does not constitute asking for help; he lobbies on the basis that "if I'm not making money then no one is." Warbucks is finally forced to abandon his stance and ask Roosevelt for help when he needs to rapidly disprove the "Ralph and Shirley Mudge" claim to be Annie's parents, which Roosevelt gives without reservation.

== Portrayals in media ==
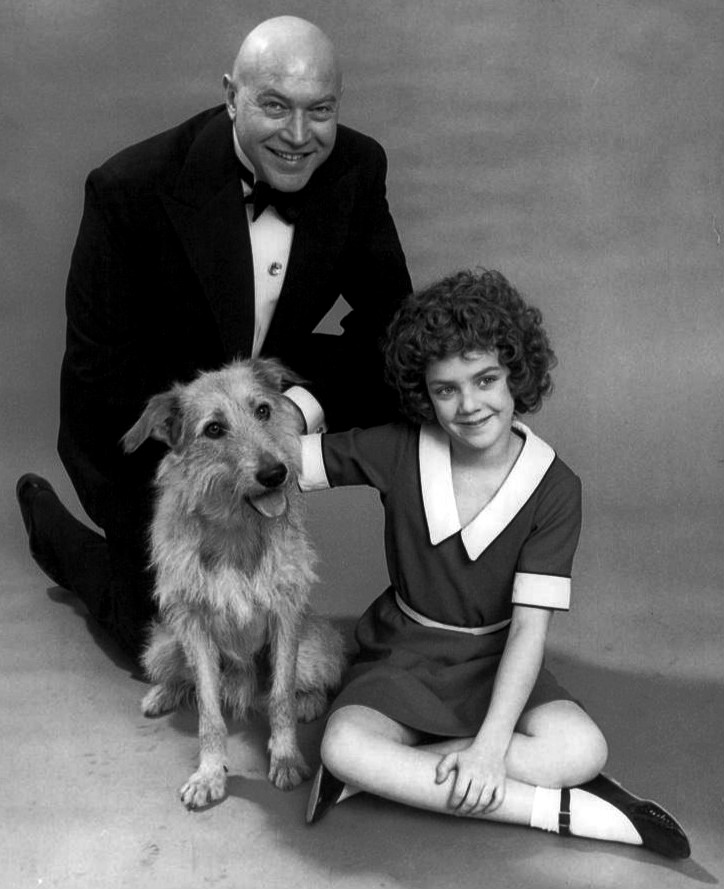
Reid Shelton as Warbucks with Andrea McArdle in the 1977 Broadway musical

- Film versions of the Annie story appeared in 1932 and 1938. In the 1932 version, Warbucks was portrayed by Edgar Kennedy; however, the 1938 version omits the character.
- Warbucks became more widely known via the 1977 musical Annie on Broadway. This was followed in 1982 by the musical film Annie, in which Daddy Warbucks was portrayed by Albert Finney, who had shaved his head to play the role.
- George Hearn also shaved his head when he played the role in the 1995 sequel Annie: A Royal Adventure!.
- In Disney's 1999 made-for-TV version, Warbucks is portrayed by Victor Garber; who, like Finney and Hearn, shaved his head to prepare for his role.
- In the 2014 film adaptation, Warbucks' name has been changed to Will Stacks, and he is portrayed by Jamie Foxx.
- Oliver Warbucks appears in the Robot Chicken episode "Tell My Mom", voiced by Seth MacFarlane. Stephen Stanton voices Oliver Warbucks in the episode "Maurice Was Caught" in the sketch "Annie's Super Sweet 16".
- In NBC's 2021 live musical, he was played by Harry Connick Jr.
