= Tomorrow (Annie song) =

1977 song from the musical Annie

Song by Andrea McArdle
- Published: 1977
- Genre: Pop, show tune
- Composer: Charles Strouse
- Lyricist: Martin Charnin

"Tomorrow"

Song by Aileen Quinn

from the album Annie (Original Motion Picture Soundtrack)
- B-side: "Let's Go To The Movies"
- Released: 1982
- Genre: Pop, show tune
- Length: 2:21
- Label: Columbia
- Composer: Charles Strouse
- Lyricist: Martin Charnin
- Producer: Ralph Burns

"Tomorrow" is a show tune from the musical Annie, with music by Charles Strouse and lyrics by Martin Charnin, published in 1977. The number was originally written as "Replay" (The Way We Live Now) for the 1970 short film Replay, with both music and lyrics by Strouse.

== Composition and lyrics ==
In 1972 Strouse, and Thomas Meehan began working on a musical based on the Little Orphan Annie comic strips, Annie. Strouse contributed a reworked version of "Replay" as "Tomorrow". "Annie" took until 1976 to reach Broadway and during that time Strouse reworked "Replay" again for possible use in what became "Charlie and Algernon", a musical version of Daniel Keyes's Flowers for Algernon with book by playwright David Rogers although it was not ultimately used.

The song has always been prominently featured in productions of the musical throughout its history: several variations of the song were performed in the original 1977 Broadway production, including being the show's finale. Its lyrics are repeated as a personal motto by the character of Annie in Thomas Meehan's 1980 novelisation. It was the entry and concluding credits score for the 1982 film adaptation; an a capella version of the song was performed by Aileen Quinn as Annie during the scene at the White House where Annie and Warbucks meet Franklin D. Roosevelt.

The song pronounces an optimistic view of life through its main themes and the phrases 'hang on until tomorrow' and 'when I'm stuck with a day that's gray and lonely, I just stick out my chin and grin [and say]'. It appears to be in unison with another song in the score, "You're Never Fully Dressed Without a Smile", which again pronounces the importance of smiling, though in a much lighter and cheerful tone.

== See also ==
- Little Orphan Annie
- Annie (musical)
- Annie (1982 film)
- Annie (2014 film)
