= Annie (2014 film) =

2014 film by Will Gluck

- Theatrical release poster
- Directed by: Will Gluck
- Screenplay by: Will Gluck; Aline Brosh McKenna
- Based on: Annie by; Charles Strouse; Martin Charnin; Thomas Meehan; Little Orphan Annie by Harold Gray
- Produced by: James Lassiter; Will Gluck; Jada Pinkett Smith; Will Smith; Caleeb Pinkett; Shawn "Jay-Z" Carter; Laurence "Jay" Brown; Tyran "Ty Ty" Smith
- Starring: Jamie Foxx; Quvenzhané Wallis; Rose Byrne; Bobby Cannavale; Adewale Akinnuoye-Agbaje; David Zayas; Cameron Diaz
- Cinematography: Michael Grady
- Edited by: Tia Nolan
- Music by: Charles Strouse (Note: The film features Strouse's original music as rearranged by Greg Kurstin and Sia.)
- Production companies: Columbia Pictures; Village Roadshow Pictures; Overbrook Entertainment; Marcy Media Films; Olive Bridge Entertainment
- Distributed by: Sony Pictures Releasing
- Release dates: December 7, 2014 (Ziegfeld Theatre); December 19, 2014 (United States)
- Running time: 118 minutes
- Country: United States
- Language: English
- Budget: $65–78 million
- Box office: $139.8 million

Annie is a 2014 American musical comedy drama film directed by Will Gluck, from a screenplay he co-wrote with Aline Brosh McKenna. Produced by Village Roadshow Pictures, Overbrook Entertainment, Marcy Media Films, and Olive Bridge Entertainment, and distributed by Sony Pictures Releasing through its Columbia Pictures label, it is a contemporary film adaptation of Charles Strouse, Martin Charnin, and Thomas Meehan's 1977 Broadway musical of the same name (which in turn is based on the comic strip Little Orphan Annie by Harold Gray). The film shifts the setting from the Great Depression to the present day and is the second remake and the third film adaptation of the musical, following the 1982 theatrical film starring Carol Burnett and Albert Finney, and the 1999 television film starring Kathy Bates and Victor Garber. The revival film stars Quvenzhané Wallis in the title role, alongside Jamie Foxx, Rose Byrne, Bobby Cannavale, and Cameron Diaz. Annie began production in August 2013 and, following its premiere at the Ziegfeld Theatre in New York City on December 7, 2014, it was released theatrically in the United States on December 19, 2014.

At the time of its release, the film received generally negative reviews from critics. It grossed $139 million against a budget of $65–78 million. Annie received two Golden Globe Award nominations in the categories of Best Actress in a Motion Picture – Comedy or Musical (for Wallis) and Best Original Song. Conversely, the film received two Golden Raspberry nominations and won in the category of Worst Prequel, Remake, Rip-off or Sequel while Diaz was nominated for the Golden Raspberry Award for Worst Supporting Actress. It was followed by a fourth adaptation of the musical that was a live NBC production.

== Plot ==
In Harlem, New York City, 10-year-old Annie Bennett lives in a foster home alongside four other girls - Pepper, Isabella, Tessie, and Mia – with Colleen Hannigan, an alcoholic former singer who spends her days trying to get a boyfriend and giving grueling chores to the children in her care. Every Friday, Annie waits outside of Italian restaurant Domani's, as a message on a Domani's receipt promised her parents will show up there. When a city inspector checks Colleen's apartment, Annie copies down her social security number. Hoping to find out more about herself, Annie receives what she already knows.

While trying to protect a stray dog from a group of bullies, Annie is nearly run over by a car but is saved by Will Stacks, a germaphobic cellphone mogul who is running for mayor. The incident is caught on camera and goes viral on the internet, boosting Will's popularity. Annie is persuaded by campaign manager Guy Danlily to move in with Will to continue his popularity boost. She becomes friends with Will's assistant Grace Farrell and adopts the stray dog she defended earlier, naming her Sandy. Will recalls his humble beginnings in Queens and realizes his affection for Grace.

At Annie's request, Will takes her and her friends to the premiere of Moon Quake Lake. Initially uninterested, Will becomes a fan along with Grace, and joins the premiere party. Annie shows Grace her Friday routine of waiting outside Domani's for her parents' return. Grace agrees to keep this secret from Will. Annie's friends accidentally wake Colleen who snaps at them, saying rich people are selfish and will abandon anyone they no longer care about. She laments her dislike of little girls and her desire to reclaim stardom.

Annie and Will fly around New York in a helicopter. Annie is invited to a charity event where she sings her gratitude for the opportunity she has been given. When Guy asks her to read a speech, Annie runs away as she cannot read (despite being 10 years old and attending school). Unbeknownst to Will, Guy plots with Colleen to have impostors claim Annie as their daughter as a publicity stunt for Will's campaign. Guy plans to put Annie back into foster care after the election and cut Colleen out of the deal.

When Will reveals the nice things Annie said about her, Colleen tells Will about Guy's scheme. Will confronts Guy and fires him, but Annie has already been kidnapped. Will, Grace, Colleen, Lou, and the girls board Will's helicopter and, aided by the police, chase the kidnappers' car. When Annie is rescued and the kidnappers arrested, Will announces his withdrawal from the mayoral race. Annie helps Grace and Will admit their love for each other and the three are broadcast on television as they dance and sing.

Annie announces the opening of the "Stacks Literacy Centre," to teach children to read. Everyone sings Annie's "Tomorrow" as the credits roll, and Will adopts Annie's four friends as well as Sandy.

== Cast ==
- Jamie Foxx as Mr. William "Will" Stacks, an entrepreneur in technology (particularly, the mobile phone industry) turned politician, who is trying to run for Mayor of New York City. The character is a modification of Oliver Warbucks.
- Quvenzhané Wallis as Annie Bennett-Stacks, an optimistic ten-year-old child living in foster care searching for her parents. Towards the end, she and her dog Sandy are adopted by Stacks.
- Cameron Diaz as Miss Colleen Hannigan, the cruel and drunk control freak who runs the foster home where Annie resides. She was a singer back in the 1990s but ended her career due to alcoholism. Miss Hannigan's first name is also changed to Colleen, instead of her previous film name, Agatha.
- Rose Byrne as Grace Farrell, Stacks' faithful personal assistant and love interest, as well as Annie's mother figure.
- Bobby Cannavale as Guy Danlily, a "bulldog political adviser" to Stacks. He convinces Stacks to let Annie live with him for the press at first, but later proves that he doesn't care for her well-being. His motives are partly based on Denis J. Dimple.
- Adewale Akinnuoye-Agbaje as Nash, "the tough but lovable bodyguard and driver for Will and a good friend of Annie." He evokes the traits of Punjab and The Asp.
- David Zayas as Lou, the local bodega owner who is a friend of Annie and becomes a love interest to Miss Hannigan. He evokes the traits of the laundryman Mr. Bundles.
- Stephanie Kurtzuba as Mrs. Kovacevic, the New York Family Services worker who becomes close with Annie's case.
- Amanda Troya as Pepper Ulster, the bossiest and second oldest foster girl. She is twelve-years-old and usually bitter towards Annie, but eventually comes around.
- Zoe Margaret Colletti as Tessie Marcus, the second youngest of the foster girls. She is ten-years-old and the same age as Annie.
- Eden Duncan-Smith as Isabella Sullivan, the oldest of all the foster girls. She is based on the characters July and Kate.
- Nicolette Pierini as Mia Putnam, the youngest of the foster girls. Her character is based on Molly and is seven-years-old.
- Peter Van Wagner as Harold Gray, the Mayor of New York City who Will is running against
- Marti as Sandy, Annie's dog. Sandy is a female Shiba Inu in this film, as opposed to the 1982 film adaptation where the dog is a male otterhound.

=== Cameos ===
- Patricia Clarkson as a Focus Group woman
- Michael J. Fox as himself
- Mila Kunis as Andrea Alvin, the lead actress in MoonQuake Lake
- Ashton Kutcher as Simon Goodspeed, the lead actor in MoonQuake Lake
- Bobby Moynihan as a guy in a bar who criticizes Will's singing and dancing following his withdrawal from the mayor election
- Rihanna as Moon Goddess, a supporting character in MoonQuake Lake
- Scarlett Benchley as Sakana, a supporting character in MoonQuake Lake who Will takes a liking to
- Sia as an Animal Care and Control volunteer
- Rachel Crowther as a Street Dancer

Although they had nothing to do with Annie, Phil Lord and Christopher Miller's names appear in the end credits of MoonQuake Lake, the fictional film within the film, as part of a long-running inside joke between the pair and director Will Gluck. Taylor Richardson, who played the title role in the 2012 Broadway revival of the musical, appears in the beginning of the film as one of Annie's classmates, also named "Annie". Dorian Missick and Tracie Thoms portray Annie's fake parents who were hired by Guy and evoke the traits of Rooster Hannigan and Lily St. Regis. Pat Kiernan cameos as an NY1 reporter.

== Musical numbers ==
While the film incorporates notable songs from the original Broadway production, written by composer Charles Strouse and lyricist Martin Charnin, the songs were rearranged by Sia and Greg Kurstin to reflect its new contemporary setting. Executive music supervisor Matt Sullivan explained that there was a desire to make the film's use of music "seamless" rather than "abrupt", and to maintain the integrity and familiarity of the musical's most iconic songs, including "Tomorrow" and "It's the Hard Knock Life". The songs were rearranged with a more percussive, pop-inspired style: in particular, "It's the Hard Knock Life" — whilst maintaining the use of "natural" sounds for its rhythm — was updated in a hip hop style. Lyrics to some songs were also updated to reflect differences in the film's storyline and settings. Sia and Kurstin wrote three new original songs for the soundtrack: "Opportunity", "Who Am I", and "MoonQuake Lake". Sia additionally co-wrote "The City's Yours" with Norwegian Stargate.

1. "Maybe" – Annie, Mia, Isabella, Tessie and Pepper
2. "It's the Hard Knock Life" – Annie, Mia, Isabella, Tessie and Pepper
3. "Tomorrow" – Annie
4. "I Think I'm Gonna Like It Here" – Annie, Grace and Mrs. Kovacevic
5. "Little Girls" – Miss Hannigan
6. "The City's Yours" – Stacks and Annie
7. "Opportunity" – Annie
8. "Easy Street" – Guy and Miss Hannigan
9. "Who Am I?" – Miss Hannigan, Stacks, and Annie
10. "I Don't Need Anything But You" – Stacks, Annie and Grace
11. "Tomorrow (Finale)" – Cast (Annie, Stacks, Grace, Miss Hannigan, Lou, Nash, Mrs. Kovacevic, Pepper, Mia, Tessie, Isabella, etc.)
12. "You're Never Fully Dressed Without a Smile" (end credits) – Sia

== Production ==
=== Development ===
Sony Pictures first announced the film in January 2011, with Jay-Z and Will Smith serving as producers and Smith's daughter, Willow Smith, attached to play the lead role. In February 2011, Glee co-creator Ryan Murphy became front-runner to direct the film, but by March, he had declined due to filming new episodes.

The production soon began seeking a screenwriter and actress Emma Thompson was considered. No developments arrived until May 2012, when Will Smith appeared on Good Morning America and provided updates, including that the film would be set in modern-day New York City, that Thompson was providing a script and that Jay-Z would also provide new songs for the film. In July 2012, We Bought a Zoo screenwriter Aline Brosh McKenna wrote a second draft of the script. In August, it was announced production was to begin in Spring 2013.

In January 2013, Easy A director Will Gluck was hired to direct but Willow Smith had aged out.

=== Casting ===
By February 2013, Beasts of the Southern Wild star and Oscar nominee Quvenzhané Wallis had replaced Smith in the lead role, and the film was given a Christmas 2014 release date.

In March 2013, the search for the rest of the cast continued and Justin Timberlake was rumored for the role of Daddy Warbucks. This was proven false when Jamie Foxx signed on for the role, which was renamed William "Will" Stacks. In June 2013, Cameron Diaz was cast as Miss Hannigan after Sandra Bullock declined.

In July 2013, Rose Byrne joined the cast as Grace Farrell, Stacks's faithful assistant and in August, Boardwalk Empire star and partner of Byrne, Bobby Cannavale joined the cast as a "bulldog political adviser" to Will Stacks. In September, the rest of the cast was announced: Amanda Troya, Nicolette Pierini, Eden Duncan-Smith, and Zoe Colletti as Annie's foster sisters.

As of September 19, 2013, principal photography had begun. Shooting was done at Grumman Studios. Other scenes were filmed at the new Four World Trade Center.

=== Writing ===
While "rooted in the same story" according to Gluck, this adaptation is a contemporary take on the 1977 Broadway musical and contains many differences from the original: The setting was changed from the 1930s – the era of Franklin D. Roosevelt's presidency and the Great Depression — to present-day New York City. The opening school scene features class presentations by both the new Annie and a student representing her classic appearance, discussing aspects of and parallels between the economic states of the two settings, such as the New Deal and the modern lower class.

While Hannigan is complicit in deceiving Stacks and Annie that Annie's birth parents have been found (conspiring with Stacks' campaign manager Guy Danlily), they are not impersonated by Hannigan's brother Rooster and his girlfriend Lily as in the original version. Instead, Guy has 'people he uses for this kind of work' take Annie. The fate of Annie's birth parents is left open, whereas in previous versions Hannigan reveals that they died sometime previously but Annie has not been told.

== Release ==
The film officially premiered at the Ziegfeld Theater in New York City on December 7, 2014.

=== Piracy ===
On November 27, 2014, Annie was one of several films leaked by the "Guardians of Peace", a group that the FBI believes has ties to North Korea, following its breach of Columbia's parent company Sony Pictures Entertainment. Within three days of the initial leak, Annie had been downloaded by an estimated 206,000 unique IPs. By December 9, the count had risen to over 316,000. The chief analyst at BoxOffice.com felt that despite this, the leak was unlikely to affect Annie's box office performance as the demographic who pirates movies is not the target audience for the film.

=== Home media ===
Annie was released on DVD and Blu-ray/DVD combo pack on March 17, 2015, by Sony Pictures Home Entertainment.

== Reception ==
=== Box office ===
Annie opened on December 19, 2014, and earned $5.3 million on its opening day. In the first weekend, the film made $15.9 million and ranked third in the North American box office behind other new releases The Hobbit: The Battle of the Five Armies and Night at the Museum: Secret of the Tomb. The film grossed $85.9 million in North America and $53.9 million overseas for a worldwide total of $139.8 million.

=== Critical response ===
On Rotten Tomatoes, the film has an approval rating of 28% based on 163 critic reviews, and an average rating of 4.48/10. The site's critical consensus reads, "The new-look Annie hints at a progressive take on a well-worn story, but smothers its likable cast under clichés, cloying cuteness, and a distasteful materialism." On Metacritic, the film has a score of 33 out of 100 based on 38 critics, indicating "generally unfavorable" reviews. Audiences polled by CinemaScore gave the film an average grade of "A−" on an A+ to F scale.

PopMatters magazine rated Annie with a three out of ten, saying, "In its aggravatingly choreographed frenzy, the party scene epitomizes Annie: it's trying too hard both to be and not be the previous Annies, it's trying too little to be innovative or vaguely inspired. It's as crass as Miss Hannigan and as greedy as Stacks, at least until they learn their lessons. The movie doesn't appear to learn a thing." Michael Phillips of the Chicago Tribune gave Annie one-and-a-half stars, describing the adaptation as being "wobbly" and "unsatisfying", criticizing the commercialized nature of the plot changes, concluding that it was "finesse-free and perilously low on the simple performance pleasures we look for in any musical, of any period." Ben Sachs of the Chicago Reader gave the film three out of four stars, praising the "surprising amount of bite: the filmmakers openly acknowledge the similarities between the Great Depression and the present, and the populist message, however overstated, always registers as sincere." Sachs also praised director Will Gluck for "striking a buoyant tone that feels closer to classic Hollywood musicals than contemporary kiddie fare."

The soundtrack, rearranged by Sia Furler and Greg Kurstin, received a polarizing response from critics, with much criticism going towards the heavy use of auto-tune. Entertainment Weekly described its soundtrack as an auto-tuned "disaster," noting that "you won't ever hear a worse rendition of 'Easy Street' than the one performed by Diaz and Cannivale — I promise." David Rooney of The Hollywood Reporter says "all but a handful of the existing songs have been shredded, often retaining just a signature line or two and drowning it in desperately hip polyrhythmic sounds, aurally assaultive arrangements and inane new lyrics." Matt Zoller Seitz however, praised the soundtrack's new songs.

The performances were more positively received by some critics. IGN.com praised Wallis and Foxx for being "on-point" throughout much of the film, as well as Rose Byrne, calling her the "surprise" of the film. Matt Zoller Seitz called Wallis "the first Annie to bring something both culturally and personally new to this role," and praised the rest of the cast too, including Foxx and Byrne. Cameron Diaz's performance received polarized reviews, with critics praising her effort, but ultimately calling it too "vampy," as well as "strident and obnoxious." Peter Travers of Rolling Stone says that she "overacts the role to the point of hysteria."

=== Accolades ===
| Award | Category | Recipient | Result | Ref. |
|---|---|---|---|---|
| Alliance of Women Film Journalists / EDA Special Mention Award | Actress Most in Need of a New Agent | Cameron Diaz; For Annie, The Other Woman and Sex Tape | Won | |
| BET Awards | Best Movie | | Nominated | |
| Black Reel Awards | Outstanding Actress | Quvenzhané Wallis | Nominated | |
| Critics' Choice Awards | Best Young Actor/Actress | Quvenzhané Wallis | Nominated | |
| Dorian Awards | Campy Flick of the Year | | Nominated | |
| Golden Globe Awards | Best Actress in a Motion Picture – Musical or Comedy | Quvenzhané Wallis | Nominated | |
| Golden Globe Awards | Best Original Song – Motion Picture | "Opportunity"; Music by Sia Furler and Greg Kurstin; Lyrics by Will Gluck | Nominated | |
| Golden Raspberry Awards | Worst Prequel, Remake, Rip-off or Sequel | | Won | |
| Golden Raspberry Awards | Worst Supporting Actress | Cameron Diaz | Nominated | |
| Golden Reel Awards | Best Sound Editing – Music in a Musical Feature Film | Jon Wakeham, Lisa Jaime and Sherry Whitfield | Nominated | |
| Golden Trailer Awards | Best Animation/Family | | Nominated | |
| Golden Trailer Awards | Best Viral Campaign | | Nominated | |
| Guild of Music Supervisors Awards | Best Music Supervision for Films Budgeted Over $25 Million | Matt Sullivan and Wende Crowley | Nominated | |
| NAACP Image Awards | Outstanding Actress in a Motion Picture | Quvenzhané Wallis | Nominated | |
| National Film Awards UK | Best Actress | Quvenzhané Wallis | Nominated | |
| National Film Awards UK | Best Breakthrough Performance | Jamie Foxx | Nominated | |
| National Film Awards UK | Best Newcomer | Quvenzhané Wallis | Nominated | |
| Nickelodeon Kids' Choice Awards | Favorite Movie Actress | Cameron Diaz | Nominated | |
| Nickelodeon Kids' Choice Awards | Favorite Villain | Cameron Diaz | Nominated | |
| Women Film Critics Circle Awards | Best Young Actress | Quvenzhané Wallis | Nominated | |
| Young Artist Awards | Best Performance in a Feature Film – Leading Young Actress | Quvenzhané Wallis | Won | |
