= Roger Minami =

American dancer and choreographer

- Born: June 16, 1945 (age 81); Hawaii, United States
- Occupations: Dancer; Choreographer
- Years active: mid-1960s–1996
- Notable work: The Act (Broadway, 1977); Annie (film, 1982); Takarazuka Revue Glitter, With Gusto (1989)

Roger Minami (born 16 June 1945) is an American dancer and choreographer.

== Early life ==
Minami was born in Honolulu towards the tail end of the Second World War. He is a third-generation American of Japanese descent. He attended Long Beach State University. Before finding success as a dancer, Minami worked as a soda jerk at C.C. Brown's.

== Career ==
In the mid-1960s Minami was one of several resident dancers on the US variety show Where the Action Is, collectively dubbed The Action Kids. In 1969 he appeared with Ann-Margret on her television special From Hollywood With Love and choreographed another special for Frank Sinatra, Jr..

From 1970 Minami became an established presence in Las Vegas revues, winning multiple awards for his role in Bare Touch of Vegas at The Stardust Hotel.

In 1977 Minami received a breakout role onstage as Arthur in The Act, starring Liza Minnelli. Minami joined the show in Los Angeles during its out of town tryout and stayed with the show when it transferred to Broadway. In New York he received significant notice and the New York Times highlighted him in its guide to young talent for the year. He continued to tour and collaborate with Minnelli, appearing with her at Carnegie Hall and in her 1980 HBO special Standing Room Only.

John Huston's 1982 screen adaptation of the musical Annie featured Minami as the Asp, and Minami contributed choreography to the film as well.

Minami's later career was focused largely on choreography. He served as choreographer for the 1983 film Spring Break as well as appearing in the picture. In 1988 he traveled to Japan, and the following year was one of several choreographers for the Takarazuka Revue Company show Glitter, With Gusto at Radio City Music Hall. Through the mid-1990s Minami produced shows for Merv Griffin's Atlantic City ventures.

== Later life ==
Minami retired from entertainment in 1996 and took up a new career as a painter.
