= Annie (1999 film soundtrack) =

Soundtrack album from Annie by Various Artists
- Released: November 2, 1999
- Genre: Soundtrack
- Label: Sony Classical

Annie is a soundtrack album for the 1999 film of the same name.

== Track listing ==
1. "Overture / Main Titles" – Instrumental
2. "Maybe" – Alicia Morton
3. "The Hard Knock Life" – Alicia Morton, Orphans
4. "The Hard Knock Life" (Reprise) – Orphans
5. "Tomorrow" – Alicia Morton
6. "Little Girls" – Kathy Bates
7. "I Think I'm Gonna Like It Here" – Audra McDonald, Alicia Morton and Company
8. "NYC" – Victor Garber, Audra McDonald, Alicia Morton, and Star-to-Be
9. "NYC (Reprise) / Lullaby" – Victor Garber
10. "Easy Street" – Alan Cumming, Kathy Bates, and Kristin Chenoweth
11. "You're Never Fully Dressed Without a Smile" (Radio Version) – Bert Healy and the Boylan Sisters
12. "You're Never Fully Dressed Without a Smile" (Cast Version) – Orphans
13. "Something Was Missing" – Victor Garber
14. "I Don't Need Anything But You" – Victor Garber and Alicia Morton
15. "Maybe / Tomorrow" (Reprise) – Audra McDonald
16. "Little Girls" (Reprise) – Kathy Bates
17. "Finale: I Don't Need Anything But You" – Victor Garber, Audra McDonald, and Alicia Morton

== Reception ==
A review in The Atlantic Constitution said, "this Disney version sounds as bouncy as an orphan high on sugar". While giving the album a "B", critic Kathy Janic said, "The delight here is Cumming, who in one song ('Easy Street'), plays Rooster as a wicked, wily, oily, blockheaded and endearing scamp."

The Washington Post said that the 1999 film featured "a safe recasting", noting, "The whole thing feels a little smoothed out – dare we say Disneyfied? – and it's hard to hear 'The Hard-Knock Life' these days without Jay-Z's urban input."
