= Annie (1999 film) =

1999 American television film by Rob Marshall

- DVD cover
- Based on: Annie by; Charles Strouse; Martin Charnin; Thomas Meehan; Little Orphan Annie by Harold Gray
- Teleplay by: Irene Mecchi
- Directed by: Rob Marshall
- Starring: Alicia Morton; Kathy Bates; Alan Cumming; Audra McDonald; Kristin Chenoweth; Victor Garber
- Composers: Score: Danny Troob; Songs: Charles Strouse (music); Martin Charnin (lyrics)
- Country of origin: United States
- Original language: English

Production
- Executive producers: Chris Montan; Craig Zadan; Neil Meron
- Producer: John Whitman
- Cinematography: Ralf Bode
- Editor: Scott Vickrey
- Running time: 90 minutes
- Production companies: Chris Montan Productions; Storyline Entertainment; Columbia TriStar Television; Walt Disney Television

Original release
- Network: ABC
- Release: November 7, 1999

Annie is a 1999 American musical comedy drama television film from The Wonderful World of Disney, adapted from the 1977 Broadway musical of the same name by Charles Strouse, Martin Charnin, and Thomas Meehan, which in turn is based on the 1924 Little Orphan Annie comic strip by Harold Gray. It is the first remake and the second film adaptation of the musical following the 1982 theatrical film starring Aileen Quinn, Carol Burnett, and Albert Finney.

It was directed by Rob Marshall, written by Irene Mecchi, and produced by Chris Montan Productions, Storyline Entertainment, Columbia TriStar Television, and Walt Disney Television. It stars Kathy Bates, Alan Cumming, Audra McDonald, Kristin Chenoweth, Victor Garber, Andrea McArdle, and introducing Alicia Morton in her film debut as the titular character with supporting roles by Lalaine, Danielle Wilson, Sarah Hyland, Erin Adams, Nanea Miyata, and Marissa Rago.

Annie premiered on ABC on November 7, 1999. The program proved to be popular during its initial airing, with an estimated 26.3 million viewers, making it the second-most-watched Disney film ever to air on ABC behind Cinderella (1997). This version earned two Emmy Awards and a George Foster Peabody Award. It would be followed by a third film adaptation of the musical in 2014 and a fourth adaptation that was a live NBC production of the musical.

== Plot ==
In 1933, during the Great Depression, 11-year-old Annie Bennett has been on her own at the NYC Municipal Orphanage Girls Annex ever since she was an infant. The only two things she has from her biological family are half a heart-shaped locket with a key hole and a note from her parents, which promises they would come back for her. The orphanage is run by the tyrannical Miss Agatha "Aggie" Hannigan, who starves the orphans and forces them to do child labor in order to help them gain work experience until she ultimately releases them by giving them various jobs in New York City once they reach adulthood. In the middle of the night, after getting tired of waiting for her parents, Annie tries to escape to find them, but is caught by Aggie in the process. When Aggie gets distracted, Annie hides in the dirty laundry bin and finally succeeds in running away.

While out on her own, Annie befriends a dog, whom she names Sandy, but police officer L.T. Ward catches her and returns her to the orphanage, where Aggie punishes Annie with extra chores. When billionaire Oliver Warbucks decides to take in an orphan for Christmas, his secretary Grace Farrell chooses Annie. Annie and Sandy are brought to his wealthy estate and bathe in a grand life.

Although at first uncomfortable with Annie, Warbucks is soon charmed by her. He desperately wants to adopt Annie, but she still wants to find her real parents, so he announces on the radio a $50,000 reward for anybody who can find or prove they are her parents. The orphans accidentally tell Aggie, causing her to hire her younger con artist brother, Rooster, and his dimwitted girlfriend, Lily St. Regis, to get the reward for her by posing as Ralph and Shirley Mudge; Rooster intends to kill Annie after they have collected her.

Lily is left with the orphans after Aggie and Rooster, disguised as Ralph and Shirley Mudge, leave, but she accidentally tells the secret. The orphans make her tell them what is going on, and she realizes that Rooster could leave her hanging as he has done before. She and the orphans arrive at Warbucks' mansion, where Lily demands her part in the cut while the orphans shout, "We love you, Miss Hannigan!" While fleeing from the orphans, Aggie and Rooster are intercepted upon the arrival of President Franklin D. Roosevelt along with his Secret Service. President Roosevelt reads the papers that identify Aggie, Rooster, and Lily, leading to Rooster and Lily getting arrested by the Secret Service. When Aggie claims that Rooster made her do it and begs Annie to tell them how good she was to her, she reminds her that she taught her never to lie. This enrages Aggie, who blames Annie for driving her to working with Rooster, so much that she goes insane and is carted off to a psychiatric hospital.

With Annie and her fellow orphans thrilled that Aggie is gone forever, President Roosevelt presents evidence that Annie's real parents were David and Margaret Bennett, who died when she was still a baby, which explains why they never returned for her. Although Annie is saddened that her parents are dead, she is cheered up with the knowledge that they did love her, while Warbucks officially adopts her. President Roosevelt ensures a happy ending for all as he promises that each of the other orphans will be adopted by a stable and happy family. Warbucks and Grace become engaged, and Annie lives happily with her new parents and Sandy.

== Cast ==
- Alicia Morton as Annie Bennett-Warbucks, an optimistic 11-year old orphan, searching for her biological parents, then later gets adopted by Warbucks and Grace.
- Kathy Bates as Miss Agatha "Aggie" Hannigan, the cruel owner of the orphanage where Annie formerly lives, and Rooster's sister.
- Victor Garber as Oliver "Daddy" Warbucks, a lonely billionaire businessman who opens his heart to Annie and becomes her adoptive father.
- Alan Cumming as Daniel Francis "Rooster" Hannigan, a known con-artist, and Aggie's brother
- Audra McDonald as Grace Farrell, Personal Secretary (later wife) to Daddy Warbucks. She eventually falls in love with Daddy Warbucks and becomes Annie's adoptive mother.
- Kristin Chenoweth as Lily St. Regis, Rooster's girlfriend.
- Erin Adams as Tessie, the 8-year-old orphan with mood swings. Tessie goes from being happy one minute to worrisome the next.
- Sarah Hyland as Molly, the youngest of the orphans. Molly is 7 years old and has a cute doll. In the end, she also gets adopted by Oliver Warbucks and becomes the little sister of Annie.
- Lalaine as Katherine "Kate", the tomboyish Mexican-American orphan who is friends with Annie. Kate is a shy 11-year-old who wears glasses.
- Nanea Miyata as July, the oldest orphan at age 13. She is motherly to the other orphans and has a doll too.
- Marissa Rago as Pepper, the second oldest orphan at 12 years old. She is bossy and thinks that she's too old to be adopted.
- Danielle Wilson as Duffy, the loud and confident 10-year-old African American orphan with a talent for singing. She dreams of being famous.
- Andrea McArdle as Star-To-Be (McArdle created the role of Annie in the stage musical)
- Dennis Howard as Franklin D. Roosevelt, the President of the United States.
- Douglas Fisher as Drake
- Kurt Knudson as Justice Brandeis
- Ernie Sabella as Mr. Bundles, the laundry man.
- Chester and Chip as Sandy, a stray dog who Annie adopts.
- Vic Polizos as Lt. Ward (credited as "Beat Cop"), a police lieutenant who returns Annie to Aggie.

== Musical numbers ==
The film's soundtrack was released on November 2, 1999, by Sony Classical.

The songs in this version reflect those of the original 1977 production, but does not include "We'd Like to Thank You, Herbert Hoover", "Tomorrow (Cabinet Reprise)", "Annie", or "New Deal for Christmas". However, it does include a reprise of "N.Y.C." and of "Little Girls" that takes place at the end of the film, rather than after the song itself.

1. "Overture"
2. "Maybe" - Annie
3. "It's the Hard Knock Life" - Annie and Orphans
4. "It's the Hard Knock Life" (Reprise) - Orphans
5. "Tomorrow" - Annie
6. "Little Girls" - Miss Hannigan
7. "I Think I'm Gonna Like It Here" - Grace, Annie, and Warbucks' Staff
8. "N.Y.C." - Warbucks, Grace, Annie, and Star-to-Be
9. "N.Y.C." (Reprise) - Warbucks
10. "Lullaby" - Warbucks
11. "Easy Street" - Rooster, Miss Hannigan, and Lily
12. "Maybe" (Reprise 1) - Annie
13. "You're Never Fully Dressed Without a Smile" - Bert Healy and the Boylan Sisters
14. "You're Never Fully Dressed Without a Smile" (Reprise) - Orphans
15. "Something Was Missing" - Warbucks
16. "I Don't Need Anything But You" - Warbucks and Annie
17. "Maybe" (Reprise 2) - Grace
18. "Tomorrow" (Reprise) - Grace
19. "Little Girls" (Reprise) - Miss Hannigan
20. "Finale: I Don't Need Anything But You" (Reprise) - Warbucks, Grace, and Annie

== Production ==
ABC began work on the film following the success of Cinderella. Although the stage musical, Annie, had already been adapted as a film in 1982, the film was considered to be a critical and commercial failure. Zadan and Meron saw remaking the musical as an opportunity to rectify the previous adaptation's errors. They enlisted Cinderella's choreographer Rob Marshall to direct and made the orphans ethnically diverse. Zadan and Meron were both so impressed by Marshall's work throughout Cinderella (saying he acted like a director) that they both asked Marshall to direct and choreograph. At first he turned it down, saying, "I'm not a director, I'm a choreographer. I don't know why you're even offering me this movie." Then Zadan and Meron asked if he ever thought about directing a movie, to which he then said, "No. I don't know anything about film." After long discussions, Marshall finally agreed to direct it, but Disney executives didn't want him. They said, "Annie is too valuable a property. We're not gonna give it to a guy who's never directed a movie." Yet, because Zadan and Meron both really believed in him, they told the executives for weeks that they wouldn't produce it. They knew that since Cinderella was so successful, the last thing Disney wanted to do was make another musical not produced by them. So they kept calling, saying, "Let's go over a list of directors," but Zadan and Meron kept saying, "no," because they really wanted Rob Marshall to do it. Disney eventually conceded and allowed him to direct and choreograph. Filming began in June 1999 and took place entirely on location in Los Angeles.

When it came to casting Lily St. Regis, the network wanted Ginger Spice to play the part. Yet, it was Rob Marshall who successfully fought for Kristin Chenoweth despite her mainly being a Broadway name at the time.

McDonald recalled in a 2017 interview that there was a reshoot of the final scene that showed her character, a black woman, getting engaged to Daddy Warbucks; she suggested the reason for the reshoots was that Disney and ABC were "a little uncomfortable" having a black woman being engaged to a white man. However, the other members of the cast and crew were not happy about having to do the reshoot, and Garber intentionally performed the scene badly so that it couldn't make it into the final cut.

The dancers' costumes and the stage set of the Broadway section of "N.Y.C." are taken directly from the "Broadway Melody" ballet in Singin' in the Rain.

This was the second time Kathy Bates and Victor Garber starred alongside each other in a film. They had previously appeared in James Cameron's 1997 disaster epic film Titanic.

== Release ==
Annie premiered as part of The Wonderful World of Disney on ABC on November 7, 1999. After its premiere on ABC, the film aired on cable channels such as ABC Family, Starz, and the Hallmark Channel.

=== Home media ===
Annie was released on VHS on December 14, 1999 and on DVD on January 24, 2000 by Buena Vista Home Entertainment. The film has not been released on Blu-ray but was available to stream on Disney+ for a limited time.

== Reception ==
=== Critical response ===
This film received positive reviews from critics, with praise going toward its casting and for being closer to the stage production than the 1982 film.

=== Ratings ===
The program proved to be popular during its initial airing, with an estimated 26.3 million viewers, making it the second-most-watched Disney movie ever to air on ABC behind Cinderella (1997). It was also the second most-watched program during the week of its premiere, behind the television series E.R. on NBC.

=== Accolades ===
Year	Award	Category	Nominee(s)	Result	Ref.
1999	Peabody Awards		ABC, Storyline Entertainment, Columbia TriStar Television Inc., and Chris Montan Productions, in association with Walt Disney Television	Won	
2000	American Choreography Awards	Outstanding Achievement in Television – Variety or Special	Rob Marshall	Won	
2000	American Comedy Awards	Funniest Female Performer in a TV Special – Network, Cable or Syndication	Kathy Bates	Won	
2000	Art Directors Guild Awards	Excellence in Production Design Award – Variety or Awards Show, Music Special or Documentary	Stephen Hendrickson and Edward L. Rubin	Nominated	
2000	Artios Awards	Best Casting for TV Movie of the Week	Valorie Massalas and Rosalie Joseph	Nominated	
2000	Cinema Audio Society Awards	Outstanding Achievement in Sound Mixing for Television – Non-Fiction, Variety or Music Series or Specials	Terry O'Bright, Keith Rogers, and Edward L. Moskowitz	Nominated	
2000	Costume Designers Guild Awards	Excellence in Period/Fantasy for Television	Shay Cunliffe	Won	
2000	Directors Guild of America Awards	Outstanding Directorial Achievement in Musical/Variety	Rob Marshall	Nominated	
2000	Golden Globe Awards	Best Supporting Actress – Series, Miniseries or Television Film	Kathy Bates	Nominated	
2000	Make-Up Artists and Hair Stylists Guild Awards	Best Period Hair Styling – Television (for a Mini-Series or Movie of the Week)	Matthew Kasten, Natasha Ladek, and Mishell Chandler	Nominated	
2000	Online Film & Television Association Awards	Best Motion Picture Made for Television		Nominated	
2000	Online Film & Television Association Awards	Best Supporting Actress in a Motion Picture or Miniseries	Kathy Bates	Won	
2000	Online Film & Television Association Awards	Best Makeup/Hairstyling in a Non-Series		Nominated	
2000	Primetime Emmy Awards	Outstanding Television Movie	Craig Zadan, Neil Meron, Chris Montan, Marykay Powell, and John Whitman	Nominated	
2000	Primetime Emmy Awards	Outstanding Supporting Actress in a Miniseries or Movie	Kathy Bates	Nominated	
2000	Primetime Emmy Awards	Outstanding Directing for a Miniseries or Movie	Rob Marshall	Nominated	
2000	Primetime Emmy Awards	Outstanding Art Direction for a Miniseries or Movie	Stephen Hendrickson, Edward L. Rubin, and Archie D'Amico	Nominated	
2000	Primetime Emmy Awards	Outstanding Casting for a Miniseries or Movie	Marcia Turner, Rosalie Joseph, and Valorie Massalas	Nominated	
2000	Primetime Emmy Awards	Outstanding Choreography	Rob Marshall	Won	
2000	Primetime Emmy Awards	Outstanding Cinematography for a Miniseries or Movie	Ralf D. Bode	Nominated	
2000	Primetime Emmy Awards	Outstanding Costumes for a Miniseries, Movie or Special	Shay Cunliffe and Patricia McLaughlin	Nominated	
2000	Primetime Emmy Awards	Outstanding Hairstyling for a Miniseries or Movie	Matthew Kasten, Mishell Chandler, and Natasha Ladek	Nominated	
2000	Primetime Emmy Awards	Outstanding Music Direction	Paul Bogaev	Won	
2000	Primetime Emmy Awards	Outstanding Picture Editing for a Miniseries or Movie	Scott Vickrey	Nominated	
2000	Primetime Emmy Awards	Outstanding Sound Mixing for a Miniseries or Movie	Edward L. Moskowitz, Terry O'Bright, and Keith Rogers	Nominated	
2000	Satellite Awards	Best Actress – Miniseries or TV Film	Kathy Bates	Nominated	
2000	Screen Actors Guild Awards	Outstanding Performance by a Female Actor in a Miniseries or Television Movie	Kathy Bates	Nominated	
2000	TCA Awards	Outstanding Achievement in Movies, Miniseries and Specials		Nominated	
2000	TV Guide Awards	Favorite TV Movie or Miniseries		Won	
2000	Young Artist Awards	Best Family TV Movie or Pilot: Network		Nominated	
2000	Young Artist Awards	Best Performance in a TV Movie or Pilot: Leading Young Actress	Alicia Morton	Nominated	
2000	Young Artist Awards	Best Performance in a Feature Film or TV Movie: Young Ensemble	Erin Adams, Sarah Hyland, Lalaine, Alicia Morton, Nanea Miyata, Marissa Rago, and Danelle Wilson	Nominated	
2000	YoungStar Awards	Best Young Actress/Performance in a Miniseries/Made for TV Film	Alicia Morton	Won	

== See also ==
- Annie Jr. - School and amateur productions of Annie.
- Annie (1982 film)
- Annie (2014 film) - Modernized re-imagining loosely based on the same story
- Annie (musical) - The musical which the films are based on.
- Little Orphan Annie - The Harold Gray comic strip from which the whole Annie universe is based.
