= Theatre Zone =

- Formation: 2005
- Type: Theatre group
- Location: Naples, Florida
- Website: www.theatrezone-florida.com

TheatreZone is a Professional Equity Theatre Company located in Naples, Florida. It performs in residence at The Community School of Naples at 13275 Livingston Road.

== History ==
TheatreZone was founded in 2005 as non-profit 501(c)3 corporation, by Mark and Karen Danni. The company then obtained a Small Professional Theatres Contract with the Actors' Equity Association. TheatreZone's inaugural season opened with the musical Mack and Mabel on March 16, 2006. The production starred Gary Sandy, most famous for his role on the 1970s and early 80's CBS Sitcom WKRP in Cincinnati. The show needed to be updated and TheatreZone was able to get in contact with composer Jerry Herman who allowed the rework of the show with his approval. Their second season included the play "Miracle in Rwanda," about a woman who survived the Rwandan genocide by hiding in a bathroom with seven other women for 91 days. The world premiere took place at TheatreZone on February 9, 2007. Following its premiere, the show moved to New York City for one month, and opened in Edinburgh, Scotland in August 2007.
