= Toni Ann Gisondi =

American actress

- Born: January 1, 1975 (age 51); Egg Harbor Township, New Jersey, U.S.
- Occupation: Actress
- Years active: 1982–2023
- Spouse: Theodore Pugliese (m. 1999)
- Children: 2

Toni Ann Gisondi (born January 1, 1975) is a former child actress, best known for playing Molly the youngest orphan in the 1982 film version of the musical Annie.

Gisondi was born and grew up in Egg Harbor Township, New Jersey, where she attended Holy Spirit High School.

== Acting career ==
Gisondi was six when she was picked for the role of Molly in the 1982 film version of the musical Annie, which starred Aileen Quinn in the title role. She was nominated for "Best Young Supporting Actress in a Motion Picture" in the 1981–1982 Young Artist Awards, and merited a mention in the 2002 edition of the St. James Encyclopedia of Pop Culture, for her "sweet" performance.

She also performed on the best-selling soundtrack album to the movie of Annie and went on to act in a made-for-TV movie, The Children's Story, also in 1982, in which she played a student. She has not done any acting work since.

== Personal life ==
Gisondi is married to Theodore Pugliese and the couple has two daughters, Molly Marie and Melody Rose. Molly, who was born on November 1, 2000, shares her name with the orphan Gisondi played in Annie.
