= Rosanne Sorrentino =

American actress

- Born: January 15, 1968 (age 58); Long Island, New York
- Years active: 1976−present
- Height: 5 ft 0 in (152 cm)
- Children: 2

Rosanne Sorrentino is a former child actress, best known for playing the role of the bossy orphan Pepper in the 1982 film of the musical Annie.

== Early life ==
Rosanne Sorrentino was born on January 15, 1968, in Oceanside, Long Island, New York. She made her professional stage debut at aged 12 in the third national tour of Annie in 1980-81, playing the role of Annie.

Sorrentino was "bitten by the acting bug" in 1976, when she played a schoolgirl in the American Academy of Dramatic Arts's summer workshop production of The Prime of Miss Jean Brodie. She was also a member of her school chorus at Lindenhurst Senior High School, and it was under the direction of her school music teacher, Liz Costa, that she developed her love for singing. She also was involved with the Charles Street Players in Lindenhurst High School.

Although Sorrentino received positive reviews for her stage portrayal of Annie, she was considered too old, at the age of 13, to be cast as Annie in the film version. Instead, after auditioning, she was offered, and accepted, the role of Pepper - the oldest and bossiest orphan.

== Filmography ==
- Annie (1982) as Pepper

=== Soundtrack ===
- Annie (1982) soundtrack: "It's a Hard-Knock Life", "Sandy", "Maybe" (Reprise), "You're Never Fully Dressed Without a Smile", "Finale Medley: I Don't Need Anything but You/We Got Annie/Tomorrow".

=== Documentary ===
- Life After Tomorrow (2006) as herself in this documentary about life after appearing in Annie.

== Personal life ==
Sorrentino has two daughters, Bridget and Sarah Kavanagh. She works at Brentwood North Middle School as an assistant principal on Long Island, but is still an actress and singer as well. She is also currently a member of DCRP, a local club devoted to running and other activities.
