= Andrea McArdle =

American singer and actress

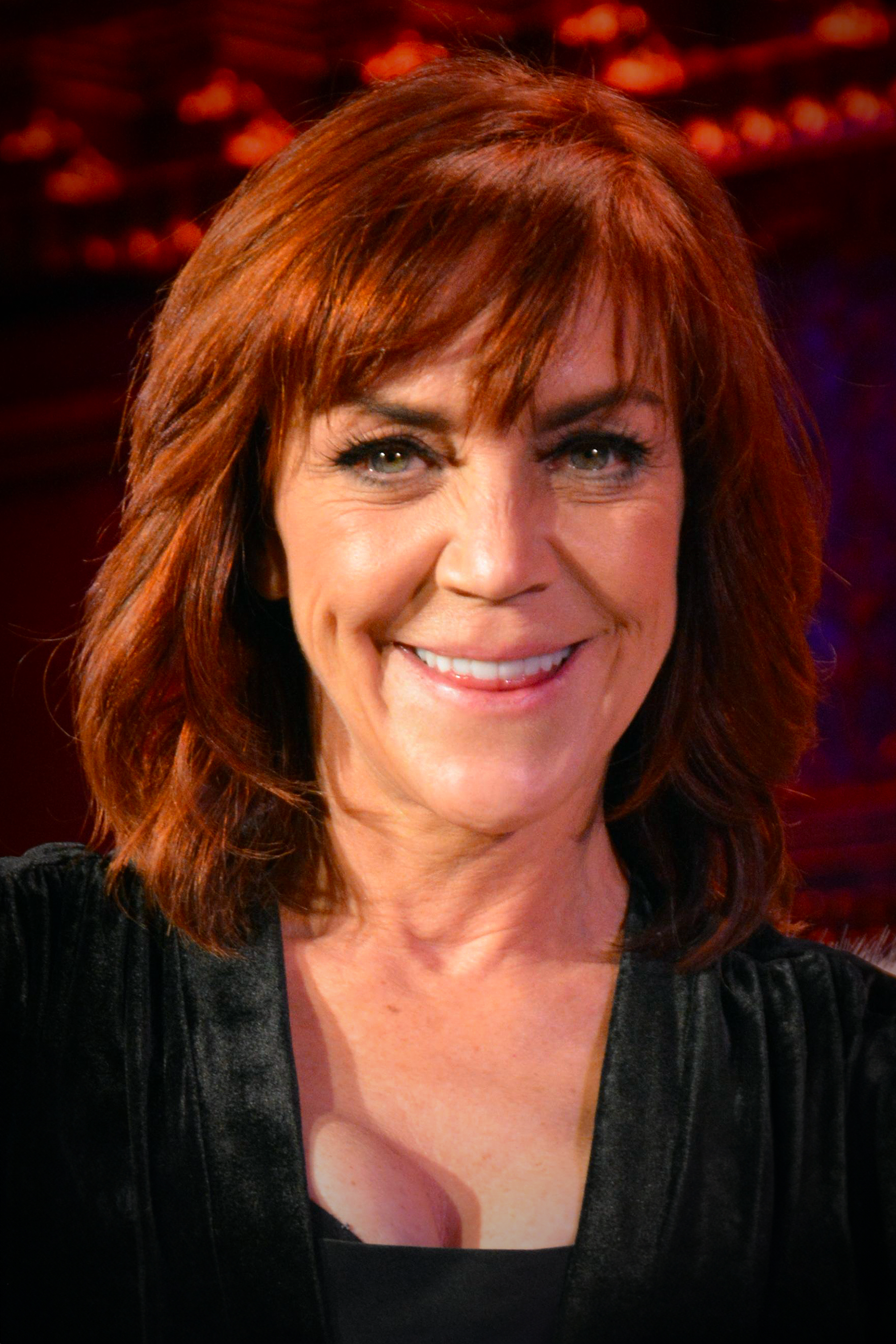
- McArdle in 2023

Background information
- Born: November 5, 1963 (age 63); Philadelphia, Pennsylvania, U.S.
- Occupations: Singer, actress
- Years active: 1970–present
- Spouse: Edd Kalehoff (m. 1988; div. 2011)

Andrea McArdle (born November 5, 1963) is an American singer and actress best known for originating the role of Annie in the Broadway musical Annie.

== Career ==
McArdle appeared on Al Alberts Showcase, a local televised talent show in Philadelphia.

In 1977, she originated the role of Annie in the Broadway musical Annie, for which she was nominated for a Tony Award as Outstanding Lead Actress in a Musical. In April 1978, she opened the London West End production in the same role. She appeared several times on The Tonight Show Starring Johnny Carson in 1977–1979, on one occasion accompanied by Liberace. She also appeared more than once on the Mike Douglas Show, singing with Kristy McNichol, Stephanie Mills, Liberace and Don Rickles. She appeared on Perry Como's Christmas show, where she sang with Como, and on Welcome Back Kotter, playing Arnold Horshack's younger sister. In 1978, McArdle sang O Holy Night in the television special Christmas at Walt Disney World.

In 1979, she sang the national anthems for both the United States and Canada at the Major League Baseball All Star Game in Seattle, Washington. She also sang the American national anthem at Veterans Stadium in Philadelphia for the fifth and final game of the 1983 World Series, in her capacity as a native of Philadelphia, as well as "God Bless America" prior to the Eagles hosting the Dallas Cowboys in the 1980 NFC Championship.

Her first role after returning to the States was the role of Judy Garland in NBC's telepic Rainbow, but throughout her career she has concentrated primarily on performing in musical theater and cabarets. Her credits include Les Misérables (both on Broadway and in the national tour), Jerry's Girls (a revue of Jerry Herman songs co-starring Carol Channing and Leslie Uggams), Beauty and the Beast, Starlight Express, Meet Me In St. Louis, The Wizard of Oz, They're Playing Our Song, and another celebrated Annie in Irving Berlin's classic, Annie Get Your Gun. She briefly appeared in the 1999 Rob Marshall-directed TV version of Annie, singing the "Star To Be" segment of the song "N.Y.C."

McArdle has performed in the showrooms of many of the casino hotels in Las Vegas and Atlantic City, and in cabarets such as Odette's in New Hope, Pennsylvania and the King Cole Room at the St. Regis Hotel and Freddy's Supper Club in Manhattan. McArdle once again starred in the musical Annie with the North Carolina Theatre Company, although she portrayed the role of Miss Hannigan, at odds with her former character.

Her CD, Andrea McArdle on Broadway, was arranged and produced by her ex-husband, composer Edd Kalehoff, who also collaborated with her on an album of Christmas songs that was released in conjunction with her Family Christmas Show at the Tropicana Hotel & Casino in Atlantic City, New Jersey. The Christmas show, "Andrea McArdle's Family Christmas" ran for three Christmases and featured dancers, singers and acrobats from Encore Productions in South Jersey. McArdle also sang and appeared in several television promotional campaigns produced by Kalehoff, including WNBC-TV's We're 4 New York in 1992, and WEWS-TV's Give Me 5 in 1995. Divorced in August 2011, the couple had one daughter, Alexis Kalehoff (b.1988), a performer who has appeared with her mother in Les Miz.

McArdle returned to Annie at Musical Theatre West in Long Beach, California, as Miss Hannigan from October 29 - November 14, 2010. She took part in the New York Musical Theatre Festival's (NYMF) production of Greenwood the Musical in fall 2011 along with her daughter Alexis Kalehoff and fellow Annie alumna Alicia Morton.

In November 2012, McArdle was the "guest star" in Newsical.

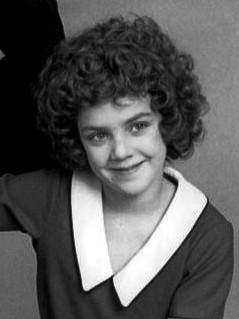
McArdle in ''Annie'' in 1977

On April 2, 2014 Oceania Cruises announced a new "Life in the Theater" series featuring McArdle, for select sailings starting with a voyage aboard Riviera on October 29, 2014.

In December 2015, McArdle starred in the Off-Broadway play 2 Across at St. Luke's Theatre along with Kip Gilman.

In May 2016, McArdle starred as Reno Sweeney in Cole Porter's Anything Goes. The show also featured Sally Struthers. The production opened at Gateway Playhouse (Bellport, New York), and later transferred to Ogunquit Playhouse. The production was directed by Jayme McDaniel, and choreographed by Jason Wise.

In November 2021, it was announced that McArdle would be playing Eleanor Roosevelt in NBC's Annie Live!, but she later had to drop out due to a family emergency. The character was subsequently written out, but McArdle does appear in the cast recording for the special.

== Personal life ==
Andrea was married to composer Edd Kalehoff from 1988 until they divorced in 2011. She has a daughter, Alexis Kalehoff, who has appeared in many Broadway theatre productions.

== Stage work ==
Year	Production	Role	Venue
1977	Annie	Annie	Broadway
1978	Annie	Annie	West End, Played role for 40 performances
1984	Jerry's Girls	Ensemble	Tour
1985	Annie Get Your Gun	Annie Oakley	Regional, San Bernardino Civic Light Opera in San Bernardino, CA
1985	The Wizard of Oz	Dorothy Gale	Regional, Melody Top Theatre in Milwaukee
Unknown	The Vagina Monologues	Performer	Regional
1987	Starlight Express	Ashley	Broadway
1989	Meet Me in St. Louis	Esther Smith	Regional, Melody Top Theatre in Milwaukee
1992	They're Playing Our Song	Sonia	Tour
1993	Les Misérables	Fantine	Broadway
1994	Les Misérables	Eponine	National Tour
1995	State Fair	Margy Frake	Broadway
1996	Oliver!	Nancy	Regional
1996	Joseph and the Amazing Technicolor Dreamcoat	The Narrator	Regional
1996	The Fantasticks	Luisa	Regional
1997	Evita	Eva Perón	Regional
1999	Beauty and the Beast	Belle	Broadway
2000	Grease	Sandy Dumbrowski	Regional
2001	Cabaret	Sally Bowles	international tour
2002	Annie Get Your Gun	Annie Oakley	Regional, Reagle Players
2006	Annie Get Your Gun	Annie Oakley	Regional, Prince Music Theatre
2006	Cabaret	Sally Bowles	Regional, Ogunquit Playhouse
2007	Gypsy	Rose	Regional
2008	Les Misérables	Fantine	Regional, Ogunquit Playhouse
2010	Annie	Miss Hannigan	North Carolina Theatre
2010	Annie	Miss Hannigan	Musical Theatre West, Long Beach
2011	Blood Brothers	Mrs. Johnstone	Theatre Zone, Naples, Florida
2011	Urinetown	Penelope Pennywise	Connecticut Repertory Theatre
2011	Greenwood the Musical	Adult Sheila	New York Musical Theatre Festival
2012	NEWSical the Musical	Guest Star/Various Characters	Off-Broadway
2013	Mame	Mame Dennis	Bucks County Playhouse New Hope, Pennsylvania & The Media Theatre, Media, Pennsylvania
2015	Hello, Dolly!	Mrs. Dolly Gallagher Levi	The Media Theatre, Media, Pennsylvania
2015	2 Across	Janet	Off-Broadway
2016	Anything Goes	Reno Sweeney	Regional, Gateway Playhouse, Bellport, NY
2016	Anything Goes	Reno Sweeney	Regional, Ogunquit Playhouse
2023	42nd Street	Dorothy Brock	Regional, Riverside Center for the Performing Arts

== Film and television ==
Year	Title	Role	Notes
1974	Moe and Joe	Julia Lambert	(TV Short) (Credited as Andrea McCardle)
1977	Welcome Back, Kotter	Doris Horshack	
1977	Search for Tomorrow	Wendy Wilkins #1	4 episodes
1977	The Annie Christmas Show	Little Orphan Annie	TV special
1977	Dinah!	Herself	
1977–1980	The Mike Douglas Show	Self – Actress	
1978	Rainbow	Judy Garland	TV movie
1978	Christmas at Walt Disney World	Herself	Television special
1982	Doug Henning: Magic on Broadway	Herself	TV special
1982	Broadway Plays Washington on Kennedy Center Tonight	Herself	TV special
1992	All My Children	Cookie	Soap opera
1997	20/20 Wednesday	Herself	Documentary
1999	Annie	Star-To-Be	TV movie from The Wonderful World of Disney
1999	Jeopardy!	Celebrity Contestant	
2001	Reading Rainbow	Herself	Voice role
2002	The Daily Show	Herself	
2003	Listen to Her Heart: The Life and Music of Laurie Beechman	Herself	Documentary
2008	The Battery's Down	Herself	TV series
2010	Peace Aqua	Sloan	Short
2014	Russian Broadway Shut Down	Villager	Short
2016	Murphy Crib	Dr. Regina	Short
2017	American Songbook at NJPAC Hosted by Michael Feinstein	Herself	
2018	Broadway: Beyond the Golden Age	Herself	Documentary
2019	We Can Cook Too!	Guest Star	TV series
2020	Stars in the House	Herself	TV series

== Awards and honors ==
- 1977 – Theatre World Award – winner
- 1977 – Tony Award - Outstanding Lead Actress in a Musical – nominee
