= Martin Charnin =

American lyricist, writer, and theatre director (1934–2019)

- Born: November 24, 1934; New York City, U.S.
- Died: July 6, 2019 (aged 84); White Plains, New York, U.S.
- Education: Cooper Union
- Occupations: Lyricist; writer; theatre director; actor
- Notable work: Annie
- Spouse: Shelly Burch (m. 2006)
- Children: 3 (+ 3 stepchildren)

Martin Charnin (November 24, 1934 – July 6, 2019) was an American lyricist, writer, and theatre director. Charnin's best-known work is as conceiver, director, and lyricist of the musical Annie.

== Life and career ==
Charnin was born in New York City, the son of Birdie (Blakeman) and William Charnin, an opera singer. His family was Jewish. Charnin graduated from The High School of Music & Art and then from The Cooper Union, where he earned a BFA. Charnin began his theatrical career as a performer, appearing as "Big Deal", one of the Jets in the original production of West Side Story. He played the role for 1,000 performances on Broadway and on the road. He wrote music and lyrics for numerous Off-Broadway and cabaret revues, many of them for Julius Monk. He then went on to write, direct, and produce nightclub acts for Dionne Warwick, Nancy Wilson, Mary Travers, Larry Kert, Jose Ferrer, and Leslie Uggams.

The first Broadway musical for which he wrote the lyrics was the 1963 musical Hot Spot starring Judy Holliday, with music by Mary Rodgers. He contributed lyrics to Vernon Duke's musical Zenda which ran in California in 1963 but did not reach Broadway. In 1967, he wrote the lyrics for Mata Hari, which was produced by David Merrick. He wrote lyrics to Richard Rodgers' music and Peter Stone's book for the musical Two by Two (1970), which starred Danny Kaye and ran on Broadway for 10 months.

In the early 1970s, he worked in television where he conceived, produced, wrote and directed six television variety specials. In 1971, he won the Emmy Award for Annie, The Women in the Life of a Man, which starred Anne Bancroft. In 1972, he won two primetime Emmy Awards for S'Wonderful, S'Marvelous, S'Gershwin, which starred, among others, Jack Lemmon, Fred Astaire, Ethel Merman, Larry Kert, and Robert Guillaume. His other television specials included Get Happy (starring Jack Lemmon, Johnny Mathis, Cass Elliot), Dames at Sea (1971, starring Ann-Margret, Anne Meara, Ann Miller, Dick Shawn, Harvey Evans, and Fred Gwynne), Cole Porter in Paris (starring Perry Como, Twiggy, Louis Jourdan, Charles Aznavour), and a second Bancroft special titled Annie and the Hoods. He supplied music and lyrics for the song "The Best Thing You've Ever Done", sung by Barbra Streisand on her multi-platinum album The Way We Were.

He made his Broadway directing debut in 1973, conceiving and directing the revue Nash at Nine, based on the works of Ogden Nash and starring E.G. Marshall and running for 21 performances. He next directed the revue Music! Music!, which had a libretto by Alan Jay Lerner and ran at City Center for 37 performances in 1974. He directed The National Lampoon Show (1975) and its road company. The New York version starred John Belushi, Gilda Radner, Bill Murray, and other Saturday Night Live performers.

He then created, wrote the lyrics for and directed Annie at the Goodspeed Opera House. Annie moved to Broadway and ran for 2,327 performances, becoming one of the 25 longest running musicals in Broadway history. His collaborators were Charles Strouse and Thomas Meehan. He went on to direct the five U.S. national companies of Annie and three productions in the West End in London. While in London, he directed Bar Mitzvah Boy (1978), which had music by Jule Styne and lyrics by Don Black.

He wrote the lyrics for I Remember Mama (1979) with music by Richard Rodgers, and directed, wrote the lyrics for, and co-wrote the book for The First (1981), a musical about Jackie Robinson and the integration of baseball, for which he was nominated for two Tony Awards. He directed A Little Family Business on Broadway in 1982, which starred Angela Lansbury and John McMartin, and Eli Wallach and Anne Jackson in The Flowering Peach for Tony Randall's National Theatre, on Broadway. He wrote additional lyrics for La Strada (1969) and The Madwoman of Central Park West (1979). He directed Cafe Crown in 1988 at the Off-Broadway Public Theater, which subsequently transferred to Broadway in 1989. In 1989 he directed Sid Caesar & Company on Broadway. He directed Laughing Matters in 1989 at the Theater at St. Peter's Church, New York, a revue written by and starring Peter Tolan and Linda Wallem. He directed Jeanne La Pucelle (1997) in Montreal, with book and lyrics by Vincent de Tourdonnet and music by Peter Sipos.

In the 1990s, he directed dozens of companies of Annie, and its sequel Annie Warbucks; in 1997, he directed three additional companies of Annie in London, Australia and Amsterdam. He directed the 20th anniversary production of Annie on Broadway, and in 2004, he directed the 30th anniversary production of Annie, produced by Ken Gentry and Networks. It ran for three and a half years all over the U.S.

He conceived and directed the cabaret revue Upstairs at O'Neals, which ran Off-Broadway from October 1982 to July 1983 at O'Neal's restaurant. He directed and wrote the book with Douglas Bernstein and Denis Markell and music with Marvin Hamlisch, Thomas Meehan, Billy Weeden and David Finkle for The No Frills Revue; sketches were written by Ronny Graham among others. The revue featured his daughter, Sasha Charnin Morrison. The revue opened Off-Broadway at the Cherry Lane Theater in October 1987. He directed the premiere stage adaptation of Jules Feiffer's Carnal Knowledge Off-Broadway at the Kaufman Theatre in 1990 and Wallach and Jackson in In Persons.

In regional theatre, he directed Robin Hood: The Legend Continues which ran at the Village Theatre, Issaquah, Washington in December 2004. He also wrote the lyrics, with music by Peter Sipos and the book by Thomas Meehan, and the cast featured Shelly Burch. He directed A.R. Gurney's Later Life in Orlando in 2005, featuring Shelly Burch. He created, wrote or directed regional shows including Love is Love, Shadowlands, and in 2010, Sleuth, all for the Village Theatre in Issaquah.

He moved back to the East Coast for the 35th Anniversary revival of Annie, which opened on Broadway at the Palace Theatre in November 2012 and ran until January 2014. He created, produced and directed night club acts for his wife, Shelly Burch, and prepared a new one-woman theatrical entertainment for her for Fall 2014. He directed the revival of Two by Two, starring Jason Alexander as Noah, and Tovah Feldshuh as Noah's wife. It was performed at the York Theatre in 2014 and a new Broadway production was being planned.

Charnin moved to Issaquah, Washington after directing Robin Hood and stayed there until he returned to New York in 2012. He was artistic director of Showtunes!, a theatre company in Seattle, Washington, devoted to resurrecting forgotten and unsung musicals, and celebrating the works of composers, including Richard Rodgers and Irving Berlin, and producing them in concert at Benaroya Hall in Seattle.

== Personal life and death ==
He and his wife, Shelly Burch, lived in New York. He suffered a heart attack on July 3, 2019, and died on July 6, 2019, aged 84, following a period of hospitalization. The marquee lights of Broadway's Neil Simon Theatre (known as the Alvin Theatre when Annie debuted there in 1977) were dimmed in his honor in tribute on July 13, 2019.

== Works ==
=== Stage ===
- Fallout (Revue) (1958)
- Kaleidoscope (Revue) (1960)
- Pieces of Eight (1961) - for Julius Monk
- Upstairs at the Downstairs (1961) - for Julius Monk
- The Littlest Revue (1961) - for Ben Bagley
- Zenda (1963) - co-lyricist, music by Vernon Duke
- Hot Spot (1963) - lyricist; music by Mary Rodgers
- Mata Hari (1967) - lyricist; music by Edward Thomas, book by Jerome Coopersmith
- Ballad for a Firing Squad [revision of Mata Hari] (1968)
- La Strada (1969) – additional lyrics; Music by Eliot Lawrence
- Two by Two (1971) – lyricist; music by Richard Rodgers, book by Peter Stone
- Nash at Nine (1973) - director; music by Milton Rosenstock
- Music! Music! (1974) - director; book by Alan Jay Lerner, various composers
- Annie (1977) - conceived, director and lyricist; music by Charles Strouse, book by Thomas Meehan
- Bar Mitzvah Boy (1979) – director; music by Jule Styne, lyrics by Don Black, book by Jack Rosenthal
- I Remember Mama (1979) – lyricist; music by Richard Rodgers, book by Thomas Meehan
- The Madwoman of Central Park West (1979) – additional lyrics
- The First (1981) – lyricist, director; co-book writer with Joel Siegel, music by Bob Brush
- A Little Family Business (1982) – director, Written by Jay Presson Allen
- Upstairs at O'Neal's (1982) – creator and director
- Jokers (1986) – director, Goodspeed Opera House, East Haddam
- The No-Frills Revue (1987) – creator and director
- Cafe Crown (1989) – director
- Sid Caesar & Company (1989) - director
- Laughing Matters (1989) - director, St. Peter's Church, New York City
- Carnal Knowledge (1990) – director; Written by Jules Feiffer; Kaufman Theater
- Annie Warbucks (1993) – director, lyricist; music by Charles Strouse, book by Thomas Meehan
- Starcrossed: The Trial of Galileo (1994) – director; lyrics by Keith Levenson, music by Jeanine Tesori at Goodspeed/Norma Terris Theatre, Connecticut
- Can-Can (1995) – director; music and lyrics by Cole Porter, Book by Abe Burrows, revised by Martin Charnin at Goodspeed Opera House, Connecticut
- The Flowering Peach (1997) – director; Written by Clifford Odets
- Annie (1997) Broadway Revival – director, lyricist
- Jeanne La Pucelle (1997) - director; book & lyrics by Vincent de Tourdonnet, music by Peter Sipos
- Two by Two (2004) director, lyricist. Revised book by Peter Stone
- Robin Hood: The Legend Continues (2004) - director, lyricist; music by[Peter Sipos; book by Thomas Meehan
- Later Life (2005) director (Orlando, Florida)
- Annie (2005) 30th Anniversary Production – director, lyricist
- Shadowlands (2006) – director; written by William Nicholson
- Annie Warbucks (2008) - director, lyricist (For Showtunes)
- Rodgers &... (2009) - writer, director, lyricist (Lyrics and Lyricists, 92nd Street Y, New York City)
- Love Is Love (2009) Musical Revue - director, lyricist; music by Richard Gray (Florida)
- Follies (2010) - Artistic Director, Concert (For Showtunes Theatre Company, Seattle.)
- Sleuth (2010) - director; written by Anthony Shaffer
- The Melody Lingers On: The Songs of Irving Berlin (2011) - director, author. (For Showtunes Theatre Company, Seattle.)
- Real to Reel (Songs that went from stage to screen) (2012) - director, author. (For Showtunes Theatre Company, Seattle.)
- The Broadway Revues (A Tribute to the Great Revues from The Follies to Sugar Babies) (2012) - director, author. (For Showtunes Theatre Company, Seattle.)
- Rodgers & (2013) The Emelin Theatre
- Real to Reel (2014) The Emelin Theatre
- Something Funny's Going On (revue) 54Below, New York City
- “I Happen To Like New York” (2015) Emelin Theatre starring Shelly Burch
- ”In The Secret Sea” (2016)Theatre Row
- ”Incurably Romantic”(2016)starring Burch
- ”Forgotten Broadway” (2017)-Emelin Theatre

=== Television and film ===
- Feathertop (1961) ABC - (lyricists; music by Mary Rodgers)
- The Jackie Gleason Show (1961) CBS - (lyricist; music by Mary Rodgers)
- Annie, The Woman in the Life of a Man (1971) - (conceived; produced; wrote; and directed)
- S'Wonderful, S'Marvelous, S'Gershwin (1972) - (conceived; produced; wrote; and directed)
- Get Happy - (conceived; produced; wrote; and directed)
- Dames at Sea - (conceived; produced; wrote; and directed)
- Cole Porter in Paris - (conceived; produced; wrote; and directed)
- Annie and the Hoods - (conceived; produced; wrote; and directed)
- The Annie Christmas Show (1977) CBS - (director, producer)
- Annie (1982) Columbia Pictures (starring Carol Burnett, Albert Finney, Bernadette Peters)
- Annie (1999) Disney (starring Kathy Bates, Audra McDonald, Victor Garber, Alan Cumming, Kristin Chenoweth)
- Annie (2014) Columbia Pictures (starring Quvenzhané Wallis, Jamie Foxx, Cameron Diaz, Rose Byrne, Bobby Cannavale)

== Awards and nominations ==
Awards

- 1971 Emmy Award for Outstanding Single Program-Variety or Musical-Variety and Popular Music – Annie, the Women in the Life of a Man
- 1972 Emmy Award for Outstanding Single Program-Variety or Musical-Variety and Popular Music – S'Wonderful, S'Marvelous, S'Gershwin
- 1973 Peabody Award for Broadcasting – S'Wonderful, S'Marvelous, S'Gershwin
- 1977 Drama Desk Award for Outstanding Director of a Musical – Annie
- 1977 Drama Desk Award for Outstanding Lyrics – Annie
- 1977 Tony Award for Best Original Score – Annie
- 2006 The Richard Rodgers Award for Distinguished Contribution to the Performing Arts
- 2011 Goodspeed Musical Award for Outstanding Contribution to the American Musical Theatre
- 2013 The first George M. Cohan Ascap Award

Nominations

- 1972 Emmy Award for Outstanding Writing Achievement in Comedy, Variety, or Music – S'Wonderful, S'Marvelous, S'Gershwin
- 1973 Emmy Award for Outstanding Directorial Achievement in Comedy, Variety, or Music – Get Happy
- 1977 Tony Award for Best Direction of a Musical – Annie
- 1982 Tony Award for Best Book of a Musical – The First
- 1982 Tony Award for Best Direction of a Musical – The First

== Miscellaneous ==
Miscellaneous

- Member of ASCAP, The Writers Guild, The Society of Stage Directors and Choreographers.
- Author: Annie: A Theatrical Memoir (1977) - Published E.P. Dutton, ISBN 978-0-525-03010-2
- Author: The Giraffe who Sounded like Ol' Blue Eyes (illustrated by Kate Draper - Published by E.P. Dutton)
- Album: Nancy Wilson Live at the Sands (1969)
- Album: Annie Original Broadway recording (1977 Columbia Records)
- Album: Upstairs at O'Neal's Original New York Company (1982 Bruce Yeko Records)
- Album: Incurably Romantic (seventeen lyrics; various composers)
- Album: Annie 30th Anniversary Original recording (2005 Time-Life Records)
- Album: Second Coming - Shelly Burch live at the Metropolitan Room in New York City
- Songs recorded by: Barbra Streisand, Tony Bennett, Johnny Mathis, Rod McKuen, Grace Jones, Jay-Z, Nancy Wilson, Andrea McArdle, Shelly Burch, and others
- Unproduced musical - Softly - lyricist, music by Harold Arlen, book by Hugh Wheeler
- Cabaret Acts - Nancy Wilson, Diahann Carrol, Leslie Uggams, Jose Ferrer, Tom Poston, Larry Kert, Andrea McArdle, and Shelly Burch.
