= Harold Gray =

American cartoonist (1894–1968)

- Born: Harold Lincoln Gray; January 20, 1894 Kankakee, Illinois, U.S.
- Died: May 9, 1968 (aged 74) La Jolla, California, U.S.
- Area: Cartoonist
- Notable works: Little Orphan Annie

Harold Lincoln Gray (January 20, 1894 – May 9, 1968) was an American cartoonist, best known as the creator of the newspaper comic strip Little Orphan Annie.

== Early life ==
Harold Gray was born in Kankakee, Illinois on January 20, 1894, to Estella Mary (née Rosencrans) and Ira Lincoln Gray, a farmer. In 1913, he got his first newspaper job at a Lafayette daily. He could trace his American ancestry back to 17th-century settlers. He grew up on farms in Illinois and Indiana, and worked in construction to pay his college tuition at Purdue University. He graduated with a degree in engineering by 1917.

Gray approached cartoonist John T. McCutcheon for advice on breaking into the cartooning field. He could not immediately get cartooning work, but McCutcheon's influence got him work as a reporter for the Chicago Tribune before he enlisted in the military for World War I, where he was a bayonet instructor for six months. Discharged from the military, he returned to the Chicago Tribune and stayed until 1919 when he left to freelance in commercial art. In 1923, while residing in Lombard, Illinois, he became a Freemason.

== Comic strips ==
From 1921 to 1924, he did the lettering for Sidney Smith's The Gumps. After he came up with a strip idea in 1924 for Little Orphan Otto, the title was altered by Chicago Tribune editor Joseph Medill Patterson to Little Orphan Annie, launched August 5, 1924.

Gray's first wife, Doris C. Platt, died in late 1925. He married Winifred Frost in 1929, and the couple moved to Greens Farms, Connecticut, spending winters in La Jolla, California.

By the 1930s, Little Orphan Annie had evolved from a crudely drawn melodrama to a crisply rendered atmospheric story with novelistic plot threads. The dialogue consisted mainly of meditations on Gray's own deeply conservative and nationalistic political philosophy. Gray made no secret of his dislike for the New Deal ways of President Franklin Roosevelt and would often decry unions and other things he saw as impediments to the hard-working American way of life. Critic Jeet Heer, who did his thesis on Gray and wrote introductions to IDW's Little Orphan Annie collections, commented:

Gray wasn't really a conservative in the 1920s: he was more of a general populist, hostile to loan sharks and speculators while celebrating hard working ordinary people whether they're successful ("Daddy" Warbucks) or not (the poor struggling farmers, the Silos). In the 1920s, Gray even defended labor unions, having Annie launch a successful one-girl strike against a boss who mistreats her. Gray's political opinions would take on a more partisan salience in the 1930s when the presidency of Franklin Roosevelt polarized American politics into those who saw the New Deal as the salvation for the working class and those who saw it as the end of American liberty. Gray fell into the anti-FDR camp and Annie became much more explicitly right-wing ... There might be aspects of Gray's life that didn't make it into his strip. There are rumors that he was a skirt-chaser, and that's something that doesn't show up much in Annie, although you can catch hints of it here and there ... Newspaper cartooning is like keeping a daily diary: even if you're writing only about the weather and shopping, bits of your personality will seep into the work. In Gray's case, the strip reflected his flinty world view, his love of hard work, his populist spirit, and also his fear of those he thought were undermining society by their laziness and meanness. You get a very strong sense of the man in his work, which is one reason it's one of the major comic strips ... Sidney Smith (creator of The Gumps) was a giant of his day whose place in history has largely been forgotten. Throughout the 1920s and later, The Gumps was one of the top strips in America, loved by millions. What set The Gumps apart from earlier strips was that, although it had a comic element, Smith also often embraced wholehearted melodrama. It was the first real soap opera strip, with the fate of characters unfolding in month-long narratives ... It's an interesting question why Gray's work continues to be remembered and indeed loved while Smith has been forgotten. I suspect the answer to the question has something to do with Gray's skill at characterization. Like Charles Dickens, Gray had a natural gift for creating characters that are vivid and lifelike. Annie and Warbucks are the best example of this: both of them are so strong and forceful and memorable. Once you read their adventures, it's hard to forget them as people.

Gray sometimes ghosted Little Joe (1933–1972), the strip by his assistant (and cousin) Ed Leffingwell which was continued by Ed's brother Robert. Maw Green, a spin-off of Annie, was published as a topper to Little Orphan Annie. It mixed vaudeville timing with the same deeply conservative attitudes as Annie.

Films, radio and merchandising made Gray a multi-millionaire. He died of cancer at the Scripps Memorial Hospital in La Jolla on May 9, 1968, at the age of 74.

== Archives ==
Harold Gray's work is in the Special Collections Department at the Boston University Library. The Gray collection includes artwork, printed material, correspondence, manuscripts and photographs. The collection contains a scrapbook, a short story by Gray titled "Annie", letters, postcards and telegrams from 1937 to 1967, including correspondence with Collier's, Purdue University, Al Capp and Mort Walker. Gray's appointment books with comic strip dialogue and plots are dated 1929, 1931, 1933–1935, 1937, 1944, 1946, 1949, 1950–1959 and 1961. Photographs show Gray drawing and Gray as a U.S. Army officer.
