= Thomas Meehan (writer) =

American writer (1929–2017)

- Born: Thomas Edward Meehan; August 14, 1929; Ossining, New York, U.S.
- Died: August 21, 2017 (aged 88); Greenwich Village, New York City, U.S.
- Occupations: Playwright; screenwriter
- Spouses: Karen Meehan (divorced); Carolyn Wagstaff Capstick (m. 1988)
- Children: 4
- Writing career
- Notable works: Annie; The Producers; Hairspray
- Notable awards: Tony Award for Best Book of a Musical; Drama Desk Award for Outstanding Book of a Musical

Thomas Edward Meehan (August 14, 1929 – August 21, 2017) was an American writer. He wrote the books for the musicals Annie, The Producers, Hairspray, Young Frankenstein and Cry-Baby. He co-wrote the books for Elf: The Musical and Limelight: The Story of Charlie Chaplin.

He received the Tony Award for Best Book of a Musical three times—in 1977 for Annie, in 2001 for The Producers (shared with Mel Brooks), and in 2003 for Hairspray (shared with Mark O'Donnell).

== Early life ==
His father, Thomas, was a businessman, and his mother, Helen Cecilia O'Neill, was an emergency department nurse.

== Career ==
Meehan moved to Manhattan at age 24, and worked at The New Yorker's "Talk of the Town".

In 1972, Meehan was approached by Martin Charnin to work on a musical based on the comic strip Little Orphan Annie. At first, Meehan was skeptical to accept the offer, but eventually accepted the offer after reading the strip. Meehan wrote Annie with Charles Strouse, who wrote the music, and Martin Charnin who directed and wrote the lyrics. The production took five years to get to Broadway, but after opening in 1977 ran for 2,377 performances.

Additional credits include Ain't Broadway Grand; Oh, Kay!; Bombay Dreams; a musical adaptation of I Remember Mama; and Annie 2: Miss Hannigan's Revenge, which was subsequently reworked and re-staged Off-Broadway as Annie Warbucks. He also wrote the libretto to the opera 1984.

In addition, Meehan was a long-time contributor of humor to The New Yorker, including the famous short story "Yma Dream"; an Emmy Award-winning writer of television comedy; and a collaborator on a number of screenplays, including Mel Brooks' Spaceballs; a remake of To Be or Not to Be; and the family drama One Magic Christmas. Meehan went on to work with Brooks on other projects on Broadway, including The Producers, based on the 1967 film. The show became a Broadway hit that dominated the 2001 Tony Awards and ran for more than 2,500 performances.

Meehan followed that with Hairspray, an adaptation based on John Waters's 1988 film of the same name. It opened in 2002 and ran for 2,642 performances. He co-wrote the book, with Bob Martin, for Elf the Musical. He co-wrote the book for the production of the musical Limelight: The Story of Charlie Chaplin which ran at the La Jolla Playhouse in 2010 and premiered on Broadway in 2012. In 2011 he revised the book originally written by Peter Stone for the Off-Broadway musical Death Takes a Holiday with music and lyrics by Maury Yeston.

In 2012, Meehan wrote the book from the original screenplay by Sylvester Stallone for the musical Rocky. The show premiered in Hamburg in 2012, before transferring to Broadway in 2014.

Meehan held the distinction of being the only writer to have written three Broadway shows that ran for more than 2,000 performances. Reflecting on his work in an interview with The New York Observer in 1999, Meehan said "I wrote stories that were serious, very somber, trying to be in the style of William Faulkner. My career has always been that every time I try something really serious, it's no good, but if I try to be funny, then it works".

== Death ==
Meehan died from cancer at his home in Manhattan on August 21, 2017, one week after his 88th birthday. Five months prior to his death, Meehan had undergone surgery, which later caused his health to deteriorate.

Meehan was survived by two children from his first marriage with Karen Meehan, which ended in divorce, and three other children with Carolyn Wagstaff Capstick, whom he married in 1988 and with whom he remained until his death.

Mel Brooks paid tribute to Meehan, sharing "I'll miss his sweetness & talent. We have all lost a giant of the theatre."

Meehan's archives were donated to the New York Public Library for the Performing Arts Billy Rose Theatre Division in 2023.

== Works ==
=== Selected filmography ===
- That Was the Week That Was (TV) (1964)
- When Things Were Rotten (TV) (1975)
- To Be or Not to Be (with Ronny Graham) (1983)
- One Magic Christmas (with Phillip Borsos) (1985)
- Spaceballs (with Mel Brooks and Ronny Graham) (1987)
- The Producers (with Mel Brooks) (2005)

=== Theater ===
- Annie (1976)
- I Remember Mama (1979)
- Annie Warbucks (1992)
- The Producers (with Mel Brooks) (2001)
- Hairspray (with Mark O'Donnell) (2002)
- Bombay Dreams (with Meera Syal) (2002)
- Limelight: The Story of Charlie Chaplin (with Christopher Curtis) (2006)
- Young Frankenstein (with Mel Brooks) (2007)
- Cry-Baby (with Mark O'Donnell) (2007)
- Elf: The Musical (with Bob Martin) (2010)
- Death Takes a Holiday (with Peter Stone) (2011)
- Rocky the Musical (with Sylvester Stallone) (2012)
- Dave (with Nell Benjamin) (2018)
