= Gene Keyes =

American activist, cartographer and linguist (1941–2025)

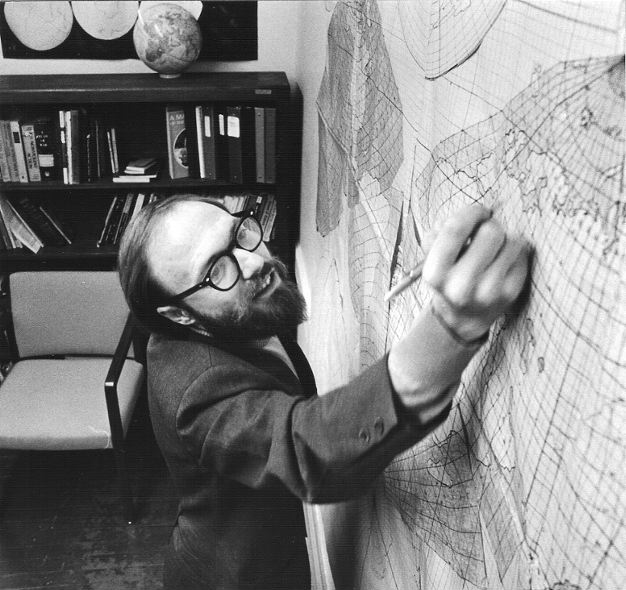
- Born: October 24, 1941
- Died: May 24, 2025 (aged 83)
- Occupation: Cartographer
- Known for: Peace activism, Cahill-Keyes map projection, Strategic Nonviolent Defense and Unarmed Military Forces, Esperanto
- Spouse: Jane Gordon (m. 1968; div. 1984)
- Partner: Mary Jo Graça (1989–2025)
- Children: 2
- Relatives: Ralph Keyes (brother)
- Awards: Honorable Mention - Cartography and Geographic Information Society 2013 (shared with Joe Roubal) for one-degree globe Best Map, Other Category, Cartography and Geographic Information Society 2014 (shared with Duncan Webb and Mary Jo Graça) for Cahill-Keyes World Political Map

Academic background
- Thesis: Strategic Nonviolent Defense in Theory; Denmark in Practice (1978)
- Influences: Buckminster Fuller, Mohandas Gandhi, Gene Sharp, A.J. Muste

Academic work
- Discipline: International Relations
- Notable ideas: Strategic Nonviolence, Cahill-Keyes map projection

Gene Scott Keyes (October 24, 1941 – May 24, 2025) was an American activist, cartographer and linguist. He achieved considerable attention for his peace activism when his mother wrote an essay about him in McCall's titled "Suppose They Gave a War and No One Came" (1966). The title phrase, based on a quote from a Carl Sandburg poem, became part of the anti-war movement lexicon. His cartography work has won two awards. He also promoted the international second language Esperanto.

== Biography ==
=== Early life ===
Keyes was born on October 24, 1941, to Charlotte Keyes (née Shachmann) and Scott Keyes. His father was a Quaker and his mother was Jewish. Both were pacifists. They had been anti-militarists in the 1930s though they both supported American involvement in World War II as they believed Adolf Hitler had to be stopped by force if necessary. After the war they became more involved with the Quaker movement. Young Gene absorbed his parents' pacifism even to the point of worrying about the insects his mother killed as she cleaned house.

=== Polaris Action ===
After graduating high school, Keyes was accepted to Harvard, class of 1963, and during his time there joined demonstrations at Woolworth's in support of desegregating their stores in the American South (inspired by the February 1960 Greensboro sit-ins). He taught Spanish at the local jail, leafleted about nuclear weapons, and joined a variety of liberal groups. His activism led to a deterioration of his grades.

in February 1961, he left university to join Polaris Action, an activist group bent on civil disobedience to protest against nuclear weapons. Polaris submarines were nuclear-ballistic-missile firing boats now supplanted by the Trident fleet. He wrote his parents that "the business of Polaris Action is mostly leafleting, speaking, clerical, canvassing, with infrequent melodramatic and physically dangerous moments of submarine boarding. It's the Gandhian idea of lying across the railroad tracks, except we're lying across the Polaris submarines." He moved to New London, Connecticut, to live on a farm with other members of the Polaris Action group. While his parents tried to dissuade him from actual civil disobedience, by August he was in jail for trying to board the USS Ethan Allen. He served seventeen days.

=== Draft Card burning ===
When he turned 18 during university, Keyes was required to register for the draft. He requested conscientious objector status from the Selective Service Commission. But he felt uneasy about it, thinking this was still part of the war system. "All the hospital work a conscientious objector could do in two years would not make up for a single day of napalm and pellet bombs," he wrote.

From 1962 to 1963, he enrolled at Pendle Hill, a Quaker study center near Philadelphia, to research ideas for unarmed military forces.

In March 1963, he went to Washington to testify before a Senate subcommittee against the bill to extend the induction provisions of the Universal Military Training and Service Act and urged "establishing an integral strategic nonviolent national defense system...What is suggested is a basic reorientation of the defense posture of this nation".

"My purpose," he went on, "is not to secure a special berth in the ship of state while others man its artillery." He was quite willing "to participate in the national defense" if the defense establishment changed its "violent premises" to peaceful ones.

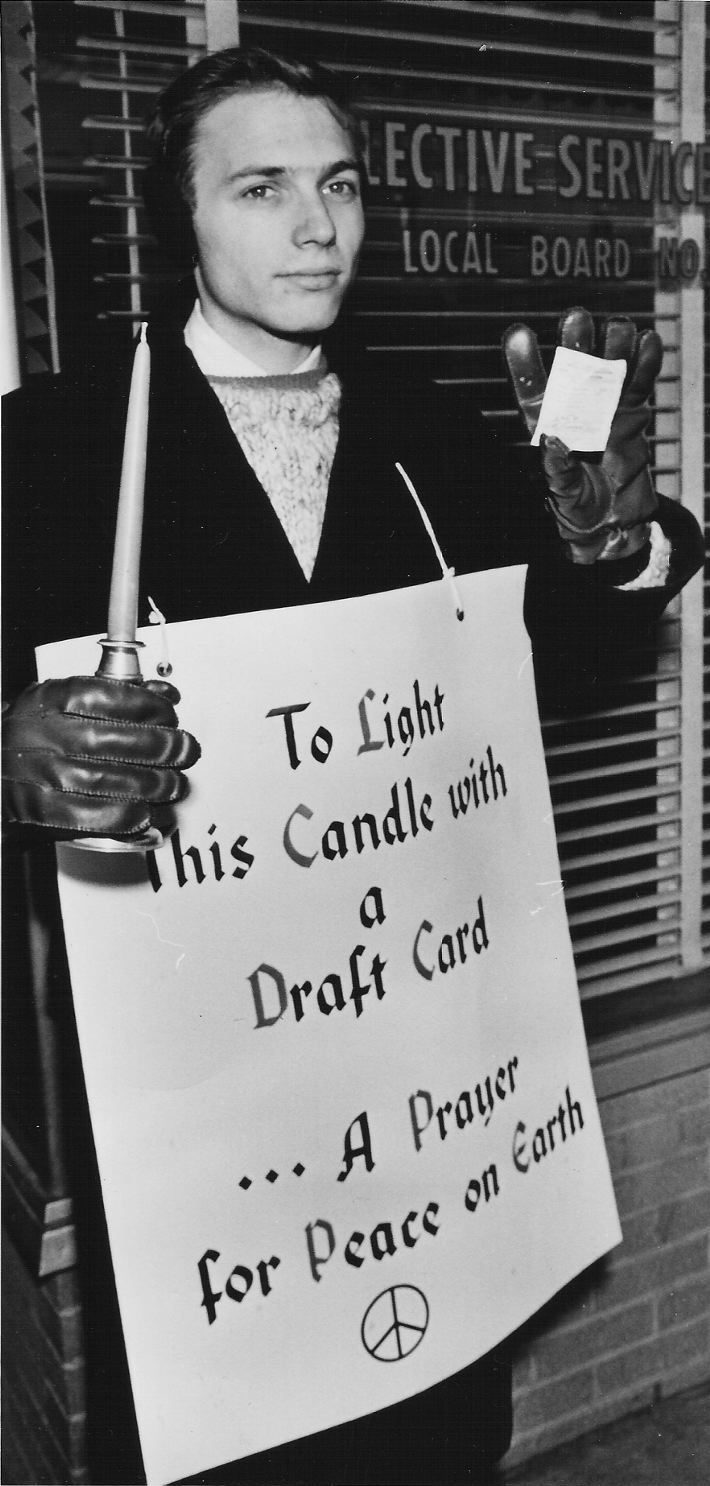
Gene Keyes about to burn his draft card outside the Champaign Selective Service Offices, December 24, 1963

Meanwhile, Keyes had decided on a course of action to dramatize his position. On October 3 he cancelled his application for conscientious objector status. In December that year he wrote to two local newspapers in Champaign-Urbana, Illinois to announce that he would celebrate Christmas, the time to think about peace on earth, by burning his draft card. He wrote, "As a prayer for peace on earth, I will be holding a vigil on Christmas Eve in front of the local draft board." He proposed to stand there for twelve hours starting at noon. "At midnight Christmas Eve I will be using my draft card to light a candle."

On December 24, 1963, he stood outside the draft board wearing a sign that read, "To Light This Candle with a Draft Card - A Prayer for Peace on Earth." He spoke to people throughout his twelve-hour vigil and at midnight, with about twenty-five people present, his girl friend Jane held the candle while he held the draft card with a pair of tongs and lit it with a lighter, then lit the candle.

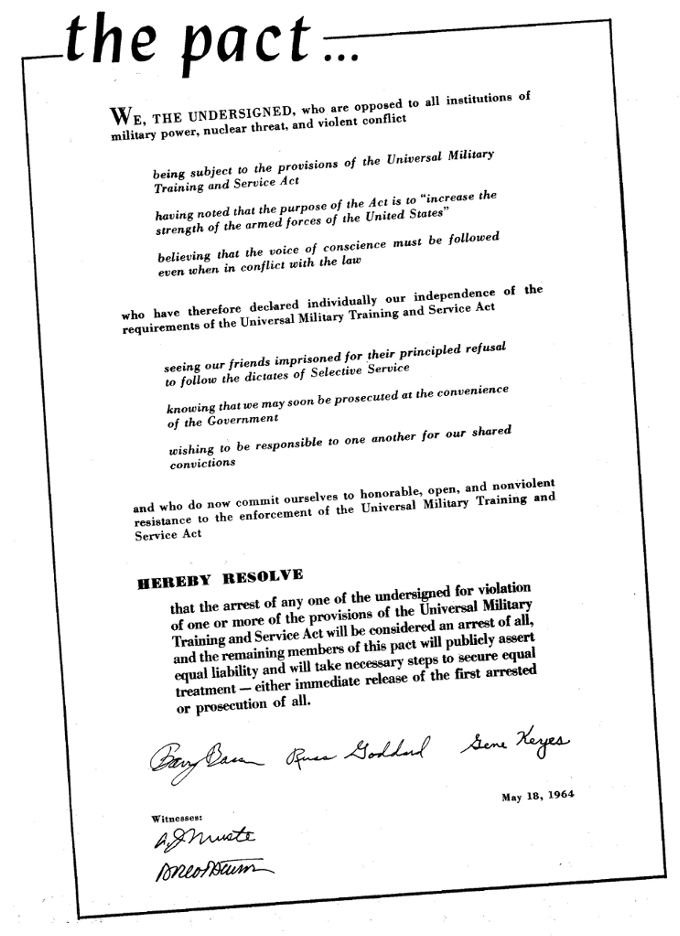
The pact that Keyes and two friends signed committing them to supporting each other in their draft resistance.

On May 15, 1964, he was drafted, but declined in a telegram to the President, Attorney General, and the local Draft Board: "There is no moral validity to any part of any law whose purpose is to train people to kill one another. I hereby reject the order to report for induction."

On May 18, 1964, he and two friends signed a "Pact" to insist upon joint arrest if any one of them was individually picked up for draft resistance. One was convicted in St. Louis in July 1964 and Keyes and the third man stood up in court and got six months each for contempt.

By 1965, draft card burning had become so popular that the U.S. government passed a law making it an offense to knowingly destroy or mutilate a draft card. There had been a draft-card burning event in 1947 when conscription was re-established after World War II, but Keyes was one of the earliest draft card burners of the Vietnam War era.

After finishing the contempt sentence, Keyes was sentenced to three years in prison in 1965 for failing to report for military service. He served one year of the sentence. In all, Keyes served four prison sentences for civil disobedience from 1961 to 1965, including a 27-day hunger strike in the Albany, Georgia, city jail in February 1964, when an integrated peace march was forbidden to march through the middle of town.

In 1966, his mother, Charlotte Keyes wrote about Gene's pacifism and activism culminating in his draft card burning in an essay for McCall's magazine called "Suppose They Gave a War and No One Came". That article gained wide attention and made the title a slogan of the anti-Vietnam war movement. Rephrased as "What if they gave a war and nobody came?", it became a popular bumper sticker of the era. A 1970 anti-war movie adopted the same title and The Monkees recorded a song called "Zor and Zam" (1968) based on the idea.

=== Education and career ===
In 1969, Keyes returned to university, and completed a Bachelor of Arts in 1971 with a Special Major in Government (War-Peace Studies) at Southern Illinois University, Carbondale. He wrote the first senior thesis of the President's Scholar Program (on unarmed military forces). He stayed at SIU-C for an MA in Government in 1973.

Keyes had been a fan of legendary architect, futurist, philosopher and designer of the geodesic dome, Buckminster Fuller, since 1961 and he chose Southern Illinois University at Carbondale largely because Fuller was affiliated with its design department.

One of his interests was Fuller's Dymaxion Map, an attempt to show in a flat projection "all continents uninterrupted and with minimal distortion". Keyes viewed geography as a way of illuminating war and his 1973 Master's thesis looked at a conflict between Russia and China over a tiny island on their river border, a conflict that almost led to a nuclear war. He called the thesis "Six Principles for a Unified Map System (Applied to the China-Russia Situation)". In it Keyes used Fuller's map as the basis of the new system he proposed.

In 1978 he received his Ph.D. in International Relations from York University in Toronto.

Upon graduation, Keyes remained in Canada as an Assistant Professor of Political Science at Brandon University, Manitoba from 1979 to 1980 and from 1990 to 1991. He taught at St. Thomas University, New Brunswick from 1982 to 1983. He also free lanced. Keyes kept his U.S. citizenship.

As a political science professor, Keyes continued to promote the idea of an unarmed military and wrote extensively on the subject. He also pursued an interest in the international second language Esperanto and in world map design.

=== Cahill-Keyes projection map ===
Following his M.A. thesis, Keyes had concluded there were inadequacies with Fuller's map. Further studies later in 1973 led him to discover Bernard J.S. Cahill's Octahedral Butterfly World Map. Created in 1909, Cahill's map had been largely forgotten, but Keyes judged it to be a better map than Fuller's, and he spent much of the next forty years tweaking and improving upon it.

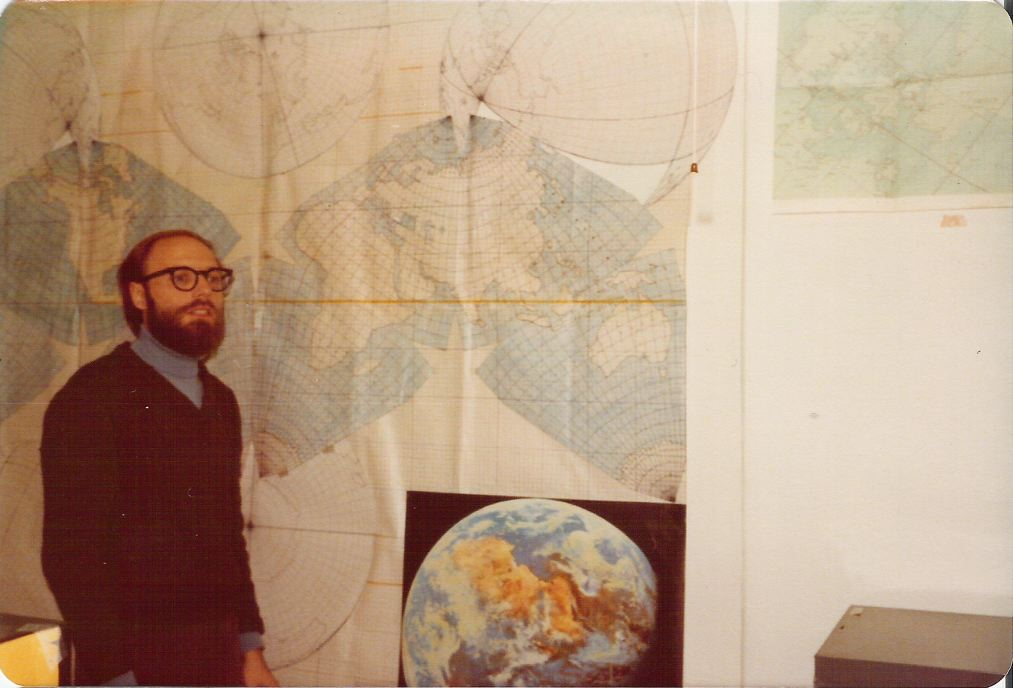
Gene Keyes with the hand drawn first draft of the Cahill-Keyes world map

Cahill's map looked like a butterfly, but it had some anomalies Keyes did not like. In a eureka moment he realized he was not confined to Cahill's butterfly shape. So he redesigned it into an M shape. He also coined the term "geocell" to define an area bounded by one degree of latitude and longitude, because he felt that world maps should have a resolution of at least five degrees and preferably one degree; whereas most world maps and globes do not.

While working on his doctorate in Toronto, he also continued to work on his map. "I was unable to locate large-scale reproductions, drawings, or computations," he wrote, "so I set about drawing my own Cahill from scratch".

"On November 4, 1975, after 40-days and nights," notes an article in Wired magazine on Keyes' forty year quest, "he emerged with a six-and-a-half square foot, hand-drawn, featureless graticule". A graticule is a network of lines or a grid (latitudes and longitudes) on which a map can be projected. He sketched in North America and eventually the whole world.

That 1975 map, the first Cahill-Keyes projection, launched a decades long quest to perfect it. One of his goals is a map with a 1:1 million scale, about half the size of a football field. Each one degree geocell would be large enough to stand in. While the physical Master Map as he calls it, remains a dream, in 2010, his partner Mary Jo Graça, using Keyes's extensive calculations, plotted the entire projection and in 2011 digitized the entire map. Absent the physical version, a 9,000 square foot pdf of that full size map can be easily navigated on a home computer. It is the first contiguous world map at a resolution showing all one-degree geocells (except five degrees at the poles). Keyes likewise commissioned the first-ever one-degree globe from Joe Roubal in 2013.

Ironically, Keyes ever only took one course in cartography (auditing), with most of his studies being in political science.

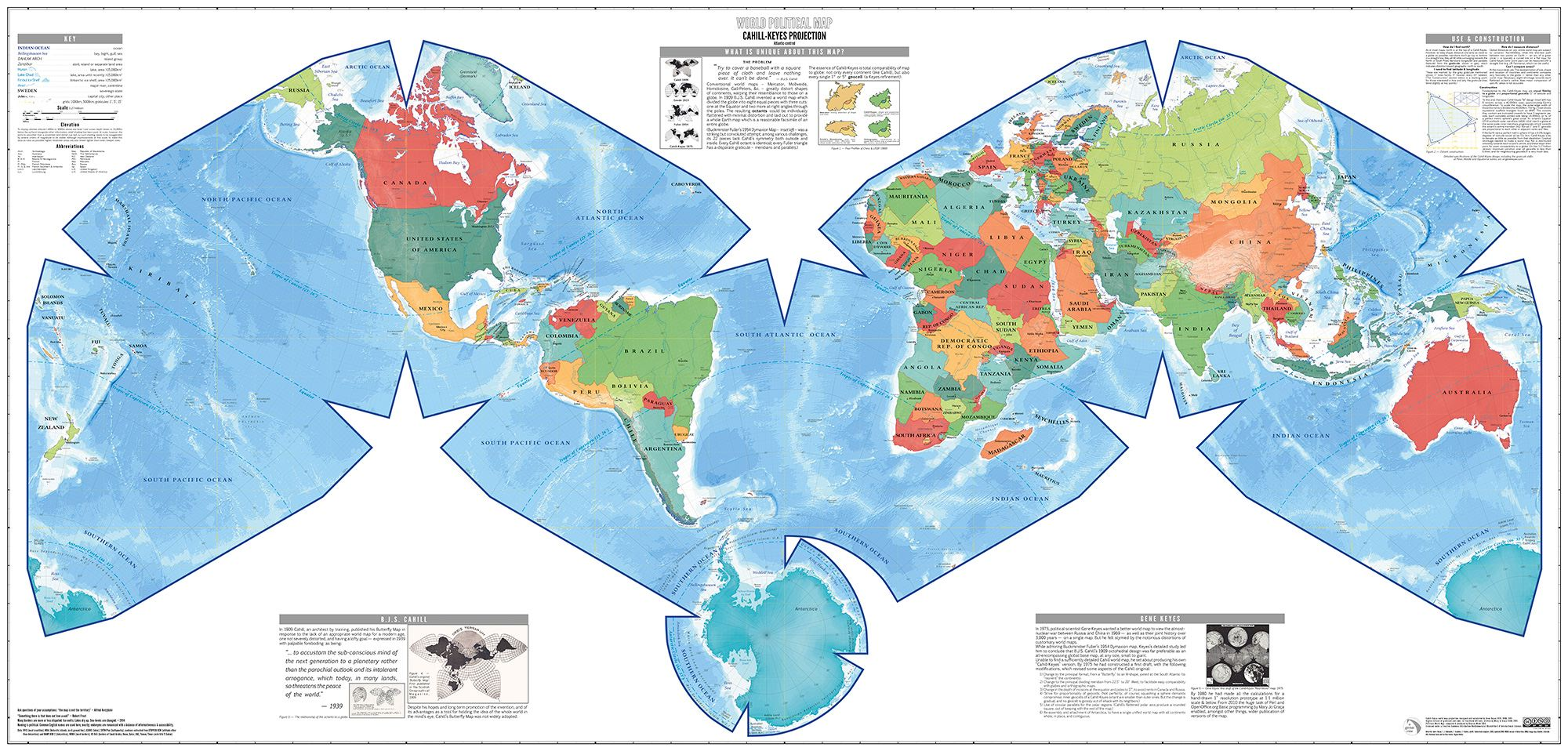
Duncan Webb's political world map for 2013 using the Cahill-Keyes Projection. This map won Best Map, Other Category at the 2014 CaGIS Awards.

=== Cartography awards ===
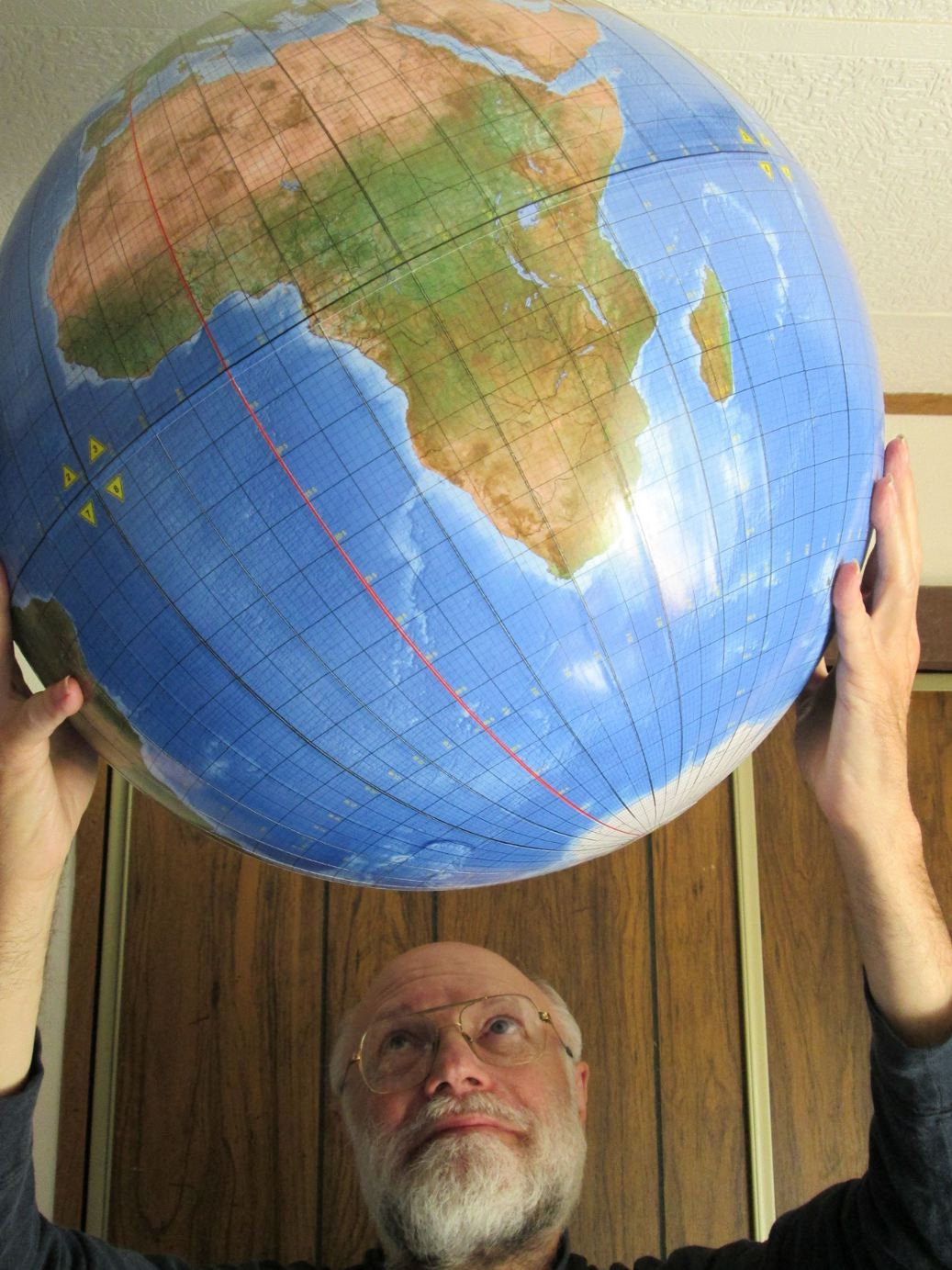
Gene Keyes holding the world's first one-degree globe. This won an honorable mention at the 2013 CaGIS Awards.

Keyes and Roubal's one-degree globe won Honorable Mention at the 41st Annual CaGIS Map Design Competition (Cartography and Geographic Information Society).

In 2014, Duncan Webb published a five-foot wall poster Cahill-Keyes map, which won Best Map, Other Category, in the 42nd Annual CaGIS Competition.

=== Esperanto ===
In 1980, Keyes learned Esperanto. The international second language created by Ludovik Zamenhof was originally published as a pamphlet in several languages in 1887, and for the first time since then, Keyes re-published the English version both on paper and online. Keyes also wrote and uploaded a free HTML edition of a romantic comedy s-f novel (La Mi-Klono, The Me Clone), with English and Esperanto in side-by-side columns. He has also translated eleven Christmas Carols into Esperanto, including a new English version of "O Holy Night", and an unabridged one of "Riu Riu Chiu"; all of them with a simple melody score and the original language plus English. As well, Keyes catalogued the nearly 2,000 item Esperanto library of the late Stevens Norvell, now housed in Alberta.

=== Strategic nonviolent defense and unarmed military forces ===
Keyes's 1978 Ph.D. thesis was Strategic Nonviolent Defense in Theory; Denmark in Practice. A condensed version appeared in The Journal of Strategic Studies as Strategic Nonviolent Defense: the Construct of an Option. In this work, he identifies morale as the center of gravity for a country non-violently resisting an invasion by an enemy.

The latest version of Keyes's long-term interest in a nonviolent military was published as a chapter in the book Nonkilling Security and the State, Joám Evans Pim, ed., 2013 and as an illustrated stand-alone pdf, To Give Life: A Nonkilling Military: Precedents and Possibilities. In it, he elaborates ten kinds of missions for unarmed forces, including such obvious ones as Humanitarian Assistance / Disaster Relief (HA/DR), and hypothetical ones such as Defense in the spirit of Brazil's great national hero, Major-General Cândido Mariano da Silva Rondon (1865-1958), who fostered the motto "Die if you must, but never kill."

An earlier edition appeared in 1982 in Co-Evolution Quarterly (later Whole Earth Review), as Force Without Firepower.

=== Shared parenting advocate ===
After Keyes lost his battle for shared-custody of his children in 1984, he led a shared parenting advocacy group in Nova Scotia. In 1998 he testified on shared parenting before Special Joint Committee on Child Custody and Access of the Government of Canada. "I think that situation, where 60,000 children a year are forcibly denied any kind of equal parenting time with their fathers, is one of the worst state-enforced abuses of human rights in Canada today," he told the committee. "The court ordeals we go through are sickening and unbelievable. Abusive lawyers are rewarded by adversarial, winner-take-all courts. We have debtors' prison for fathers only. We have children moved away at the mother's whim. We have shattered families, devastated fathers, and scarred children. These are the dark ages of family law in Canada." Keyes submitted a 17-page brief called Family Rights for Children of Divorce, a document his Nova Scotia advocacy had created.

=== Personal life ===
Keyes had two brothers and one sister. His brother Ralph Keyes is the author of the best-seller Is There Life After High School? which became a Broadway musical.

In 1968, Keyes married his girlfriend Jane Gordon. They moved to Canada in 1973 when Jane found employment there. They have two children, Jeremy David, born in 1976 and Rachel Elizabeth, born in 1979. In 1980, Jane filed for divorce demanding sole custody of the children. Without a lawyer, Keyes fought for equal-shared-parenting all the way to the Supreme Court of Canada but was only given limited "visitation" rights when the divorce was finalized in 1984. He lived in Canada since 1973 but retained his American citizenship.

He lived with his partner, Mary Jo Graça, from 1989 until his death in 2025.

== Books ==
- We Won't Go: Personal Accounts of War Objectors, Alice Lynd, ed., 1968 (contributor)
- Nonkilling Security and the State, Joám Evans Pim, ed., 2013 (contributor) ISBN 0983986215.
- The Me Clone, La Mi-Klono - self-published novel in English and Esperanto side by side, 220 pages, 1988
