= Suppose They Gave a War and No One Came =

Essay by Charlotte E. Keyes

"Suppose They Gave a War and No One Came" is an essay by American poet and author Charlotte E. Keyes about her son Gene and his opposition and resistance to the draft in the Vietnam War. The title is based on a line from The People, Yes (1936), a poem by Carl Sandburg. Keyes, an organizer with Women Strike for Peace, published her essay in McCall's magazine in October 1966, during a period of U.S. military escalation and increasing war casualties, with variations of the title later becoming an anti-war and peace slogan of the 1960s.

The essay popularized the idea of taking a position against the war and engaging in civil disobedience at a time when public opposition to the conflict was in the minority. The essay's success was attributed to Keyes's writing style, which invited readers to engage with the controversial topic without alienating them. Critics credited Keyes's account of accepting her son's decision to break the law with the ability of readers to experience that same understanding vicariously through the essay.

The essay received wider attention through its mass reprinting and distribution by antiwar groups as part of consciousness raising. Five years later, writes American historian Christian Appy, the tide had turned, and by 1971, an idea that had once been dismissed had now taken hold of the nation.

== Synopsis ==
Keyes begins her essay with a portrait of her 25-year-old son, Gene, whose opposition to war has sent him to prison four times. She outlines Gene's pacifist beliefs, including his conviction that no law requiring people to prepare to kill can be morally justified. She also counters the stereotypical portrayal of antiwar activists by the media, (Note: Keyes's early insight into the mainstream media's dismissal of antiwar activists is supported by sociologist Todd Gitlin and historian Melvin Small. According to historian Chester J. Pach Jr., Gitlin and Small published research showing when it comes to "media coverage of the antiwar movement...reporters concentrated on the number of demonstrators or their appearance, rather than the arguments they made against US involvement in Vietnam." Pach also notes that "only on rare occasions...did network TV journalists question Johnson's decision to fight", with "much of the coverage of the US war effort on the network evening newscasts during 1965/1966...actually quite favorable.") describing them as a diverse group of people devoted to nonviolence and social change.

She examines Gene's upbringing, describing his numerous travails: his public condemnation by veterans and government officials, repeated imprisonment, and decision to reject a conventional career in favor of peace activism. She recounts her and her husband's initial frustration with Gene's choices, eventually coming to admire his commitment, leading them to also reconsider their own beliefs. Looking back, Keyes sees how the moral values they instilled in their son helped shape Gene's principles, even though he came to embrace those same ideals more completely than his own parents.

Keyes traces Gene's beliefs from his childhood, showing him as a thoughtful and independent boy with a compassion even for insects. As a college student, he was involved in the civil rights movement and community service, which impacted his academic performance. Keyes also notes her and her husband's inconsistency, alternating between encouragement and criticism towards Gene.

== Publication ==
The essay was first published in the October 1966 issue of McCall's magazine. At the time, McCall's was the most popular woman's magazine in the United States, (Note: See for example the 1966 supplement to the Association of National Advertisers, Inc. Magazine Circulation and Rate Trends, pp. 2, 3, 6, 7, as cited in the November 28, 1967, Congressional Record—Senate, pp. 33983, 34001.) both in terms of circulation and ad revenue. The cover story in that issue featured a preview of photographs taken by actor Roddy McDowell for his then-upcoming book Double Exposure.

While not the main story, Keyes's essay received high visibility, as it was placed towards the front of the magazine. It appeared across a total of six pages, beginning with the headline, "Suppose They Gave a War and No One Came". A subhead beneath it on the first page reads, "The mother of a draft-card burner, a young man already imprisoned four times for his beliefs, tells of her own agony—and her son's." A photograph of Gene, appearing clean-shaven, appears to the left of the headline. The image was previously taken several years earlier by American photographer Consuelo Kanaga.

No advertisements interfered with the first page; instead, the first page was preceded and followed by full page ads for lipstick by Du Barry cosmetics. The subsequent five pages of the essay jump towards the back of the magazine, with all five pages continuous and uninterrupted, while also adjoined by cartoons and advertisements on each page for the remainder of the story.

=== Distribution ===
After its original publication, the essay was reproduced and widely circulated. It was distributed as part of educational literature by American peace groups and used by counselors to help parents of draft resisters understand their children. Draft resistance and evasion groups like Clergy and Laymen Concerned about Vietnam (CALCAV), Committee for Nonviolent Action (CNVA), and a coalition of related groups, copied, reprinted, and distributed the essay to the public. Women's groups like the Washington State Federation of Women's Clubs also discussed the essay and recommended it to their board members.

== Origins ==
=== "A Modest Proposal" ===
From the late 1950s to the early 1960s, science writer and popularizer of mathematics James R. Newman wrote a series of letters to the editor (Note: For a secondary-source analysis of these letters, see Lauri Andström, Vaatimaton ehdotus: James R. Newmanin näkemykset ydinasekysymyksiin teoksessa The Rule of Folly (1962) [A Modest Proposal: James R. Newman’s Views on Nuclear Weapons Issues in The Rule of Folly (1962)], master's thesis, University of Helsinki, 2022. Andström examines Newman’s writings on nuclear weapons from 1954 to 1962, including his letters to The Washington Post.) warning the public about the dangers of a potential nuclear war. On September 25, 1961, one of these letters, titled "A Modest Proposal", written in a similar satirical vein as the essay of the same name by Jonathan Swift, proposed sending all of the children in the Northern Hemisphere to the Southern for safekeeping from a potential nuclear conflagration.

In the letter, Newman paraphrases and quotes a line from a poem by Carl Sandburg from memory, writing: "I recall a story which Carl Sandburg told of a little girl, perhaps his granddaughter, who, after hearing his description of a battle of the Civil War, observed, 'Suppose they gave a war and no one came.' There is no reason to suppose that children, unless forced, would come to our war." The letter was republished the next year in The Rule of Folly (1962), described on the cover as "a powerful and angry attack on the nuclear and civil defense policies that are leading the United States towards self-destruction".

=== The People, Yes ===
Newman's adaptation is slightly different from Sandburg's book length poem of The People, Yes (1936). Sandburg originally wrote:

The little girl saw her first troop parade and asked,
"What are those?"
"Soldiers."
"What are soldiers?"
"They are for war. They fight and each tries to kill
as many of the other side as he can."
The girl held still and studied.
"Do you know . . . I know something?"
"Yes, what is it you know?"
"Sometime they'll give a war and nobody will come."

Others have suggested that the phrase may instead have originated from an anecdote attributed to Thornton Wilder, while still others falsely misattributed the slogan to Bertolt Brecht. However, most philologists agree that its origins can be traced to Sandburg.

== History ==
=== Charlotte E. Keyes ===
According to her son Ralph, writer Charlotte Esther Keyes (née Shachmann) first read Newman's letter to The Washington Post in 1961 and kept a copy of it in her archives. Charlotte, who was known as "Chet", was born in 1914 and raised in Philadelphia. She studied social work in New York, and married Scott Keyes in 1938. Scott was an urban planner who received a PhD in Agricultural Economics from the University of Wisconsin.

Charlotte and her husband were longtime peace activists. Scott had become a member of the Progressive Party and later a Quaker, while Charlotte was part-Jewish, and active with the Fellowship of Reconciliation (FOR) during the 1950s. FOR, an interfaith peace and justice organization that emphasized nonviolence, published the magazine Fellowship, which featured Charlotte's poetry. (Note: Her antiwar poem "In the Museum" (1952) appeared in FOR's magazine, and anticipated her 1966 essay: "I've never shared with him the tomes / I've read or thoughts on war or death. / Yet gazing long with quiet breath / At the soldier dolls in museum case, / My five year old lifts tortured face— / 'They all have guns!' 'Of course they do.' / 'But why?' 'They have to shoot.' 'At who?'") In 1953, the family moved to Puerto Rico for six years after Scott was hired to work on the Operation Bootstrap project. Upon their return, they moved to Champaign, Illinois, where Scott served as a professor of Urban and Regional Planning at the University of Illinois for the next 17 years.

Charlotte continued writing poetry and magazine articles, as well as several books for young readers that were well received, including The Experimenter (1962), a biography of Ralph Waldo Emerson, and High on the Mainmast (1966), a biography of Herman Melville, both published by College & University Press.

=== Gene Keyes ===
Charlotte's son Gene was accepted to Harvard in 1959, but became active in the civil rights movement, protesting in favor of desegregation, which had an impact on his grades. He dropped out in early 1961. Keyes spent a total of 18 months (Note: Some sources report 19 months instead of 18.) in different jails for nonviolent resistance. He was on parole when his mother's essay was first published. Keyes eventually returned to academia, receiving his doctorate in International Relations at York University, Toronto, in 1978.

=== Women Strike for Peace ===
Charlotte became active as an organizer with Women Strike for Peace (WSP) in the 1960s. Unlike younger feminists of the time, the group focused on peace activism rooted in traditional motherhood rather than on gender equality, (Note: This would change by 1968 with the Jeannette Rankin Brigade marking the end of the traditional motherhood era of activism, with the women's liberation movement staging a "Burial of True Womanhood" at Arlington National Cemetery. By the late 1990s, WSP was mostly disbanded, with the establishment of Code Pink in 2002 as an inheritor of WSP's legacy, continuing their peace activism in a different, younger, more modern form.) as its members were primarily married, middle-aged, middle-class women with sons eligible for the draft. They originally organized around a ban on nuclear testing which later transitioned into ending the Vietnam War.

Charlotte received wider media coverage in 1964 when she was sponsored by the Champaign-Urbana Women For Peace to travel to The Hague for a WSP collaboration with the NATO Woman's Peace Force. They participated in a silent protest march against nuclear proliferation outside a meeting of the foreign ministers. At the protest, the group was joined by Olga Prinzessin zur Lippe-Biesterfeld, a member of the royal family, and peace activist Ava Helen Pauling, the wife of Linus Pauling.

According to historian Timothy H. Breen, "WSP demonstrated that the antiwar movement was not limited to the radical left and thus helped build a broad coalition against the war". Their reach expanded to draft resistance in the Vietnam War as the deaths of American soldiers began to rise. WSP agreed to make the issue of opposition to the draft their highest priority in 1966 during their national conference.

The year after Charlotte published her essay in McCall's, WSP released the "Women's Statement of Conscience and Complicity with Draft Resisters" (1967), declaring that women had a moral responsibility to support draft resisters, arguing that their refusal to serve was a principled response to an unjust war. "We believe it is not we, but those who send our sons to kill and be killed, who are committing crimes", they wrote.

== Analysis ==
Philip K. Tompkins, a scholar of organizational communication and former president of the International Communication Association, discusses the slogan within the framework of the philosophy of Kenneth Burke, explaining how the slogan is consistent with Burke's understanding of war and cooperation. Burke maintains that war depends upon countless acts of symbolic and social cooperation, making it "a disease or a perversion of communion." Tompkins argues that because war requires cooperation, it can also be challenged through non-cooperation. "Notice also that war is impossible without cooperation between allies and between enemies as well", writes Tompkins. "There was a profound meaning in the Vietnam-War-era question, 'what if they gave a war and nobody came?' Because humans by their very nature respond cooperatively to symbols, it takes a special effort to practice non-cooperation."

== Impact ==
=== Cultural influence ===
The essay's title became a well known antiwar slogan of the 1960s. A bumper sticker was later created based on the question: "What if they gave a war and nobody came?" The sticker entered popular culture in America, with newscaster David Brinkley holding it up in front of millions of viewers on the nightly news.

Princteon protest poster, n.d.

Artists and musicians created many works connected to the slogan. One of the earliest known is held by the National Museum of American History at the Smithsonian. Titled Suppose They Gave A War And Nobody Came, the date and author is unknown although it is credited to Bradford Lyttle. The item is categorized as an anti-Vietnam war protest poster that features a variation of the popular slogan from Princeton. The poster also has a peace symbol associated with nuclear disarmament.

Other versions of non-protest poster art featuring the slogan and a distinct visual arts theme include Gino Beghe's painting that was turned into poster art titled What if they gave a war and nobody came... (1969). Beghe's poster, which is held by the Library of Congress in their Yanker Poster Collection, shows a serene field of flowers surrounded by mountains in the distance. In the center of the poster, a scarecrow made out of the accoutrements of war, has birds resting on its rusted implements. The Whitney Museum of American Art also holds a reprint of a psychedelic poster by an unknown artist that features the slogan Suppose They Gave A War...and Nobody Came as the title. The date is also unknown, but is believed to have been created before 1970.

The antiwar slogan was later appropriated and subverted by former Armed Forces Radio Service entertainer Hy Averback, who directed a pro-military comedy film titled Suppose They Gave a War and Nobody Came (1970), which was produced by the American Broadcasting Company. The film falsely marketed itself to members of the counterculture with a slogan they would recognize and the use of a peace symbol in the film's advertising campaign.

In Germany, the slogan circulated in several forms, including Stell dir vor, es gibt Krieg, und keiner geht hin and Stell dir vor, es ist Krieg, und keiner geht hin. Anecdotal reports indicate it was first seen as graffiti in Hamburg, West Germany, in the mid to late 1970s. Artist Johannes Hartmann used the slogan for poster art in the 1980s, selling copies to the German Evangelical Church Assembly. Some Germans on the left took issue with the slogan, attacking it as reactionary.

== See also ==
- Make love, not war – Anti-war and peace slogan
- War is not healthy for children and other living things – Anti-war and peace slogan

== Sources ==
=== Archival collections ===
- Keyes, Ralph (February 17, 2015). "Keyes, Scott". Progressive Party Records. The University of Iowa Libraries.

=== Books ===
- Appy, Christian G. (2015). American Reckoning: The Vietnam War and Our National Conscience. Viking. ISBN 9780143128342. OCLC 1007241496.
- Breen, T. H. (1996). "Charlotte Keyes, 'Suppose They Gave a War and No One Came' (1966)". The Power of Words: Documents in American History. Vol. II: From 1865. HarperCollins. ISBN 9780065011128. OCLC 32545020.
- Erickson, Hal (2012). Military Comedy Films: A Critical Survey and Filmography of Hollywood Releases Since 1918. McFarland & Co. ISBN 9780786492671. OCLC 806039873.
- Friends Meeting at Cambridge (1971). Conscientious objection information (Manuscript). Special Collections and University Archives, University of Massachusetts Amherst Libraries. MS 902 C363.
- Keyes, Gene S. (2013). "Gene S. Keyes". Harvard and Radcliffe Class of 1963: Fiftieth Anniversary Report. Printed for the Class. OCLC 841094368.
- Keyes, Ralph (1992). Sons on Fathers: A Book of Men's Writing. HarperCollins Publishers. ISBN 9780060168674. OCLC 1037556468.
- Keyes, Ralph (2006). The Quote Verifier: Who Said What, Where, and When. St. Martin's Griffin. ISBN 9780312340049. OCLC 61879763.
- Keyes, Scott (1949). Housing Market Areas in the United States: Number, Size, Geographical Distribution, and Recent Growth, with Special Reference to Economic Implications (PhD). University of Wisconsin.
- Lynd, Alice (1968). We Won't Go: Personal Accounts of War Objectors. Beacon Press. OCLC 299667.
- Newman, James R. (1962). The Rule of Folly. Simon and Schuster. OCLC 1474640329.
- Pach, Chester J., Jr. (2002). "The War on Television: TV News, the Johnson Administration, and Vietnam". In Young, Marilyn Blatt; Buzzanco, Robert (eds.). A Companion to the Vietnam War. Blackwell Publishing. doi:10.1002/9780470997178. ISBN 9780631210139. OCLC 1057998502.
- Rees, Nigel (2002) [1997]. Mark My Words: Great Quotations and the Stories Behind Them. Barnes & Noble. ISBN 9780760735329. OCLC 1200486184.
- Sandburg, Carl (1964) [1936]. The People, Yes. Harcourt, Brace and Company. ISBN 9780544416925. OCLC 900606927.
- Schneidhorst, Amy C. (2013) [2011]. Building a Just and Secure World: Popular Front Women's Struggle for Peace and Justice in Chicago during the 1960s. Bloomsbury. ISBN 9781623565756. OCLC 828495216.
- Swerdlow, Amy (1992). ""Not My Son, Not Your Son, Not Their Sons": Mothers Against the Draft for Vietnam". In Tischler, Barbara L. (ed.). Sights on the Sixties. Rutgers University Press. ISBN 9780813517926. OCLC 24215094.
- Swerdlow, Amy (1993). Women Strike for Peace: Traditional Motherhood and Radical Politics in the 1960s. University of Chicago Press. ISBN 9780226786353. OCLC 27770968.
- Taylor, Ethel Barol (1998). We Made a Difference: My Personal Journey with Women Strike for Peace. Camino Books. ISBN 9780940159495. OCLC 39060683.
- Weber, David R. (1978). "Charlotte E. Keyes: "'Suppose They Gave a War and No One Came'" (1966)". Civil Disobedience in America: A Documentary History. Cornell University Press. ISBN 9780801410055. OCLC 3540396.
- Zuckerman, Mary Ellen (1998). A History of Popular Women's Magazines in the United States, 1792–1995. Greenwood Press. ISBN 9780313306754. OCLC 37836947.

=== Conferences ===
- Tompkins, Phillip K. (November 1989). Kenneth Burke's 'Missing' Ethic. Annual Meeting of the Speech Communication Association (75th, San Francisco, CA, November 18–21, 1989). Viewpoints (120) -- Speeches/Conference Papers (150). OCLC 425878665. ED 315 803.

=== Dissertations and theses ===
- Andström, Lauri (2022). Vaatimaton ehdotus: James R. Newmanin näkemykset ydinasekysymyksiin teoksessa The Rule of Folly (1962) (Master's thesis). University of Helsinki.
- Keyes, Gene (1978). Strategic Nonviolent Defense in Theory: Denmark in Practice (PhD thesis). York University.

=== Journals ===
- Keyes, Ralph (Fall 2012). "My Father's FBI File". The Antioch Review. 70 (4). Antioch College: 731–741. ISSN 0003-5769.
- Rubin, Michael (2018). "How the Ayatollahs Battle America". International Journal of Intelligence and CounterIntelligence. 31 (4). doi:10.1080/08850607.2018.1490586.

=== Magazines ===
- Hartmann, Johannes (6 February 2016). "Graffiti: 'Stell Dir vor, es ist Krieg, und Keiner geht hin'". Der Spiegel (in German).
- Keyes, Charlotte E. (October 1966). "Suppose They Gave a War and No One Came". McCall's. 94 (1): 26, 187–191.

=== Newspapers ===
- Alexander, Carol (May 1, 1970). "'Better be killed than kill'". The Southern Illinoisan. Vol. 78, no. 103.
- "Board to Hold Better World Discussion". The News Tribune. February 22, 1967.
- Payne, Karen (July 4, 1980). "Uncle Sam wants you—again!". Illinois Times. pp. 3–4.
- Nuzum, Thomas (14 May 1964). "Women Picket NATO Meeting". Chicago Tribune.

=== Protest art and ephemera ===
- "Suppose They Gave A War...and Nobody Came, c. 1960–1970". Whitney Museum of American Art. 2018.
- "Suppose They Gave A War And Nobody Came" (Poster). National Museum of American History. Smithsonian. 1986.0116.132.
- Beghe, Gino (c. 1969). "What if they gave a war and nobody came..." Library of Congress Prints and Photographs Online Catalog. Yanker Poster Collection. Library of Congress.
