= Sandy Faison =

American actress and singer

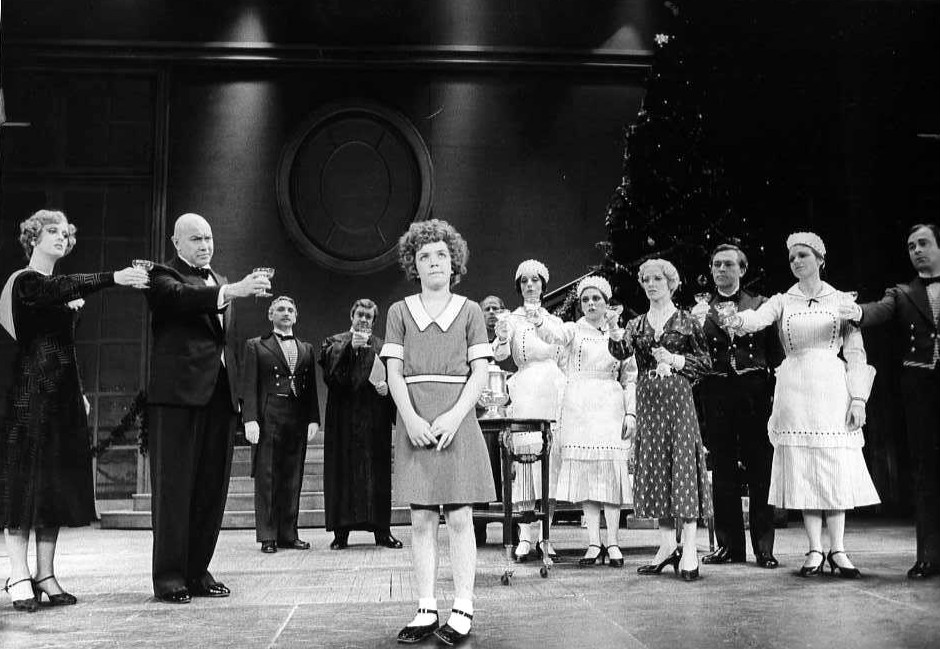
- In Annie (1977). Sandy Faison (left); Reid Shelton as Daddy Warbucks, Andrea McArdle in title role
- Born: Sandra Faison; United States
- Occupations: Actress, singer; acting teacher
- Years active: 1977–present

Sandra Faison is an American actress and singer. She became an acting teacher after her performing career.

== Career ==
=== Acting ===
In 1977, she made her Broadway debut as Grace Farrell, secretary to Daddy Warbucks, in Annie. Additional theatre credits include Charlie and Algernon (1980), Is There Life After High School? (1982), and You Can't Take It with You (1983, replacement Alice Sycamore)

Faison's feature film credits include The Sterile Cuckoo (1969) and All the Right Moves (1983).

On television she was featured in the soap operas The Guiding Light as the original Brandy Shellooe before actress JoBeth Williams took over the role, Another World, and The Edge of Night. She had a recurring role in The Days and Nights of Molly Dodd as Molly's sister Mamie, a regular role in the first season of Anything but Love, and made guest appearances on Scarecrow and Mrs. King, Quantum Leap, The Wonder Years, Grace Under Fire and Party of Five, among others

In the television movie An Eight Is Enough Wedding (1989), she played Abby Bradford.

=== Teaching ===
After 13 years, Faison retired from teaching at Fiorello H. LaGuardia High School. where she also served as LaGuardia's assistant principal of theater for her last five years. As of 2021, she teaches an annual workshop at London's Royal Academy of Music, is the artistic director for the ArtsBridge Summer Musical Theater 2, and teaches the second year acting and music students at the Neighborhood Playhouse School of the Theatre in New York City.

== Filmography ==
=== Film ===
Year	Title	Role	Notes
1969	The Sterile Cuckoo	Nancy Putnam	Uncredited
1983	All the Right Moves	Suzie	
1992	Play Nice	Mrs. Holland	

=== Television ===
Year	Title	Role	Notes
1976	Street Killing	Susan Brenner	Television film
1976	Serpico	Sara	Episode: "Country Box"
1977	The Annie Christmas Show	Grace Farrell	Television film
1977	Guiding Light	Brandy Shellooe #1	1 episode
1979	Another World	Ramona / Model	1 episode
1983–1984	The Edge of Night	Dr. Beth Corell	185 episodes
1985	Scarecrow and Mrs. King	Jean Kearsley	Episode: "Vigilante Mothers"
1987	Time Out for Dad	Pam Kowalski	Television film
1987–1988	The Days and Nights of Molly Dodd	Mamie Grolnick	10 episodes
1988	CBS Summer Playhouse	Felicity	Episode: "Old Money"
1989	Anything but Love	Pamela Payton-Finch	6 episodes
1989	An Eight Is Enough Wedding	Abby Bradford	Television film
1990	Coach	Beverly Graustark	Episode: "The Break-Up"
1991	Quantum Leap	Emma Rickett	Episode: "Runaway - July 4, 1964"
1991	Pros and Cons	Janet	Episode: "May the Best Man Win"
1992	CBS Schoolbreak Special	Emily Lance	Episode: "Two Teens and a Baby"
1992	The Wonder Years	June Aidem	Episode: "Of Mastodons and Men"
1995	Mrs. Holland	Kimberly Hartford	Episode: "Grace at the Campfire"
1997	The Westing Game	Grace Wexler	Television film
1997	Party of Five	Sally	Episode: "Past Imperfect"
