= Rain Man (disambiguation) =

Rain Man is a 1988 American road comedy-drama film.

Rain Man may also refer to:

- Rain Man (soundtrack), a 1989 album of the 1988 film
- Rain Man, a 1989 novelization of the 1988 film by Leonore Fleischer
- "Rain Man", song by Eminem, from Encore
- Rainman (wrestler), a ring name of professional wrestler Kory Chavis
- The hanafuda card depicting a figure with an umbrella
- Rain Man, an American producer formerly a member of Krewella
