= Annie (musical) =

Broadway musical

- Original Broadway windowcard
- Music: Charles Strouse
- Lyrics: Martin Charnin
- Book: Thomas Meehan
- Basis: Little Orphan Annie by Harold Gray
- Productions: 1976 Goodspeed Opera House; 1977 Broadway; 1978 West End; 1978 North American tour 1982 West End revival 1997 Broadway revival 1998 West End revival 2000 UK tour 2005 US tour 2006 UK tour 2011 UK tour 2012 Broadway revival 2014 US tour 2015 UK tour 2017 West End revival 2019 UK tour 2022 US tour 2023 UK tour 2023 US tour 2026 UK tour
- Awards: Tony Award for Best Musical; Tony Award for Best Original Score; Tony Award for Best Book of a Musical

Annie is a musical with music by Charles Strouse, lyrics by Martin Charnin, and a book by Thomas Meehan. It is based on the 1924 comic strip Little Orphan Annie by Harold Gray (which in turn was inspired from the poem Little Orphant Annie by James Whitcomb Riley). The original Broadway production opened in 1977 and ran for nearly six years, setting a record for the Alvin Theatre (now the Neil Simon Theatre). It spawned numerous productions in many countries, as well as national tours, and won seven Tony Awards, including for Best Musical. The musical's songs "Tomorrow" and "It's the Hard Knock Life" are among its most popular musical numbers.

== Background ==
Martin Charnin first approached Thomas Meehan to write the book of a musical about Little Orphan Annie in 1972. Meehan researched, by rereading prints of the comic strip, but he was unable to find any satisfactory material for a musical, other than the characters of Annie, Oliver Warbucks, and Sandy, so, he decided to write his own story. As Meehan, Charnin, and Charles Strouse were all from New York, and given what he saw as the downbeat mood of the then-current Nixon era and Vietnam War, Meehan set his story in New York during the similarly downbeat Great Depression. Meehan saw the character of Annie as a 20th-century American female version of the main orphan characters created by Charles Dickens in works such as Oliver Twist and David Copperfield, with the mystery of Annie's abandonment and unknown parenthood as consistent with a strand of mysteries in Dickens' tales. Meehan's book was accepted by Charnin and Strouse, but considerable material had to be trimmed out – material which Meehan would later restore for his novelization.

== Plot ==
=== Act 1 ===
In 1933 New York City, eleven-year-old Annie sleeps in an orphanage, with many other girls her age. When six-year-old Molly wakes up from a bad dream, Annie comforts her by singing about her own parents; even though they abandoned her at the orphanage as a baby, she holds on to the hope that they will come back for her ("Maybe"). Annie decides to escape to find her parents, but is caught by Miss Hannigan, the cruel keeper of the orphanage. To punish Annie's behavior, she forces all the girls to clean, and they lament the terrible conditions of the orphanage ("It's the Hard Knock Life"). Later on, Bundles the laundry man comes in to pick up the blankets, allowing Annie to escape in his truck. Miss Hannigan realizes she is gone and chases after the truck. The other orphans cheer her on but await punishment when Hannigan returns ("It's the Hard Knock Life (Reprise)").

Annie escapes, running into a friendly stray dog. She tells him of better days to come ("Tomorrow"). She fools a police officer named Lt. Ward into believing he is her dog, named Sandy. Later, Annie and Sandy stumble upon a Hooverville, a shanty town full of formerly well-off people suddenly rendered homeless by the Great Depression. They sarcastically toast the former president ("We'd Like to Thank You, Herbert Hoover"). The shanty town is broken up by the cops and Lt. Ward take Annie back to the orphanage, where Miss Hannigan punishes her with extra chores.

At the orphanage, Miss Hannigan vents her frustration at being surrounded by children ("Little Girls"). Grace Farrell, the assistant to the billionaire Oliver Warbucks, comes to the orphanage, asking for an orphan to spend Christmas at his mansion. Seeing how poorly Miss Hannigan treats Annie, Grace insists on taking her ("Little Girls (Reprise)").

At Warbucks's mansion, Grace introduces Annie to the staff and explains that she will have every luxury available ("I Think I'm Gonna Like It Here"). Oliver Warbucks returns and is not happy to have Annie in his mansion, having assumed all orphans were boys. Warbucks instructs Grace to take her to a movie while he works, but when he realizes that Annie has never seen New York, he decides to take her there himself, walking the 45 blocks to the Roxy and seeing New York City in all of its glory ("N.Y.C.").

Grace pays Miss Hannigan a visit to tell her that Warbucks wants to officially adopt Annie. Hannigan becomes furiously envious that the orphan she hated so much will suddenly have everything. Her ne'er-do-well brother Rooster and his girlfriend, Lily, drop by, in hopes of a handout. When Miss Hannigan mentions that Annie is going to be adopted by Warbucks, Rooster realizes they can use this situation to their advantage to bring Annie back to Miss Hannigan ("Easy Street").

Having noticed a broken locket around Annie's neck, Warbucks buys her a new, more expensive one from Tiffany's. When he offers Annie the locket and attempts to take off the old one, Annie bursts into tears, as the locket was the only thing left to her by her parents, and she still holds out hope that they will return for her. Warbucks pledges to find her parents, no matter what it takes, calling J. Edgar Hoover to get the Federal Bureau of Investigation on the job ("You Won't Be an Orphan for Long"/"Maybe (Reprise)").

=== Act 2 ===
Annie appears on Bert Healy's radio show ("Maybe (Reprise)"), where Warbucks announces that he is offering $50,000 to the couple who can prove they are her parents. Healy sings a song with the Boylan Sisters ("You're Never Fully Dressed Without a Smile"). At the orphanage, the girls are listening to the show. They joyously sing along ("You're Never Fully Dressed Without a Smile (Reprise)").

A couple claiming to be Annie's parents, Ralph and Shirley Mudge, arrive at the orphanage. In fact, they are Rooster and Lily in disguise. They believe they can pass themselves off as Annie's parents, with Hannigan's help, for which she demands half of the money ("Easy Street (Reprise)").

Warbucks brings Annie to Washington, D.C., where she meets President Franklin D. Roosevelt. Roosevelt and his Cabinet are inspired by her optimism and decide to make it a cornerstone of their administration ("Tomorrow (Reprise)").

Once back home, Warbucks tells Annie how much he loves her ("Something Was Missing"). Because all the people claiming to be her parents were frauds, he offers to adopt her, and Annie gleefully accepts. The delighted staff get Annie dressed for the formal adoption proceedings and tell of how her arrival has changed their lives ("Annie"). As Judge Louis Brandeis shows up to begin the adoption proceedings, Warbucks and Annie dance together ("I Don't Need Anything But You"). They are interrupted by Rooster and Lily in disguise. The two present forged documents, as well as the other half of Annie's locket, seemingly confirming their story. Warbucks requests that she be allowed to stay one more night, and they can take her away on Christmas morning.

The next morning, Annie wonders if her life with her parents will really be as good as her life with Warbucks could have been ("Maybe (Reprise)"). Warbucks receives a surprise visit from Roosevelt and his Secret Service. The FBI has learned that Annie's parents are actually David and Margaret Bennett, who died long ago in a fire when Annie was a baby. Mr. and Mrs. "Mudge" show up to take Annie along with the money but are quickly revealed to be none other than Rooster and Lily; the Secret Service arrests them, along with Miss Hannigan, for their crimes.

Annie is officially adopted by Warbucks, who notes that this Christmas is the beginning of a new life for them, for the orphans (all of whom are adopted by wealthy friends of Warbucks) and for the rest of the country, thanks to Roosevelt's New Deal ("A New Deal for Christmas").

== Characters ==
Source: MTI Shows

Characters	Description
Oliver Warbucks	Billionaire businessman who opens his home – and his heart – to Annie.
Annie	The title character. The spunky and optimistic 11-year-old orphan who is looking for her birth parents. She ends up getting adopted by Oliver Warbucks.
Grace Farrell	Oliver Warbucks' faithful secretary, who loves Annie from the start.
Miss Hannigan	The disillusioned orphanage matron. She hates children (whom she abuses with household chores and overprotects, until they reach adulthood), but is fond of alcoholic beverages. When Annie goes to Warbucks, she counts on her younger brother, Rooster, and his girlfriend, Lily, to bring her back to prevent her from getting adopted.
Rooster Hannigan	Miss Hannigan's younger brother, a convict who escaped jail, so he could plot to abduct Annie and bring her back to his sister.
Lily St. Regis	Rooster's girlfriend, an egotistical gold digger. She and Rooster pose as Annie's "parents", so they can fool Warbucks and get their hands on a $50,000 reward.
Drake	The butler at the Warbucks Mansion; a good friend to Grace, Annie and Warbucks.
Franklin D. Roosevelt	President of the United States, he aids Warbucks in the search for Annie's parents. Upon meeting Annie, he is inspired to make a new deal and restore America's economy.
Molly	The youngest orphan, Annie's best friend. Spunky and really wants a family. 6 years old.
Pepper	The bossiest orphan, who likes to take control and is rivals with Annie. A bully who tends to complain and roughhouse. 12 years old.
Duffy	The oldest orphan, who often hangs around with Pepper. 13 years old.
July	The quietest orphan, who is mother-like to all the other orphans. 13 years old.
Tessie	The crybaby orphan, who is known for the line "Oh my goodness". 10 years old.
Kate	The shyest orphan, who rarely speaks but has a mischievous side. Enjoys playing tricks on Miss Hannigan. 7 years old.
Louis Brandeis	Associate Justice of the U.S. Supreme Court. He is called upon to assist in Annie's adoption.
Bert Healy	Radio announcer who agrees to broadcast Annie's search for her parents.
The Boylan Sisters	Singers on the Bert Healy Show who hope to be famous someday.
Fred McCracken and Wacky	A ventriloquist and his dummy, who are guests on Bert Healy's Oxydent Hour of Smiles.
Lt. Ward	A police officer who encounters Annie on the street, finds her in the local Shantytown, Hooverville, and returns her to Miss Hannigan.
Sandy	An abandoned mixed-breed dog that, once Annie rescues him, becomes her companion and pet.
Bundles	The laundry man who initially helps Annie escape by accident.
Cordell Hull, Frances Perkins, Louis Howe, Harold Ickes, and Henry Morgenthau Jr.	Franklin Roosevelt's Cabinet members who sing "Tomorrow (Reprise)" with Warbucks and Annie.
Star-To-Be	An upcoming Broadway star, who sings a solo in "N.Y.C."
Mrs. Greer, Mrs. Pugh, Cecile, and Annette	Warbucks's servants. They do a lot of housekeeping and are often supervised by Drake and Grace.
Dog Catcher and Assistant Dog Catcher	Characters who try to catch Sandy.
Sophie and the Apple Seller	Child citizens of Hooverville.
Kaltenborn and Radio Announcers	Announcers on the radio.
Usherette	A female usher who seats Annie, Grace, and Warbucks in the movie theater.
Jimmy Johnson	A guest on Bert Healy's Oxydent Hour of Smiles, who calls himself "radio's only masked announcer".
SFX Man	A member of Bert Healy's radio show, who controls the sound effects for the show and encourages crowd participation.
Men and Women of Hooverville	Men and women who are homeless and live in shanties in the town of Hooverville.

== Notable casts ==
Character	Broadway	West End	US tour	Broadway revival	West End revival	Broadway revival	Hollywood Bowl	National tour
Character	1977	1978	1978	1997	1998	2012	2018	2022–2025
Annie	Andrea McArdle	Andrea McArdle	Kathy Jo Kelly	Brittny Kissinger	Charlene Barton Tasha-Jay Gold Libby Gore Sophie McShera	Lilla Crawford	Kaylin Hedges	Ellie Rose Pulsifer Hazel Vogel
Oliver Warbucks	Reid Shelton	Stratford Johns	Norwood Smith	Conrad John Schuck	Kevin Colson	Anthony Warlow	David Alan Grier	Christopher Swan
Miss Hannigan	Dorothy Loudon	Sheila Hancock	Jane Connell	Nell Carter	Lesley Joseph	Katie Finneran	Ana Gasteyer	Stefanie Londino Whoopi Goldberg
Grace Farrell	Sandy Faison	Judith Paris	Kathryn Boulé	Colleen Dunn	Kate Normington	Brynn O'Malley	Lea Salonga	Julia Nicole Hunter
Rooster Hannigan	Robert Fitch	Kenneth Nelson	Gary Beach	Jim Ryan	Andrew Kennedy	Clarke Thorell	Roger Bart	Rhett Guter
Lily St. Regis	Barbara Erwin	Clovissa Newcombe	Lisa Raggio	Karen Byers-Blackwell	Gail Marie Sharpter	J. Elaine Marcos	Megan Hilty	Isabella De Souza Moore

=== Notable Broadway replacements ===
Original Broadway

- Annie: Shelley Bruce, Sarah Jessica Parker, Allison Smith, Diana Barrows, Kristen Vigard
- Warbucks: Keene Curtis, Harve Presnell, Rhodes Reason, Conrad John Schuck
- Miss Hannigan: Alice Ghostley, Betty Hutton, Ruth Kobart, Marcia Lewis, Dolores Wilson, June Havoc, Henrietta Valor
- Grace: Anne Kerry, Lynne Wintersteller
- Rooster: Gary Beach
- Lily: Rita Rudner

2012 Broadway revival

- Annie: Taylor Richardson, Sadie Sink
- Warbucks: Ron Raines
- Miss Hannigan: Jane Lynch, Faith Prince
- Grace: Jenni Barber
- Lily: Kirsten Wyatt, Anneliese van der Pol

== Production history ==
The New York Times estimates that Annie is performed 700 to 900 times, each year, in the United States.

=== Pre-Broadway tryout ===
Annie had its world premiere on August 10, 1976, at the Goodspeed Opera House in East Haddam, Connecticut, under the direction of Michael P. Price. Kristen Vigard was the first actress to play the title role. However, the producers soon decided that Vigard's genuinely sweet interpretation was not tough enough for the street-smart orphan. After a week of performances, Vigard was replaced by Andrea McArdle, who had been playing one of the other orphans, Pepper. Vigard went on to become McArdle's Broadway alternate.

After the Goodspeed run ended, the role of Miss Hannigan was also recast, as original actor Maggie Task's performance was considered too mean. Producer Mike Nichols suggested comedy actress Dorothy Loudon to bring the humour out of the role; in rehearsals, Loudon reportedly improvised numerous elements, including the lines "Do I hear happiness in here?" and "Why any kid would want to be an orphan, I'll never know."

=== Broadway original run ===
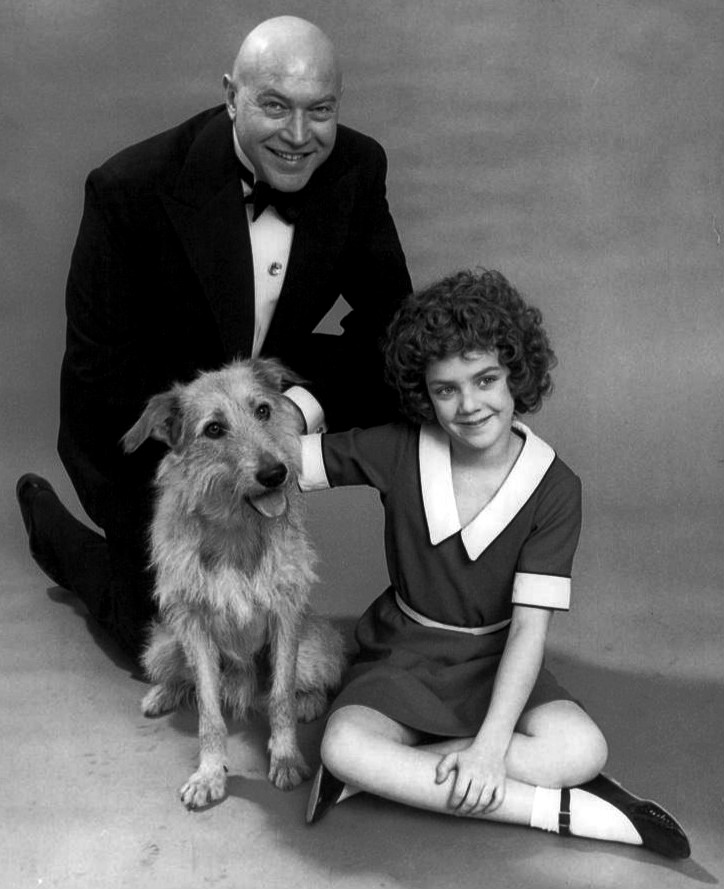
Andrea McArdle, Reid Shelton and Sandy, 1977

The original Broadway production opened at the Alvin Theatre on April 21, 1977, and starred Andrea McArdle as Annie, Reid Shelton as Warbucks, Dorothy Loudon as Miss Hannigan, and Sandy Faison as Grace Farrell, with Danielle Brisebois as Molly, the youngest and smallest orphan. It was nominated for eleven Tony Awards and won seven, including the Best Musical, Best Score, and Best Book at the 31st Tony Awards. Replacements in the title role on Broadway included Shelley Bruce, Sarah Jessica Parker, Allison Smith and Alyson Kirk. Replacements in the role of Miss Hannigan included Alice Ghostley, Dolores Wilson, Betty Hutton, Marcia Lewis, and June Havoc. Ann Ungar understudied and played for Dorothy Loudon in the role of Miss Hannigan. She also understudied Alice Ghostley and Dolores Wilson. Annie was evicted from the Alvin Theatre, in September 1981, to make way for Merrily We Roll Along, which began its months long journey to finding a new permanent home. On September 16, the show moved to ANTA (now the August Wilson), knowing the production would need to move, again, due to contractual obligations to the new musical Oh Brother! On October 29, Annie moved to the Eugene O'Neill Theatre, and finally moved to its final home at the Uris (now the Gershwin) on December 12 to make room for a revised Little Me. This move was made possible, partly because of the early closing of the revival of My Fair Lady, had originally been scheduled to run through the end of that year. The show closed on January 2, 1983, after a total of 2,377 performances, setting a record for the longest-running show at the Alvin Theatre (now the Neil Simon Theatre), until it was surpassed by Hairspray in 2009.

=== United States national touring companies ===
During the Broadway run of Annie, there were four touring companies that were launched from the original production to tour to major North American cities:

The first national touring company opened in Toronto in March 1978 with Kathy Jo Kelly as Annie, Norwood Smith as Daddy Warbucks, Jane Connell, Ruth Kobart as Miss Hannigan, and Gary Beach as Rooster. It played in Miami from April 12 to May 13, 1978, then continued for a few more cities until it landed in Chicago where it played for 32 weeks. In April 1979, it continued on the road in with Mary K. Lombardi now in the lead as Annie. In the fall of 1980, Theda Stemler took over the part and was replaced in Boston when she grew too old. On May 15, 1981, Louanne Sirota, who had played Annie in the long-running Los Angeles production, took over the role for four months. In August 1981, Becky Snyder became the company's last Annie, closing the tour on September 6, 1981.

The second national touring company (sometimes referred to as the West Coast or Los Angeles production) opened in San Francisco on June 22, 1978, with Patricia Ann Patts starring as Annie, Jennifer Cihi as Pepper and the then-unknown Molly Ringwald as one of the orphans. The show landed in Los Angeles on October 15, 1978, for an open-ended run at the Shubert Theatre. Children's television host Tom Hatten played Franklin D. Roosevelt. On June 12, 1979, Sirota, just 9 years old (up until that time, all Annies had been 11 or older), took over the role from Patts. Marisa Morell took the role in December 1979, closing the Los Angeles run and continuing on tour with the show through December 1980. Kristi Coombs (who played the youngest orphan Molly in the first national touring company) then played Annie, until this touring company closed in Hawaii on August 22, 1982. Alyssa Milano played orphan Kate in 1981.

The third national touring company opened in Dallas on October 3, 1979, with Rosanne Sorrentino (who would later go on to portray Pepper in the 1982 film version) in the title role. This company toured to 23 cities playing mostly shorter runs of a month or less. On March 27, 1981, Bridget Walsh took over as Annie. Becky Snyder (who had closed the first national tour) joined this company in the summer of 1982 and stayed with it until it closed in September of that year.

The fourth national touring company opened on September 11, 1981, with Mollie Hall playing Annie. This production was a "bus and truck" tour, with a slightly reduced cast, that traveled the country and often played in two cities a week. This company was still touring when the original Broadway production closed in January 1983, making Kathleen Sisk the final performer to play Annie from the original production team. This tour closed in late March 1983.

=== West End original run ===
The musical premiered in the West End at the Victoria Palace Theatre on May 3, 1978. Andrea McArdle, the original Broadway Annie, played the title role for 40 performances. British 12-year-old Ann Marie Gwatkin was also cast in the title role and appeared on the original London cast recording. The opening night cast and the original cast album recording of children were Claire Hood, Jane Collins, Dawn Napier, Annette Mason, Helen Stephenson, Jackie Ekers and Linda Brewis. Ann Marie Gwatkin alternated with Christine Hyland, and four other Annies were cast at this point: Anne O'Rourke, Jacinta Whyte, Helen Thorne, Tracy Taylor, who were to play the role over the next year. Suzie Kemeys from South Wales also performed two shows in 1980/81. The first was as July and the second was Annie. ITV Wales commissioned two documentaries about this young Welsh girl and her rise from obscurity to a West End leading lady. Following this, Ann Marie Gwatkin and Jackie Ekers shared the title role, followed by many other casts of Annie. Miss Hannigan was originally played by Sheila Hancock, and later by Maria Charles and Stella Moray; Warbucks was played by Stratford Johns and later by Charles West, with Deborah Clarke playing Pepper in the first year and Melanie Grant playing Molly.

Annie closed on November 28, 1981, after 1,485 performances.

=== UK tour ===
The musical transferred to the Bristol Hippodrome for a special Christmas season before touring Britain. Because of strict British employment laws for juvenile actors, a succession of actresses took on the lead role every four months. One of the last girls to perform the role at the Victoria Palace before the show went on tour was 10-year-old Claudia Bradley from Leeds, who was featured on a 1981 BBC program called Fame. She went on to perform on the tour as well.

=== 1997 Broadway revival ===
A 20th anniversary Broadway revival, which played at the Martin Beck Theatre (now called the Al Hirschfeld Theatre) in 1997, entitled Annie, the 20th Anniversary, starred Nell Carter as Miss Hannigan, but controversy surrounded the casting of the titular character. The original actress cast in the role, Joanna Pacitti, was fired and replaced by Brittny Kissinger (who had been playing orphan July) just two weeks before her Broadway debut, while battling bronchitis in Boston. The pre-Broadway tour was playing the Colonial Theatre, when Joanna became sick with bronchitis and missed a few performances. Alexandra Kiesman, the swing orphan and Annie understudy went on the first night Pacitti was out and then the production decided to test Brittny Kissinger in the role, as she'd been rehearsing as a second understudy. The tour then moved on to Hershey, Pennsylvania, where Kissinger (now listed in the Playbill as a second understudy for Annie) performed again in the lead role while Pacitti was out sick.

The Hershey tour stop proved to be Pacitti's last performance in the show on February 23, 1997. The next tour stop was Oakdale in Connecticut where an insert was placed in the pre-printed programs displaying Pacitti as Annie that read "The role of Annie is now being played by Brittny Kissinger.” Public sentiment seemed to side with Pacitti as she was the winner of a highly publicized contest to find a new Annie, sponsored by the department store Macy's. This incident, coupled with the mixed reviews the new staging garnered, doomed it to a short run, although it was followed by a successful national tour. Kissinger, then 8, became the youngest actress to ever play Annie on Broadway.

More controversy surrounding the show involved Nell Carter. Carter reportedly was very upset when commercials promoting the show used a different actress, Marcia Lewis, a white actress, as Miss Hannigan. The producers claimed that the commercials, which were made during an earlier production, were too costly to reshoot. Carter felt that racism played a part in the decision. "Maybe they do not want audiences to know Nell Carter is black", she told the New York Post. However, the ads did mention that Carter was in the show. "It hurts a lot", Carter told the Post, "I've asked them nicely to stop it — it's insulting to me as a black woman." Later reports stated that "Nell Carter of Broadway's Annie denied Thursday that she called her show's producers racist because they chose to air commercials featuring a previous Miss Hannigan—who is white—instead of her." Her statement, released by the Associated Press, read: "'Yes, it is true that I and my representatives have gone to management on more than one occasion about the commercial and were told that there was nothing they could do about it,' Carter said in a statement Thursday. 'Therefore, I have resigned myself to the fact that this is the way it is.' The statement also addressed the alleged charges of racism, first published in Thursday's New York Post. Carter is black. 'I, Nell Carter, never, ever, ever accused my producers or anyone in the show of racism,' she said. Producers have said it is too expensive to film a new commercial." Carter was later replaced by another white actress, Sally Struthers. The revival closed on October 19, 1997, after 14 previews and 239 performances.

=== 1998 West End revival ===
The show was revived at the Victoria Palace Theatre, running from September 30, 1998, to February 28, 1999. It starred Lesley Joseph and then Lily Savage (the female alter ego of comedian Paul O'Grady) as Miss Hannigan and Kevin Colson as Warbucks. The young girls who played Annie were Charlene Barton, Tasha-Jay Gold, Libby Gore and Sophie McShera. Orphans included Dominique Moore as documented on Paddington Green.

=== 1999–2000 US tour ===
Starting in August 1999, the post Broadway national tour continued with Meredith Anne Bull as Annie. In the spring of 2000, Ashley Wieronski, who had been playing Duffy, moved up to play Annie. In July 2000, Dana Benedict took over as Annie.

=== 2000–2001 Australian tour ===
In 2000/2001, a tour was staged in Sydney, Melbourne, and Brisbane. Anthony Warlow starred as Warbucks with Amanda Muggleton as Miss Hannigan. A new song, "Why Should I Change a Thing", was written for Warlow. Appearing as Annie in the Sydney production were Rachel Marley and Jodie McGaw. A publicist noted that "each time the show moves to a new city, two casts of seven orphans plus two Annies have to be found to join the adult cast."

=== 2001–2010 UK tours ===
Further UK tours of the show were also staged, including a one-month run at The Theatre Royal in Lincoln in 2001. Members of the original cast included Kate Winney and Jemma Carlisle as Annie, Louise English (Grace), Vicki Michelle (Miss Hannigan) and Simon Masterton-Smith (Warbucks). The show proved to be a success, and so for the first two tours and the Malaysian Genting Highlands Production, the role of Annie was then shared by Faye Spittlehouse and a young Lucy May Barker. Miss Hannigan was later performed by Su Pollard and Ruth Madoc and Daddy Warbucks by Mark Wynter. This particular production toured from 2001 to 2007 and resumed in September 2008. The last tour of this production ended in 2011 with the role of Miss Hannigan still being played by Pollard, David McAlister as Warbucks, Victoria Sian Lewis as Annie, and Simone Craddock as Grace Farrell.

=== 2005–2010 US tours ===
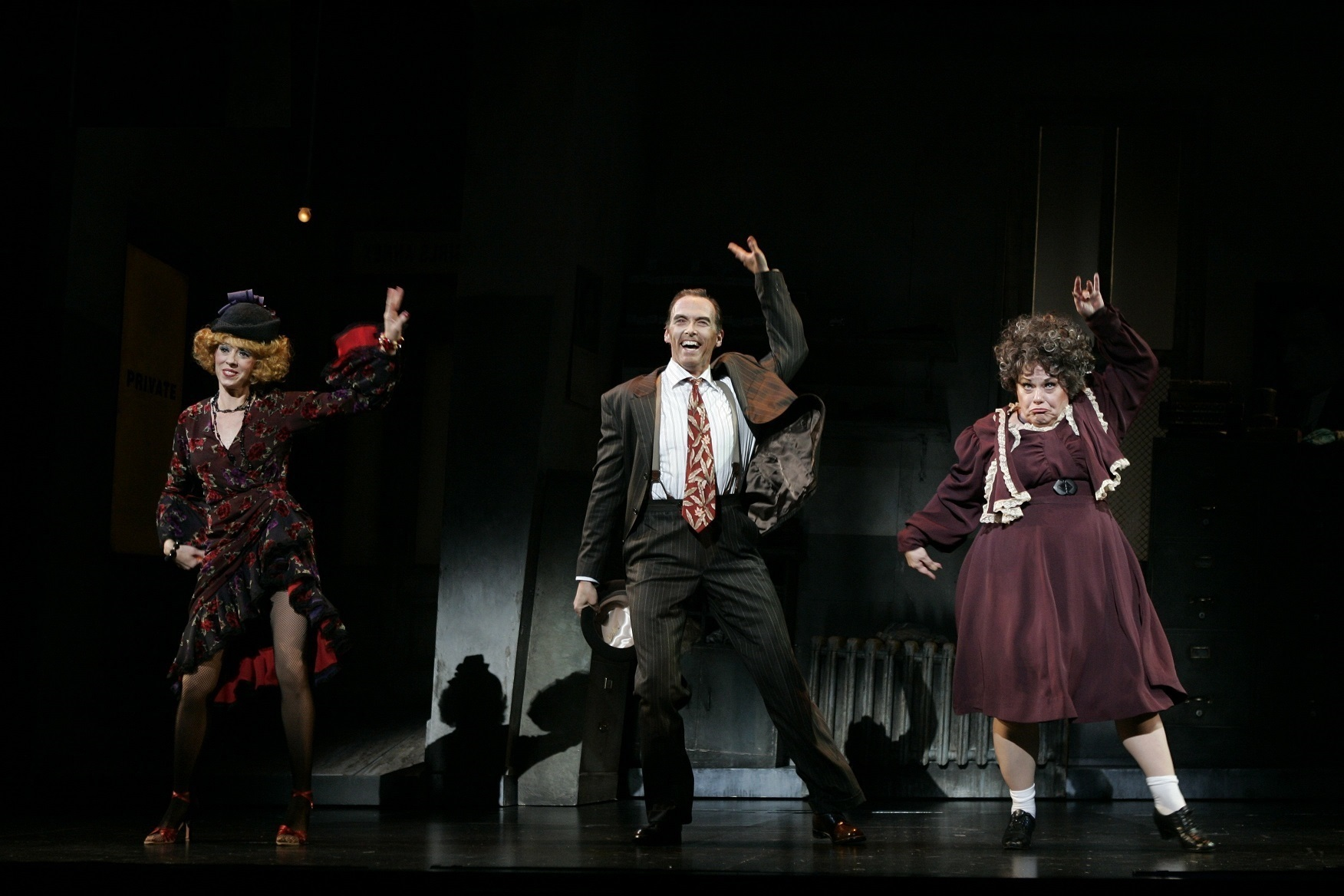
"Easy Street" from the 30th Anniversary National Tour performed by McKenzie Phillips (Lily St. Regis), Scott Willis (Rooster Hannigan) and Alene Robertson (Miss Hannigan)

Opening in August 2005, a 30th anniversary traveling production of Annie by NETworks Tours embarked on a multi-city tour. This production was directed by Martin Charnin and choreographed by Liza Gennaro (daughter of the show's original choreographer, Peter Gennaro). This all-new production with new set designs by Ming Cho Lee, also featured the brand-new song "Why Should I Change A Thing?" (sung by Warbucks). For the first two years of the tour, Conrad John Schuck played Warbucks, reprising the role he played in the original run of Annie on Broadway, as well as the 15th Anniversary National Tour and 1997 Broadway revival. Chicago actress, Alene Robertson was Miss Hannigan, Annie was played by Marissa O'Donnell, Scott Willis played Rooster Hannigan, Elizabeth Broadhurst was Grace Farrell and Mackenzie Phillips performed the role of Lily St. Regis. In December 2006, the tour briefly returned to New York City to play The Theater at Madison Square Garden for Christmas where it broke box office records during the five week stay. Kathie Lee Gifford played Miss Hannigan. This original Equity tour closed on March 25, 2007, at the Hippodrome Theatre in Baltimore, Maryland.

The tour continued non-union for several more years and throughout the run of the show, there were replacements. The 2007-08 tour starred Amanda Balon as Annie, who took over as Molly during the second year. The 2008-09 cast for the tour featured Tianna Stevens as Annie. Early in 2009, Amanda Balon returned temporarily to play the role of Annie until Madison Kerth was rehearsed to play the title role. Also returning were Barton, Andrews and Meisner. Other cast members included Mackenzie Aladjem (Molly). In the 2009-10 tour, Kerth returned as Annie along with most of the previous year's cast, adding Jordan Boezem (from Spotlight Kids in Sarasota, Florida) in the role of July.

=== 2012 Broadway revival ===
A 35th Anniversary production opened on Broadway in 2012. Thomas Meehan revised the musical, with James Lapine directing. Lilla Crawford starred as Annie with Katie Finneran as Miss Hannigan, and Anthony Warlow making his long-awaited Broadway debut as Warbucks. Featured cast included Brynn O'Malley, Clarke Thorell and J. Elaine Marcos as Grace Farrell, Rooster and Lily St. Regis, respectively. The revival started previews at the Palace Theatre on October 3, 2012, and officially opened on November 8, 2012, receiving mixed reviews. Notable replacements include Jane Lynch and Faith Prince as Miss Hannigan. On July 30, Taylor Richardson and Sadie Sink both began alternating the role of Annie, replacing Crawford. This production closed on January 5, 2014, after 38 previews and 487 regular performances.

=== 2014–2025 US tours ===
Starting in September 2014, a 40th anniversary traveling production of Annie was launched by TROIKA Entertainment. Directed by Martin Charnin, the tour kicked off in Detroit, Michigan. For the first year of the tour, Issie Swickle played the title character Annie with Faith Perez as her alternate, alongside Gilgamesh Taggett and Lynn Andrews as Warbucks and Miss Hannigan, respectively. There were many replacements throughout the tour, and by the end of it, Gilgamesh Taggett was the only remaining original member. For most of the second year of the tour, Heidi Gray played Annie. For the third and final year of the tour, Tori Bates played Annie and became the first biracial Annie in a professional production. The 40th Anniversary performance was celebrated in Baltimore, Maryland, on April 21, 2017, with Angelina Carballo as Annie. The tour came to a close in Boston, Massachusetts, on May 21, 2017, after 745 performances.

Another tour directed by Jenn Thompson, who played Pepper in the original Broadway production, began October 4, 2022, and ended June 11, 2023, with Ellie Rose Pulsifer as the title role. A second season of the tour began October 7, 2023, and ended May 19, 2024, with Rainier Trevino playing Annie. Afterwards, the tour moved on to Macau, China, and opened there on August 2, 2024, with the same cast as the 23-24 US tour.

Hazel Vogel played Annie in the third season of this touring production from November 11, 2024 through May 18, 2025. Vogel starred alongside Whoopi Goldberg who joined the cast as Miss Hannigan from December 11, 2024 - January 5, 2025 while at Madison Square Garden.

=== UK and Ireland tours and West End revival (2015–2026) ===
A new UK and Ireland tour opened at the Theatre Royal, Newcastle in July 2015 starring Craig Revel Horwood as Miss Hannigan, directed by Nikolai Foster and produced by Michael Harrison and David Ian, with new orchestrations by George Dyer. The production toured until 2016 with Lesley Joseph appearing at some venues and performances as Miss Hannigan.

The production opened in London's West End at the Piccadilly Theatre, opening on June 5, 2017 (previews beginning on May 23) for a limited run until January 6, 2018. This was Miranda Hart's musical debut as Miss Hannigan (until September 17). The three girls who shared the main role were Madeleine Haynes (reprising her the role from the UK tour), Lola Moxom and Ruby Stokes. From September 19, for a limited 10 week run, Craig Revel Horwood returned to the role of Miss Hannigan, reprising his role from the 2015-16 UK and Ireland tour. The production extended its limited run, with Meera Syal as Miss Hannigan from November 27, through to the show's conclusion on February 18, 2018, when it closed to make way for the musical adaptation of Strictly Ballroom.

The production began another UK and Ireland tour in February 2019 at the Manchester Opera House starring Anita Dobson as Miss Hannigan, alternating venues with Craig Revel Horwood and Jodie Prenger.

Another UK and Ireland tour began at the Curve in Leicester in February 2023 starring Zoe Akinyosade, Harlie Barthram, and Sharangi Gnanavarathan sharing the title role, with Craig Revel Horwood, Paul O'Grady, Jodie Prenger and Elaine C. Smith alternating venues as Miss Hannigan, after previously performing the role in previous tours and West End runs. After performing the role in Newcastle-upon-Tyne and Edinburgh, O'Grady died on March 28, 2023.

A UK and Ireland tour of the production starring La Voix as Miss Hannigan is set to open at the New Wimbledon Theatre in May 2026.

=== 2018 Hollywood Bowl production ===
For its annual fully staged musical event, the Hollywood Bowl produced a limited run of Annie from July 27–29, 2018, directed by Michael Arden. The cast included Kaylin Hedges as the title role, Roger Bart as Rooster, Ana Gasteyer as Miss Hannigan, David Alan Grier as Warbucks, Megan Hilty as Lily St. Regis, Lea Salonga as Grace, Ali Stroker as "Star to Be", and Steven Weber as Franklin D. Roosevelt.

=== Planned 2027 Broadway revival ===
Another Broadway revival directed by Sam Pinkleton is planned to open in the fall of 2027 as part of the musical's 50th anniversary. Michael Alden, Hal Luftig, Cathy Dantchik, and Kevin Connor of Halcyon Theatricals have been announced to serve as producers.

=== International productions ===
Annie has been produced professionally in Canada (1978, Quebec (French adaptation): 2022, 2025), Argentina (1982 (Note: Indicates the production made an official cast recording.)), Australia (1978, 2000, 2011, 2012, 2025), Denmark (1982), Germany (1999), Hungary (1998), Ireland (2003, 2016 (Note: In Ireland, in the 2016 production, the actresses playing Annie and Molly (Aoife McNamara & Simone McInerney) alternated between the roles.)), Israel (2001, 2010, 2018, 2025), Italy (1982, 2006), Japan (1979, 1986–present), (Note: In Japan, a special demo recording of selected songs is made each year, with the new actress playing Annie.) United Kingdom (1978, 1983, 1998, tours from 2000 to 2010), Venezuela (1979) Mexico (1979, 1991, 2010, 2015), Netherlands (1997–1999, 2005–2007, 2012–2013), Norway (1991, 2004, 2013), Philippines (1980, 1984, 1987, 1998, 2016), Portugal (1982, 2010, 2023, 2024), Spain (1982, 2000, 2010, 2019), Sweden (1979 (Stockholm), 1999 (Stockholm), 2005–2006 (Malmö)), Peru (1986, 1997, 2002, 2026), Zimbabwe (2003), Russia (2002–2009), Colombia (2006), South Korea (1984, 1996, 2006–2007, 2010–2011, 2018–2019, 2024), Hong Kong (2012), Belgium (1992, 2008–2009, 2012), Poland (1989), United Arab Emirates (2009), Denmark (2011), Puerto Rico (2012), Singapore (2012), Greece (1981–1982, 2005–2007, 2013–2015, 2019, 2025–2026 (Athens), 2007–2008, 2014–2015 (Thessaloniki)) and Brazil (2018–2019).

== Stage sequels ==
The first attempt at a sequel, Annie 2: Miss Hannigan's Revenge, opened at the John F. Kennedy Center for the Performing Arts in Washington, D.C., in December 1989 to universally disastrous reviews. Extensive reworking of the script and score proved futile, and the project was abandoned.

In 1993, a second attempt, with a different plot and score, titled Annie Warbucks was developed in a workshop at the Goodspeed Opera House (where the original Annie premiered in 1976) under the direction of Michael P. Price. It subsequently opened at the Off Broadway Variety Arts Theatre, where it ran for 200 performances.

== Musical numbers ==
Act I

- Overture – Orchestra
- "Maybe" – Annie and Orphans
- "It's the Hard Knock Life" – Annie and Orphans
- "It's the Hard Knock Life" (Reprise) – Orphans
- "Tomorrow" – Annie
- "We'd Like to Thank You, Herbert Hoover" – Ensemble
- "Little Girls" – Miss Hannigan
- "Little Girls" (Reprise) – Miss Hannigan
- "I Think I'm Gonna Like It Here" – Grace, Annie, Ensemble
- "N.Y.C." – Warbucks, Grace, Annie, Star-to-Be, Ensemble
- "Easy Street" – Rooster, Miss Hannigan and Lily
- "You Won't Be an Orphan for Long" – Grace and Warbucks
- "Maybe" (Reprise) – Annie

Act II

- "Entr'acte – Orchestra
- "Maybe" (Reprise) – Annie
- "You're Never Fully Dressed Without a Smile" – Bert Healy and the Boylan Sisters
- "You're Never Fully Dressed Without a Smile" (Reprise) – Orphans
- "Easy Street" (Reprise) – Rooster, Miss Hannigan and Lily
- "Tomorrow" (Reprise) – Annie, Roosevelt, Warbucks and Cabinet
- "Something Was Missing" – Warbucks
- "Annie" – Grace, Drake and Staff
- "I Don't Need Anything But You" – Warbucks and Annie
- "Maybe" (Reprise) – Annie
- "A New Deal for Christmas" – Warbucks, Grace, Annie, Roosevelt, Orphans and staff
- "Tomorrow" (Bows) – Company

=== Other songs ===
A number titled "You Make Me Happy" and performed by Miss Hannigan and Grace was added as a showcase for Nell Carter in the 1997 Broadway revival. This song hasn't appeared in any subsequent productions.

A number titled "Why Should I Change a Thing?" and performed by Warbucks was added as a showcase for Anthony Warlow in a 2000 Australian production, and has since become an optional part of the show, although it did not appear in the 2012 Broadway revival. In this song, Warbucks reflects on how adopting Annie will change his life after he buys a new locket for her.

== Recordings ==
The original Broadway cast recording was made on April 25, 1977, at the Columbia 30th Street Studio in New York City and released that year by Columbia Records. A CD containing bonus tracks was released on September 15, 1998, by Sony (ASIN: B00000AG6Z). The 1995 London studio cast recording, featuring the National Symphony Orchestra, stars Sarah French as Annie, Kim Criswell as Miss Hannigan and Ron Raines as Warbucks.

A 30th anniversary cast recording was released in 2008 on Time–Life Records. An all-star cast of former Annie cast members includes Carol Burnett, Sally Struthers, Kathie Lee Gifford, Andrea McArdle, John Schuck, Harve Presnell, Gary Beach and Amanda Balon. The rest of the cast is made up of the members of the 30th Anniversary Tour. This recording is a double CD set and includes most of the score as it is performed now on the first disc. The second disc includes songs from the sequel, Annie 2: Miss Hannigan's Revenge, as well as songs that were cut from or added to the original production. There is also a song from the 1977 TV special The Annie Christmas Show. The booklet is made up of original drawings by Philo Barnhart, who is the creator of Ariel and Ursula in The Little Mermaid, and is presented in a comic book style. The album was produced by music producer Robert Sher.

== Novelizations ==
=== Thomas Meehan ===
In 1980, Macmillan Books published Meehan's novelization of his script for the musical, later reprinted by Puffin Books in 2014. Several of the lyrics from songs from the show were adapted into dialogue and monologue for the novelization. The main lyrics of "Tomorrow" are depicted as being Annie's personal mantra, while "Little Girls" becomes a self-pitying monologue by Miss Hannigan alone in her office moments before Annie is returned to her and then taken away by Grace Farrell. On the other hand "You're Never Fully Dressed Without a Smile" is replaced by the slogan "Smile, darn ya, smile" and others such as "It's the Hard Knock Life" are dispensed with entirely. Meehan used the novel to restore material cut from his original storyline and develop the Annie story into his original concept of what he considered to be a 20th-century female American version of Charles Dickens' Oliver Twist.

The novel goes into greater depth regarding the backgrounds of many of the characters, and particularly about hardship at the orphanage, at which brutal beatings and emotional abuse from Miss Hannigan are everyday occurrences. Unlike the high camp portrayal of Miss Hannigan in most productions of the musical, the novelization – in the tradition of Dickens' Oliver Twist – emphatically depicts her as a truly sinister and malevolent villainess – "a skinny hatchet faced woman with short jet-black hair (who) reminded the orphans of a particularly unpleasant looking – and all too real – Halloween witch".

A greater emphasis is placed on the sheer drudgery and illegality of the orphans' sewing labours in the orphanage basement. However, whereas in the musical the orphans are not enrolled in school until the final scene, in the novelization they attend a public school, PS62, where they suffer from snobbery from teachers and harassment from non-orphan pupils, particularly from a spoiled rich girl named Myrtle Vandenmeer. The legal name of Rooster's girlfriend Lily St. Regis is given in the book as being Muriel Jane Gumper.

In the novel, Annie spends several months on the run from the orphanage, initially spending the winter as a resident staff in Bixby's Beanery, a low-grade café run by couple Fred and Gert Bixby, before escaping after she finds Sandy. She then spends several months living in Hooverville with Sophie and the Apple Seller (who is named as G. Randall "Randy" Whitworth Jr, a former stockbroker left destitute by the Depression) who, in the novelization, are adult characters and a couple. It is revealed at the end that Randy, Sophie and all the other Hoovervillites were released from prison and given jobs and homes by Warbucks as gratitude for taking care of Annie. Also reappearing at the end of the book is Sandy, previously written out of the book while fleeing police during the raid on the Hooverville, who it transpires was successfully traced by agents from Pinkerton hired by Warbucks.

=== Leonore Fleischer ===
A second novelization of Annie, by Leonore Fleischer, was published by Random House in 1982. This was a tie-in with the first film and was adapted directly from the screenplay.

== Film and television ==
Columbia Pictures acquired the film rights in 1977 for $9.5 million, the most expensive at the time for a stage musical. The film was released in 1982 directed by John Huston, starring Albert Finney as Warbucks, Carol Burnett as Miss Hannigan, Ann Reinking as Grace Farrell, Tim Curry as Rooster, Bernadette Peters as Lily, and newcomer Aileen Quinn as Annie.

A sequel, Annie: A Royal Adventure! was made for television in 1995. It starred Ashley Johnson, Joan Collins, George Hearn, and Ian McDiarmid. Aside from a reprise of "Tomorrow", there are no songs in it.

A made-for-TV Wonderful World of Disney movie version, produced by The Walt Disney Company and directed by Rob Marshall, was broadcast in 1999; it starred Victor Garber as Daddy Warbucks, Kathy Bates as Miss Hannigan, Audra McDonald as Grace Farrell, Alan Cumming as Rooster, Kristin Chenoweth as Lily, and newcomer Alicia Morton as Annie.

In January 2011, Will Smith announced plans for a remake of Annie set in the present day, produced with his wife Jada Pinkett Smith and rapper Jay-Z for release by Columbia Pictures. This version was to star the Smiths' daughter, Willow, as Annie; but as she had aged out of the part before production began, she was replaced by Quvenzhané Wallis. Directed by Will Gluck and released in 2014, this version of Annie also stars Jamie Foxx as Will Stacks (an update of Warbucks), Rose Byrne as Grace Farrell, and Cameron Diaz as Miss Hannigan.

None of these films contain the songs "We'd Like To Thank You, Herbert Hoover", "You Won't Be an Orphan for Long", "Annie", or "A New Deal for Christmas". The 1982 film additionally omits "N.Y.C." and "Something Was Missing" while adding four new songs. The 2014 film contains the songs common to both films, remixed to various degrees, while adding three new songs.

A documentary film, Life After Tomorrow, was directed and produced by one of the original Broadway and national tour orphans, Julie Stevens and partner, Gil Cates Jr. It reunites more than 40 women who played orphans in the show and reveals the highs and lows of their experiences as child actresses in a cultural phenomenon. The film premiered on Showtime and was released on DVD in 2008.

In May 2021, NBC announced a live television production of Annie with Robert Greenblatt and Neil Meron as executive producers as a "holiday event" in 2021. The production was aired on December 2 of that year. It was directed by Lear deBessonet, and starred Celina Smith as Annie, Taraji P. Henson as Miss Hannigan, Harry Connick Jr. as Oliver Warbucks, Nicole Scherzinger as Grace Farrell, Tituss Burgess as Rooster Hannigan, and Megan Hilty as Lily St. Regis. (Note: Attributed to multiple references:)

== Annie Jr. ==
Annie Jr. is a musical licensed by Music Theatre International's Broadway Junior collection, specially edited to be performed by children in a shortened form. It is performed internationally every year by acting academies, programs, schools, and theatre camps. MTI also licenses another youth version of the show, called Annie KIDS, a 30-minute length version meant for elementary-aged performers.

=== Stage differences (1977 musical) ===
The songs "A New Deal for Christmas", "Something Was Missing" and "Tomorrow (Reprise)" were cut. There is only one version of "You're Never Fully Dressed Without a Smile", which is sung by the orphans. There are only two "Maybe" reprises. The song "You won't Be an Orphan For Long" only features Annie and Daddy Warbucks. The songs "Easy Street", "NYC", and "Little Girls" were also shortened. Many of the songs have been transposed down a few keys to make them easier for amateur child actors to sing. The last verses of "Little Girls" was removed and added again as a reprise later in the same scene.

== Pop culture references ==
Annie's popularity is reflected in its numerous mentions in popular media. References to the show appear in films such as Austin Powers in Goldmember, where Dr. Evil (Mike Myers) and Mini-Me (Verne Troyer) perform Jay-Z's version of the song "Hard Knock Life (Ghetto Anthem)"; and in the 1994 John Waters dark comedy Serial Mom, where Mrs. Jenson (Patsy Grady Abrams) is bludgeoned to death with a leg of mutton by the titular serial killer Beverly Sutphin (Kathleen Turner) while watching the 1982 film version and singing along. It is parodied in Reefer Madness: The Movie Musical, where President Franklin D. Roosevelt (Alan Cumming) shows up as the deus ex machina at the end of the satirical musical to tell the assembled crowd, "A little orphan girl once told me that the sun would come out tomorrow. Her adopted father was a powerful billionaire, so I suppressed the urge to laugh in her face, but now, by gum, I think she may have been on to something!"

References in television series include:

- In an episode of House, Dr. Gregory House (Hugh Laurie) references "Little Orphan Annie" and "Oliver Twist".
- An episode of SCTV, features a spoof commercial of the "original" cast, now older adults still playing their kid roles, performing the 8,000th performance of Annie.
- Stephanie Tanner (Jodie Sweetin) of Full House sings songs from the musical in several episodes.
- On 30 Rock, Liz Lemon (Tina Fey) is discovered in her office after-hours listening to music on her headset and singing "Maybe".
- The stop-motion comedy show Robot Chicken parodied Annie in episodes, including "Maurice Was Caught".
- In "Makeover", an episode of Glee, Sarah Jessica Parker as Isabelle Wright with Kurt Hummel (Chris Colfer) and Rachel Berry (Lea Michele) sing "You're Never Fully Dressed Without A Smile".
- In the Netflix series Haters Back Off, Miranda Sings (Colleen Ballinger) and her family attempt to mount a backyard production of Annie (with extensive book and score revisions) in the episode "Staring in a Musicall".
- In the animated show Hazbin Hotel, the character Alastor (Amir Talai) references Annie by telling another character, "Smile, my dear. You know, you're never fully dressed without one!" Furthermore, "You're Never Fully Dressed Without A Smile" and the character Bert Healy were the inspirations for Alastor's character and singing voice. Talai also performed as the character in the 2018 Hollywood Bowl production.
- In the episode of The Big Bang Theory, "The Maternal Combustion", Howard Wolowitz (Simon Helberg), Raj Koothrappali (Kunal Nayyar) and Stuart Bloom (Kevin Sussman) sing "It's a Hard Knock Life" while cleaning the kitchen.
- In the September 27, 2012 episode of The X Factor, twelve year-old singing contestant Jordyn Foley performed "Tomorrow."

The song "Tomorrow" is sung in many media pieces, including in Roseanne, by Darlene Conner (Sara Gilbert) and Becky Conner (Lecy Goranson); by Chandler Bing (Matthew Perry) in Friends, by Elizabeth Masterson (Reese Witherspoon) in Just Like Heaven; by Donkey (Eddie Murphy) in the CGI movies Shrek II and Shrek Forever After; and in a commercial for Lowe's Hardware promoting their next-day delivery. The climax of the animated film Igor involved a giant monster named Eva (Molly Shannon) performing "Tomorrow".

Other prominent media references include the following:

- Producer The 45 King heavily sampled "It's the Hard-Knock Life" from the original Broadway cast recording on rapper Jay-Z's single "Hard Knock Life (Ghetto Anthem)" (1998).
- The Family Guy episode “Peter Peter Caviar Eater” includes a parody of “I Think I’m Going To Like It Here” called “This House is Freakin’ Sweet!”.
- The NFL Network produced two Super Bowl ads in 2004 and 2005 featuring "Tomorrow". A series of football celebrities who were retired or did not make it to that year's Super Bowl would sing the song, ending with the caption "Tomorrow, we're all undefeated again."
- Comedian Zach Galifianakis lip-synced to a recording of "Tomorrow" during his monologue on the March 12, 2011, episode of Saturday Night Live while dressed as Annie.
- In The Lego Ninjago Movie, a scene of the character Lloyd Garmadon (Dave Franco) returning to his home while reflecting on his life plays "It's the Hard-Knock Life".
- In season 3, episode 4 ("Gently Falling Rain") of The Orville, the Krill attended a performance of Annie during peace negotiations on Earth and a young alien girl sings "Tomorrow".
- In the song A Musical, from Something Rotten, the characters sing “It’s a musical for us” to the tune of It’s a Hard Knock Life, due to Nostradamus predicting that musicals will be the next big thing in renaissance theatre.

== Awards and nominations ==
=== Original Broadway production ===
Year	Award	Category	Nominee	Result
1977	Tony Award	Best Musical		Won
1977	Tony Award	Best Book of a Musical	Thomas Meehan	Won
1977	Tony Award	Best Original Score	Charles Strouse and Martin Charnin	Won
1977	Tony Award	Best Performance by a Leading Actor in a Musical	Reid Shelton	Nominated
1977	Tony Award	Best Performance by a Leading Actress in a Musical	Andrea McArdle	Nominated
1977	Tony Award	Best Performance by a Leading Actress in a Musical	Dorothy Loudon	Won
1977	Tony Award	Best Direction of a Musical	Martin Charnin	Nominated
1977	Tony Award	Best Choreography	Peter Gennaro	Won
1977	Tony Award	Best Scenic Design	David Mitchell	Won
1977	Tony Award	Best Costume Design	Theoni V. Aldredge	Won
1977	Drama Desk Award	Outstanding Musical		Won
1977	Drama Desk Award	Outstanding Book of a Musical	Thomas Meehan	Won
1977	Drama Desk Award	Outstanding Actor in a Musical	Reid Shelton	Nominated
1977	Drama Desk Award	Outstanding Featured Actress in a Musical	Dorothy Loudon	Won
1977	Drama Desk Award	Outstanding Director of a Musical	Martin Charnin	Won
1977	Drama Desk Award	Outstanding Choreography	Peter Gennaro	Won
1977	Drama Desk Award	Outstanding Music	Charles Strouse	Nominated
1977	Drama Desk Award	Outstanding Lyrics	Martin Charnin	Won
1977	Drama Desk Award	Outstanding Costume Design	Theoni V. Aldredge	Won
1977	New York Drama Critics' Circle Award	Best Musical		Won
1978	Grammy Award	Best Cast Show Album		Won

=== 1997 Broadway revival ===
Year	Award	Category	Nominee	Result
1997	Tony Award	Best Revival of a Musical		Nominated

=== 1998 London revival ===
Year	Award	Category	Nominee	Result
1999	Laurence Olivier Award	Best Performance in a Supporting Role in a Musical	Andrew Kennedy	Nominated
1999	Laurence Olivier Award	Best Theatre Choreographer	Peter Gennaro	Nominated

=== 2013 Broadway revival ===
Year	Award	Category	Nominee	Result
2013	Tony Award	Best Revival of a Musical		Nominated
2013	Drama Desk Award	Outstanding Actor in a Musical	Anthony Warlow	Nominated
