= Is There Life After High School? =

- Original Broadway Cast recording cover
- Music: Craig Carnelia
- Lyrics: Craig Carnelia
- Book: Jeffrey Kindley
- Basis: Is There Life After High School? by Ralph Keyes
- Premiere: May 7, 1982: Ethel Barrymore Theatre, New York City
- Productions: 1982 Broadway; 1986 West End

Is There Life After High School? is a musical with a book by Jeffrey Kindley and music and lyrics by Craig Carnelia. It is loosely inspired by Ralph Keyes' best-selling book of the same name.

The show uses songs and monologues to recall the joys, terrors, envies, hates, and loves that most teenagers experience throughout their four years of high school.

The world premiere was mounted by the Hartford Stage Company in Hartford, Connecticut. The Broadway production was staged by Robert Nigro and choreographed by Larry Fuller. It had a long preview period of 48 performances before opening on May 7, 1982, at the Ethel Barrymore Theatre. It closed after 17 performances. The cast included Sandy Faison, Harry Groener, David Patrick Kelly, Alma Cuervo, and James Widdoes, who won the Theatre World Award for his performance. Scott Bakula was one of the understudies.

An original cast album was released on the Original Cast label, and was re-issued on CD by the same company in 1995, with bonus tracks sung by the composer/lyricist.

Producer and director Robert Neal Marshall produced the critically acclaimed London West End debut at the Donmar Warehouse in the Summer of 1986 as a special limited engagement. This production starred Caroline O'Connor, Mark Michael Hutchinson, Geoff Steer, Rosemarie Ford, Lynne Kieran, Steven Mann, Nelly Morrison & Nigel Garton early in their careers who did this late night engagement while several were also appearing in West End hit shows Me and My Girl, 42nd Street and The Hired Man. The musical director was Tony Castro.

The show has been staged at Ford's Theatre in Washington, D.C., and at regional theatres throughout the country. The Birmingham Repertory theatre staged a youth theatre production in 2009 at the Old REP in the UK.

The song "The Kid Inside" was covered by Barry Manilow on his 1991 musical album Showstoppers and John Barrowman on his 2010 self-titled studio album.

== Song list ==
Act I

- The Kid Inside
- Things I Learned in High School
- Second Thoughts
- Nothing Really Happened
- Beer
- For Them
- Diary of a Homecoming Queen

Act II

- Thousands of Trumpets (featuring the Trumbull High School CT marching band)
- Reunion
- High School All Over Again
- Fran and Janie
- I'm Glad You Didn't Know Me
