= JFK: A Musical Drama =

Musical

The Theatrical Poster

JFK: A Musical Drama is a musical with music by Will Holt, and book and lyrics by Will Holt and Tom Sawyer. Based loosely on the life of John F. Kennedy. It premiered at the Olympia Theatre, Dublin on April 24, 1997 and New York City in 1998.

The production was directed and choreographed by Larry Fuller and produced by Stewart F. Lane. The role of JFK was played by Maurice Clarke. It also starred Gary Raymond, Brian DeSalvo, Monica Ernesti, Stella McCusker and Peter Vollebreght.

The musical was music directed by Aaron Hagan and orchestrated by Peter Matz. A cast album with some of the original 1993 Goodspeed Opera House at Chester cast including Rita Gardner, Michael Brian, Claudia Rose Golde, and William Zeffiro was recorded in 2007.

Upon the early closure of the musical, Frank Kilfeather of the Irish Times quipped "Can you remember where you where, the night they said "JFK" had been shut?".

== Development ==
The musical was workshopped in 1994 at Norma Terris Theatre in Chester, Connecticut.

The show's world premiere was at the University of Oklahoma in 1995 under the name "Jack, A Musical Drama". In 1997 the show ran at the Olympia Theatre in Dublin from April 22 until May 3. The show had been scheduled to run until June 15, but closed early due to poor reviews and audience reception.

In May 1998 the show was produced in New York in concert format as a way to seek financial backers for a full musical production.

In 2013 the show was produced in concert format, under the name "Jack: A Musical Drama on the Life of John F. Kennedy".

== Plot ==
The show begins while John is still a student at Harvard. He has a rough relationship with his father, Joseph P. Kennedy Sr., who belittles him and compares him unfavorably to his brother, Joe Jr. After Joe Jr. dies during World War II, his father demands that John enter the world of politics in his brother's place.

== Cast ==
	1995 University of Oklahoma	1997 Dublin	1998 Broadway	2013 Concert Production
John F. Kennedy		Maurice Clarke		Patrick Cummings
Jackie Kennedy		Monica Ernesti		Jessica Grové
Joseph Kennedy	John Cullum	Gary Raymond		
Rosemary Kennedy		Stella McCusker		
Robert Kennedy		Michael Londra		
Honey FItz		Brian De Salvo		

== See also ==
- Cultural depictions of John F. Kennedy
