= Larry Fuller (choreographer) =

American actor, dancer, and choreographer

Larry Fuller is an American choreographer, theatre director, dancer, and actor. Both a Tony Award and Drama Desk Award nominated choreographer, he is best known for his work on Broadway where he notably staged the movement for the original productions of On the Twentieth Century (1978), Sweeney Todd: The Demon Barber of Fleet Street (1979), Evita (1979), Merrily We Roll Along (1981), Is There Life After High School? (1982), and A Doll's Life (1982).

== Life and career ==
Born in Sullivan, Missouri, Fuller began his career as an actor portraying Enoch Snow in the 1957 revival of Rodgers and Hammerstein's Carousel at New York City Center with Pat Stanley as Carrie Pepperidge and Barbara Cook as Julie Jordan. He went on to appear in the original Broadway productions of West Side Story (as a Jet swing), The Music Man, Redhead, Kean, Bravo Giovanni, Donnybrook!, No Strings, and Funny Girl with Barbra Streisand. He would go on to recreate the original Carol Haney choreography for the American touring and London West End productions of Funny Girl. Additional touring productions Fuller has directed and choreographed include The Music Man, I Do! I Do!, Kismet and On a Clear Day You Can See Forever.

Fuller's credits as a choreographer include the original Broadway productions of That's Entertainment (1972), On the Twentieth Century (1978), Sweeney Todd: The Demon Barber of Fleet Street (1979), Evita (1979), Merrily We Roll Along (1981), Is There Life After High School? (1982), and A Doll's Life (1982). He has been nominated for the Drama Desk Award for Outstanding Choreography twice, for his work in Sweeney Todd and Evita; the latter of which also garnered him a nomination for the Tony Award for Best Choreography.

In Europe, Fuller has directed and choreographed productions of West Side Story in Vienna and Nuremberg, created Jazz and the Dancing Americans for the Opera House Ballet in Graz, Austria and the Theatre an der Wien in Vienna, and directed the European premieres of Leonard Bernstein's Candide and On the Town, and George Gershwin's Girl Crazy. He also directed and choreographed in London's West End the mid-1980s hit multi-media musical Time and Marilyn! the Musical. He also directed the 1992 European tour of Jesus Christ Superstar, and in 1997 he directed and choreographed JFK: A Musical Drama in Dublin, Ireland.

Television audiences have seen Fuller's choreography on The Ed Sullivan Show. He also choreographed the 39th Tony Awards (1985), and both staged and choreographed he 40th Tony Awards (1986). He also choreographed the 37th Primetime Emmy Awards (1985) and the 38th Primetime Emmy Awards (1986).

Fuller had a romantic relationship with fellow choreographer/director Michael Bennett for many years. The 1996 documentary On Your Toes . . . The Making Of - Director/Choreographer Larry Fuller (1996) documents the making of the musical production On Your Toes with the Stuttgart Ballet in 1990.
