= Charles West (author) =

British novelist and actor

- Born: 27 August 1927; Nottingham, England
- Died: 7 January 2022 (aged 94); Oxfordshire, Oxfordshire, England
- Education: Royal Academy of Dramatic Art
- Occupation: Novelist
- Writing career
- Genre: Crime

Charles Leonard West (27 Aug 1927–7 January 2022) was a British crime novelist and actor from Nottingham. He studied acting at RADA and singing at Dartington Hall Music School. He was a member of the Old Vic Theatre Company 1958–1962 and subsequently performed in nine West End musicals in London, including Daddy Warbucks in Annie at Victoria Palace beginning in the 1970s and Don Quixote in Man of La Mancha at the Martin Beck Theater on Broadway. He wrote his first novel, Destruction Man, while acting in Australia. His Australian detective Paul Crook features in "Stonefish", "Stage Fright", "Little Ripper", and "The Long Hook". First married to Tona deBrett in 1954 and had three children, Jonathon, Stephen and Timothy. Later married to actress Julia West (a National Theatre company member who appeared in the film "Atonement").

== Bibliography ==
- Destruction Man (1976)
- Funnelweb (1989)
- Little Ripper (1991)
- Stonefish (1991)
- Stage Fright (1993)
- Little Devil (2006)
- The Long Hook (2008)
