= The People, Yes =

Book by Carl Sandburg

- First edition
- Author: Carl Sandburg
- Language: English
- Genre: Poetry
- Publisher: Harcourt, Brace & Company (US)
- Publication date: 1936
- Media type: Print
- ISBN: 0156716658

The People, Yes is a book-length poem written by Carl Sandburg and published in 1936. The 300 page work is thoroughly interspersed with references to American culture, phrases, and stories (such as the legend of Paul Bunyan). Published at the height of the Great Depression, the work lauds the perseverance of the American people in notably plain-spoken language. It was written over an eight-year period. It is Sandburg’s last major book of poetry.

== See also ==
- "Suppose They Gave a War and No One Came" (1966)
