= Rosalie Maggio =

Feminist author

Rosalie Ann Maggio (November 8, 1943 – September 18, 2021) was the author of 24 books and hundreds of articles, known for her work in bias-free language, letter-writing, women's quotation books, children's stories, and resurrecting the name and achievements of Marie Marvingt.

== Education ==
Maggio majored in French at St. Catherine University and attended the Université de Nancy in France, where she received two "certificats" in Humanities.

== Family ==
Rosalie Maggio was born in Victoria, Texas, to Irene Cecilia Nash Maggio and Paul Joseph Maggio, D.D.S. She moved to Fort Dodge Iowa in 1945 and grew up as the oldest of eight siblings. In 2010 she was co-author of “Pieces of Eight: Still Best Friends After All These Years” recounting their stories.

In 1969 she married David C. Koskenmaki, a research scientist and holder of numerous patents, and raised three children while living in Saint Paul, Minnesota.

== Career ==
Maggio authored "How to Say It", a three-million-copy bestseller about letter writing which reached global audiences, with translations in Japanese, Chinese, Thai, Korean, and Arabic.

She spent 40 years researching the forgotten French athlete, aviator, journalist, and mountaineer Marie Marvingt, then authored two books, several children's stories, and multiple articles about this prize-winning woman, helping to establish her name in history. Her most recent book "Marie Marvingt, Fiancee of Danger: First Female Bomber Pilot, World-Class Athlete and Inventor of the Air Ambulance," was published by McFarland & Company in 2019.

She was mostly known for her work in bias-free language. Her last publication, "Unpinning the Spin," published by the Women's Media Center, now has an easy online reference guide. The Nonsexist Word Finder: A Dictionary of Gender-Free Usage was her first book on the subject, published by The Oryx Press in 1987. At the time, the book stirred controversy in the media. It was discussed in notable publications, including The New York Times, The Washington Post, The Boston Globe, and The San Francisco Chronicle. She was a frequent guest on talk show radio discussing her books and non-sexist language, including NPR.

Maggio was also an author of children's stories, many featured in Highlights and Cricket magazines. In 1987, she received the "Author of the Month" award from Highlights for Children, and was the winner of the "Highlights for Children" Fiction Contest in 1990. She published two children's books, and "The Music Box Christmas" by Morrow Junior Books in 1990 was named to the International Reading Association's Young Adults' Choices for 1992.

She compiled an extensive collection of quotations by women, reading over 60,000 books in pursuit of the best quotes. The Beacon Book of Quotations by Women was first published in 1992, and The New Beacon Book of Quotations by Women was published in 1996.

Rosalie Maggio continued to write until her death on September 18, 2021, in La Crescenta, California.

== Achievements ==
Rosalie Maggio's career was marked by awards, honors, and grants that recognized her contributions to literature and social justice. Some of her notable achievements include:

- Veteran Feminists of America Honor Roll: Recognized for her significant contribution to the Second Wave feminist revolution (2002).
- Mary Kennedy Lamb Award: Received from the Commission on Women and the Inclusive Language Committee of the Archdiocese of Saint Paul and Minneapolis for contributions to inclusivity and social justice (1999).
- Outstanding Book on Human Rights: "The Bias-Free Word Finder" was selected by The Gustavus Myers Center for the Study of Human Rights in the United States (1993).
- Minnesota Women's Press "Newsmaker": Named one of twenty women "changemakers" in 1992 (Minnesota Women's Press).
- Midwest Book Achievement: Awarded in 1993 for "The Beacon Book of Quotations by Women" (Best Hardcover Book).
- Chicago Women in Publishing 1993 Awards: Received second place for best reference book for "The Beacon Book of Quotations by Women."
- Minnesota Book Awards: Winner in the informational category for "How to Say It" (1991) and "Beacon Book of Quotations by Women" (1993).
- Jerome, Dayton Hudson, General Mills Foundation Literature Travel Grant Award (1990).
- Certificate of Recognition: Awarded by the Children's Reading Round Table of Chicago for distinguished accomplishment in children's literature (1991).
- Magazine Merit Award: Presented by the Society of Children's Book Writers for outstanding magazine work in nonfiction (1988).
- Abigail Award: Received from the Abigail Quigley McCarthy Center for Women's Research, Resources, and Scholarship at the College of St. Catherine for advancing research and scholarship on women and women's issues (1988).
- Who's Who in U.S. Writers, Editors & Poets: Listed in multiple editions.
