= Christian Appy =

American historian (born 1955)

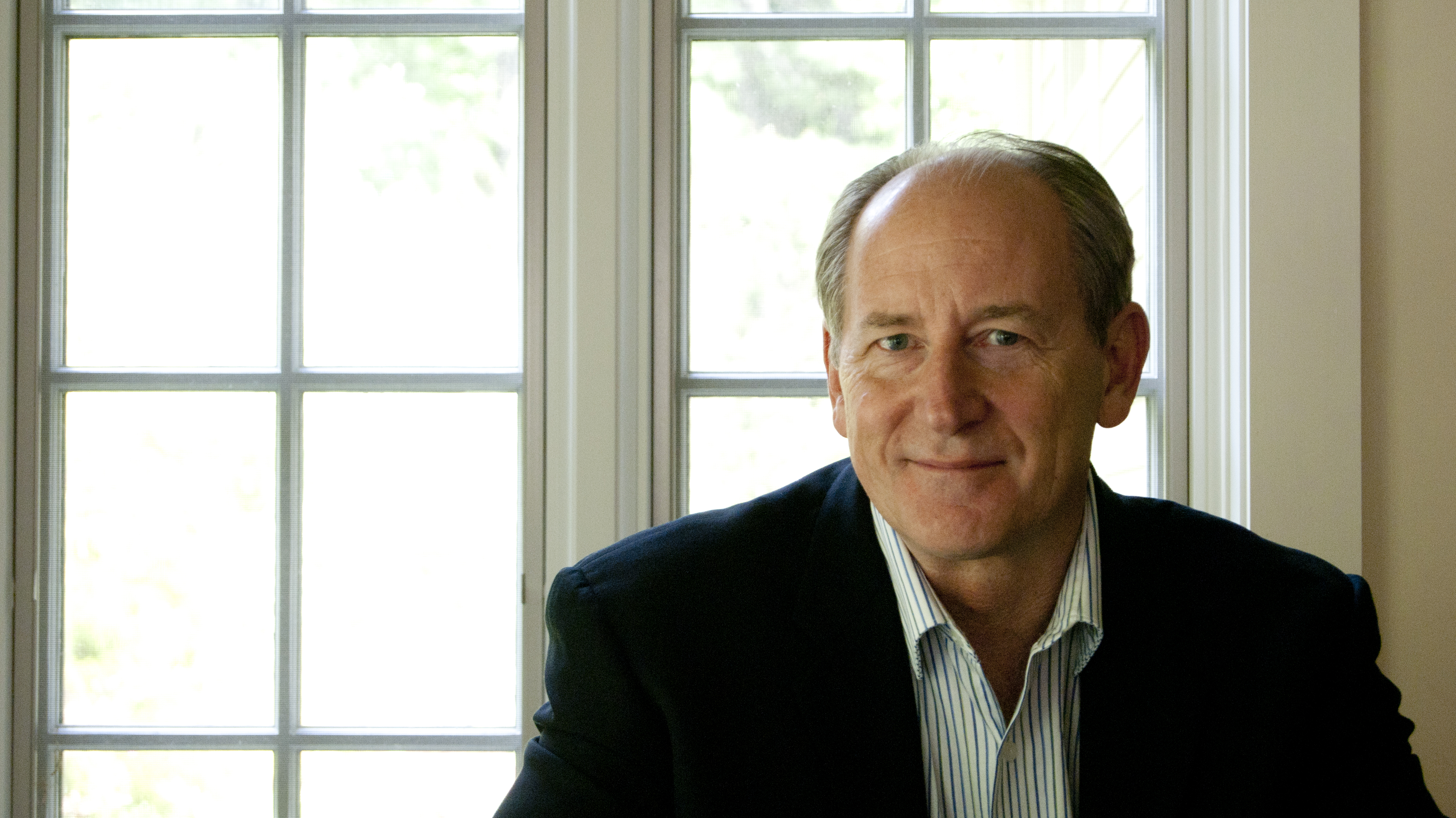
- Born: 5 April 1955 (age 71); Atlanta, Georgia
- Occupation: Professor author
- Writing career
- Subject: Vietnam War
- Notable works: Patriots: The Vietnam War Remembered From All Sides American Reckoning: The Vietnam War and Our National Identity

Christian Gerard Appy (born 5 April 1955) is a professor of history at the University of Massachusetts Amherst. He is widely known as a leading expert on the Vietnam War experience. The most recent of his three books on the subject is American Reckoning: The Vietnam War and Our National Identity. It explores the war's impact on American politics, culture, and foreign policy from the 1950s to the Obama presidency.

== Biography ==
Appy was born in Atlanta, Georgia in 1955. In 1964, his family moved to Westport, Connecticut, where he attended public school and graduated from Staples High School in 1973. At Amherst College, class of 1977, he majored in American Studies and wrote a prize-winning honors thesis on Appalachian coal miners. He received his Ph.D. in the history of American civilization at Harvard University in 1987. His dissertation received the Ralph Henry Gabriel dissertation prize from the American Studies Association. It went on to become his first book, Working Class War: American Combat Soldiers and Vietnam. Appy taught at Harvard and MIT before accepting a position in the history department at the University of Massachusetts Amherst in 2004. His book Patriots: The Vietnam War Remembered from All Sides is widely assigned to college students studying the Vietnam War, due to its unique and nearly comprehensive view of those involved in the war. The book includes 135 oral histories drawn from 350 interviews conducted by Appy over the course of researching the book. Patriots won the 2004 Massachusetts Book Award for nonfiction.

Appy is now working on a book about Daniel Ellsberg, the whistleblower who, in 1971, released to the press a 7000-page secret history of the Vietnam War—the Pentagon Papers—that exposed decades of official lies about the causes and conduct of the war. Appy’s work on Ellsberg was inspired by the 2019 acquisition of Ellsberg’s papers by the University of Massachusetts—a collection of 500 boxes of materials. In 2020–21, Appy helped organize a series of events to mark the 50th anniversary of the Pentagon Papers’ release—a year-long seminar, the creation of a website (the Ellsberg Archive Project), a series of podcasts by The GroundTruth Project, and a two-day online conference with more than two-dozen high-profile scholars, journalists, former policymakers, whistleblowers, and activists. In 2022, Appy became the director of the Ellsberg Initiative for Peace and Democracy at UMass.

At the University of Massachusetts, Appy has received the Distinguished Teaching Award, the Distinguished Graduate Mentor Award, and the Chancellor's Medal.

== Works ==
- Cold War Constructions: The Political Culture of United States Imperialism, 1945-1966. University of Massachusetts Press. 2000. ISBN 978-1-5584-9218-9.
- Working-Class War: American Combat Soldiers and Vietnam. University of North Carolina Press. 2000. ISBN 978-0-8078-6011-3.
- Patriots: The Vietnam War Remembered from All Sides. Penguin Publishing Group. 2004. ISBN 978-1-4406-2654-8.
- Vietnam: The Definitive Oral History Told from All Sides, Ebury, 2006, ISBN 9780091910112
- American Reckoning: The Vietnam War and Our National Identity. Penguin Publishing Group. 2015. ISBN 978-0-698-19155-6.
