= Ralph Keyes (author) =

American author (born 1945)

Ralph Keyes (born 1945) is an American author. His 16 books include Is There Life After High School?, The Courage to Write, and The Post-Truth Era. That 2004 book illustrated Keyes's anticipation of social trends in his writing.

Keyes's books have dealt with topics in popular culture such as risk-taking, time pressure, loneliness, honesty, and human height. More recently, he has turned to language: researching quotations, words, and expressions. Nice Guys Finish Seventh and The Quote Verifier explore the actual sources of familiar quotations. I Love It When You Talk Retro is about common words and phrases based on past events. His most recent book is Euphemania: Our Love Affair with Euphemisms. (The British edition is titled Unmentionables: From Family Jewels to Friendly Fire, What We Say Instead of What We Mean.)

Keyes has also written numerous articles for publications ranging from GQ to Good Housekeeping. In 2002, an article he co-authored won the McKinsey Award for Best Article of the Year in The Harvard Business Review.

Keyes is a frequent guest on NPR shows such as All Things Considered, Talk of the Nation, and On the Media, and has appeared on The Tonight Show, 20/20, and The Oprah Winfrey Show on television. He also speaks to professional, corporate and educational groups.

After graduating from Antioch College in 1967, Keyes did graduate work at the London School of Economics and Political Science. From 1968 to 1970, he worked as an assistant to Bill Moyers, then the publisher of Long Island's Newsday. For the following decade, he was a Fellow of the Center for Studies of the Person in La Jolla, California, and then freelanced writing and speaking in Philadelphia.

== Reviews ==
Contemporary Authors introduced their biography of Keyes by writing, “In his books, Ralph Keyes explores obstacles ranging from learning how to deal with loneliness in an increasingly dehumanized and mobile society to the obvious and subtle difficulties associated with being unusually tall or short. Relying on statistical information, questionnaire results, and comments obtained during personal interviews, Keyes blends a touch of humor and occasional sadness with his factual findings to develop highly readable and entertaining studies of the insecurities troubling countless American adults.”

Sociologist James Samuel Coleman, author of the seminal Coleman Report on school integration, called Is There Life After High School? “the first book I have ever seen that transmits the intensity, that recaptures the pain, the embarrassment, the struggle for status that high school is all about.” Since this book was published, “life after high school” has become a cultural catchphrase. (In Rock 'n' Roll High School, a character shouts, "There is life after high school!") The labels Keyes applied to more and less popular students – “innies and outies” – have also become commonplace.

The psychological flavor of Keyes's writing is especially evident in The Courage to Write and its sequel, The Writer’s Book of Hope, which emphasise confronting the anxiety that inhibits writers. An interview with Keyes on the website Writer Unboxed was introduced with the observation that, when asked about their favorite books on the craft of writing, other authors they talked to “Almost without exception, author Ralph Keyes’ books top their list.”

In The Courage to Write, Keyes wrote, "I'm often asked why I write so often about ‘negative’ subjects: tensions between fathers and sons, adolescent angst, time pressure. My answer is that exploring such topics on paper helps me get rid of them. Writing can be wonderful therapy, and cheap at the price. At the very least, you eventually get bored by thinking about anxious topics and want to move on".

In a Publishers Weekly essay on "Why I Write", Keyes wrote, "Writing gives me license to look into things I’d like to look into anyway, such as quotations, language use and word origins".

Editors of quotation books such as The Yale Book of Quotations (Fred Shapiro), Random House Webster’s Quotationary (Leonard Roy Frank), The New Beacon Book of Quotations by Women (Rosalie Maggio), and Winston Churchill by Himself (Richard Langworth) have credited Keyes's books on the origins of quotations with helping them research their own. When his book “Nice Guys Finish Seventh” was published in 1992, Fred Shapiro, editor of The Yale Book of Quotations, judged it to have "the best research of any quotation book ever published".

In an early Contemporary Authors entry about him, Keyes said that he enjoyed researching his books as much as writing them. As for his prose style, he added, "The longer I write, the simpler I'd like my writing to be: a well-cleaned piece of glass through which the reader can see clearly to the content inside. The ideal would be prose so transparent that readers wouldn't even be aware of my fingers at the keyboard. The hardest work of writing, I find, is concealing how much effort it takes, and beating down the urge to show off".

== Personal life ==
Ralph Keyes lives in Portland, Oregon, with Muriel Keyes, his wife of more than half a century, who is a retired health care advocate and college administrator. Their sons live in Portland with their wives and children. Keyes is the brother of peace activist and cartographer Gene Keyes.

As a hobby, Keyes collects toasters.

== Books ==
- We, the Lonely People: Searching for Community. New York: Harper & Row, 1973. ISBN 978-0-060-64552-6
- Is There Life After High School? New York: Little, Brown, 1976; New York: Warner Books, 1976. ISBN 978-0-446-89394-7
- The Height of Your Life. New York: Little, Brown, 1980. ISBN 978-0-316-49131-0
- Chancing It: Why We Take Risks. New York: Little, Brown, 1985) ISBN 978-0-316-49132-7
- Timelock: How Life Got So Hectic and What You Can Do About It. New York: HarperCollins, 1991. ISBN 978-0-060-16576-5
- Sons on Fathers: A Book of Men’s Writing. New York: HarperCollins, 1992. ISBN 978-0-060-16867-4
- "Nice Guys Finish Seventh": False Phrases, Spurious Sayings, and Familiar Misquotations. New York: HarperCollins, 1992. ISBN 978-0-06-270020-9
- The Courage to Write: How Writers Transcend Fear. New York: Henry Holt, 1995. ISBN 978-0-805-03188-1
- The Wit & Wisdom of Harry Truman. New York: HarperCollins, 1995. ISBN 978-0-060-17207-7
- The Wit & Wisdom of Oscar Wilde. New York: HarperCollins, 1996. ISBN 978-0-060-17367-8
- With Richard Farson. Whoever Makes the Most Mistakes Wins: The Paradox of Innovation. New York: Free Press, 2002. ISBN 978-0-7432-2592-2
- The Writer’s Book of Hope: Getting from Frustration to Publication. New York: Henry Holt, 2003. ISBN 978-0-805-07235-8
- The Post-Truth Era: Dishonesty and Deception in Contemporary Life. New York: St. Martin's Press, 2004. ISBN 978-0-312-30648-9
- The Quote Verifier: Who Said What, Where, and When. New York: St. Martin's Press, 2006. ISBN 978-0-312-34004-9
- I Love It When You Talk Retro: Hoochie Coochie, Double Whammy, Drop a Dime, and the Forgotten Origins of American Speech. New York: St. Martin's Press, 2009. ISBN 978-0-312-34005-6
- Euphemania: Our Love Affair with Euphemisms. New York: Little, Brown, 2010. ISBN 978-0-316-05656-4
- Second Thoughts: The Power of Positive Regret. Amazon Kindle, 2014.
