= Suppose They Gave a War and Nobody Came =

1970 film by Hy Averback

- 1970 theatrical poster
- Directed by: Hy Averback
- Written by: Hal Captain; Don McGuire
- Produced by: Fred Engel
- Starring: Brian Keith; Ernest Borgnine; Suzanne Pleshette; Tony Curtis
- Cinematography: Burnett Guffey
- Edited by: John F. Burnett
- Music by: Jerry Fielding
- Production company: ABC Pictures International
- Distributed by: Cinerama Releasing Corporation
- Release date: May 20, 1970
- Running time: 113 minutes
- Country: United States
- Language: English
- Budget: $3,600,000
- Box office: $1,080,000

Suppose They Gave a War and Nobody Came (also known as War Games, Old Soldiers Never) is a 1970 American drama-comedy film directed by Hy Averback, produced by Fred Engel, and starring Brian Keith, Don Ameche, Tony Curtis, Ernest Borgnine, Suzanne Pleshette, Ivan Dixon, and Pamela Britton. The plot is a mixture of comic and dramatic elements and concerns the reactions of a number of World War II veterans to the contemporary US Army.

The title is derived from an American antiwar slogan from the hippie subculture during the Vietnam War era, popularized by Charlotte E. Keyes in her 1966 article for McCall's magazine titled "Suppose They Gave a War and No One Came".

== Plot ==
Col. Flanders commands a U.S. Army base in the South. To improve relations with the locals, he decides to throw a community dance. He gives the assignment to Warrant Officer Michael M. Nace, sergeants Shannon Gambroni and Jones, and a captain, Myerson.

A bigot named Billy Joe Davis is a big man in town, backed by Harve, a redneck sheriff. Harve considers a pretty barfly, Ramona, to be his girl, so when he catches Gambroni and her together, he has the sergeant placed under arrest for lewd conduct in public.

Nace is drunk and of no help. Jones, who is black, is refused a loan by Mr. Kruft, a banker in town, so in anger he decides to spring Gambroni from jail. Billy Joe retaliates by calling in his armed militia, so Nace steals a tank from the base and fights back. Harve takes three of the soldiers as his prisoners.

Nace and Jones (in the tank) manage to arrive at the town, where they wreak havoc by running over the stone statue of a Confederate war hero and ram-crash into the local jail, enabling Gambroni to break out.

By the time the dust settles, Col. Flanders and his men have arrived in town to save the day. The town mayor fires the sheriff for abuse of authority and the military men pledge to repair the damage caused by the tank.

== Cast ==
- Brian Keith as W.O. Nace
- Tony Curtis as Staff Sergeant Gambroni
- Ernest Borgnine as Sheriff Harve
- Ivan Dixon as Sergeant First Class Jones
- Suzanne Pleshette as Ramona
- Tom Ewell as Billy Joe
- Bradford Dillman as Captain Myerson
- Arthur O'Connell as Kruft
- Maxine Stuart as Zelda
- Pamela Britton as Sergeant Graham
- Don Ameche as Colonel Flanders
- John Donald Fiedler as Major Purvess
- Robert Emhardt as Lester Calhoun
- Christopher Mitchum as Alturi
- Grady Sutton as Reverend Dinwood

== Reception ==
The film earned rentals of $630,000 in North America and $450,000 in other countries, recording an overall loss of $4,160,000.

While produced and wholly owned by ABC, the network did not air the movie on prime time television until 1979, where it was retitled War Games.

== See also ==
- List of American films of 1970
- Tank (film) (1984)
- Harry's War (1981 film)
