= Reid Shelton =

American actor

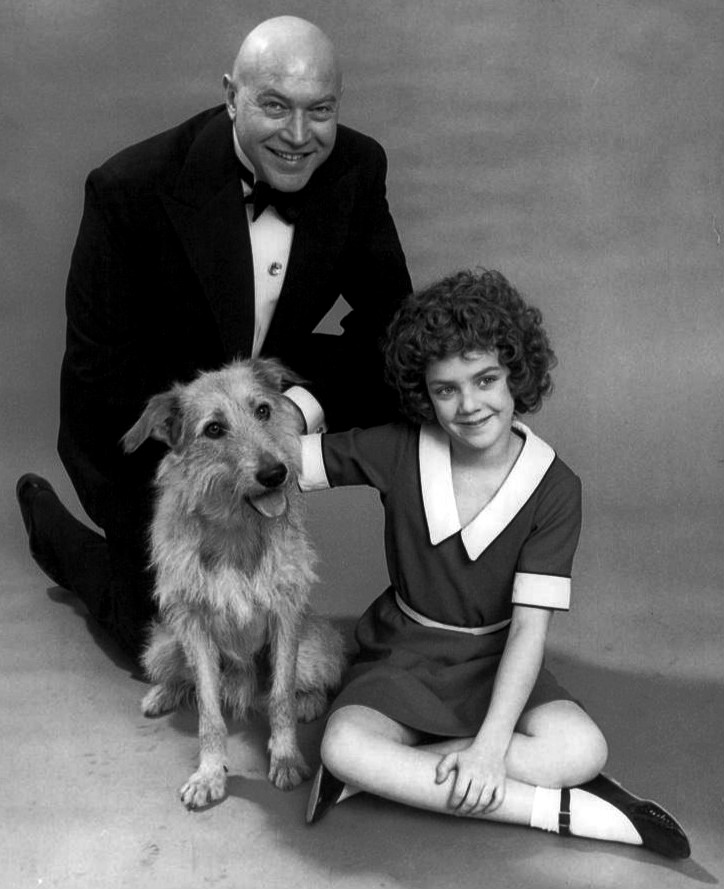
- Shelton as Daddy Warbucks in the musical Annie in 1977.
- Born: October 7, 1924; Salem, Oregon, U.S.
- Died: June 8, 1997 (aged 72); Portland, Oregon, U.S.
- Education: University of Michigan
- Occupations: Stage, television actor
- Years active: 1952–1991

Reid Shelton (October 7, 1924 – June 8, 1997) was an American Broadway and television actor known for appearing in productions of My Fair Lady and Carousel. He originated the role of Oliver Warbucks in Annie.

== Early life and education ==
Shelton was born in Salem, Oregon and graduated from the University of Michigan

== Career ==
He appeared in over 31 TV shows from 1974 to 1990; and nine Broadway shows from 1952 to 1983.

Starting with Wish You Were Here in 1952, he performed several roles in My Fair Lady for six years from 1956 to 1962 including Freddy in the first national tour. He was Mr. Snow in the 1965 Lincoln Center revival of Carousel produced by Richard Rodgers. His Broadway work culminated in originating the role of Oliver Warbucks in Annie, which he played for six years from 1977 to 1983.

Shelton had a lead role in the HBO comedy series 1st & 10 as crusty old football coach Ernie DiNardo, as well as a cameo role in Cheers as a small-time con man. His most famous TV role was Mr. Allen who ran the museum where Blanche Devereaux worked in The Golden Girls.

== Personal life ==
Shelton was married in 1960 to actress Mari McMinn (who also appeared in the original cast of Annie). The marriage ended in divorce four years later.

Shelton died of a stroke in Portland, Oregon, survived by his life partner of 24 years, Donovan Baker.
