= Leonore Fleischer =

American writer

Leonore Fleischer (5 September 1932 – 2009) was an American writer specialising in novelizations of movies. She published over forty novelizations under her own name and a variety of pseudonyms.

== Career ==
In 1969, Fleischer, then a senior editor at Ballantine Books, was invited to write a novelization of the biker film C.C. & Company. She accepted due to financial difficulties caused by her recent divorce, and published the book under the pseudonym Mike Roote, concerned that publishing under her own name would cause problems with her employers.

Fleischer went on to publish six novelizations under the name Roote, including the bestselling novelization of Enter the Dragon. She published a further six under the name Alexander Edwards, as well as several under other pseudonyms, only publishing under her own name once she left her job and began to write freelance full-time.

Fleischer's writing schedule was intense, and she often wrote several novelizations in a year, at one point completing five in thirteen months. Due to this schedule, the short timelines usually expected of tie-in novelizations, and (initially) her full-time job, at times she wrote the books in a matter of days. In the early years of her career they were often completed only with the help of amphetamines.

During the 1970s, at the height of the popularity of the tie-in novelization, Fleischer was called the "den mother of novelizers" by Signature magazine and "the leader of the pack" by Newsweek. Her novelization of Benji (in 1974, as Allison Thomas) sold over three million copies, and her novelization of A Star Is Born (in 1976, as Alexander Edwards) over a million. Writing about her process, she said: "I paint by numbers, I confess it. I pad out, supply background, impute motivation, invent gestures. I ride on the coat-tails of somebody else's creation. But work is work and I'm as good as the best of the rest - just ask my agent. Ask the kids who read Benji. Ask Stephen Sondheim and Tony Perkins; I novelized The Last of Sheila. They loved my book; I never saw their film. I never see any of the films. I'm lucky if I get to see stills."

In 1985, as the popularity of novelizations decreased, she expressed the belief that the field was dying. However, she continued to write prolifically throughout the 1980s and into the 1990s, including novelizations of Annie, Rain Man and The Net, alongside non-fiction books on Joni Mitchell and Dolly Parton, and the Hearts and Diamonds teen fiction series.

== Works ==
- As Mike Roote
  - C.C. & Company (1970)
  - Born To Win (1970)
  - Scorpio (1972)
  - Prime Cut (1972)
  - Badge 373 (1973)
  - Enter the Dragon (1973)
- As Philip Fenty
  - Superfly (1972)
- As Alexander Edwards
  - McQ (1973)
  - The Last of Sheila (1973)
  - Our Time (1974)
  - Katherine (1975)
  - The Black Bird (1975)
  - A Star Is Born (1976)
- As Allison Thomas
  - Benji (1975)
  - It Must Be Love (1976)
- As Webster Carey
  - Part 2: Walking Tall (1975)
- As Leonore Fleischer
  - Funny Lady (1975)
  - Lipstick (1976)
  - The Lords of Flatbush (1977)
  - Ice Castles (1978)
  - Heaven Can Wait (1978)
  - Running (1979)
  - The Rose (1979)
  - Fame (1980)
  - Annie (1982)
  - Making Love (1982)
  - Breathless (1983)
  - Staying Alive (1983)
  - It Came upon the Midnight Clear (1984)
  - Sweet Dreams (1985)
  - Agnes of God (1986)
  - Three Amigos (1987)
  - Betrayed (1988)
  - Sweet Hearts Dance (1988)
  - Rain Man (1989)
  - Flatliners (1990)
  - The Fisher King (1991)
  - Hero (1992)
  - Shadowlands (1994)
  - Junior (1994)
  - Mary Shelley's Frankenstein (1994)
  - Rapa Nui (1994)
  - The Net (1995)
  - Les misérables (1998)
  - 8mm (1999)
