= Eisner Award for Best Archival Collection/Project—Strips =

American comic book award

Eisner Award for Best Archival Collection/Project–Strips
- Awarded for: Best Archival Collection/Project–Strips
- Country: United States
- First award: 2006
- Most recent winner: The George Herriman Library: Krazy & Ignatz 1928–1930, edited by J. Michael Catron and Bill Blackbeard
- Website: www.comic-con.org/awards/eisner-awards/

The Eisner Award for Best Archival Collection/Project–Strips is an award for "creative achievement" in American comic books. It has been given out every year since 2006. From 1993 to 2005 an award called Best Archival Collection/Project was awarded between, at which point it was split into two awards, one for comic strips and the other for comic books. To be eligible, the original comics must be at least 20-years old.

== Name change ==
The award was launched as Best Archival Collection/Project–Comic Strips in 2006, but was later shortened to Best Archival Collection/Project–Strips.

== Winners and nominees ==
Year	Title	Authors	Ref.
2000s
2006	The Complete Calvin and Hobbes (Andrews McMeel)	by Bill Watterson	
2006	The Complete Peanuts: 1955-1956, and The Complete Peanuts: 1957-1958 (Fantagraphics)	by Charles Schulz	
2006	Krazy and Ignatz: The Komplete Kat Komics (Fantagraphics)	by George Herriman	
2006	Little Nemo in Slumberland: So Many Splendid Sundays (Sunday Press Books)	by Winsor McCay	
2006	Walt and Skeezix (Drawn & Quarterly)	by Frank King	
2007	The Complete Peanuts: 1959-1960 and The Complete Peanuts:1961-1962 (Fantagraphics)	by Charles Schulz	
2007	Mary Perkins, On Stage (Classic Comics Press)	by Leonard Starr	
2007	Moomin (Drawn & Quarterly)	by Tove Jansson	
2007	Popeye: I Yam What I Yam (Fantagraphics)	by E.C. Segar	
2007	Walt and Skeezix, vol. 2 (Drawn & Quarterly)	by Frank King	
2008	Complete Terry and the Pirates, vol. 1 (IDW Publishing)	by Milton Caniff	
2008	(The Complete) Dream of the Rarebit Fiend (Ulrich Merkl)	by Winsor McCay	
2008	Little Sammy Sneeze (Sunday Press Books)	by Winsor McCay	
2008	Popeye, vol. 2: Well Blow Me Down (Fantagraphics)	by E.C. Segar	
2008	Sundays with Walt and Skeezix (Sunday Press Books)	by Frank King	
2009	Little Nemo in Slumberland, Many More Splendid Sundays (Sunday Press Books)	by Winsor McCay	
2009	The Complete Little Orphan Annie (IDW Publishing)	by Harold Gray	
2009	Explainers (Fantagraphics)	by Jules Feiffer	
2009	Scorchy Smith and the Art of Noel Sickles (IDW Publishing)	by Noel Sickles	
2009	Willie and Joe (Fantagraphics)	by Bill Mauldin	
2010s
2010	Bloom County: The Complete Library, vol. 1 (IDW Publishing)	by Berkeley Breathed, edited by Scott Dunbier	
2010	Bringing Up Father, vol. 1: From SEA to Shining Sea (IDW Publishing)	by George McManus and Zeke Zekley, edited by Dean Mullaney	
2010	The Brinkley Girls: The Best of Nell Brinkley's Cartoons 1913–1940 (Fantagraphics)	by Nell Brinkley, edited by Trina Robbins	
2010	Gahan Wilson: 50 Years of Playboy Cartoons (Fantagraphics)	by Gahan Wilson, edited by Gary Groth	
2010	Prince Valiant, vol. 1: 1937–1938 (Fantagraphics)	by Hal Foster, edited by Kim Thompson	
2010	Queer Visitors from the Marvelous Land of Oz (Sunday Press Books)	by L. Frank Baum, Walt McDougall, and W. W. Denslow	
2011	Archie: The Complete Daily Newspaper Strips, 1946–1948 (IDW Publishing)	by Bob Montana, edited by Greg Goldstein	
2011	40: A Doonesbury Retrospective (Andrews McMeel)	by G.B. Trudeau	
2011	George Herriman's Krazy Kat: A Celebration of Sundays (Sunday Press Books)	by George Herriman, edited by Patrick McDonnell and Peter Maresca	
2011	Polly and Her Pals Complete Sunday Comics, vol. 1 (IDW Publishing)	by Cliff Sterrett, edited by Dean Mullaney	
2011	Roy Crane's Captain Easy, vol. 1 (Fantagraphics)	by Roy Crane, edited by Rick Norwood	
2012	Walt Disney's Mickey Mouse vols. 1-2 (Fantagraphics)	by Floyd Gottfredson, edited by David Gerstein and Gary Groth	
2012	Flash Gordon and Jungle Jim (IDW Publishing/Library of American Comics)	by Alex Raymond and Don W. Moore, edited by Dean Mullaney	
2012	Forgotten Fantasy: Sunday Comics 1900-1915 (Sunday Press Books)	edited by Peter Maresca	
2012	Prince Valiant vols. 3-4 (Fantagraphics)	by Hal Foster, edited by Kim Thompson	
2012	Tarpé Mills's Miss Fury Sensational Sundays, 1944-1949 (IDW Publishing/Library of American Comics)	by Tarpé Mills, edited by Trina Robbins	
2013	Pogo, vol. 2: Bona Fide Balderdash (Fantagraphics)	by Walt Kelly, edited by Carolyn Kelly and Kim Thompson	
2013	Alex Raymond's Flash Gordon and Jungle Jim, vol. 2 (IDW Publishing/Library of American Comics)	by Alex Raymond, edited by Dean Mullaney	
2013	Mister Twee Deedle: Raggedy Ann's Sprightly Cousin (Fantagraphics)	by Johnny Gruelle, edited by Rick Marschall	
2013	Percy Crosby's Skippy, vol. 1 (IDW Publishing/Library of American Comics)	by Percy Crosby, edited by Jared Gardner and Dean Mullaney	
2013	Roy Crane's Captain Easy: The Complete Sunday Newspaper Strips, vol. 3 (Fantagraphics)	by Roy Crane, edited by Rick Norwood	
2014	Tarzan: The Complete Russ Manning Newspaper Strips, vol. 1 (Library of American Comics/IDW Publishing)	by Russ Manning, edited by Dean Mullaney	
2014	Barnaby, vol. 1 (Fantagraphics)	by Crockett Johnson, edited by Philip Nel and Eric Reynolds	
2014	Percy Crosby's Skippy Daily Comics, vol. 2: 1928–1930 (Library of American Comics/IDW Publishing)	by Percy Crosby, edited by Jared Gardner and Dean Mullaney	
2014	Prince Valiant vols. 6-7 (Fantagraphics)	by Hal Foster, edited by Kim Thompson	
2014	Society Is Nix: Gleeful Anarchy at the Dawn of the American Comic Strip (Sunday Press Books)	edited by Peter Maresca	
2014	VIP: The Mad World of Virgil Partch (Fantagraphics)	by Virgil Partch, edited by Jonathan Barli	
2015	Winsor McCay's Complete Little Nemo (Taschen)	by Winsor McCay, edited by Alexander Braun	
2015	Edgar Rice Burroughs's Tarzan: The Sunday Comics, 1933–1935 (Dark Horse Comics)	by Hal Foster, edited by Brendan Wright	
2015	Moomin: The Deluxe Anniversary Edition (Drawn & Quarterly)	by Tove Jansson, edited by Tom Devlin	
2015	Pogo, vol. 3: Evidence to the Contrary (Fantagraphics)	by Walt Kelly, edited by Carolyn Kelly and Eric Reynolds	
2015	Walt Disney's Mickey Mouse, vols. 5-6 (Fantagraphics)	by Floyd Gottfredson, edited by David Gerstein and Gary Groth	
2016	The Eternaut (Fantagraphics)	by Héctor Germán Oesterheld and Francisco Solano López, edited by Gary Groth and Kristy Valenti	
2016	Beyond Mars (IDW Publishing/Library of American Comics)	by Jack Williamson and Lee Elias, edited by Dean Mullaney	
2016	Cartoons for Victory (Fantagraphics)	by Warren Bernard	
2016	The Complete Funky Winkerbean, vol. 4 (Black Squirrel Books)	by Tom Batiuk, edited by Mary Young	
2016	Kremos: The Lost Art of Niso Ramponi, vols. 1 and 2 (Picture This Press/Lost Art Books)	by Niso Ramponi, edited by Joseph P. Procopio	
2016	White Boy in Skull Valley (Sunday Press Books)	by Garrett Price, edited by Peter Maresca	
2017	Chester Gould's Dick Tracy, Colorful Cases of the 1930s (Sunday Press Books)	by Chester Gould, edited by Peter Maresca	
2017	Almost Completely Baxter: New and Selected Blurtings (New York Review Comics)	by Glen Baxter	
2017	Barnaby, vol. 3 (Fantagraphics)	by Crockett Johnson, edited by Philip Nel and Eric Reynolds	
2017	The Realist Cartoons (Fantagraphics)	edited by Paul Krassner and Ethan Persoff	
2017	Walt and Skeezix 1931–1932 (Drawn & Quarterly)	by Frank King, edited by Jeet Heer and Chris Ware	
2018	Celebrating Snoopy (Andrews McMeel)	by Charles M. Schulz, edited by Alexis E. Fajardo and Dorothy O'Brien	
2018	Crazy Quilt: Scraps and Panels on the Way to Gasoline Alley (Sunday Press Books)	by Frank King, edited by Peter Maresca	
2018	Foolish Questions and Other Odd Observations (Sunday Press Books)	by Rube Goldberg, edited by Peter Maresca and Paul C. Tumey	
2018	Sky Masters of the Space Force: The Complete Dailies (Hermes Press)	by Jack Kirby, Wally Wood, et al., edited by Daniel Herman	
2018	Star Wars: The Classic Newspaper Strips, vol. 1 (Library of American Comics/IDW Publishing)	by Russ Manning, et al., edited by Dean Mullaney	
2019	Star Wars: Classic Newspaper Strips, vol. 3 (Library of American Comics/IDW Publishing)	by Archie Goodwin and Al Williamson, edited by Dean Mullaney	
2019	Pogo, vol. 5: Out of This World at Home (Fantagraphics)	by Walt Kelly, edited by Mark Evanier and Eric Reynolds	
2019	Sky Masters of the Space Force: The Complete Sunday Strips in Color (1959–1960) (Amigo Comics)	by Jack Kirby, Wally Wood, et al., edited by Ferran Delgado	
2019	The Temple of Silence: Forgotten Words and Worlds of Herbert Crowley (Beehive Books)	by Justin Duerr	
2019	Thimble Theatre and the Pre-Popeye Comics of E. C. Segar (Sunday Press Books)	by E.C. Segar, edited by Peter Maresca	
2020s
2020	Krazy Kat: The Complete Color Sundays (Taschen)	by George Herriman, edited by Alexander Braun	
2020	Cham: The Best Comic Strips and Graphic Novelettes, 1839–1862 (University Press of Mississippi)	by David Kunzle	
2020	Ed Leffingwell's Little Joe (Sunday Press Books)	by Harold Gray, edited by Peter Maresca and Sammy Harkham	
2020	The George Herriman Library: Krazy & Ignatz 1916–1918 (Fantagraphics)	by George Herriman, edited by RJ Casey	
2020	Madness in Crowds: The Teeming Mind of Harrison Cady (Beehive Books)	by Harrison Cady, edited by Violet Kitchen and Denis Kitchen	
2020	Pogo, Vol. 6: Clean as a Weasel (Fantagraphics)	by Walt Kelly, edited by Mark Evanier and Eric Reynolds	
2021	The Flapper Queens: Women Cartoonists of the Jazz Age (Fantagraphics)	edited by Trina Robbins	
2021	Gross Exaggerations: The Meshuga Comic Strips of Milt Gross (Sunday Press Books/IDW Publishing)	by Milt Gross, edited by Peter Maresca	
2021	Krazy & Ignatz 1919-1921 by George Herriman (Fantagraphics)	by George Herriman, edited by RJ Casey	
2021	Little Debbie and the Second Coming of Elmo: Daily Comic Strips, August 1960 – September 1961 (Labor of Love Publications)	by Cecil Jensen, edited by Frank Young	
2021	Pogo The Complete Syndicated Comic Strips: Volume 7: Clean as a Weasel (Fantagraphics)	by Walt Kelly, edited by Mark Evanier and Eric Reynolds	
2022	Popeye: The E.C. Segar Sundays, vol. 1 (Fantagraphics)	by E.C. Segar, edited by Gary Groth and Conrad Groth	
2022	Friday Foster: The Sunday Strips (Ablaze Publishing)	by Jim Lawrence and Jorge Longarón, edited by Christopher Marlon, Rich Young, and Kevin Ketner	
2022	Trots and Bonnie (New York Review Comics)	by Shary Flenniken, edited by Norman Hathaway	
2022	The Way of Zen (Princeton University Press)	adapted and illustrated by C. C. Tsai, translated by Brian Bruya	
2023	Come Over Come Over, It's So Magic, and My Perfect Life (Drawn & Quarterly)	by Lynda Barry	
2023	Bungleton Green and the Mystic Commandos (New York Review Comics)	by Jay Jackson	
2023	The George Herriman Library: Krazy & Ignatz 1922-1924 (Fantagraphics)	by George Herriman, edited by J. Michael Catron	
2023	Macanudo: Welcome to Elsewhere (Fantagraphics)	by Liniers, edited by Gary Groth	
2023	Pogo The Complete Syndicated Comic Strips: Volume 8: Hijinks from the Horn of Plenty (Fantagraphics)	by Walt Kelly, edited by Mark Evanier and Eric Reynolds	
2024	Dauntless Dames: High-Heeled Heroes of the Comic Strips (Fantagraphics)	edited by Peter Maresca and Trina Robbins	
2024	David Wright’s Carol Day: Lance Hallam (Slingsby Bros, Ink!)	edited by Roger Clark, Chris Killackey, and Guy Mills	
2024	Popeye Sundays Vol 3: The Sea Hag and Alice the Goon (Fantagraphics)	by E.C. Segar, edited by Conrad Groth and Gary Groth	
2024	Walt Disney’s Silly Symphonies 1932-1935: Starring Bucky Bug and Donald Duck and Walt Disney’s Silly Symphonies 1935-1939: Starring Donald Duck and Big Bad Wolf	by David Gerstein	
2024	Where I’m Coming From (Drawn & Quarterly)	by Barbara Brandon-Croft, edited by Peggy Burns and Tracy Hurren	
2025	Thorn: The Complete Proto-BONE Strips 1982–1986, and Other Early Drawings	by Jeff Smith	
2025	All in Line	by Saul Steinberg	
2025	Frank Johnson, Secret Pioneer of American Comics, vol. 1	edited by Chris Byrne and Keith Mayerson	
2025	Stan Mack’s Real-Life Funnies: The Collected Conceits, Delusions, and Hijinks of New Yorkers from 1974 to 1995	by Stan Mack, edited by Gary Groth	
2026	The George Herriman Library: Krazy & Ignatz 1928–1930 (Fantagraphics)	edited by J. Michael Catron and Bill Blackbeard	
2026	Arthur Ferrier’s Pin-Up Parade Box Set (Korero Press)	edited by Rian Hughes	
2026	Barnaby, vol. 5: 1950–1952, by Crockett Johnson (Fantagraphics)	edited by Eric Reynolds and Philip Nel	
2026	Rea Irvin’s The Smythes (NYRC)	edited by R. Kikuo Johnson and Dash Shaw	
2026	Terminal Exposure: Comics, Sculpture, and Risky Behavior, by Michael McMillan (NYRC)	edited by Lucas Adams	
