= Tarzan: The Complete Russ Manning Newspaper Strips =

Book series

Publication information
- Publisher: The Library of American Comics
- Format: Hardcover
- Genre: Action; Adventure; Jungle
- Publication date: June 18, 2013 – April 14, 2015
- No. of issues: 4
- Main character: Tarzan

Creative team
- Created by: Edgar Rice Burroughs
- Written by: Russ Manning
- Artist: Russ Manning
- Editor: Dean Mullaney

Tarzan: The Complete Russ Manning Newspaper Strips is a series of books collecting the complete Edgar Rice Burroughs' Tarzan comic strip written and drawn by Russ Manning, an American daily and Sunday strip title originally published in newspapers between 1967 and 1979, via United Feature Syndicate. The first volume of the series was awarded the Eisner Award in the category Best Archival Collection/Project—Strips in 2014. The series was published by The Library of American Comics from 2013 to 2015.

== Format ==
The hardcover volumes of the series measure 11 inches × 8.5 inches (280 mm × 216 mm), the daily strips are reproduced in black-and-white three to a page, while the Sunday pages are reproduced in full color, at one per page. The books come with dustjacket and a sewn ribbon bookmark. The strips have been rearranged from the chronological original output in order to have each's storyline in intact, since the dailies and Sundays had different continuities, therefore all the dailies are presented first and the Sundays are the latter part of each volume.

The first three volumes contain both daily and Sunday strips, while the fourth and final volume only contain Sunday pages, this since Manning decided to give up the daily part of the strip in order to focus his time to produce Tarzan graphic novels, he did however keep on doing the Sunday page until his final year on it in 1979. The strips are reproduced from Edgar Rice Burroughs, Inc.'s original file copies.

Foreword by Russ Mannings assistant on the strip, William Stout is included. Henry G. Franke III, editor of the Edgar Rice Borrughs Amateur Press Association and The Borroughs Bibliophiles, also very well known in the world around Tarzan comics due to his historic articles on the subject, has contributed introductions for the series. Extras such as scans of original art by Manning and memorabilia related to Tarzan and Mannings career are included.

== Volumes ==
Volumes
Volume	Release date	Title	Period	Page count	ISBN
1	2013-06-18	“Tarzan: The Complete Russ Manning Newspaper Strips - Vol. 1”	1967–1969	288	978-1-61377-694-0
2	2013-12-31	“Tarzan: The Complete Russ Manning Newspaper Strips - Vol. 2”	1969–1971	296	978-1-61377-820-3
3	2014-07-29	“Tarzan: The Complete Russ Manning Newspaper Strips - Vol. 3”	1971–1974	296	978-1-61377-982-8
4	2015-04-14	“Tarzan: The Complete Russ Manning Newspaper Strips - Vol. 4”	1974–1979	296	978-1-63140-215-9
