= The Complete Little Orphan Annie =

Book series by Harold Gray

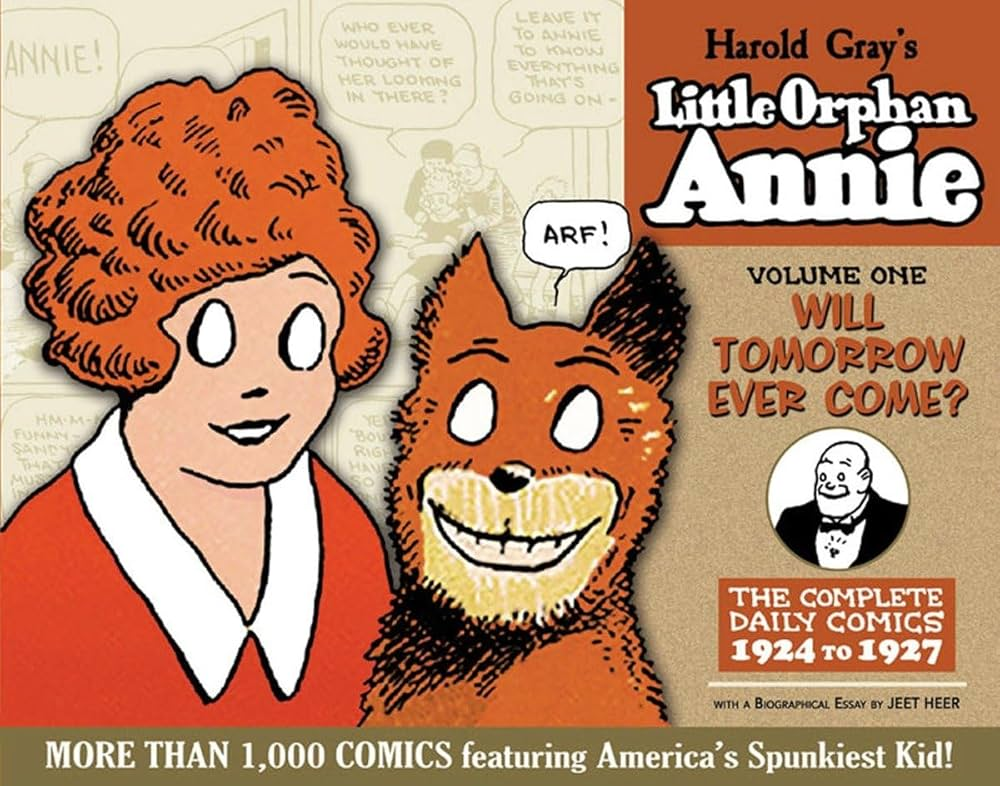
- The cover of volume 1

Publication information
- Publisher: The Library of American Comics
- Format: Hardcover
- Genre: Adventure; Action; Humour
- Publication date: June 2008
- No. of issues: 16 to date
- Main character(s): Annie, Sandy the Dog, Oliver Warbucks, Punjab the Wizard, the omnipotent Mr. Am

Creative team
- Written by: Harold Gray
- Artist: Harold Gray
- Editor: Dean Mullaney

The Complete Little Orphan Annie is a hardcover book series collecting the complete output of the American comic strip, Little Orphan Annie, written and drawn by Harold Gray from the strip's debut in 1924 to Gray's death in 1968. (The newspaper comic strip was published from 1924 to 2010 under the Tribune Media Services syndicate.) The strip was the most popular in its heyday according to a Fortune poll. The publisher of this book series is The Library of American Comics and its first volume was released in June 2008.

== Background ==
The series was first announced in March 2007, by Dean Mullaney of The Library of American Comics, with a planned release in February 2008. After some delays the release date was pushed forward to June, 2008.

This was the third comic strip reprint project initiated by The Library of American Comics, after The Complete Terry and the Pirates and The Complete Chester Gould's Dick Tracy.

== Format ==
The hardcover volumes of this series use a landscape format of 11 inches × 8.5 inches, approximately (280 mm × 216 mm), allowing three daily comic strips or one full Sunday page to be reproduced per page. The strips are chronologically reprinted; the dailies in black-and-white and the Sunday pages in full color. Editing and design for the books was done by Dean Mullaney.

The compilation includes biographical essays about the author, Harold Gray, written by the comics scholar, Jeet Heer, who wrote his doctoral thesis about the Little Orphan Annie comic strip. Essays by other comic industry experts also appear. The comic strips were scanned from original artwork and syndicate proofs of the Harold Gray Archives at Boston University. Extras such as photographs, old strips, reproductions of playbills and period memorabilia tied to the comic strip are included in all volumes. A scholarly index is provided.

== Volumes ==
Volumes
Volume	Release date	Title	Period	Page count	ISBN
1	2008-06-24	Little Orphan Annie: The Complete Daily Comics - Vol. 1 - Will Tomorrow Ever Come?	1924–1927	384	978-1-60010-140-3
2	2009-01-20	Little Orphan Annie: The Complete Daily Comics - Vol. 2 - The Darkest Hour is Just Before Dawn	1927–1929	320	978-1-60010-197-7
3	2009-05-26	Little Orphan Annie: The Complete Dailies & Color Sundays - Vol. 3 - And a Blind Man Shall Lead Them	1929–1931	348	978-1-60010-406-0
4	2009-12-29	Little Orphan Annie: The Complete Dailies & Color Sundays - Vol. 4 - A House Divided (or Will Fate Trick Trixie?)	1932–1933	276	978-1-60010-445-9
5	2010-06-08	Little Orphan Annie: The Complete Dailies & Color Sundays - Vol. 5 - The One-Way Road to Justice	1933–1935	280	978-1-60010-580-7
6	2011-01-18	Little Orphan Annie: The Complete Dailies & Color Sundays - Vol. 6 - Punjab the Wizard	1935–1936	276	978-1-60010-792-4
7	2011-08-30	Little Orphan Annie: The Complete Dailies & Color Sundays - Vol. 7 - The Omnipotent Mr. Am!	1936–1938	276	978-1-60010-995-9
8	2012-06-19	Little Orphan Annie: The Complete Dailies & Color Sundays - Vol. 8 - The Last Port of Call	1938–1940	296	978-1-61377-199-0
9	2013-06-25	Little Orphan Annie: The Complete Dailies & Color Sundays - Vol. 9 - Saints and Cynics	1940–1941	296	978-1-61377-575-2
10	2014-06-10	Little Orphan Annie: The Complete Dailies & Color Sundays - Vol. 10 - The Junior Commandos	1941–1943	296	978-1-61377-951-4
11	2015-05-05	Little Orphan Annie: The Complete Dailies & Color Sundays - Vol. 11 - Death Be Thy Name	1943–1945	288	978-1-63140-223-4
12	2016-01-12	Little Orphan Annie: The Complete Dailies & Color Sundays - Vol. 12 - It's Only a Paper Moon	1945–1947	296	978-1-63140-461-0
13	2016-11-15	Little Orphan Annie: The Complete Dailies & Color Sundays - Vol. 13 - Spies and Counterspies	1947–1948	296	978-1-63140-736-9
14	2017-10-31	Little Orphan Annie: The Complete Dailies & Color Sundays - Vol. 14 - Sunshine and Shadow	1948–1950	272	978-1-63140-977-6
15	2018-11-27	Little Orphan Annie: The Complete Dailies & Color Sundays - Vol. 15 - Open Season for Trouble	1950–1951	276	978-1-68405-351-3
16	2019-11-12	Little Orphan Annie: The Complete Dailies & Color Sundays - Vol. 16 - Here Today, Gone Tomorrow	1951–1953	280	978-1-68405-558-6
17	TBA	Little Orphan Annie: The Complete Dailies & Color Sundays - Vol. 17 - Fifty Miles from Nowhere	1953–1955	264	TBA
