= Sunday Press Books =

American publisher of comic strip reprint collections

- Status: Active
- Founded: 2005
- Founder: Peter Maresca
- Country of origin: United States
- Headquarters location: Palo Alto, California
- Distribution: Penguin Random House
- Key people: Peter Maresca; Linnea Wickstrom
- Publication types: Books
- Fiction genres: Sunday comic strips
- Official website: sundaypressbooks.com

Sunday Press Books is an American publisher of comic strip reprint collections founded in 2005 by Peter Maresca. The company is known as a respected reprinter of comic strips and has to date won four Eisner Awards and two Harvey Awards. Since 2022 the company is partnered with Fantagraphics in distribution and marketing.

== History ==
=== Origin ===
In 2005, Peter Maresca was working in the digital entertainment industry when he, as a hobbyist comic strip collector since his 20s, felt the call to do something important for the upcoming 100th anniversary of the Little Nemo in Slumberland comic strip. He turned to different comic publishers which had published Little Nemo strips before to find out if any of them had something special planned to commemorate this centennial, which he then found out none of them had. He then consulted his own collection of Little Nemo strips and realized that after almost a century after being printed, the collection was becoming very fragile and was beginning to fall apart. In order to save the material for the future he tried to take his material to different publishers to put it in print in order to conserve it and make it available to readers, but none of the ones he contacted wanted to print the material in its original full publication size due to current low demand for the material and also difficulties of finding a suitable printer for the physically large material, the latter a matter which Maresca considered to be an essential aspect if he would allow his material to be put in print.

After the initial trouble of finding a publisher wanting to print his Little Nemo material, he turned to Art Spiegelman to find out if they could accomplish something practical with Maresca's Nemo material. They tried to downsize it to get it to fit a smaller format than its original size, but in the end they both agreed that the material would have to be in such a large format as it had when first published, no smaller format would do it justice. Later the same year Maresca visited the Angoulême International Comics Festival, where he talked to Fershid Bharucha of the French publishing company fr:Éditions USA. Bharucha proposed him to take the material and convert it to digital image files and return with it to him and he would then help him to put together a book ready for printing. Once having found a suitable printer in Malaysia for the project, the project went ahead.

After the Little Nemo in Slumberland book was accomplished by Maresca, he had no further plans for Sunday Press as a publisher, his set goal had been met. He had succeeded producing a fully restored, full-size edition of the Winsor McCay classic - Litte Nemo, and was after this heading back to his regular job in digital entertainment. However, his Nemo book became a widespread success, including winning two Harvey Awards. Just a few months after its publication Maresca reconsidered his plans for Sunday Press and began thinking about what it should do next. At this time, Maresca was approached by Chris Ware, a well-known artist in the comics industry, wanting to work with Maresca on a volume of the same high standard and large format as the just-released Nemo book, but now this treatment would be applied to Gasoline Alley. Maresca accepted the offer and he and Ware put together the second Sunday Press title; Sundays with Walt and Skeezix. After this Maresca continued on his own with the publishing company's third volume, an edition of Little Sammy Sneeze, after these first three titles published he considered himself as an actual publisher and decided to keep the enterprise going.

In 2007 Sunday Press Books became a family business, when Maresca's wife Linnea Wickstrom joined the company to edit articles for the books and also managing the company. At the same time their son got also employed to take care of scanning, shipping and convention work.

=== Later developments ===
Eight years after the company's launch, Maresca did in an interview in October 2013 express that even though he is very passionate about Sunday Press' work, he stated "I hope to work with other publishers on strip-related material and partner with artists and writers to bring their favorite 'commercially unviable' projects to print", since the selling and marketing tasks are a demanding task just by itself for a micropublisher like Sunday Press Books.

==== IDW Publishing partnership ====
In July, 2019 it was announced that IDW Publishing had acquired Sunday Press Books. It was stated that Peter Maresca would be continuing to '"oversee the publishing program" of the company while IDW would manage parts such as marketing and distribution, for print as well as for digital publication. This way the publisher (SP) could focus the major work to recover comic strips which otherwise could be at risk to disappear for eternity, while IDW would manage the business aspects of the publishing company. For IDW the acquisition fits their portfolio well since their imprint The Library of American Comics and their Artist's Editions line of books already are in the same kind of archival territory. Later Maresca himself stated that the joint between Sunday Press and IDW Publishing was not an acquisition on IDW's part but a publishing agreement between the two companies. A strictly marketing and distribution agreement, with Sunday Press Books keeping its whole independency. But in the future, the partnership between the two companies would come to include some joint projects, some done by just IDW and other solely done by Sunday Press.

==== Fantagraphics partnership ====
In July 2022 it was announced that Sunday Press had partnered with Fantagraphics in a deal concerning distribution of the existing Sunday Press catalogue via Fantagraphics and also with start in 2023, the publication of new books under the Sunday Press imprint.

== Publication information ==
Being a smaller publisher in the hardcover comic market, Sunday Press Books' print run for each title typically varies from 1,500 to 3,000 copies per printing, with the bestselling titles often going into several printings, the two Little Nemo in Slumberland books have for example had over 12,000 copies sold by October 2013. A typical volume of a Sunday Press book takes on average close to a year to produce, the material assembly process is the longest task taking in between six and nine months to finish and get ready for printing, then the binding process takes around six weeks of time due to the publications often are handbound, after this the shipping from the printer in Asia to the U.S. takes another month.

=== Format ===
All book titles by Sunday Press are hardcover, have handsewn binding and are printed in large formats spanning from 10 × 10 inches (254 × 254 mm) to 16 × 21 inches (406 × 533 mm). The largest format resembles and recreates the feel of an original broadsheet page size, on which comic strips where to be found in newspapers during the early 1900s.

=== Restoration ===
Maresca is diligent of reproducing the old comic strips in such a way in the Sunday Press books to allow the reader to as such a close experience to the original as possible. Therefore, Maresca goes great lengths to recreate the original look and feel of the strips, printing the books with a matte paper quality, similar to newsprint look and size-wise. Maresca usually works up to an hour, at times more, to fully restore a full page of comics. All color of the source material is corrected for accuracy prior to being reproduced, a process necessary due to the old newspaper medium which the strips originally were printed on, do fade and deteriorate with time. Maresca himself describes his reproduced look as "a hybrid between a brand new newsprint and a comic strip that looks kind of faded.". Some of the source material for the publisher's reprint books comes from Maresca's own collections, others are often sourced from other comic strip collectors.

== Recognition ==
Many of Sunday Press' published titles have been well received in the comic culture, titles have been featured and reviewed in newspapers and periodicals such as The Atlantic, The Comics Journal, The New York Review of Books, The New York Times, Print and The Wall Street Journal. They have also received recognition such as nominations and prizes for both the Eisner Award and Harvey Award.

=== Eisner Awards ===
==== Nominations ====
- 2006 — "Best Archival Collection/Project - Comic Strips" — Little Nemo in Slumberland: So Many Splendid Sundays
- 2008
  - "Best Archival Collection/Project—Strips" — Little Sammy Sneeze
  - "Best Archival Collection/Project—Strips" — Sundays with Walt and Skeezix
  - "Best Publication Design" — Litte Sammy Sneeze, designed by Philippe Ghielmetti
  - "Best Publication Design" — Sundays with Walt and Skeezix, designed by Chris Ware
- 2010
  - "Best Archival Collection/Project - Strips" — Queer Visitors from the Marvelous Land of Oz
  - "Best Publication Design" — Queer Visitors from the Marvelous Land of Oz, designed by Philippe Ghielmetti
- 2011 — "Best Archival Collection/project - Strips" — Krazy Kat: A Celebration of Sundays
- 2012 — "Best Archival Collection/Project - Strips" — Forgotten Fantasy: Sunday Comics 1900-1915
- 2014 — "Best Archival Collection/Project - Strips" — Society Is Nix: Gleeful Anarchy at the Dawn of the American Comic Strip
- 2016 — "Best Archival Collection/Project - Strips" — White Boy in Skull Valley
- 2018
  - "Best Archival Collection/Project - Strips" — Crazy Quilt: Scraps and Panels on the Way to Gasoline Alley
  - "Best Archival Collection/Project - Strips" — Foolish Questions and Other Odd Observations
- 2019 — "Best Archival Collection/Project - Strips" — Thimble Theatre and the pre-Popeye Comics of E.C. Segar
- 2020 — "Best Archival Collection/Project - Strips" — Ed Leffingwell's Little Joe

==== Award winners ====
- 2006 — "Best Publication Design" — Little Nemo in Slumberland: So Many Splendid Sundays
- 2009 — "Best Archival Collection/Project - Strips" — Little Nemo in Slumberland: Many More Splendid Sundays
- 2017 — "Best Archival Collection/Project - Strips (at least 20 years old)" — Chester Gould's Dick Tracy, Colorful Cases of the 1930s

=== Harvey Awards ===
==== Award winners ====
- 2006
  - "Best Domestic Reprint Project" — Little Nemo in Slumberland: So Many Splendid Sundays
  - "Special Award Excellence in Presentation" — Little Nemo in Slumberland: So Many Splendid Sundays

== Publications ==
=== Books ===
Titles
Release date	Title	Creator(s)	Period(s)	Content	Bonus item	Format	Page count	ISBN
2005-10-02	Little Nemo in Slumberland: So Many Splendid Sundays!	Winsor McCay	1905-1910	Little Nemo in Slumberland selected Sunday pages from 1905-1910	none	16×21 inches	128	978-0-97688-851-2
2007-10-08	Sundays with Walt & Skeezix	Frank King	1918-1932	Selection of Sunday pages from Gasoline Alley 1918-1932	Original art facsimile poster	16×21 inches	96	978-0-97688-852-9
2007-11-01	Little Sammy Sneeze	Winsor McCay	1904-1906	The complete Little Sammy Sneeze in color The complete Hungry Henrietta; The Woozlebeasts 1904 comic The Upside-Downs 1904 comic	Limited Sammy Sneeze Tissue Box Cover freebie	16×18 inches	96	978-0-97688-854-3
2008-07-24	Little Nemo in Slumberland: Many More Splendid Sundays!	Winsor McCay	1906-1914; 1924-1927	Little Nemo in Slumberland selected pages from 1906-1914 and 1924-1927	Gertie the Dinosaur flip book	16×21 inches	128	978-0-97688-855-0
2009-06-22	Queer Visitors from the Marvelous Land of Oz	L. Frank Baum; Walt McDougall; W.W. Denslow	1904-1905?	The complete Queer Visitors from the Marvelous Land of Oz Sunday series the complete Scarecrow and the Tinman additional full-size comics by the creators	Set of Visitors collector cards	16×18 inches	72	978-0-97688-856-7
2009-09-15	The Upside-Down World of Gustave Verbeek	Gustave Verbeek	1903-1915	The complete The Upside-Downs of Little Lady Lovekins and Old Man Muffaroo the complete Loony Lyrics of Lulu selected Sundays of Adventures of the Tiny Tads additional comics and illustrations from Verbeek's 40-year career	12-piece set of Tiny Tads postcards (replicas from the 1907 series by Verbeek)	11×16 inches	120	978-0-97688-857-4
2010-05-18	Krazy Kat: A Celebration of Sundays	George Herriman	1916-1944	Selected Krazy Kat Sunday pages from 1916-1944 samples from Sunday pages of Professor Otto, The Two Jackies, Major Ozone + more, these from 1901-1906	Sunday Press Bricks postcards, featuring 10 characters getting "bricked"	14×17 inches	160	978-0-97688-858-1
2011-08-01	Forgotten Fantasy: Sunday Comics 1900-1915	various	1900-1915	Over 150 various fantasy comic strips from 1900-1915 included among others are: the complete Wee Willie Winkie's World and the complete The Kin-der-Kids by Lyonel Feininger the complete The Explorigator by Henry Grant Dart the complete Naughty Pete by Charles Forbell the complete Nibsby the Newsboy by George McManus the complete Dream of the Rarebit Fiend by Winsor McCay selections from Jungle Imps and other titles from 1900-1915	4-page facsimile of the announcement of Feininger's Kind-der Kids	16×21 inches	156	978-0-97688-859-8
2013-10-24	Society Is Nix: Gleeful Anarchy at the Dawn of the American Comic Strip	various	1895-1915	150 Sunday page comic strips from 1895-1915 by various creators	facsimile of F. Hopper's Happy Hooligan cut-out game	16×21 inches	156	978-0-98355-041-9
2016-01-08	White Boy in Skull Valley	Garrett Price	1933-193?	The complete White Boy / Skull Valley Sunday comic strips	White Boy tabloid poster	11×16 inches	168	978-0-98355-042-6
2016-10-24	Dick Tracy: Colorful Cases of the 1930s	Chester Gould	1931-1939	Selection of Dick Tracy Sunday comic strips from 1931 to 1939 four complete stories plus 40 selected Sunday pages	4-page replica of the original 1931 sell sheet for Dick Tracy from the Tribune Syndicate; Dick Tracy poster page (only if purchased from publisher website)	11×15 inches	168	978-0-98355-043-3
2017-06-01	Foolish Questions & Other Odd Observations: Rube Goldberg, early comics 1909-1919	Rube Goldberg	1909-1919	The complete Sunday comic strip Foolish Questions from 1909-1910 selected strips of the daily equivalent of the Foolish Questions strip series from 1910-1919	Facsimile set of 4 Foolish Questions postcards from 1913	10×10 inches	96	978-0-98355-044-0
2017-12-18	Crazy Quilt by Frank King: Scraps and Panels on the Way to Gasoline Alley, Comics from 1909-1919	Frank King	1909-1919	The complete Crazy Quilt; Samplings from each of Frank King's different early Sunday and daily comic strips, including; Bobby Make-Believe editorial cartoon pieces	Facsimile of the Motorcycle Mike action toy from 1914	13×17 inches	100	978-0-98355-045-7
2018-11-01	Thimble Theatre: And the pre-Popeye comics of E.C. Segar	E.C. Segar	1916-1930	125 pre-Popeye Thimble Theatre Sunday pages including the complete "Western desert" saga Samples of E.C. Segar's early comics and illustrations	none	13×17 inches	144	978-0-98355-046-4
2020-04-07	Ed Leffingwell's Little Joe: The Sunday Comics by Harold Gray	Harold Gray	1937-1942	Selection of Little Joe Sunday strips by Harold Gray from 1937 to 1942	none	13×9 inches	144	978-0-98355-047-1
2020-11-17	Gross Exaggerations: The Meshuga Comic Strips of Milt Gross	Milt Gross	TBA	The comic strips: Nize Baby, Count Screwloose and Dave's Delicatessen + other comic strips + material from books and magazines	none	13x17 inches	144	978-0-98355-048-8
2023-09-19	Dauntless Dames: High-Heeled Heroes of the Comics	various	TBA	TBA	Fold-out section with a dozen paper doll cutouts starring the most popular women comic strip characters from the featured era	13 × 16.5 inches	160	978-1-68396-780-4

=== Calendars ===
Sunday Press Books has except from their main line of reprint books also produced some comic related calendars with comic art of the same kind as featured in their books.
