= Li'l Abner: The Complete Dailies & Color Sundays =

American comic strip collection by Al Capp

Publication information
- Publisher: The Library of American Comics
- Schedule: inconsistent
- Format: Hardcover
- Genre: Adventure; Political satire Social satire Humour
- Publication date: April 2010
- Main character(s): Li'l Abner Yokum; Daisy Mae Scragg (later Yokum); Mammy Yokum (Pansy Hunks); Pappy Yokum (Lucifer Ornamental Yokum); Honest Abe Yokum; Tiny Yokum; Salomey

Creative team
- Written by: Al Capp
- Artist(s): Al Capp
- Editor(s): Dean Mullaney

Li'l Abner: The Complete Dailies & Color Sundays, also known as The Complete Li'l Abner, is a series collecting the American comic strip Li'l Abner written and drawn by Al Capp, originally distributed by the syndicate United Feature Syndicate and later by Chicago Tribune New York News Syndicate, in total during 43 years before the strip ended. The strip debuted in August 1934 and at its peak, it had an estimated readership of over 60 million people regularly. The collection is published by The Library of American Comics.

== Background ==
On January 26, 2010, The Library of American Comics announced that their next reprint series would be a collection of Al Capp's Li'l Abner, the first volume of the series' was planned to be released in April the same year. This would be the comic strip's first reprint since Denis Kitchen and his Kitchen Sink Press' effort to publish the comic strip as a whole during the 1990s, which ended without a completion after the company went under.

However, LoAC's venture also ended with an incomplete run, as publication of further volumes ceased in 2017.

Dark Horse has later reprinted the years of the strip when Frank Frazetta assisted Capp on the strip.

== Format ==
The hardcover volumes of the series' measure 9.25 x 12.5 inches, (235 mm × 318 mm), have 270 pages per book on average and come with a dust jacket. They contain the chronological daily strips in black-and-white and for the first time since the original newspaper publication the Sunday pages are reproduced in full color. The daily strips have a separate plot from the Sunday strips. Each volume contains approximately 700 strips. The books are designed and edited by Dean Mullaney, feature biographical essays written by Bruce Canwell and introductions by Denis Kitchen. The collection also include the proto-Abner comic strip, Big Leviticus, which Al Capp created one year prior to Li'l Abner's launch, this while he ghosted both writing and drawing on the other comic strip Joe Palooka for Ham Fisher.

== Recognition ==
- 2011 - The series was nominated for the Harvey Award in the category, "Best Domestic Reprint Project".

== Volumes ==
Volumes
Volume	Release date	Title	Period	Page count	ISBN
1	2010-04-20	“Li'l Abner: The Complete Dailies & Color Sundays - Vol. 1”	1934–1936	288	978-1-60010-611-8
2	2010-11-30	“Li'l Abner: The Complete Dailies & Color Sundays - Vol. 2”	1937–1938	272	978-1-60010-745-0
3	2011-06-21	“Li'l Abner: The Complete Dailies & Color Sundays - Vol. 3”	1939–1940	272	978-1-60010-937-9
4	2012-02-07	“Li'l Abner: The Complete Dailies & Color Sundays - Vol. 4”	1941–1942	272	978-1-61377-123-5
5	2013-01-29	“Li'l Abner: The Complete Dailies & Color Sundays - Vol. 5”	1943–1944	272	978-1-61377-514-1
6	2013-12-24	“Li'l Abner: The Complete Dailies & Color Sundays - Vol. 6”	1945–1946	272	978-1-61377-819-7
7	2014-12-23	“Li'l Abner: The Complete Dailies & Color Sundays - Vol. 7”	1947–1948	272	978-1-63140-156-5
8	2016-05-10	“Li'l Abner: The Complete Dailies & Color Sundays - Vol. 8”	1949–1950	272	978-1-63140-594-5
9	2017-12-19	“Li'l Abner: The Complete Dailies & Color Sundays - Vol. 9”	1951–1952	256	978-1-68405-057-4
