= Belinda (comic strip) =

Belinda panels from 1950.

Belinda, also known as Belinda Blue-Eyes, was a newspaper comic strip created in 1936 by the cartoonist Steve Dowling (1904-1986) and scripted by Bill Connor. It was published in the UK newspaper Daily Mirror.

In The Penguin Book of Comics, George Perry and Alan Aldridge wrote, "Belinda Blue Eyes was a perpetual waif, a British counterpart to the transatlantic Little Orphan Annie. Over the years she grew slowly. By 1959 when the strip ended, she had just about reached the stage when she needed a bra."

In 1943, Tony Royle took over as the artist. During World War II, the title was shortened to Belinda. Royle continued to draw the strip with writer Don Freeman until the end of its run on 17 October 1959. Royle retired to Badsey in Worcestershire, England, where he died March 1986.

== Strip chronology ==
L100 - L219 1952-04-28 to 1952-09-13 Professor Belinda
