= Walt and Skeezix =

Book series by Frank King

Publication information
- Publisher: Drawn & Quarterly
- Format: Hardcover
- Genre: Slice of Life; Humor
- Publication date: June 2005
- No. of issues: 8 volumes to date
- Main character(s): Walt Wallet; Skeezix

Creative team
- Written by: Frank King
- Artist: Frank King
- Editor(s): Jeet Heer; Chris Ware

Walt and Skeezix is a hardcover book collection of the daily comic strips of Gasoline Alley, an American comic strip written and drawn by Frank King, originally syndicated in newspapers by Tribune Content Agency between 1918 and 1969. The collection is published by the Canadian publisher Drawn & Quarterly; the first volume of the series was released in 2005.

== Background ==
John Benson had already made an unsuccessful attempt to produce a collection of Gasoline Alley comic strips through Kitchen Sink Press in the 1990s.

The publication began with the comic creator and collector Joe Matt, who had been collecting Frank King's daily and Sunday Gasoline Alley strips for some time and had accumulated a sizable collection of the strip. He introduced some of the strips's prime material to Chris Oliveros of Drawn & Quarterly, convincing him that it was worth publication. Chris Ware had also been collecting the strip in clippings and merchandising, and Drawn & Quarterly reached out to him for additional material once the project had started. Jeet Heer was also contacted to participate by Oliveros due to his knowledge of Heer's many writings on comic strip history.

In January 2009, after publication of three volumes of the series, it was put on hiatus due to what Oliveros described as threats of a lawsuit by Tribune Media (the original syndicate behind the Gasoline Alley strip) if the reprint was to continue publication. Steve Tippie, VP of Marketing and Licensing of Tribune Media, responded a week later that he was unsure what Oliveros was referring to, and that Tribune Media had not sued nor threatened to sue Drawn & Quarterly over what they were currently publishing. In mid 2010 the series resumed with the release of its fourth volume.

The whole daily strip output of Frank King's Gasoline Alley spans from 1918 to 1969. According to editor Jeet Heer, as of 2014, the publisher had not decided how many volumes the series would have. However, Heer stated that he would like to get out as much of King's material as possible. The series' editors have pondered the idea of an ending of the series shortly after WWII since, after that point, the comic strip started being produced to a greater extent by the many assistants working under King and to a lesser extent by King himself.

== Format ==
The hardcover volumes of the series measure 10 inches × 7.5 inches (254 mm × 191 mm). Each volume has a dust jacket and fabric ribbon bookmark. The strips are reproduced in black-and-white, and most often at two strips per page to the amount of around 700 strips (two years of the original run) per volume. The book design is done by Chris Ware. Introductions and biographical pieces are written by Jeet Heer and extra material such as photographs, memorabilia, drawings, sketches, excerpts from Frank King's diary and essays are included. The base for the biographical material of the books have been supplied by Drewanna King, grand-daughter of the creator Frank King, this being: the original letters, diaries, photographs and home movies of the King family. The MSRP per volume was, at the time of volume one's release, set at $29.99 but has over time increased, the latest volume to date (volume eight, released 2019) costing $49.99. The source material for the comic strips reprinted in the volumes are among others mostly sourced from Joe Matt, Chris Ware and the Billy Ireland Cartoon Library & Museum.

Volume one of the series starts off from year 1921, the same time that Skeezix was introduced into the strip. The real beginning of Gasoline Alley, from 1918, is reprinted in the standalone volume Walt before Skeezix which feature the very beginning of the strip from 1918 onwards to when volume one of Walt and Skeezix then takes over. The earliest installments of the strip were single panels, the first proper strip did appear in September 1919. The book series does only collect the daily strips of Gasoline Alley, a decision made due to the editors considering the major marvel of Frank King's genius is to be seen in the daily continuation, the accumulated story of Walt and Skeezix over time while they age.

The Walt before Skeezix book was released in 2014 just after the Walt and Skeezix series had completed the first decade of the comic strip, and was going to receive a redesign prior to continuation into the next decade of strips. The editors of the series thought that it would be a good fit to therefore publish the beginning Gasoline Alley strips prior to the series' design shift.

== Recognition ==
According to The New York Times, the first volume of the series managed to sell over 10,000 copies from its release in June, 2005 to January, 2007. Volumes of the series have been reviewed in The A.V. Club, Geist, Kirkus Reviews, The New Yorker, NPR, PopMatters, Publishers Weekly, Time and The Washington Post.

- 2006
  - Volume 1 of the series was nominated for a Harvey Award in the category "Best Domestic Reprint Project".
  - Volume 1 of the series was nominated for the Eisner Award in the categories "Best Archival Collection/Project - Comic Strips" and "Best Publication Design",
- 2007
  - Volume 2 of the series was nominated for the Eisner Award in the category "Best Archival Collection/Project - Comic Strips".

== Volumes ==
Volumes
Volume	Release date	Title	Period	Page count	ISBN
0	2014-06-10	Walt before Skeezix	1918-1920	540	978-1-77046-141-3
1	2005-06-23	Walt and Skeezix - 1921-1922	1921-1922	352	978-1-89659-764-5
2	2006-08-22	Walt and Skeezix - 1923-1924	1923-1924	400	978-1-89659-799-7
3	2007-10-02	Walt and Skeezix - 1925-1926	1925-1926	400	978-1-89729-909-8
4	2010-04-13	Walt and Skeezix - 1927-1928	1927-1928	400	978-1-89729-939-5
5	2011-12-06	Walt and Skeezix - 1929-1930	1929-1930	400	978-1-77046-031-7
6	2016-02-02	Walt and Skeezix - 1931-1932	1931-1932	400	978-1-77046-178-9
7	2019-04-23	Walt and Skeezix - 1933-1934	1933-1934	352	978-1-77046-346-2
