= Little Joe (comic strip) =

American comic strip (1933–1972)

- Author(s): Ed Leffingwell (1933–1936); Bob Leffingwell (1936–1972)
- Current status/schedule: Concluded Sunday strip
- Launch date: October 1, 1933
- End date: 1972
- Syndicate(s): Chicago Tribune New York News Syndicate
- Publisher(s): Dell Comics
- Genre(s): Western

Little Joe is an American Western comic strip created by Ed Leffingwell and later continued by his brother Robert Leffingwell. Distributed by the Chicago Tribune Syndicate, this Sunday strip had a long run spanning four decades. It was never a daily strip.

Ed Leffingwell began in comics as an assistant to his cousin, Harold Gray, the creator of Little Orphan Annie—which may explain why the artwork and layouts on Little Joe were very similar to Annie's. Little Joe tended toward the highly dramatic, violent and sometimes even grisly. Its stories usually emphasized harsh frontier justice and basic virtues such as honesty, self reliance, and independence with an occasional touch of wry humor.

== History ==
Little Joe began October 1, 1933, but Ed Leffingwell worked on the strip for only three years. When he died suddenly in December, 1936, Bob Leffingwell (also a Gray assistant) stepped in, continuing the strip until its conclusion in 1972. The resemblance to Little Orphan Annie in both style and content diminished in the early 1950s when the format changed from a dramatic adventure strip to a more simply rendered gag strip. It suffered greatly during its last few years routinely involving Joe and a Navajo boy named Dead Pan retelling a tired old joke. Bob Leffingwell continued to ink and letter Little Orphan Annie until Harold Gray's death in 1969 when the feature passed into other hands.

Joe ran in an ever dwindling number of papers until it was caught up in the 1972 syndicate purge of formerly popular strips that included Terry and the Pirates and Smilin' Jack.

Comics historian Don Markstein described the storyline:

Joe Oak was 13 years old, though he looked younger, especially at first. He was an only child and his father had been murdered, leaving him and Mom to run the Oak Ranch by themselves. They were assisted by a white-moustached man named Utah, who had been a gunslinger in his youth. Utah was their foreman and, when times were rough, only employee. He assumed the paternal role when it came to teaching Joe proper behavior for a man, and the survival skills he'd need to become one. Other than that, the strip was populated by outlaws, corrupt businessmen and politicians, Indians both good and bad, and similar staples of the genre. Later on, an old friend of Utah's, a charming rogue known only as "Ze Gen'ral", joined the cast... helping the protagonists out of jams and occasionally (when opportunity permitted) cheating them.

Starting May 16, 1943, Ze Gen'ral became a topper strip above Little Joe. The topper continued until at least the 1960s.

Little Joe was reprinted in Dell Comics' Popular Comics, Super Comics and Dell's Four Color Comics series (1942). In 1935 Whitman published a "Little Joe" "Top Line" edition; a Big Little Book variant. The character of "Utah" appears on the box art of the 1930s Little Orphan Anne Shooting Game. A CD-ROM reprinting early Little Joe strips was released in 2002 and a hardback collection of the 1937-1942 Sunday pages was published in 2020.
