= Little Orphan Annie =

1924–2010 American comic strip

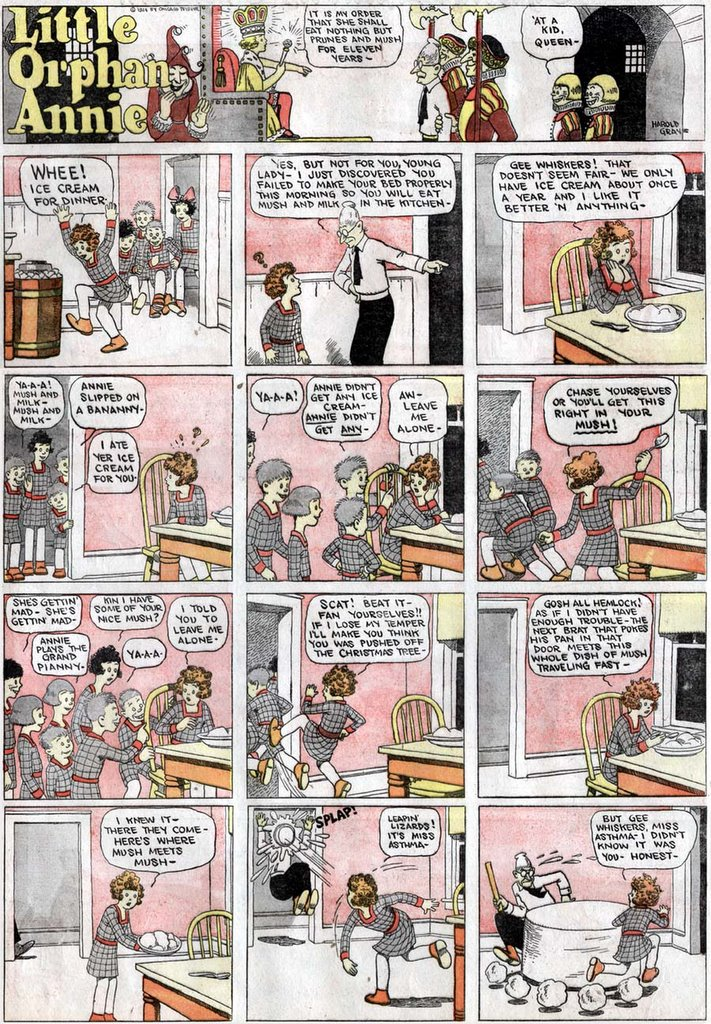
- First Little Orphan Annie Sunday page (November 2, 1924)
- Author: Harold Gray
- Current status/schedule: Ended
- Launch date: August 5, 1924; 102 years ago
- End date: June 13, 2010; 16 years ago
- Syndicate: Tribune Media Services
- Genre(s): Action-adventure, humor

Little Orphan Annie, also simply known as Annie, was a daily American comic strip created by Harold Gray and syndicated by the Tribune Media Services. The strip took its name from the 1885 poem "Little Orphant Annie" by James Whitcomb Riley, and it made its debut on August 5, 1924, in the New York Daily News.

The plot followed the wide-ranging adventures of Annie, her dog Sandy and her benefactor Oliver "Daddy" Warbucks. Secondary characters include Punjab, the Asp and Mr. Am. The strip attracted adult readers with political commentary that targeted (among other things) organized labor, the New Deal and communism.

Following Gray's death in 1968, several artists drew the strip and, for a time, "classic" strips were rerun. Little Orphan Annie inspired a radio show in 1930, film adaptations by RKO in 1932 and Paramount in 1938 and a Broadway musical Annie in 1977 (which was adapted on screen four times, once in 1982, once on TV in 1999, once in 2014, and a live TV production in 2021). The strip's popularity declined over the years; it was running in only 20 newspapers when it ended on June 13, 2010. The characters now appear occasionally as supporting cast in Dick Tracy.

== Story ==
Little Orphan Annie displays literary kinship with the picaresque novel in its seemingly endless string of episodic and unrelated adventures in the life of a character who wanders like an innocent vagabond through a corrupt world. In Annie's first year, the picaresque pattern that characterizes her story is set, with the major players – Annie, Sandy and "Daddy" Warbucks – introduced within the strip's first several weeks.

The story opens in a dreary and Dickensian orphanage where Annie is routinely abused by the cold and sarcastic matron Miss Asthma, who eventually is replaced by the equally mean Miss Treat (whose name is a play on the word "mistreat").

One day, the wealthy but mean-spirited Mrs. Warbucks takes Annie into her home "on trial". She makes it clear that she does not like Annie and tries to send her back to "the Home", but one of her society friends catches her in the act, and immediately, to her disgust, she changes her mind.

Her husband Oliver, who returned from a business trip, instantly develops a paternal affection for Annie and instructs her to address him as "Daddy". Originally, the Warbucks had a dog named One-Lung, who liked Annie. Their household staff also takes to Annie and they like her.

However, the staff despises Mrs. Warbucks, the daughter of a nouveau riche plumber's assistant. Cold-hearted Mrs. Warbucks sends Annie back to "the Home" numerous times, and the staff hates her for that. "Daddy" (Oliver) keeps thinking of her as his daughter. Mrs. Warbucks often argues with Oliver over how much he "mortifies her when company comes" and his affection for Annie. A very status-conscious woman, she feels that Oliver and Annie are ruining her socially. However, Oliver usually is able to put her in her place, especially when she criticizes Annie.

== Story formulas ==
The strip developed a series of formulas that ran over its course to facilitate a wide range of stories. The earlier strips relied on a formula by which Daddy Warbucks is called away on business and through a variety of contrivances, Annie is cast out of the Warbucks mansion, usually by her enemy, the nasty Mrs. Warbucks. Annie then wanders the countryside and has adventures meeting and helping new people in their daily struggles. Early stories dealt with political corruption, criminal gangs and corrupt institutions, which Annie would confront. Annie ultimately would encounter troubles with the villain, who would be vanquished by the returning Daddy Warbucks. Annie and Daddy would then be reunited, at which point, after several weeks, the formula would play out again. In the series, each strip represented a single day in the life of the characters. This device was dropped by the end of the '20s.

By the 1930s, during the Great Depression, the formula was tweaked: Daddy Warbucks lost his fortune due to a corrupt rival and briefly died from despair at the 1944 re-election of Franklin D. Roosevelt. Annie remained an orphan, and for several years had adventures that involved more internationally based enemies. The contemporary events taking place in Europe were reflected in the strips during the 1940s and World War II. Daddy Warbucks was reunited with Annie, as his death was retconned to coma, from which he woke in 1945, coinciding with Roosevelt's real-world death.

By this time, the series enlarged its world with the addition of characters such as Asp and Punjab, bodyguards and servants to Annie and Daddy Warbucks. They traveled the world, with Annie having adventures on her own or with her adopted family.

== Characters ==
Annie is a ten-year-old orphan. Her distinguishing physical characteristics are curly red hair, a red dress and vacant circles for eyes. Her catchphrases are "Gee whiskers" and "Leapin' lizards!" In the comic, Annie attributes her lasting youthfulness to her birthday being on February 29 in a leap year, and ages only one year in appearance for every four years that pass. Annie is a plucky, generous, compassionate, and optimistic youngster who can hold her own against bullies, and has a strong and intuitive sense of right and wrong.

Sandy enters the story in a January 1925 strip as a puppy of no particular breed which Annie rescues from a gang of abusive boys. The girl is working as a drudge in Mrs. Bottle's grocery store at the time and manages to keep the puppy briefly concealed. She finally gives him to Paddy Lynch, a gentle man who owns a "steak joint" and can give Sandy a good home. Sandy is a mature dog when he suddenly reappears in a May 1925 strip to rescue Annie from gypsy kidnappers. Annie and Sandy remain together thereafter.

Oliver "Daddy" Warbucks first appears in a September 1924 strip and reveals a month later he was formerly a small machine shop owner who acquired his enormous wealth producing munitions during World War I. He is a large, powerfully-built bald man, the idealized capitalist, who typically wears a tuxedo and diamond stickpin in his shirtfront. He likes Annie at once, instructing her to call him "Daddy", but his wife (the daughter of a plumber's assistant) is a snobbish, gossiping nouveau riche who derides her husband's affection for Annie. When Warbucks is suddenly called to Siberia on business, his wife spitefully sends Annie back to the orphanage.

Other major characters include Warbucks' right-hand men: Punjab, an eight-foot native of India, introduced in 1935, and the Asp, an inscrutably generalized East Asian, who first appeared in 1937. Also introduced in 1937 was the mysterious Mr. Am, a bearded sage millions of years old, whose supernatural powers include bringing the dead back to life.

== Publication history ==
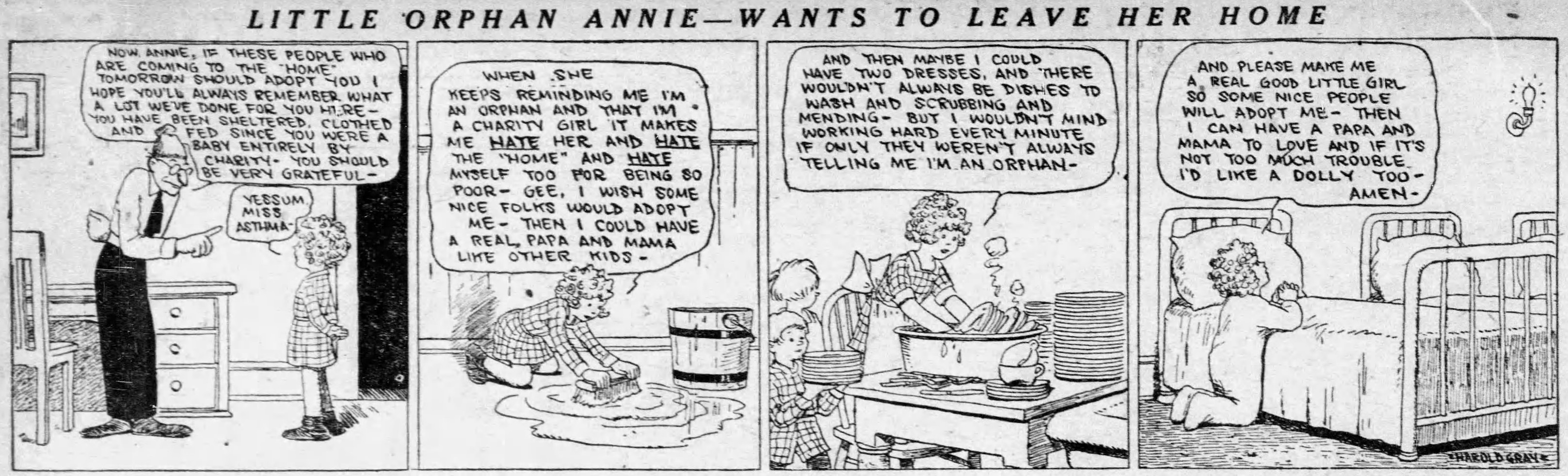
The first strip of Annie's test run, published on August 5, 1924.

After World War I, cartoonist Harold Gray joined the Chicago Tribune which, at that time, was being reworked by owner Joseph Medill Patterson into an important national journal. As part of his plan, Patterson wanted to publish comic strips that would lend themselves to nationwide syndication and to film and radio adaptations. Gray's strips were consistently rejected by Patterson, but Little Orphan Annie was finally accepted and debuted in a test run on August 5, 1924, in the New York Daily News, a Tribune-owned tabloid. Reader response was positive, and Annie began appearing as a Sunday strip in the Tribune on November 2 and as a daily strip on November 10. It was soon offered for syndication and picked up by the Toronto Star and The Atlanta Constitution.

Harold Gray

Gray reported in 1952 that Annie's origin lay in a chance meeting he had with a ragamuffin while wandering the streets of Chicago looking for cartooning ideas. "I talked to this little kid and liked her right away", Gray said. "She had common sense, knew how to take care of herself. She had to. Her name was Annie. At the time some 40 strips were using boys as the main characters; only three were using girls. I chose Annie for mine, and made her an orphan, so she'd have no family, no tangling alliances, but freedom to go where she pleased." By changing the gender of his lead character, Gray differentiated himself in the field of comics (and likely increased his readership by appealing to female readers). In designing the strip, Gray was influenced by his midwestern farm boyhood, Victorian poetry and novels such as Charles Dickens's Great Expectations, Sidney Smith's wildly popular comic strip The Gumps, and the histrionics of the silent films and melodramas of the period. Initially, there was no continuity between the dailies and the Sunday strips, but by the early 1930s the two had become one. The strip (whose title was borrowed from James Whitcomb Riley's 1885 poem "Little Orphant Annie") was "conservative and topical", according to the editors of The Great Depression in America: A Cultural Encyclopedia, and "represents the personal vision" of Gray and Riley's "homespun philosophy of hard work, respect for elders, and a cheerful outlook on life". A Fortune popularity poll in 1937 indicated Little Orphan Annie ranked number one and ahead of Popeye, Dick Tracy, Bringing Up Father, The Gumps, Blondie, Moon Mullins, Joe Palooka, Li'l Abner and Tillie the Toiler.

=== 1929 to World War II ===
Gray was little affected by the stock market crash of 1929. The strip was more popular than ever and brought him a good income, which was only enhanced when the strip became the basis for a radio program in 1930 and two films in 1932 and 1938. Unsurprisingly, Gray was mocked by some for his strip's lecturing to the poor on hard work, initiative, and motivation, while still enjoying his successful lifestyle.

Starting January 4, 1931, Gray added a topper strip to the Little Orphan Annie Sunday page called Private Life Of... The strip chose a common object each week like potatoes, hats and baseballs, and told their "stories". That idea ran for two years, ending on Christmas Day, 1932. A new three-panel gag strip about an elderly lady, Maw Green, began on January 1, 1933, and ran along the bottom of the Sunday page until 1973.

In 1935, Punjab, a gigantic, sword-wielding, beturbaned Indian, was introduced to the strip and became one of its iconic characters. Whereas Annie's adventures up to the point of Punjab's appearance were realistic and believable, her adventures following his introduction touched upon the supernatural, the cosmic, and the fantastic.

In November 1932, Franklin Delano Roosevelt was elected president and proposed his New Deal. Many, including Gray, saw this and other programs as government interference in private enterprise. Gray railed against Roosevelt and his programs. (Gray even seemingly killed Daddy Warbucks off in 1944, but following FDR's death in 1945, Gray brought back Warbucks, who said to Annie, "Somehow I feel that the climate here has changed since I went away", suggesting that Warbucks could not coexist in the world with FDR.) Annie's life was complicated not only by thugs and gangsters but also by New Deal do-gooders and bureaucrats. Organized labor was feared by businessmen and Gray took the businessmen's side. Some writers and editors took issue with this strip's criticisms of FDR's New Deal and 1930s labor unionism. The New Republic described Annie as "Hooverism in the Funnies", arguing that Gray's strip was defending utility company bosses then being investigated by the government. The Herald Dispatch of Huntington, West Virginia, stopped running Little Orphan Annie, printing a front-page editorial rebuking Gray's politics. A subsequent New Republic editorial praised the paper's move, and The Nation likewise voiced its support.

In the late 1920s, the strip had taken on a more adult and adventurous feel with Annie encountering killers, gangsters, spies, and saboteurs. It was about this time that Gray, whose politics seem to have been broadly conservative and libertarian with a decided populist streak, introduced some of his more controversial storylines. He would look into the darker aspects of human nature, such as greed and treachery. The gap between rich and poor was an important theme. His hostility toward labor unions was dramatized in the 1935 story "Eonite". Other targets were the New Deal, communism, and corrupt businessmen.

Gray was especially critical of the justice system, which he saw as not doing enough to deal with criminals. Thus, some of his storylines featured people taking the law into their own hands. This happened as early as 1927 in an adventure named "The Haunted House". Annie is kidnapped by a gangster called Mister Mack. Warbucks rescues her and takes Mack and his gang into custody. He then contacts a local Senator who owes him a favor. Warbucks persuades the politician to use his influence with the judge and make sure that the trial goes their way and that Mack and his men get their just deserts. Annie questions the use of such methods but concludes it is necessary to counteract criminals manipulating the justice system in their own way.

Warbucks became much more ruthless in later years. After catching yet another gang of Annie kidnappers, he announced that he "wouldn't think of troubling the police with you boys", implying that while he and Annie celebrated their reunion, the Asp and his men took the kidnappers away to be lynched. In another Sunday strip, published during World War II, a war-profiteer expresses the hope that the conflict would last another 20 years. An outraged member of the public physically assaults the man for his opinion, claiming revenge for his two sons who have already been killed in the fighting. When a passing policeman is about to intervene, Annie talks him out of it, suggesting, "It's better some times to let folks settle some questions by what you might call democratic processes."

=== World War II and Annie's Junior Commandos ===
As war clouds gathered, both the Chicago Tribune and the New York Daily News advocated neutrality; "Daddy" Warbucks, however, was gleefully manufacturing tanks, planes, and munitions. Journalist James Edward Vlamos deplored the loss of fantasy, innocence, and humor in the "funnies", and took to task one of Gray's sequences about espionage, noting that the "fate of the nation" rested on "Annie's frail shoulders". Vlamos advised readers to "Stick to the saner world of war and horror on the front pages."

When the US entered World War II, Annie not only played her part by blowing up a German submarine but organized and led groups of children called the Junior Commandos in the collection of newspapers, scrap metal, and other recyclable materials for the war effort. Annie herself wore an armband emblazoned with "JC" and called herself "Colonel Annie". In real life, the idea caught on, and schools and parents were encouraged to organize similar groups. Twenty thousand Junior Commandos were reportedly registered in Boston.

Gray was praised far and wide for his war effort brainchild. Editor & Publisher wrote,

Harold Gray, Little Orphan Annie creator, has done one of the biggest jobs to date for the scrap drive. His 'Junior Commando' project, which he inaugurated some months ago, has caught on all around the country, and tons of scrap have been collected and contributed to the campaign. The kids sell the scrap, and the proceeds are turned into stamps and bonds.

Not all was rosy for Gray, however. His application for extra gas coupons was denied by the Office of Price Administration, as cartoonists were not deemed essential to the war effort. Gray appealed, but the decision was upheld. Furious, Gray used the strip to criticize the government's decision as well as the clerk who made the original denial, whom he thinly caricatured in the strip. This storyline was controversial, with both sides garnering criticism in local papers. The clerk eventually threatened to sue for libel, and some papers cancelled the strip. Gray showed no remorse, but did discontinue the sequence.

Gray was criticized by a Southern newspaper for including a black child among the white children in the Junior Commandos. In his reply, Gray denied being a reformer, but pointed out that Annie was a friend to all, and his inclusion of a black character, was "merely a casual gesture toward a very large block of readers." African-American readers wrote letters to Gray thanking him for the incorporation of a black child in the strip, although no record survives of any replies from Gray.

In the summer of 1944, Franklin Delano Roosevelt, whom Gray despised, was nominated for a fourth term as President of the United States. Gray responded with a dramatic month-long storyline that ended with Warbucks dying of a jungle fever. Readers were generally unhappy with Gray's decision to kill off the character, although one New York Man wrote to suggest that Annie also be killed off and the strip ended.

By the following November, Annie was working as a maid in an abusive home. The public begged Gray to have mercy on Annie; instead, he had her framed for her mistress's murder, though she was later exonerated. Following Roosevelt's death in April 1945, Gray resurrected Warbucks with the explanation that he had only been playing dead to thwart his enemies, and once again the billionaire began expounding the joys of capitalism.

=== Post-war years ===
In the post-war years, Annie took on The Bomb, communism, teenage rebellion and a host of other social and political concerns, often provoking the enmity of clergymen, union leaders and others. For example, Gray believed children should be allowed to work. "A little work never hurt any kid," Gray stated, "One of the reasons we have so much juvenile delinquency is that kids are forced by law to loaf around on street corners and get into trouble." His belief brought upon him the wrath of the labor movement, which staunchly supported the child labor laws.

A London newspaper columnist thought some of Gray's sequences a threat to world peace, but a Detroit newspaper supported Gray on his "shoot first, ask questions later" foreign policy. Gray was criticized for the gruesome violence in the strips, particularly a sequence in which Annie and Sandy were run over by a car. Gray responded to the criticism by giving Annie a year-long bout with amnesia that allowed her to trip through several adventures without Daddy. In 1956, a sequence about juvenile delinquency, drug addiction, switchblades, prostitutes, crooked cops, and the ties between teens and adult gangsters unleashed a firestorm of criticism; 30 newspapers cancelled the strip. The syndicate ordered Gray to drop the sequence and develop another adventure.

=== Gray's death ===
Leonard Starr's Little Orphan Annie

Gray died in May 1968 of cancer, and the strip was continued under other cartoonists. Gray's cousin and assistant Robert Leffingwell was the first on the job but proved inadequate and the strip was handed over to Tribune staff artist Henry Arnold and general manager Henry Raduta as the search continued for a permanent replacement. Tex Blaisdell, an experienced comics artist, got the job with Elliot Caplin as writer. Caplin avoided political themes and concentrated instead on character stories. The two worked together six years on the strip, but subscriptions fell off and both left at the end of 1973. The strip was passed to others and during this time complaints were registered regarding Annie's appearance, her conservative politics, and her lack of spunk. Early in 1974, David Lettick took the strip, but his Annie was drawn in an entirely different and more "cartoonish" style, leading to reader complaints, and he left after only three months. In April 1974, the decision was made to reprint Gray's classic strips, beginning in 1936. Subscriptions increased. The reprints ran from April 22, 1974, to December 8, 1979.

Following the success of the Broadway musical Annie, the strip was resurrected on December 9, 1979, as Annie, written and drawn by Leonard Starr. Starr, the creator of Mary Perkins, On Stage, was the only one besides Gray to achieve notable success with the strip.

Starr's last strip ran on February 20, 2000, and the strip went into reprints again for several months. Starr was succeeded by Daily News writer Jay Maeder and artist Margeaux Pepoy (credited as Andrew Pepoy), beginning Monday, June 5, 2000. Pepoy was succeeded by Alan Kupperberg (April 1, 2001 – July 11, 2004) and Ted Slampyak (July 5, 2004 – June 13, 2010). The new creators updated the strip's settings and characters for a modern audience, giving Annie a new hairdo and jeans rather than her trademark dress. However, Maeder's new stories never managed to live up to the pathos and emotional engagement of the stories by Gray and Starr. Annie herself was often reduced to a supporting role, and she was a far less complex character than the girl readers had known for seven decades. Maeder's writing style also tended to make the stories feel like tongue-in-cheek adventures compared to the serious, heartfelt tales Gray and Starr favored. Annie gradually lost subscribers during the 2000s, and, by 2010, it was running in fewer than 20 U.S. newspapers.

=== Cancellation ===
On May 13, 2010, Tribune Media Services announced that the strip's final installment would appear on Sunday, June 13, 2010, ending after 86 years. At the time of the cancellation announcement, it was running in fewer than 20 newspapers, some of which, such as the New York Daily News, had carried the strip for its entire life. The final cartoonist, Ted Slampyak, said, "It's kind of painful. It's almost like mourning the loss of a friend."

The last strip was the culmination of a story arc where Annie was kidnapped from her hotel by a wanted war criminal from eastern Europe who checked in under a phony name with a fake passport. Although Warbucks enlists the help of the FBI and Interpol to find her, by the end of the final strip he has begun to resign himself to the very strong possibility that Annie most likely will not be found alive. Unfortunately, Warbucks is unaware that Annie is still alive and has made her way to Guatemala with her captor, known simply as the "Butcher of the Balkans". Although Annie wants to be let go, the Butcher tells her that he neither will let her go nor kill her—for fear of being captured and because he will not kill a child despite his many political killings—and adds that she has a new life now with him. The final panel of the strip reads "And this is where we leave our Annie. For Now—".

Since the cancellation, rerun strips have been running on the GoComics site.

=== Final resolution: Warbucks calls on Dick Tracy ===
In 2013, the team behind Dick Tracy began a story line that would permanently resolve the fate of Annie. The week of June 10, 2013, featured several Annie characters in extended cameos complete with dialogue, including Warbucks, the Asp and Punjab. On June 16, Warbucks implies that Annie is still missing and that he might even enlist Tracy's help in finding her. Asp and Punjab appeared again on March 26, 2014. The caption says that these events will soon impact on the detective.

The storyline resumed on June 8, 2014, with Warbucks asking for Tracy's assistance in finding Annie. In the course of the story, Tracy receives a letter from Annie and determines her location. Meanwhile, the name of the kidnapper is revealed as Henrik Wilemse, and he has been tracked to the city where he is found and made to disappear. Tracy and Warbucks rescued Annie, and the storyline wrapped up on October 12.

Annie again visited Dick Tracy, visiting his granddaughter Honeymoon Tracy, starting June 6, 2015. This arc concluded September 26, 2015 with Dick Tracy sending the girls home from a crime scene to keep them out of the news.

A third appearance of Annie and her supporting cast in Dick Tracy's strip began on May 16, 2019, and involves both B-B Eyes' murder and doubts about the fate of Trixie. The arc also establishes that Warbucks has formally adopted Annie, as opposed to being just his ward.

== Adaptations ==
=== Radio ===
Little Orphan Annie was adapted to a 15-minute radio show that debuted on WGN Chicago in 1930 and went national on NBC's Blue Network beginning April 6, 1931. The show was one of the first comic strips adapted to radio, attracted about 6 million fans, and left the air in 1942. Radio historian Jim Harmon attributes the show's popularity in The Great Radio Heroes to the fact that it was the only radio show to deal with and appeal to young children.

=== 1930s films based on the comic strip ===
Two film adaptations were released at the height of Annie's popularity in the 1930s. Little Orphan Annie, the first adaptation, was produced by David O. Selznick for RKO in 1932 and starred Mitzi Green as Annie. The plot was simple: Warbucks leaves on business and Annie finds herself in the orphanage again. She pals around with a little boy named Mickey, and when he is adopted by a wealthy woman, she visits him in his new home. Warbucks returns and holds a Christmas party for all. The film opened on Christmas Eve 1932. Variety panned it, and the New York Daily News was "slightly disappointed" with the film, thinking Green too "big and buxom" for the role. Paramount brought Ann Gillis to the role of Annie in their 1938 film adaptation, but this version was panned as well. One reviewer thought it "stupid and thoroughly boresome" and was uncomfortable with the "sugar-coated Pollyanna characterization" given Annie.

Three years after the RKO release, Gray wrote a sequence for the strip that sent Annie to Hollywood. She is hired at low wages to play the stand-in and stunt double for the bratty child star Tootsie McSnoots. Young starlet Janey Spangles tips off Annie to the corrupt practices in Hollywood. Annie handles the information with maturity and has a good time with Janey while doing her job on the set. Annie doesn't become a star. As Bruce Smith remarks in The History of Little Orphan Annie, "Gray was smart enough never to let [Annie] get too successful."

=== Broadway ===
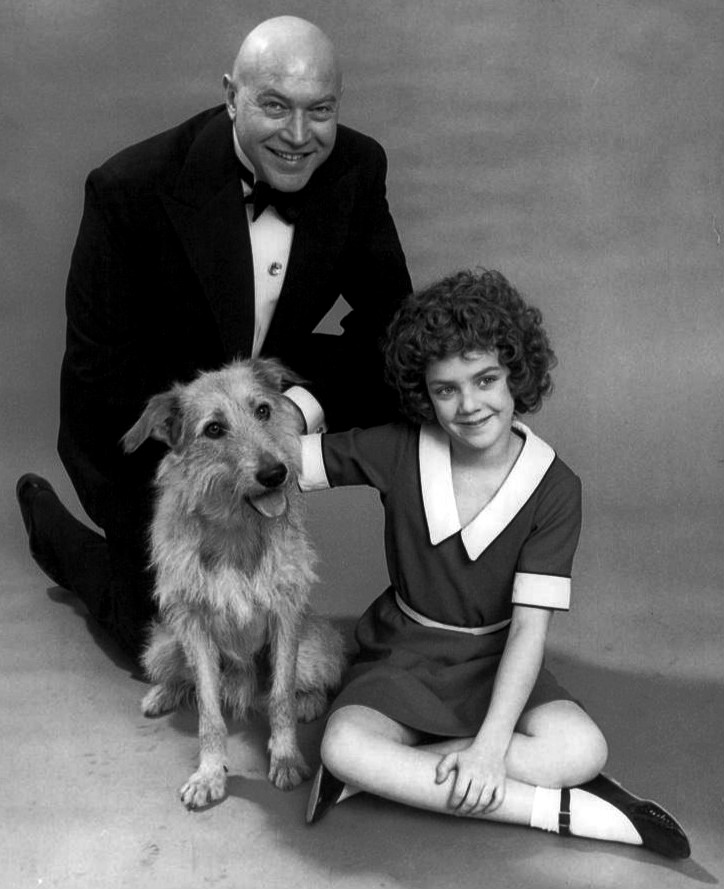
Members of the original Broadway cast for Annie: Andrea McArdle as Annie, Reid Shelton as Daddy Warbucks, and Sandy

In 1977, Little Orphan Annie was adapted to the Broadway stage as Annie. With music by Charles Strouse, lyrics by Martin Charnin and book by Thomas Meehan, the original production ran from April 21, 1977, to January 2, 1983. The work has been staged internationally. The musical took considerable liberties with the original comic strip plot, the least of which being Oliver Warbucks supporting President Franklin D. Roosevelt's agenda.

The Broadway Annies were Andrea McArdle, Shelly Bruce, Sarah Jessica Parker, Allison Smith and Alyson Kirk. Actresses who portrayed Miss Hannigan are Dorothy Loudon, Alice Ghostley, Betty Hutton, Ruth Kobart, Marcia Lewis, June Havoc, Nell Carter and Sally Struthers. Songs from the musical include "Tomorrow" and "It's the Hard Knock Life". There is also a children's version of Annie called Annie Junior. Two sequels to the musical, Annie 2: Miss Hannigan's Revenge (1989) and Annie Warbucks (1992-93), were written by the same creative team; neither show opened on Broadway. There were also many "bus & truck" tours of Little Orphan Annie throughout the United States during the success of the Broadway Shows.

=== Film adaptations of the Broadway musical ===
In addition to the two Annie films of the 1930s, there have been three film adaptations of the Broadway play. All have the same title. They are Annie (1982), Annie (1999, a made-for-television adaptation) and Annie (2014).

The 1982 version was directed by John Huston and starred Aileen Quinn as Annie, Albert Finney as Warbucks, Ann Reinking as his secretary Grace Farrell, and Carol Burnett as Miss Hannigan. The film departed from the Broadway production in several respects, most notably changing the climax of the story from Christmas to the Fourth of July. It also featured five new songs, "Dumb Dog", "Sandy", "Let's Go to the Movies", "Sign", and "We Got Annie", while cutting "We'd like to Thank You, Herbert Hoover", "N.Y.C", "You Won't Be an Orphan for Long", "Something Was Missing", "Annie", and "New Deal for Christmas". It received mixed critical reviews and, while becoming the 10th highest-grossing film of 1982, barely recouped its $50 million budget.

A direct-to-video film, Annie: A Royal Adventure! was released in 1996 as a sequel to the 1982 film. It features Ashley Johnson as Annie and focuses on the adventures of Annie and her friends Hannah and Molly. It is set in England in 1943, about 10 years after the first film, when Annie and her friends Hannah and Molly sail to England after Daddy Warbucks is invited to receive a knighthood. None of the original 1982 cast appear and the film features no musical numbers apart from a reprise of "Tomorrow".

The animated Little Orphan Annie's A Very Animated Christmas was produced as a direct-to-video film in 1995.

The 1999 television film was produced for The Wonderful World of Disney. It starred Victor Garber, Alan Cumming, Audra McDonald and Kristin Chenoweth, with Oscar winner Kathy Bates as Miss Hannigan and newcomer Alicia Morton as Annie. While its plot stuck closer to the original Broadway production, it also omitted "We'd Like to Thank You, Herbert Hoover", "Annie", "New Deal for Christmas", and a reprise of "Tomorrow." Generally favorably received, the production earned two Emmy Awards and George Foster Peabody Award.

The 2014 film Annie was produced by Jay-Z and Will Smith. It starred Quvenzhané Wallis in the title role and Jamie Foxx in the role of Will Stacks (a role similar to Warbucks). The film follows the basic plot of the musical but is set in the present day and features new songs along re-mixed versions of older ones. It was released on December 19, 2014.

== Parodies, imitations and cultural citations ==
The characters and concept of Little Orphan Annie have been influential in comics and other media during the original run and continuing into the modern day. Between 1936 and October 17, 1959, the comic strip Belinda Blue-Eyes (later shortened to Belinda) ran in the United Kingdom in the Daily Mirror. Writers Bill Connor and Don Freeman and artists Stephen Dowling and Tony Royle all worked on the strip over the years. In The Penguin Book of Comics Belinda is described as "a perpetual waif, a British counterpart to the transatlantic Little Orphan Annie." The strip also influenced Little Annie Rooney (Jan. 10, 1927–1966) and Frankie Doodle (1934-1938).

In 1995, Little Orphan Annie was one of 20 American comic strips included in the Comic Strip Classics series of commemorative U.S. postage stamps. Rapper Jay-Z has referenced Little Orphan Annie in at least two of his songs, as well as sampling "It's the Hard Knock Life" for "Hard Knock Life (Ghetto Anthem)" (1998). On the album cover of punk rock cover band Me First and the Gimme Gimmes' 1999 album Are a Drag, rhythm guitarist and Lagwagon vocalist Joey Cape is dressed as Annie, as she was depicted in the 1982 film. Starting in 2014, red-haired comedian Michelle Wolf appeared on numerous segments on Late Night as her fictional persona, "Grown-Up Annie", an adult version of Little Orphan Annie.

In medicine, "Orphan Annie eye" (empty or "ground glass") nuclei are a characteristic histological finding in papillary carcinoma of the thyroid gland.

Many comics, cartoons, TV shows and other media have parodied or referenced the name Little Orphan Annie. Early examples "Little Arf 'n Nonnie" and "Lulu Arfin' Nanny" appear in the Walt Kelly strip Pogo. "Little Orphan Melvin" appears in the ninth issue of Mad magazine by Harvey Kurtzman and Wally Wood, published 1952. Kurtzman later produced a long-running erotic comic for Playboy called Little Annie Fanny. In The Fabulous Furry Freak Brothers, Gilbert Shelton satirized the strip as "Little Orphan Amphetamine". 1980s children's program You Can't Do That on Television parodied the character as "Little Orphan Andrea" in its "Adoption" episode, later banned. The Teenage Mutant Ninja Turtles comics by Mirage Studios feature a fictional toy line named "Little Orphan Aliens".

== Archives ==
Harold Gray's work is in the Howard Gotlieb Archival Research Center at Boston University. The Gray collection includes artwork, printed material, correspondence, manuscripts and photographs. Gray's original pen and ink drawings for Little Orphan Annie daily strips date from 1924 to 1968. The Sunday strips date from 1924 to 1964. Printed material in the collection includes numerous proofs of Little Orphan Annie daily and Sunday strips (1925–68). Most of these are in bound volumes. There are proofsheets of Little Orphan Annie daily strips from the Chicago Tribune-New York Times Syndicate, Inc. for the dates 1943, 1959–61 and 1965–68, as well as originals and photocopies of the printed versions of Little Orphan Annie, both daily and Sunday strips.

== Episode guide ==
- 1924: From Rags to Riches (and Back Again); Just a Couple of Hurried Bites
- 1925: The Silos; Count De Tour
- 1926: School of Hard Knocks; Under the Big Top; Will Tomorrow Never Come?
- 1927: The Blue Bell of Happiness; Haunted House; Other People's Troubles
- 1928: Sherlock Jr.; Mush and Milk; Just Before the Dawn
- 1929: Farm Relief; Girl Next Door; One Blunder After Another
- 1930: Seven Year Itch; The Frame, the Farm & the Flood; Shipwrecked
- 1931: Busted!; Good Neighbor Policy; Down, But Not Out; And a Blind Man Shall Lead Them; Distant Relations; A Hundred to One
- 1932: Don't Mess with Cupid; They Call Her Big Mama; A House Divided; Cosmic City
- 1933: Pinching Pennies; Retribution; Who'd Chizzle a Blind Man?
- 1934: Bleek House; Phil O. Blustered; The One-Way Road to Justice; Dust Yourself Off
- 1935: Punjab the Wizard; Beware the Hate Mongers; Annie in Hollywood
- 1936: Inkey; On the Lam; The Sole of the Matter; The Gila Story; Those Who are About to Die
- 1937: The Million-Dollar Voice; The Omnipotent Mr. Am; Into the Fourth Dimension; Easy Money
- 1938: A Rose, per Chance; The Last Port of Call; Men in Black
- 1939: At Home on the Range; Assault on the Hacienda; Three Face East; Justice at Play
- 1940: In the Nick of Time; Billy the Kid; Peg O' their Hearts
- 1941: The Happy Warrior; Saints and Cynics; Never Trouble Trouble; On Needles and Pins
- 1942: The Junior Commandos; Out on a Limb
- 1943: The Rat Trap, Next Stop—Gooneyville
- 1944: In a Den of Thieves, Death be Thy Name, Mrs. Bleating-Heart
- 1950: Ivan the Terrible, The Town Called Fiasco, Circumstantial Evidence
- 1951: Open Season for Trouble, Something to Remember
- 1952: Here Today, Gone Tomorrow, Dead Men's Point, When You Do That Hoodoo, A Town Called Futility

== Reprints ==
- Between 1926 and 1934, Cupples & Leon published nine collections of Annie strips:
1. Little Orphan Annie (1925 strips, reprinted by Dover and Pacific Comics Club)
2. In the Circus (1926 strips, reprinted by Pacific Comics Club)
3. Haunted House (1927 strips, reprinted by Pacific Comics Club)
4. Bucking the World (1928 strips, reprinted by Pacific Comics Club and in Nemo # 8)
5. Never Say Die (1929 strips, reprinted by Pacific Comics Club)
6. Shipwrecked (1930 strips, reprinted by Pacific Comics Club)
7. A Willing Helper (1931 strips, reprinted by Pacific Comics Club)
8. In Cosmic City (1932 strips, reprinted by Dover)
9. Uncle Dan (1933 strips, reprinted by Pacific Comics Club)
- Arf: The Life and Hard Times of Little Orphan Annie (1970): reprints approximately half the daily strips from 1935 to 1945. However, many of the storylines are edited and shortened, with gaps of several months between some strips.
- Dover Publications reprinted two of the Cupples & Leon books and an original collection Little Orphan Annie in the Great Depression which contains all the daily strips from January to September, 1931.
- Pacific Comics Club has reprinted eight of the Cupples & Leon books. They have also published a new series of reprints, with complete runs of daily strip, in the same format at the C&L books, covering some of the daily strips from 1925 to 29:
1. The Sentence, 1925 strips
2. The Dreamer, strips from January 22, 1926, to April 30, 1926
3. Daddy, strips from September 6, 1926, to December 4, 1926.
4. The Hobo, strips from December 6, 1926, to March 5, 1927.
5. Rich Man, Poor Man, strips from March 7, 1927, to May 7, 1927.
6. The Little Worker, strips from October 8, 1927, to December 21, 1927.
7. The Business of Giving, strips from November 23, 1928, to March 2, 1929.
8. This Surprising World, strips from March 4, 1929, to June 11, 1929.
9. The Pro and the Con, strips from June 12, 1929, to September 19, 1929.
10. The Man of Mystery, strips from September 20, 1929, to December 31, 1929.

Considering both Cupples & Leon and Pacific Comics Club, the biggest gap is in 1928.

- All of the daily and Sunday strips from 1931 to 1935 were reprinted by Fantagraphics in the 1990s, in five volumes, each covering a year, from 1931 to 1935.
- Picking up where Fantagraphics left off, Comics Revue magazine reprinted both daily and Sunday strips from 1936 to 1941, starting in Comics Revue #167 and ending in #288.
- Pacific Comics Club reprinted approximately the first six months of the strips from Comics Revue, under the title Home at Last, December 29, 1935, to April 5, 1936.
- Dragon Lady Press reprinted daily and Sunday strips from September 3, 1945, to February 9, 1946.

In 2008, IDW Publishing started a reprint series, The Complete Little Orphan Annie, under its The Library of American Comics imprint. The series was discontinued after 16 volumes, having reached storylines from 1953.

== See also ==
- Punky Brewster, a television series, about an abandoned girl with her foster dad, and the friends she meets. Also had a spin-off cartoon series.
