= The Complete Terry and the Pirates =

Book series by Milton Caniff

Publication information
- Publisher: The Library of American Comics
- Format: Hardcover
- Genre: Adventure; Drama
- Publication date: September 2007 – March 2009
- No. of issues: 6
- Main character(s): Terry Lee, Pat Ryan, Connie, Big Stoop, The Dragon Lady, Burma, Normandie Drake, Raven Sherman, April Kane, Flip Corkin, Taffy Tucker, Hotshot Charlie

Creative team
- Written by: Milton Caniff
- Artist: Milton Caniff
- Editor: Dean Mullaney

The Complete Terry and The Pirates is a collection of the American comic strip, Terry and the Pirates. The strip was authored by Milton Caniff and originally appeared in newspapers between 1934 and 1946 by the Chicago Tribune Syndicate with over 31 million readers. The collection comprises six hardcover volumes and was published by The Library of American Comics between 2007 and 2009. The series' first volume won the 2008 Eisner Award in the category Best Archival Collection - Project - Comic strips.

== Format ==
The volumes measure 11 × 8.5 inches, (278 mm × 216 mm). The Sunday pages are reproduced in full color alongside the daily strips in black-and-white. The material was sourced from Dean Mullaney's private collection with supplemental pages from Cartoon Research Library at Ohio State University. Three black-and-white daily strips appear on each page. Each Sunday strip appears on a separate page. Introductions were written by Pete Hamill, Howard Chaykin and Bruce Canwell, putting the strip and its plotlines in historical context. Background on the strip's characters, an overview of the cast, as well as an index are included. Each book has about 360 pages and comes with a dust jacket.

Since The Complete Terry and the Pirates would be The Library of American Comics' publishing debut, there were pre-launch questions about if the project would be completed as a whole or cancelled before completion. Dean Mullaney, the publisher and editor of the series had however already taken this risk in account, therefore all six volumes of the series were produced all in one go and in advance to the series' debut, so that LOAC later would be able to publish the whole series whatever response it would receive from buyers when the volumes were consecutively released.

== Volumes ==
Volumes
Volume	Release date	Title	Period	Page count	ISBN
1	2007-09-04	“The Complete Terry and the Pirates - Vol. 1”	1934–1936	368	978-1-60010-100-7
2	2008-02-05	“The Complete Terry and the Pirates - Vol. 2”	1937–1938	352	978-1-60010-142-7
3	2008-05-06	“The Complete Terry and the Pirates - Vol. 3”	1939–1940	352	978-1-60010-144-1
4	2008-10-07	“The Complete Terry and the Pirates - Vol. 4”	1941–1942	352	978-1-60010-195-3
5	2008-12-16	“The Complete Terry and the Pirates - Vol. 5”	1943–1944	352	978-1-60010-247-9
6	2009-03-03	“The Complete Terry and the Pirates - Vol. 6”	1945–1946	352	978-1-60010-348-3

== Terry and the Pirates: The Master Collection ==
The Complete Terry and the Pirates

Publication information
- Publisher: The Library of American Comics
- Schedule: 3-4 per year
- Format: Hardcover
- Genre: Adventure; Drama
- Publication date: August 2022
- No. of issues: 13 planned
- Main character(s): Terry Lee, Pat Ryan, Connie, Big Stoop, The Dragon Lady, Burma, Normandie Drake, Raven Sherman, April Kane, Flip Corkin, Taffy Tucker, Hotshot Charlie

Creative team
- Written by: Milton Caniff
- Artist: Milton Caniff
- Editor(s): Dean Mullaney, Bruce Canwell

After LoAC ended their former publishing agreement with IDW Publishing to switch publishing companion to Clover Press, their first new reprint series to be announced was a new enhanced and reformatted version of their "original" reprint project The Complete Terry and the Pirates, and now with the title Terry and the Pirates: The Master Collection.

== Format ==
The hardcover volumes of the Master Collection are published in portrait orientation, each measuring 11 by 14 inches (approximately 368 by 286 millimeter). They contain one full color Sunday strip per page and three black-and-white daily strips per page.

== Volumes ==
Volumes
Volume	Release date	Title	Period	Page count	ISBN
1	2022-08-09	“Terry and the Pirates: The Master Collection; Vol. 1 - 1934-1935 - Enter the Dragon Lady”	1934–1935	192	978-1-95103-853-3
2	2022-11-29	“Terry and the Pirates: The Master Collection; Vol. 2 - 1936 - The Burma Blues”	1936	164	978-1-95103-845-8
3	2022-11-29	“Terry and the Pirates: The Master Collection; Vol. 3 - 1937 - The Return of Normandie Drake”	1937	164	978-1-95103-859-5
4	2023-05-16	“Terry and the Pirates: The Master Collection; Vol. 4 - 1938 - Pirate Queen and Patriot”	1938	164	978-1-95103-864-9
5	2023-07-01	“Terry and the Pirates: The Master Collection; Vol. 5 - 1939 - The Hypnotic April Kane”	1939	164	978-1-95103-865-6
6	2023-10-01	“Terry and the Pirates: The Master Collection; Vol. 6 - 1940 - The Time of Cholera”	1940	164	978-1-95103-866-3
13	2022-08-09	“Terry and the Pirates: The Master Collection; Odyssey on the China Seas” (Volume containing extras and essays)	N/A	?	978-1-95103-853-3
