= Brian Bruya =

American philosopher and author (born 1966)

- Born: December 22, 1966 (age 59) Spokane, WA
- Pseudonyms: 柏嘯虎, 柏啸虎
- Notable works: Ziran, Effortless Attention, The Philosophical Challenge from China
- Collaborators: Monika Ardelt, Yiyuan Tang
- Relatives: Craig Bruya (brother), Denise Fong (sister)

Brian Bruya (born 22 December 1966) is a professor of philosophy at Eastern Michigan University, and an author of books and articles in the fields of comparative philosophy, cognitive science, and educational psychology. Bruya is known for his work in the study of "effortless attention", and showing that it is possible to foster wisdom in a formal educational setting. He is also a translator and has published translations of a number of popular comic books on Chinese philosophy, which have been featured in The New York Times.

== Education ==
Bruya earned a B. A. (Philosophy; Chinese Language & Literature) from the University of Washington in 1992. He went on to the University of Hawaiʻi at Mānoa, earning an M. A. (Philosophy) in 1999 and Ph.D. (Philosophy) in 2004.

== Scholarship ==
=== Effortless Attention ===
Bruya discovered that although the topic of effortless attention had been a topic of research in behavioral psychology for several decades, it had been neglected in the fields of cognitive psychology and neuroscience. Bruya attributed that neglect to the dominant attention paradigm introduced by Daniel Kahneman in his 1972 book Attention and Effort, in which Kahneman equates attention with effort, thereby precluding the theoretic possibility of effortless attention. Bruya's book Effortless Attention was the first attempt to apply the methods of cognitive neuroscience to the topic of effortless attention. That work has since been followed up by a number of research programs, including Corinna Peifer and Stefan Engeser's Advances in Flow Research. The term "effortless attention" was subsequently introduced into the American Psychological Association's Dictionary of Psychology. Bruya and Yi-Yuan Tang's 2018 article "Is Attention Really Effort?" marshals empirical evidence to refute Kahneman's position.

=== Wisdom ===
Bruya and sociologist Monika Ardelt surmised that wisdom could be treated as a character strength (which is open to short-term modification) rather than the usual way of treating it as a personality trait (which is not open to short-term modification). Using Ardelt's 3-D Wisdom scale, Bruya and Ardelt measured students' wisdom at the beginning and end of the semester, and found that student wisdom could be made to increase over the course of a semester. This was the first time that scientists had demonstrated that wisdom could be taught in a formal education setting.

=== Ziran 自然 ===
Bruya says that his theory of effortless attention derives from his research in early Chinese, especially Daoist, theories of spontaneous (self-caused) human action. He posits that whereas traditional European theories of action separate the human being from nature, early Chinese theories view the human being as fundamentally natural. Noticing that in European theories the Latin term sponte (and its European language derivatives) sometimes harbors mutually contradictory meanings (spontaneous as free and spontaneous as determined), he coined the term "paradox of spontaneity" to describe the philosophical problem, and noted that European philosophers consistently appealed to the concept of God to resolve the paradox. Bruya suggests that the Chinese tradition avoided the paradox by never drawing the free vs. determined distinction and were able to theorize human spontaneity without reference to God. Bruya has applied the Chinese idea of spontaneous (self-caused) human action to philosophy of action, cognitive neuroscience, and aesthetics (especially with respect to a theory of improvisation).

=== Academic Philosophy ===
Bruya is an outspoken critic of the lack of Asian philosophy in American Philosophy Ph.D. programs. In a series of articles, he claims both structural problems and problems that could stem from ethnocentrism prevent Ph.D. programs from integrating Asian philosophical traditions into existing programs.

== Translation ==
Bruya is the translator of C. C Tsai's critically acclaimed comic book adaptations of Chinese philosophical classics, such as the Zhuangzi, the Dao De Jing, the Analects of Confucius, and Sunzi's Art of War. In addition to academic articles on art history and philosophy, he also translated (with co-translator Ma Aiju 马爱菊) Zhao Pu's 赵普 Simple Treasures 掇珍集, a collection of personal essays on uses of traditional art in China today.

== Works ==
=== Books ===
- Effortless Attention: A New Perspective in the Cognitive Science of Attention and Action, edited, 2010
- The Philosophical Challenge from China, edited, 2015
- New Life for Old Ideas: Chinese Philosophy in the Contemporary World, co-edited with Yanming An, 2019
- Ziran: The Philosophy of Spontaneous Self-Causation, 2022
- 自然与智慧——中国古代思想对现代科学与教育的启示 [Nature and Wisdom: Insights from Ancient Chinese Thought for Modern Science and Education], translated by Aiju Ma and Da Ye, 2022

=== Journal Articles ===
- Qing (情) and Emotion in Early Chinese Thought, 2001
- Emotion, Desire, and Numismatic Experience in René Descartes, Zhu Xi, and Wang Yangming, 2001
- Strawson and Prasad on Determinism and Resentment, 2001
- Chaos as the Inchoate: The Early Chinese Aesthetic of Spontaneity, 2002
- Li Zehou's Aesthetics as a Marxist Philosophy of Freedom, 2003
- Schools that Flow," co-authored with Russell Olwell, 2006
- The Rehabilitation of Spontaneity: A New Approach in Philosophy of Action, 2010
- 无为'的认知科学研究 [Cognitive Science of Wu Wei]," translated by Jing Hu, 2011
- What is Self-Consciousness? 2012
- The Tacit Rejection of Multiculturalism in American Philosophy Ph.D. Programs: The Case of Chinese Philosophy, 2015
- Appearance and Reality in the Philosophical Gourmet Report: Why the Discrepancy Matters to the Profession of Philosophy, 2015
- Mechanisms of Mind-Body Interaction and Optimal Performance, co-authored with Yi-Yuan Tang, 2017
- Ethnocentrism and Multiculturalism in Contemporary Philosophy, 2017
- Wisdom Can Be Taught: A Proof-of-Concept Study for Fostering Wisdom in the Classroom, co-authored with Monika Ardelt, 2018
- Is Attention Really Effort? Revisiting Daniel Kahneman's Influential 1973 Book Attention and Effort, co-authored with Yi-Yuan Tang, 2018
- Fostering Wisdom in the Classroom – Part: 1: A General Theory of Wisdom Pedagogy, co-authored with Monika Ardelt, 2018
- Fostering Wisdom in the Classroom – Part 2: A Curriculum, co-authored with Monika Ardelt, 2018
- Three-Dimensional Wisdom and Perceived Stress among College Students," co-authored with Monika Ardelt, 2021
- Fluid Attention in Education: Conceptual and Neurobiological Framework," co-authored with Yi-Yuan Tang, 2021
- Political Intimacy and Self-Governance in the Dialogues of Confucius: An Exploratory Study on the Philosophical Potential of the Kongzi Jia Yu 孔子家語, 2024

=== Book Chapters ===
- Qing (情) and Emotion in Early Chinese Thought, reprint, 2003
- Education and Responsiveness: On the Agency of Intersubjectivity, 2008
- Introduction: Toward a Theory of Attention that Includes Effortless Attention, 2010
- Apertures, Draw, and Syntax: Remodeling Attention, 2010
- Chaos as the Inchoate: The Early Chinese Aesthetic of Spontaneity, reprint, 2011
- Action Without Agency and Natural Human Action: Resolving a Double Paradox, 2015
- To Render Ren: Saving Authoritativeness, 2021

== Translations ==
=== Book ===
- Zhao, Pu. Simple Treasures, co-translated with Aiju Ma, 2019

=== Journal Articles ===
- Teng, Shu-ping, From Severance to Linkage: Communicating with Heaven in Prehistoric China, 1991
- Chi, Jo-hsin, An Examination of Molded Gourd Ware from the Ch'ing Imperial Palace, 1991
- Tang, Yijie. Emotion in Pre-Qin Ruist Moral Theory: An Explanation of 'Dao Begins in Qing,' co-translated with Hai-ming Wen, 2003, reprinted 2015

=== Comic Books ===
- Tsai Chih-chung, Zhuangzi Speaks: The Music of Nature, 1992
- Tsai Chih-chung, Zen Speaks: Shouts of Nothingness, 1994
- Tsai Chih-chung, Sunzi Speaks: The Art of War, 1994
- Tsai Chih-chung, The Tao Speaks: Lao-tzu's Whispers of Wisdom, 1995
- Tsai Chih-chung, Confucius Speaks: Words to Live By, 1996
- Tsai Chih-chung, The Dao of Zhuangzi, 1997
- C. C. Tsai, Confucius, The Analects: An Illustrated Edition, 2018
- C. C. Tsai, Sunzi, The Art of War, 2018
- C. C. Tsai, Zhuangzi, The Way of Nature, 2019
- C. C. Tsai, Laozi, The Dao De Jing, 2020
- C. C. Tsai, The Ways of Zen, 2021

== Honors and awards ==
- Templeton Senior Fellow in Positive Psychology, University of Pennsylvania, 2005
- Tang Junyi Visiting Scholar, University of Michigan, 2010
- Fulbright Scholar, National Taiwan University, 2012-13
- Visiting Scholar, Collaborative Innovation Center of Confucian Civilization, Shandong University, 2018-2019
- Fulbright Scholar, National Taiwan University, 2019-2020
