= The Library of American Comics =

Comic strip publishing imprint

- Parent company: Currently: 2021–present Clover Press; Previously: 2007–2021; IDW Publishing
- Status: Active
- Founded: 2007
- Founder: Dean Mullaney; Bruce Canwell
- Country of origin: United States
- Headquarters location: San Diego, California
- Distribution: Diamond Book Distributors; Penguin Random House
- Key people: Dean Mullaney (Creative Director); Lorraine Turner (Art Director); Bruce Canwell (Associate Director); Kurtis Findlay (Online Communications Coordinator)
- Publication types: Books
- Fiction genres: American comic strips
- Imprints: EuroComics
- Official website: libraryofamericancomics.com

Library of American Comics (abbreviated as LoAC) is an American publisher of classic American comic strips collections and comic history books, founded by Dean Mullaney and Bruce Canwell in 2007.

== History ==
=== Background ===
Dean Mullaney, the founder of the Library of American Comics, developed his interest for comics in his early youth and by the 1970s he was a so-called letterhack, regularly sending in letters of comment to the Marvel comic books' letter pages. His career in comics began in 1977 when he, together with his brother Jan Mullaney as well as Don McGregor and Paul Gulacy, launched the publishing company Eclipse Comics, famous for publishing the graphic novel Sabre. After some time at Eclipse Comics, Mullaney left the comics industry.

In 2006, Mullaney was thinking about making a return to comics, and he found an online article about Sabre written by Bruce Canwell, a former DC Comics and Marvel Comics employee. The article mentioned that Canwell remembered Mullaney as a once frequent letter writer to the Marvel comic books' reader pages which he read growing up, just as Canwell himself was. Mullaney contacted Canwell, and after discussing their future plans, they realized that their visions and ideas were aligned. They discussed going into business together, with the initial goal of bringing a complete hardcover collection of Milton Caniff's comic strip Terry and the Pirates to the public.

Mullaney and Canwell launched the Library of American Comics in summer 2007, beginning publication of a definitive collection The Complete Terry and the Pirates.

=== Findlay joins ===
While writing as an animation blogger, Kurtis Findlay discovered a comic strip he had never heard of: "Crawford", created by the famous animator Chuck Jones. When Findlay checked the copyright status of the strip, he was connected by a worker of Tribune Media Services to Dean Mullaney of LoAC. When Findlay approached LoAC with the proposal of publishing a book about the strip, he learned that Mullaney was a fan of Chuck Jones' works; Mullaney was enthusiastic about Findlay's book idea, and Chuck Jones: The Dream That Never Was was eventually published by LoAC in December 2011.

Since then, Findlay has become the company's Online Communications Coordinator as well as editor for the For Better or For Worse collection published by LoAC.

=== New partnership ===
From 2022, LoAC and EuroComics switched publisher to Clover Press. An agreement was made with IDW Publishing to continue publishing the remaining volumes of For Better or For Worse, which ended with the release of the ninth and final volume in November 2024.

The first, and so far only, LoAC title to be published through the Clover Press partnership was the enhanced reprint series Terry and the Pirates: The Master Collection which started in early 2022.

== Company organization ==
LoAC create their output of books independently from their partner company Clover Press (previously IDW Publishing), but they share distribution network, printing facilities, and logistics with the partner company.

The team at LoAC is editorially fully responsible for book design, selection of content, essays, and production. Most research, compilation of supplemental material and feature texts, and original writing for the company's biographical books are done in-house, although occasionally there is also some freelance material.

=== Key people ===
- Dean Mullaney, Creative Director, founder and editor
- Bruce Canwell, associate director, co-founder and editor
- Lorraine Turner, Art Director
- Kurtis Findlay, Online Communications Coordinator, editor

== Publications ==
The goal of all Library of American Comics collections was to preserve classic American newspaper comics in definitive archival editions. Each framed a comic-strip series with informative essays to provide historical context, both in relation to other comic strips and to the historical events of their time. Unfortunately, however, LoAC discontinued publishing most of the titles long before being complete.

=== Format ===
All the books The Library of American Comics published were hardcover, with sewn binding; the majority also came with a dust jacket and sewn linen bookmark. Book size and reproduction color depended on each series.

== Recognition ==
=== Nominations ===
Eisner Award nominations

- 2012
  - "Best Archival Collection/Project—Strips" – Flash Gordon & Jungle Jim, Vol. 1
  - "Best Archival Collection/Project—Strips" – Tarpe Mills' Miss Fury – Sensational Sundays 1944-1949
  - "Best Comics-Related Book" – Caniff: A Visual Biography
  - "Best Comics-Related Book" – Genius Isolated: The Life and Art of Alex Toth
  - "Best Publication Design" – Genius Isolated: The Life and Art of Alex Toth
- 2013
  - "Best Archival Collection/Project—Strips" – Flash Gordon & Jungle Jim, Vol. 2
  - "Best Archival Collection/Project—Strips" – Percy Crosby's Skippy Daily Comics, Vol. 1
- 2014 – "Best Archival Collection/Project—Strips" – Percy Crosby's Skippy Daily Comics, Vol. 2
- 2015 – "Best Comics-Related Book" – What Fools These Mortals Be: The Story of Puck
- 2016
  - "Best Archival Collection/Project – Strips" – Beyond Mars by Jack Williamson and Lee Elias
  - "Best Comics-Related Book" – King of the Comics: One Hundred Years of King Features Syndicate
  - "Best Publication Design" – King of the Comics: One Hundred Years of King Features Syndicate
- 2018 – "Best Archival Collection/Project – Strips – Star Wars: The Complete Classic Newspaper Comics Vol. 1

Harvey Award nominations

- 2008 – "Best Domestic Reprint Project" – The Complete Terry and the Pirates
- 2009
  - "Best Biographical, Historical or Journalistic Presentation" – Scorchy Smith and the Art of Noel Sickles
  - "Best Domestic Reprint Project" – The Complete Terry and the Pirates
  - "Best Domestic Reprint Project" – Scorchy Smith and the Art of Noel Sickles
- 2010 – "Best Domestic Reprint Project" – Rip Kirby
- 2011 – "Best Domestic Reprint Project" – Li'l Abner: The Complete Dailies & Color Sundays
- 2012 – "Best Domestic Reprint Project" – Flash Gordon & Jungle Jim

=== Awards ===
Eisner Awards

- 2008 – "Best Archival Collection/Project—Strips" – The Complete Terry and the Pirates – Vol. 1
- 2010 – "Best Archival Collection/Project—Strips" – Bloom County: The Complete Library – Vol. 1
- 2011 – "Best Archival Collection/Project—Strips" – Archie Dailies Vol. 1
- 2014 – "Best Archival Collection/Project—Strips" – Tarzan: The Complete Russ Manning Newspaper Strips Vol. 1
- 2014 – "Best comics related book" – Genius, Illustrated: The Life and Art of Alex Toth
- 2014 – "Best publication design" – Genius, Illustrated: The Life and Art of Alex Toth
- 2015 – "Best comics related book" – Genius, Animated: The Cartoon Art of Alex Toth
- 2019 – "Best Archival Collection/Project—Strips" – Star Wars: The Complete Classic Newspaper Comics – Vol. 3

Harvey Awards

- 2012 – "Best biographical, historical or journalistic presentation" – Genius, Isolated: The Life and Art of Alex Toth

== Imprints ==
=== Recognition ===
==== Harvey Award ====
Nominations

- 2015 — "Best American Edition of Foreign Material" — Corto Maltese: Under the Sign of the Capricon by Hugo Pratt
- 2016 — "Best American Edition of Foreign Material" — Corto Maltese: Beyond the Windy Isles by Hugo Pratt
- 2018 — "Best European Book" — Flight of the Raven by Jean-Pierre Gibrat
- 2019 — "Best European Book" — Corto Maltese by Hugo Pratt

==== Eisner Award ====
Nominations

- 2015 - "Best U.S. Edition of International Material" - Corto Maltese: Under the Sign of the Capricon, Hugo Pratt
- 2018
  - "Best U.S. Edition of International Material" - Flight of the Raven by Jean-Paul Gibrat
  - "Best Painter/Multimedia Artist (interior art) - Jean Paul Gibrat, Flight of the Raven
