= Dean Mullaney =

American editor, publisher, and designer (born 1954)

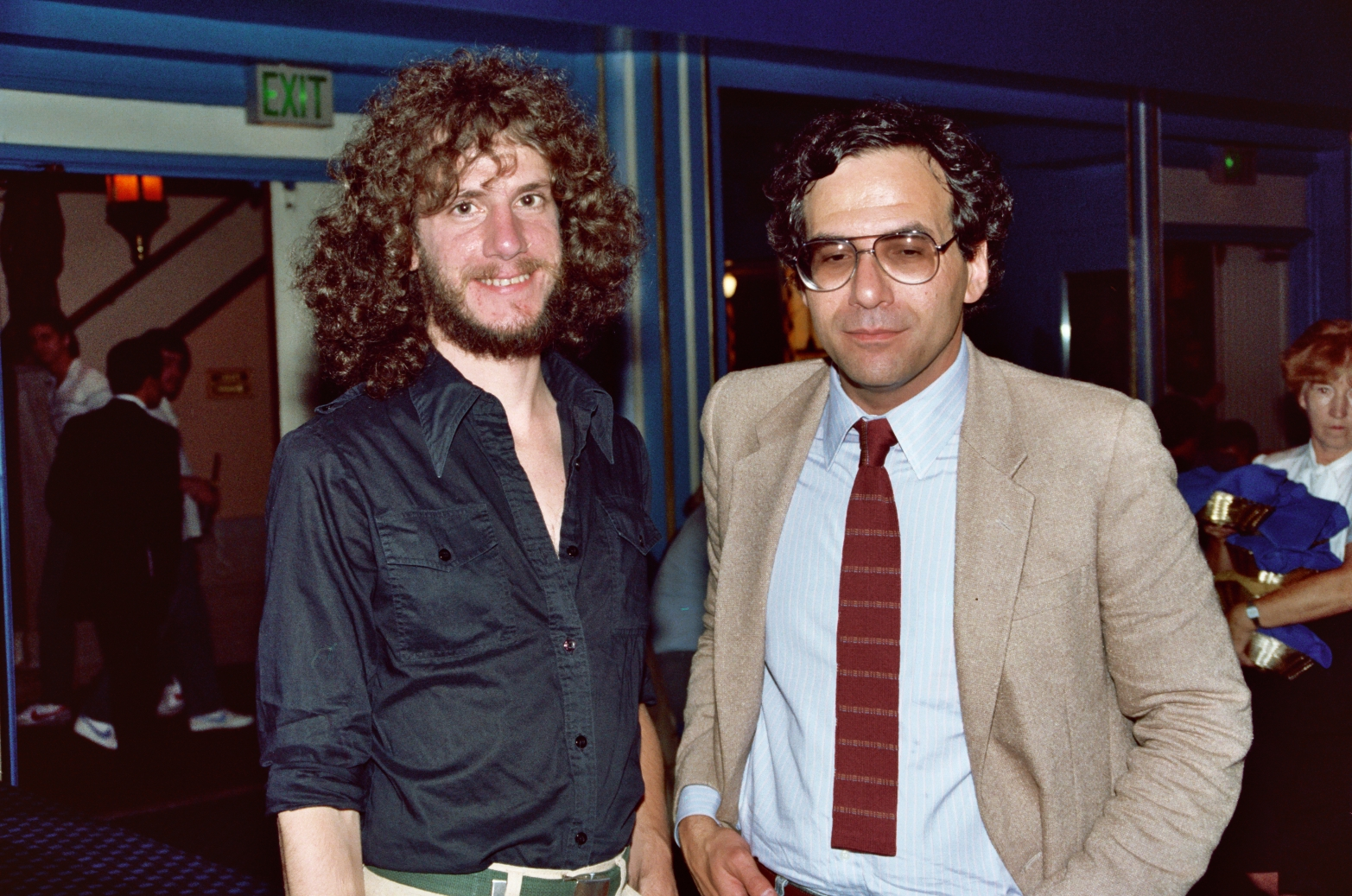
- Dean Mullaney (left) with comics writer Steve Gerber in 1982
- Born: June 18, 1954 (age 72)
- Area: Publisher
- Notable works: Eclipse Books; The Library of American Comics; EuroComics
- Awards: 2008, 2010–11 Eisner Awards
- Spouse: Catherine Yronwode (m. 1987; div. 1993)

Dean Mullaney (born June 18, 1954) is an American editor, publisher, and designer whose Eclipse Enterprises, founded in 1977, was one of the earliest independent comic-book companies. Eclipse published some of the first graphic novels and was one of the first comics publishers to champion creators' rights. In the 2000s, he established the imprint The Library of American Comics of IDW Publishing to publish hardcover collections of comic strips. Mullaney and his work have received seven Eisner Awards.

== Biography ==
Dean Mullaney and his brother, rock musician Jan Mullaney, are the sons of early electronica musician Dave Mullaney of the band Hot Butter. The brothers founded Eclipse Enterprises in Staten Island, New York City, New York, in 1977, and the following year published one of the first original graphic novels, Sabre: Slow Fade of an Endangered Species. Written by Don McGregor and drawn by Paul Gulacy, Sabre was additionally the first graphic novel sold through the new "direct market" of comic-book stores. Eclipse went on to publish the anthology magazine Eclipse and the color-comic anthology Eclipse Monthly, the first of an Eclipse Comics line that eventually included such titles and creators as The Rocketeer by Dave Stevens; Zot! by Scott McCloud; two Detectives Inc. graphic novels by McGregor and artists Marshall Rogers and Gene Colan, respectively; the graphic novel Stewart the Rat by writer Steve Gerber and artists Colan and Tom Palmer; and the U.S. reprints of Miracleman by Alan Moore. Eclipse also brought out graphic novels featuring opera adaptations, such as The Magic Flute by P. Craig Russell, and children's literature such as The Hobbit by J. R. R. Tolkien.

In 1980 Mullaney moonlighted as co-editor of the brand-new hobbyist publication Comics Feature, produced by Hal Schuster's New Media Publishing, but left after one year to focus on Eclipse.

In the early 1980s, Mullaney met writer-editor Catherine Yronwode, who was working for cartoonist and entrepreneur Will Eisner. Yronwode recalled that Eisner and his wife Ann "hosted a party for me with all these comic book men I was flirting with. All these men came up; they all wanted to meet Will. One of them was Dean Mullaney, the co-owner of Eclipse Comics, a small independent publishing house. He was the most flirtatious." At some point afterward, once Yronwode finished her work organizing Eisner's archives, she and Mullaney became engaged and moved to California, where they were married.

By the late 1980s, Eclipse was selling a half-million comics a month, and was the third largest comics publisher after Marvel Comics and DC Comics.

In 1986, Eclipse lost most of its back-issue stock in a flood. This event, along with the repercussions of Mullaney's divorce from Yronwode, by then his partner at Eclipse, and the mid-1990s collapse of the direct market distribution system, caused the company to cease operations in 1994 and file for bankruptcy in 1995. The company's intellectual property rights were later acquired by Todd McFarlane. Mullaney also attributed the company's demise to a problematic contract with the book publisher HarperCollins. Eclipse's last publication was its Spring 1993 catalog, which was a complete bibliography of its publications.

In the mid-2000s, Mullaney approached IDW Publishing with a proposal to publish hardcover reprints of American comic strips. This became the IDW imprint The Library of American Comics, which debuted with the 2007 book The Complete Terry and the Pirates, Vol. 1: 1934-1936, by Milton Caniff. As Mullaney described, "Terry's always been my favorite strip, and I was going to publish it in the early '80s (through Eclipse Comics), but Terry Nantier at NBM beat me to it. Luckily, I've lived long enough so that 25 years later I'm in a position to release new editions of Terry." With Mullaney as its creative director, the imprint has gone on to publish collections of strips including Dick Tracy, Little Orphan Annie, Bringing Up Father, Family Circus, and Bloom County.

In 2014, Mullaney added another imprint at IDW, EuroComics, in order to publish new English translations of European comics, including Hugo Pratt’s Corto Maltese, Paracuellos by Carlos Giménez, and Alack Sinner by Muñoz and Sampaya.

In December, 2021 it was announced that LoAC and EuroComics would move from IDW to a new publisher, Clover Press.

== Awards ==
As creative director and editor of The Library of American Comics, Mullaney has won seven Eisner awards and one Harvey Award. Eisner source unless otherwise indicated:

- 2008 Eisner Award: Best Archival Collection/Project - Comic Strips: Complete Terry and the Pirates, vol. 1, by Milton Caniff (IDW)
- 2010 Eisner Award: Best Archival Collection/Project - Comic Strips: Bloom County: The Complete Library, vol. 1, by Berkeley Breathed, edited by Scott Dunbier (IDW)
- 2011 Eisner Award: Best Archival Collection/Project - Comic Strips: Archie: The Complete Daily Newspaper Strips, 1946–1948, by Bob Montana, edited by Greg Goldstein (IDW)
- 2014 Eisner Award: Best Archival Collection/Project - Comic Strips: Tarzan: The Complete Russ Manning Newspaper Strips, vol. 1, edited by Dean Mullaney (LOAC/IDW)
- 2014 Eisner Award: Best Comics-Related Book: Genius, Illustrated: The Life and Art of Alex Toth, by Dean Mullaney and Bruce Canwell (LOAC/IDW)
- 2014 Eisner Award: Best Publication Design: Genius, Illustrated: The Life and Art of Alex Toth, designed by Dean Mullaney (LOAC/IDW)
- 2015 Eisner Award: Best Comics-Related Book: Genius Animated: The Cartoon Art of Alex Toth, vol. 3, by Dean Mullaney & Bruce Canwell (IDW/LOAC)

Mullaney won a 2012 Harvey Award for Best Biographical, Historical or Journalistic Presentation for Genius, Illustrated: The Life and Art of Alex Toth.

Additionally, Mullaney received San Diego Comic-Con's Inkpot Award in 2013. The following year, he was inducted into editor-publisher Robert Overstreet's Overstreet Hall of Fame.
