= List of The Library of American Comics publications =

The Library of American Comics is an American publisher of comic strip reprint collections, as an imprint of Clover Press. Although the publishing of a series was advertised as going to be the "complete collection" of a strip, more than half of all LoAC titles were discontinued long before being complete, sometimes after only one or two volumes.

After the conclusion of the final collection series—For Better or For Worse—in November 2024 (plus a deluxe edition of Terry And the Pirates issued by Clover Press), no further LoAC titles have been produced.

== Collections ==
Collections
Release date	LoAC Title	Original title	Creator(s)	Period	Number of volumes	Daily strips	Sunday strips	Reproduction color	Book size	Status
September 2007 – March 2009	The Complete Terry and the Pirates	Terry and the Pirates	Milton Caniff	1934–1946	6	Yes	Yes	Black-and-white (Dailies) & Full color (Sundays)	11 × 8.5 inches (279 × 216 mm)	Complete
November 2006 – December 2020	The Complete Chester Gould's Dick Tracy	Dick Tracy	Chester Gould	1931–1977	29	Yes	Yes	Black-and-white (Dailies & Sundays)	9.5 × 7 inches (241 × 178 mm); Vol. 1-6 11 × 8.5 inches (279 × 216 mm); Vol. 7-onwards	Complete
June 2008 – November 2019	The Complete Little Orphan Annie	Little Orphan Annie	Harold Gray	1924–1953	16	Yes	Yes	Black-and-white (Dailies) & Full color (Sundays)	11 × 8.5 inches (279 × x 216 mm)	Discontinued after 16 volumes
September 2009 – November 2012	Bloom County: The Complete Library	Bloom County	Berkeley Breathed	1980–1989	5+2	Yes	Yes	Black-and-white (Dailies) & Full color (Sundays)	11 × 8.5 inches (279 × x 216 mm)	Complete
October 2009 – July 2010	The Family Circus	The Family Circus	Bil Keane	1960–1963	2	Yes	Yes	?	11 × 7.5 inches (279 × 191 mm)	Discontinued after two volumes
November 2009 – July 2019	The Complete Rip Kirby	Rip Kirby	Alex Raymond, John Prentice	1946–1975	11	Yes	Yes	Black-and-white (Dailies)	11 × 10 inches (279 × 254 mm)	Discontinued after 11 volumes
January 2010 – March 2013	The Complete King Aroo	King Aroo	Jack Kent	1950–1954	2	Yes	Yes	?	9.5 × 7.5 inches (241 × 191 mm)	Discontinued after two volumes
January 2010 – April 2013	Bringing Up Father	Bringing Up Father	George McManus	1937-1940	2	Yes	Yes	Black-and-white (Dailies) & Full color (Sundays)?	11 × 10 inches (279 × 254 mm)	Discontinued after two volumes
April 2010 – December 2017	Li'l Abner: The Complete Dailies & Color Sundays	Li'l Abner	Al Capp	1934–1952	9	Yes	Yes	Black-and-white (Dailies) & Full color (Sundays)	9.25 × 12 (235 × 305 mm)	Discontinued after nine volumes
September 2010 – July 2014	Archie - The Complete Daily Newspaper Comics	Archie	Bob Montana	1946–1948; 1960-1965	3	Yes	Yes	Black-and-white (Dailies) & Full color (Sundays)	11 × 8.5 inches (279 × 216 mm)	Discontinued after three volumes
September 2010 – August 2015	X-9: Secret Agent Corrigan	X-9	Al Williamson, Archie Goodwin, George Evans	1969–1982	6	Yes	N/A	Black-and-white (Dailies)	11 × 10 inches (279 × 254 mm)	Discontinued after six volumes
October 2010 – January 2012	Blondie : The Complete Daily Comics	Blondie	Chic Young	1930–1935	2	Yes	No	Black-and-white (Dailies)	11 × 8.5 inches (279 × 216 mm)	Discontinued after two volumes
December 2010 – January 2016	Polly and Her Pals	Polly and Her Pals	Cliff Sterrett	1913–1930	2	No	Yes	Full color (Sundays)	12 × 16 inches (305 × 406 mm)	Discontinued after two volumes
July 2011 – October 2013	Miss Fury: Sensational Sundays	Miss Fury	Tarpé Mills	1944–1949	2	No	Yes	Full color (Sundays)	9.25 × 12 inches (235 × 305 mm)	Discontinued after two volumes
December 2011 – May 2014	Flash Gordon and Jungle Jim	Flash Gordon, Jungle Jim	Alex Raymond	1934–1944	4	No	Yes	Full color (Sundays)	12 × 16 inches (305 × 406 mm)	Complete
January 2012 – November 2022	Steve Canyon	Steve Canyon	Milton Caniff	1947–1970	12	Yes	Yes	Black-and-white (Dailies) & Full color (Sundays)?	11 × 8.5 inches (279 × 216 mm)	Discontinued after 12 volumes
October 2012	Gasoline Alley	Gasoline Alley	Frank King, Dick Moores	1964–1966	1	Yes	No	Black-and-white (Dailies)	11 × 8.5 inches (279 × 216 mm)	Discontinued after a single volume
October 2012 – May 2018	Skippy: Complete Dailies	Skippy	Percy Crosby	1925–1936	4	Yes	No	Black-and-white (Dailies)	9.5 × 8.5 inches (241 × 216 mm)	Discontinued after four volumes
December 2012 – October 2013	Star Trek: The Newspaper Strip	Star Trek	Thomas Warkentin, Sherman DiVono, Ron Harris, Martin Pasko	1979–1983	2	Yes	Yes	Black-and-white (Dailies) & Full color (Sundays)	8.5 × 11 inches (216 × 279 mm)	Complete
June 2013 – April 2015	Tarzan: The Complete Russ Manning Newspaper Strips	Tarzan	Russ Manning	1967–1979	4	Yes	Yes	Black-and-white	11 × 8.5 inches (279 × 216 mm)	Complete
August 2013 – December 2014	Superman: The Silver Age Dailies	Superman	Jerry Siegel, Wayne Boring	1959–1966	3	Yes	No	Black-and-white (Dailies)	11 × 8.5 inches (279 × 216 mm)	Complete
February 2014 – November 2014	Superman: Golden Age Sundays	Superman	Jack Burnley, Wayne Boring	1943–1949	2	No	Yes	Full color (Sundays)	9.25 × 12 inches (235 × 305 mm)	Complete
April 2014 – December 2014	Popeye: The Classic Newspaper Comics by Bobby London	Popeye	Bobby London	1986–1992	2	Yes	Yes	Black-and-white (Dailies) & Full color (Sundays)	8.5 × 7.5 inches (216 × 191 mm)	Complete
April 2014 – November 2016	Batman: Silver Age Newspaper Comics	Batman	Whitney Ellsworth, Sheldon Moldoff, Carmine Infantino, Joe Giella, Al Plastino	1966–1972	3	Yes	Yes	Black-and-white (Dailies) & Full color (Sundays)	11 × 8.5 inches (279 × 216 mm)	Complete
October 2014	Ripley's Believe It or Not! - The Original Classic Cartoons	Ripley's Believe It or Not!	Robert Ripley	1929	1	Yes	Yes	Black-and-white (Dailies) & Full color (Sundays)	11 × 8.5 inches (279 × 216 mm)	Discontinued after a single volume
June 2015 – May 2019	The Amazing Spider-Man: The Ultimate Newspaper Comics Collection	The Amazing Spider-Man	Stan Lee, John Romita Jr.	1977–1986	5	Yes	Yes	Black-and-white (Dailies) & Full color (Sundays)	11 × 8.5 inches (279 × 216 mm)	Discontinued after five volumes
July 2015 – December 2017	Superman: Atomic Age Sundays	Superman	Alvin Schwartz, Wayne Boring, Bill Finger	1949–1959	3	No	Yes	Full color (Sundays)	9.25 × 12 inches (235 × 305 mm)	Complete
September 2015 – March 2019	Donald Duck: The Complete Daily Newspaper Comics	Donald Duck	Al Taliaferro	1938–1950	5	Yes	No	Black-and-white (Dailies)	11 × 8.5 inches (279 × 216 mm)	Discontinued after five volumes
April 2016 – December 2016	Donald Duck: The Complete Sunday Newspaper Comics	Donald Duck	Al Taliaferro	1938–1945	2	No	Yes	Full color (Sundays)	12 × 8.5 inches (305 × 216 mm)	Discontinued after two volumes
April 2016 – September 2017	Star Trek: The Classic UK Comics: The Complete Series	Star Trek	Harry Lindfield, Jim Balkie, Mike Noble and others	1969–1979	3	Yes	Yes	Black-and-white (Dailies) & Full color (Sundays)	8.5 × 11 inches (216 × 279 mm)	Complete
May 2016 – September 2019	Silly Symphonies: The Complete Disney Classics	Silly Symphony	Al Taliaferro, Earl Duvall, Hank Porter, Bob Grant	1932–1945	4	No	Yes	Full color (Sundays)	12 × 8.5 inches (305 × 216 mm)	Complete
November 2016	Red Barry	Red Barry	William Gould	1934–1935	1	Yes	Yes	Black-and-white (Dailies) & Full color (Sundays)	11 × 8.5 inches (279 × 216 mm)	Discontinued after a single volume
November 2016 – June 2018	Walt Disney's Treasury of Classic Tales	Walt Disney's Treasury of Classic Tales	Frank A. Reilly	19?–TBA	3	No	Yes	Full color (Sundays)	12 × 8.5 inches (305 × 216 mm)	Discontinued after three volumes
April 2017 – May 2019	Superman: The Golden Age Dailies	Superman	Jerry Siegel, Whitney Ellisworth, Joe Shuster, Wayne Boring	1942–1949	3	Yes	No	Black-and-white (Dailies)	11 × 8.5 inches (279 × 216 mm)	Complete
April 2017 – August 2018	Star Hawks	Star Hawks	Writing:Ron Goulart; Art:Gil Kane	1977–1981	3	Yes	Yes	Black-and-white (Dailies) & Full color (Sundays)	9.25 × 6.5 inches (235 × 165 mm)	Complete
May 2017 – September 2018	Star Wars: The Complete Classic Newspaper Comics	Star Wars	Don R. Christensen	1979–1984	3	Yes	Yes	Black-and-white (Dailies) & Full color (Sundays)	11 × 8.5 inches (279 × 216 mm)	Complete
October 2017 – November 2024	For Better or For Worse - The Complete Library	For Better or For Worse	Lynn Johnston	1979–2008	9	Yes	Yes	Black-and-white (Dailies) & Full color (Sundays)	11 × 8.5 inches (279 × 216 mm)	Complete
October 2018 - November 2019	Superman: The Silver Age Sundays	Superman	Jerry Siegel, Wayne Boring	1959–1966	2	No	Yes	Full color(Sundays)	9.25 × 12 inches (235 × 305 mm)	Complete

== Single releases ==
Single releases
Release date	LoAC Title	Original title	Creator(s)	Period	Number of vol.	Daily strips	Sunday strips	Reproduction color	Book size	ISBN
October 2014	Wonder Woman: The Complete Newspaper Strips	Wonder Woman	William Moulton Marston, H. G. Peter	1944-1945	1	Yes	Yes	Black-and-white (Dailies) & Full color (Sundays)	11 × 8.5 inches (279 mm × 216 mm)	978-1-63140-435-1
October 2015	From Brooklyn Rock to Beyond Mars: The Complete Series	Beyond Mars	Jack Williamson, Lee Elias	1952-1955	1	No	Yes	Full color	9.25 × 12 inches (235 × 305 mm)	978-1-63140-435-1
September 2017	Disney's Christmas Classics	Disney Christmas Story	Frank A. Reilly	1960-1997	1	Yes	Yes	Black-and-white (Dailies) & Black-and-white (Sundays)	11 × 8.5 inches (279 × 216 mm)	978-1-68405-006-2

== LoAC Essentials ==
LoAC Essentials or The Library of American Comics - Essentials is a series of books, published between 2012 and 2019, that collected reprints of classic daily newspaper comic strips which are considered as essentials of comic history in different aspects due to their impact on the medium itself, in volumes by strip title and original publication year. LoAC Essentials were published in hardcovers with the odd format of 11.5 inches × 4.25 inches, 292 mm × 108 mm. The comic strips were printed one strip per page in black-and-white together with the original publication date and weekday. Each volume contained one year of a comic strip's run. Extras such as introductions and essays were included in some of the volumes.

LoAC Essentials
Release date	Title	Year	Comic strip	Author	Page count	ISBN
2012-12-04	LOAC Essentials Vol. 1: Baron Bean Vol. 1	1916	Baron Bean	George Herriman	336	978-1613774427
2013-04-09	LOAC Essentials Vol. 2: The Gumps - The Saga of Mary Gold	1929	The Gumps	Sidney Smith	344	978-1613775738
2013-09-10	LOAC Essentials Vol. 3: Polly and Her Pals	1933	Polly and Her Pals	Cliff Sterrett	336	978-1613776988
2014-02-11	LOAC Essentials Vol. 4: Alley Oop	1939	Alley Oop	V.T. Hamlin	344	978-1613778296
2014-07-15	LOAC Essentials Vol. 5: The Bungle Family	1930	The Bungle Family	Harry J. Tuthill	344	978-1613779583
2015-02-24	LOAC Essentials Vol. 6: Baron Bean Vol. 2	1917	Baron Bean	George Herriman	328	978-1631401572
2015-06-30	LOAC Essentials Vol. 7: Tarzan of the Apes	1929	Tarzan	Writer: Edgar Rice Burroughs; Artist(s): Hal Foster, Rex Maxon	336	978-1631402616
2016-08-30	LOAC Essentials Vol. 8 King Features Essentials 1: Krazy Kat	1934	Krazy Kat	George Herriman	336	978-1631404085
2016-10-18	LOAC Essentials Vol. 9 King Features Essentials 2: Tim Tyler's Luck	1933	Tim Tyler's Luck	Lyman Young, Alex Raymond	396	978-1631406973
2017-04-18	LOAC Essentials Vol. 10: Dan Dunn - Secret Operative 48	1933	Dan Dunn	Norman Marsh	344	978-1631408557
2018-03-13	LOAC Essentials Vol. 11: "Cap" Stubbs and Tippie	1945	Cap Stubbs and Tippie	Edwina Dumm	384	978-1684050130
2018-12-11	LOAC Essentials Vol. 12: Baron Bean Vol. 3	1918	Baron Bean	George Herriman	344	978-1684053551
2019-08-13	LOAC Essentials Vol. 13: Charlie Chan	1938	Charlie Chan	Alfred Andriola	344	978-1684055067
2019-12-17	LOAC Essentials Vol. 14: Barney Google	1928	Barney Google	Billy DeBeck	352	978-1684055784

== Factual, historical and biographical titles ==
Titles
Release date	Title	Author(s)	Subject	Period	Creator(s)	Page count	Binding	Book size	ISBN
2008-08-12	Scorchy Smith and the Art of Noel Sickles	Bruce Canwell	The complete Scorchy Smith comic strip, Biography & Art	1933-1936	Noel Sickles	392	Hardcover	11 × 11 inches (279 × 279 mm)	978-1-60010-206-6
2011-05-10	Genius, Isolated: The Life and Art of Alex Toth	Dean Mullaney, Bruce Canwell	Biography, Art	?	Alex Toth	328	Hardcover	9.5 × 13 inches (241 × 330 mm)	978-1-60010-828-0
2011-08-16	Caniff: A Visual Biography	Dean Mullaney	Biography	?	Milton Caniff	328	Hardcover	11 × 11 inches (279 × 279 mm)	978-1-60010-920-1
2011-12-27	Chuck Jones: The Dream That Never Was	Dean Mullaney, Kurtis Findlay	Biography	?	Chuck Jones	280	Hardcover	11 × 8.5 inches (279 × 216 mm)	978-1-61377-030-6
2013-02-26	Genius, Illustrated: The Life and Art of Alex Toth	Dean Mullaney, Bruce Canwell	Biography, Art	1960s–2006	Alex Toth	288	Hardcover	9.5 × 13 inches (241 × 330 mm)	978-1-61377-024-5
2014-06-03	Genius, Animated: The Life and Art of Alex Toth	Dean Mullaney, Bruce Canwell	Biography, Art	?	Alex Toth	328	Hardcover	9.5 × 13 inches (241 × 330 mm)	978-1-61377-950-7
2014-10-14	Puck - What Fools These Mortals Be!: The Story of Puck	Michael Alexander Kahn, Richard Samuel West	Political caricature, political cartoon satire	1877–1918	various	328	Hardcover	12 × 11 inches (305 × 279 mm)	978-1-63140-046-9
2015-10-13	King of the Comics: One Hundred Years of King Features Syndicate	Bruce Canwell and others	Comic strip history	1914–2015	various	288	Hardcover	9.25 × 12 inches (235 × 305 mm)	978-1-63140-373-6
2018-04-17	The Goat Getters: Jack Johnson, the FIGHT of the CENTURY and How a Bunch of Raucous Cartoonists Reinvented Comics	Eddie Campbell	Comic strip history	Early 20th century?	various	320	Hardcover	11.4 × 9 inches (290 × 229 mm)	978-1-68405-138-0
2019-07-16	Treasures Retold: The Lost Art of Alex Toth	Dean Mullaney & Bruce Canwell	Comic strips, Art	?	Alex Toth	280	Hardcover	9.5 inches × 13 inches (241 mm × 330 mm)	978-1-68405-412-1
2019-10-08	SCREWBALL! The Cartoonists Who Made the Funnies Funny	Paul C. Tumey	Comic strip history	20th century	various	272	Hardcover	11 inches × 10.5 inches (279 mm × 267 mm)	978-1-68405-187-8
