= Paul Fung Jr. =

American cartoonist (1923–2016)

Paul Fung Jr.

Paul Fung Jr. (March 9, 1923 – April 8, 2016) was an American cartoonist who drew the Blondie comic book for 40 years. He was the son of Paul Fung, a cartoonist who drew the comic strip Dumb Dora for several years.

== Career ==
Fung Jr. was Chic Young's assistant on the Blondie newspaper strip from 1949 until 1965.

He also contributed to the Blondie comic book with his Flash Foley, News Photographer stories.

He was the son of Paul Fung, a cartoonist who drew the comic strip Dumb Dora for several years and had worked with Cliff Sterrett and Billy DeBeck. The elder Fung took over Dumb Dora when Chic Young left that strip.

Fung Jr. was featured on shows like The American Trail back in the 1980s, where, in an interview for the Journal Press, he talked about working at night, due to his "...little Craziness – I never see anything straight"; he also talked about the changing cartoonist industry due to the advent of television.

== Awards ==
In 1964, Fung Jr. received the National Cartoonists Society's Comic Book Award for his work, and 16 years later, he won their Best Humorist Award.
