= Bil Dwyer (cartoonist) =

American cartoonist and humorist (1907–1987)

- Born: January 29, 1907; Ohio, U.S.
- Died: December 13, 1987 (aged 80); Highlands, North Carolina, U.S.
- Occupations: Cartoonist, writer
- Years active: 1930s–1970s
- Known for: Dumb Dora

William Raphael Louis Dwyer Jr. (January 29, 1907 – December 13, 1987) was an American cartoonist and humorist. He was known for several newspaper comic strips in the 1930s and 1950s, including Dumb Dora and Sandy Hill, as well as a series of humorous books of Southern slang published in the 1970s.

== Early life ==
Dwyer was born in Ohio on January 29, 1907. The family lived in the Ohio towns of Portsmouth, Perrysburg and Paint when he was young. Dwyer attended Ohio State University around 1925, where he befriended fellow cartoonist Milton Caniff. Around this time, the two worked together at the Columbus Dispatch newspaper. Dwyer left Ohio State after only a few months to enroll in the Yale School of Art, in part to be closer to the New York publishing world. Dwyer sold gag cartoons to publications such as the New Yorker, College Humor and Collier's. He eventually dropped out of Yale also when his cartooning career began to take off.

== Career ==
=== Comic strips ===
He was hired at King Features Syndicate to be part of its artists' bullpen, and in 1932 was named to take over the comic strip Dumb Dora, the third to handle the strip after its creator Chic Young (who moved on to create the more successful strip Blondie) and Paul Fung. Dwyer's cartooning experience at the time was limited to single-panel cartoons; he had never worked on a daily cartoon strip. He hired Milton Caniff to help him by ghost-writing and drawing a number of strips, working closely with Dwyer for the first year and a half of Dwyer's tenure on the strip.

Comics historian Don Markstein was dismissive about Dwyer's era on the strip, and called his later works Sandy Hill and Mr. Dilly "even more minor." Writing in the 1983 book The World Encyclopedia of Comics, Maurice Horn wrote more charitably that Dwyer "drew a fresh, witty, well-scripted strip," but felt that the central concept of Dumb Dora had grown obsolete by the time Dwyer took over, saying that "the day of the flapper had gone with the 1920s, and the strip died in the middle 1930s." Allan Holtz, author of American Newspaper Comics: An Encyclopedic Reference Guide, felt that Dwyer continued the earlier eras of the strip "quite capably" and said that Dwyer's "style was a little looser, but still maintained a good thread all the way back to Young." Caniff himself took credit only for some of the art and none of the writing, calling Dwyer "a good gag man." Dumb Dora was canceled in 1936.

Also in the early 1930s, Dwyer worked on the strips Bing Brown and When Mother Was a Girl. When Mother Was a Girl, also created by Chic Young, was a "topper" to Dumb Dora that was laid out above the main strip in the comics pages. It was canceled simultaneously with Dora. Mr. Dilly began and ended in 1948. His final strip, Sandy Hill, about a boy and his family living in the country, was distributed by the Register and Tribune Syndicate from 1951 to 1954.

More than 300 of Dwyer's cartoons and sketches are archived in the Special Collections Research Center at Syracuse University. Others are housed in the Billy Ireland Cartoon Library & Museum at Ohio State University.

=== Merry Mountaineers ===
Dwyer's life and career in the 1940s to 1960s is not well documented by available sources. He enlisted in the U.S. Army in 1943 during World War II. He may also have been a ghostwriter for Wally Bishop's comic strip Muggs and Skeeter while Bishop was serving in World War II. A 1975 article in the Daytona Beach Sunday News-Journal claims that he worked for Walt Disney in the 1940s as unit production director on Bambi and Fantasia. At some point he moved with his wife to the small town of Horse Shoe, North Carolina to become a cattle and hog farmer, while also teaching art via correspondence and trying to market a series of his own inventions including a plastic artists' palette and various kitchen appliances. He then moved to the larger nearby town of Highlands and founded a publishing company, Merry Mountaineers, writing, illustrating and publishing a series of humorous books and pamphlets about Southern language such as Dictionary For Yankees and Other Uneducated People, Cookin' Yankees Ain't Et, and How Tuh Live in the Kooky South Without Eatin' Grits: A Fun Guide Book Fer Yankees. Dwyer's books, often co-written with his wife, were popular in the Appalachian and Southern regions of the United States.

== Death ==
Dwyer died on December 13, 1987, in Highlands, North Carolina.
