= Dynamic Man =

Dynamic Man was a name shared by two Golden Age superheroes:

- Dynamic Man (Timely Comics)
- Dynamic Man (Dynamic Publications)
