= Flight 470 =

Flight 470 may refer to:

- National Airlines Flight 470, crashed on February 14, 1953
- LAM Mozambique Airlines Flight 470, crashed on 29 November 2013
