= Al Plastino =

American comic artist

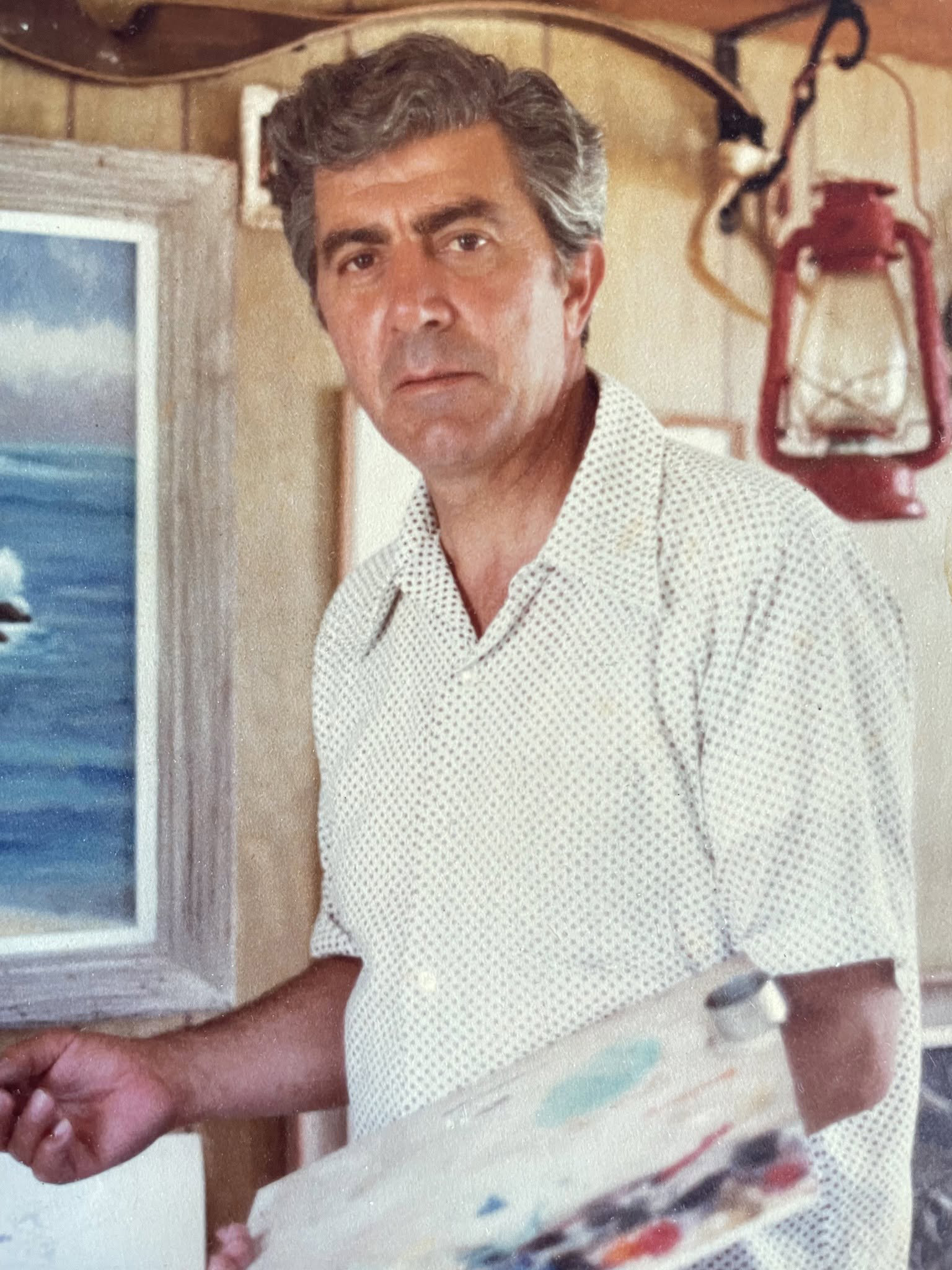
- Al Plastino in his studio, 1975
- Born: Alfred John Plastino; December 15, 1921 New York City, U.S.
- Died: November 25, 2013 (aged 91) Patchogue, New York, U.S.
- Areas: Writer, Penciller, Inker, Editor, Letterer, Colourist
- Notable works: Action Comics; Adventure Comics; Superboy; Superman
- Awards: Inkpot Award (2008)

Alfred John Plastino (December 15, 1921 – November 25, 2013) was an American comics artist best known as one of the most prolific Superman artists of the 1950s, along with his DC Comics colleague Wayne Boring. Plastino also worked as a comics writer, editor, letterer, and colorist.

With writer Otto Binder, he co-created the DC characters Supergirl and Brainiac, as well as the teenage team the Legion of Super-Heroes.

== Biography ==
=== Early life and career ===
Born at Saint Vincent's Catholic Medical Center in Manhattan, New York City, on December 15, 1921, and raised in The Bronx, Plastino was interested in art since grade school. He attended the School of Industrial Art in New York City, and afterward began illustrating for Youth Today magazine. He was accepted into the college Cooper Union but chose to continue working as a freelance artist. His earliest known credited comic-book work is as penciler-inker of the Dynamic Man and Major Victory superhero features and Green Knight medieval-adventure story in Dynamic Publications' Dynamic Comics #2 (cover-dated Dec. 1941). Before the war, Plastino inked some issues of Captain America Comics.

With the outbreak of World War II, Plastino and his brothers were drafted, and he served in the U.S. Army. There, a sketch he had made for a model airplane he had designed caught an officer's attention, leading to his being assigned to Grumman Aerospace Corporation, the National Inventors Council, and then The Pentagon. He was assigned there to the Adjutant General's office, where he designed war posters and field manuals. After his discharge he began working for Steinberg Studios, drawing Army posters.

=== Comics ===
While working out of a studio in New York City with two other cartoonists in 1948, Plastino showed sample art of Superman to DC Comics, which offered him work at $35 a page. Plastino, who had heard that Superman artists were receiving $55 a page, negotiated a $50 rate. Now settled in the comic book field, he largely dropped other commercial work for two decades. Early on at DC, Plastino was forced to copy Wayne Boring's style but gradually began using his own style. He did 48 Superman covers as well as countless DC stories. Plastino and writer Bill Finger produced the story for Superman #61 (Nov. 1949) in which kryptonite, which had originated on The Adventures of Superman radio program, made its way into the comic books. He drew the Lois Lane feature in Showcase #9 (Aug. 1957) which served as a tryout for the character's own series.

Plastino worked on several titles within the Superman family of comics, including Superboy and Superman's Girl Friend, Lois Lane. Plastino drew the Superboy story in Adventure Comics #247 (April 1958) that introduced the Legion of Super-Heroes, a teen superhero team from the future that eventually became one of DC's most popular features; with writer Otto Binder, Plastino co-created the first Legion characters, Cosmic Boy, Lightning Lad (as Lightning Boy) and Saturn Girl. Binder and Plastino debuted the villain Brainiac and the Bottle City of Kandor in Action Comics #242 (July 1958). The two men co-created Supergirl in Action Comics #252 (May 1959). Plastino drew the first appearance of the supervillain the Parasite in Action Comics #340 (Aug. 1966).

Plastino's "greatest pride"' was a story he drew for Superman #168 (April 1964, scheduled for publication Feb. 1964), titled "Superman's Mission for President Kennedy." The piece was done in collaboration with the Kennedy administration to help promote the president's national physical fitness program. In the story, Superman visits the White House, and trusts President John F. Kennedy with his secret identity. The story was produced shortly before Kennedy was assassinated, which led to the cancellation of its publication. At the behest of President Lyndon B. Johnson, it was published two months later, in Superman #170 (June 1964), with Plastino adding a title page showing a ghostly figure of Kennedy looking down from the heavens at Superman flying over Washington, D.C. Plastino had always believed the artwork had been donated to the John F. Kennedy Presidential Library and Museum in Boston, but the artwork was placed on auction by a private entity in late 2013. DC Entertainment subsequently purchased the art and donated it to the Library.

In the early 1970s, DC Comics, fearing Jack Kirby's versions of Superman and Jimmy Olsen were too different from their established representations, assigned Plastino (among other artists) to redraw those characters' heads in Kirby's various titles. In 1996, Plastino was one of the many artists who contributed to the Superman: The Wedding Album one-shot wherein the title character married Lois Lane.

=== Comic strips ===
Plastino drew the syndicated Batman with Robin the Boy Wonder comic strip from March 17, 1968, to January 1, 1972 and was the uncredited ghost artist on the Superman strip from 1960 to 1966. In 1970, he took over the syndicated strip Ferd'nand, which he drew until his retirement in 1989.

Plastino also worked on Sunday episodes of Nancy from 1982 to 1983 after Ernie Bushmiller died. Plastino's official website says the artist was commissioned by the United Media newspaper syndicate to ghost Peanuts when Charles Schulz underwent heart surgery in 1983, but David Michaelis, author of Schulz and Peanuts: A Biography, revealed that syndicate president William C. Payette had hired Plastino to draw a backlog of Peanuts strips during contract negotiations with Schulz in the 1970s. When Schulz and the syndicate reached a successful agreement, United Media stored these unpublished strips, the existence of which eventually became public.

== Awards ==
Al Plastino received an Inkpot Award in 2008.

== Personal life ==
Plastino lived for many years in Shirley, New York, on Long Island. At the time of his death on November 25, 2013, at Brookhaven Hospital in Patchogue, New York, he had been suffering from Guillain–Barré syndrome. He and his wife AnnMarie were married for 55 years. They had four children: Fred, Janice, Arlene, and the eldest, MaryAnn, who managed his business affairs.

== Bibliography ==
=== Avon Comics ===
- Molly O'Day #1 (1945)

=== Centaur Publications ===
- The Arrow #3 (1941)

=== Chesler/Dynamic ===
- Dynamic Comics #2, 13 (Dynamic Man) (1941–1945)
- Punch Comics #2, 11, 13–14, 16 (1942–1946)
- Spotlight Comics #2 (1945)

=== DC Comics ===
- Action Comics (Superman) #120, 122–128, 130–131, 133, 135, 139–140, 143, 145, 148–149, 152–157, 169–170, 172, 176–177, 183, 185, 193, 197, 201, 205, 208, 212–214, 217, 220, 222, 228, 242, 247, 249, 251–252, 254–255, 259–260, 271, 273, 281–282, 289, 291–292, 294, 296, 300–302, 306, 308, 314, 317, 320, 322–324, 328–329, 331–335, 337, 340, 341–345, 354, 361 (1948–1968)
- Adventure Comics (Superboy) #245, 247, 253, 256, 268, 271, 276, 278, 281, 286, 292, 294, 296, 298, 324, 333, 335, 341, 344 (1958–1966)
- Girls' Love Stories #12 (1951)
- Showcase #9 (Lois Lane) (1957)
- Superboy #59–60, 62, 65, 67, 79, 81, 83, 86, 88, 90, 93, 96, 98, 102, 105, 107–108, 110, 114, 116, 125, 128–129, 133, 137, 140, 143, 149 (1957–1968)
- Superman #53–56, 58–59, 61, 63–69, 71–73, 75–109, 112, 114–118, 120, 122, 124–125, 129–131, 133, 135–136, 138–139, 144–147, 150–153, 157, 160–161, 163–165, 169–171, 173–174, 178–180, 183–184, 186, 191, 193–194, 196–198, 201–206 (1948–1968)
- Superman's Girl Friend, Lois Lane #5, 12, 18, 20 (1958–1960)
- Superman's Pal Jimmy Olsen #50, 55–56, 60, 64, 73, 76, 78, 87 (1961–1965)
- Superman: The Wedding Album #1 (1996)
- World's Finest Comics #34, 39–43, 47, 49, 51, 54–58, 60–61, 64, 67, 70, 165 (1948–1967)

=== Harvey Comics ===
- All-New Short Story Comics #2 (1943)

=== Magazine Enterprises ===
- The American Air Forces #1–3, 74 (1944–1953)

=== Marvel Comics ===
- Marvel Mystery Comics #33–36 (1942)

Preceded by Win Mortimer	Action Comics penciller 1948–1968	Succeeded by Ross Andru
Preceded by Win Mortimer	Superman penciller 1948–1968	Succeeded by Curt Swan
Preceded by John Sikela	Superboy penciller 1957–1968	Succeeded by Bob Brown
