= Superman: The Complete Comic Strips 1939–1966 =

American Comic Strip

Superman: The Complete Comic Strips

Publication information
- Publisher: The Library of American Comics
- Format: Hardcover
- Genre: Superhero
- Publication date: August 13, 2013
- No. of issues: Golden Age; Newspaper Dailies: 3 Sundays: 2 Atomic Age; Newspaper Dailies: TBA; Sundays: 3 Silver Age; Newspaper Dailies: 3 Sundays: 2 Total: TBA
- Main character(s): Superman

Creative team
- Written by: Jerry Siegel; Whitney Ellsworth; Alvin Schwartz; Bill Finger
- Artist(s): Joe Shuster; Wayne Boring; Curt Swan; Stan Kaye
- Editor(s): Dean Mullaney

Superman: The Complete Comic Strips 1939–1966 is an unofficial umbrella name for the six following titles: Superman: The Golden Age Dailies, Superman: The Golden Age Sundays; Superman: The Atomic Age Dailies, Superman: The Atomic Age Sundays; Superman: The Silver Age Dailies and Superman: The Silver Age Sundays, all published by The Library of American Comics. These six series of books collects the complete run of the American comic strip Superman by DC Comics, which was originally distributed in newspapers by the McClure Syndicate between 1939 and 1966.

== Background ==
In 1998 and 1999 Kitchen Sink Press and DC Comics published hardcover collections, one each of the first years of the daily, and the first years of the Sunday Superman comic strip. Kitchen Sink went out of business the same year, after nearly thirty years in business.

After several years of prior negotiations between Greg Goldstein of IDW Publishing and DC Comics with the goal of getting the reprinting rights to the Superman, Batman and Wonder Woman comic strips, a deal was struck in 2013 to finally include them in The Library of American Comics' line of reprint collections. The IDW books do not feature any of the strips reprinted by Kitchen Sink in their two volumes (Superman dailies 1939–42, Superman Sundays 1939–43), and thus pick up where they left off.

Superman comic strip collector Sidney Friedfertig, who contributed much the source material to these LOAC book series, had succeeded in collecting 97 percent of the daily strips in newspaper clippings from 1959 to 1966 and published it online at his own website in 2012. Since most of these clippings are in good publishable condition, compared to what have been available on microform in libraries, the clippings are far more suitable as source material for reproduction. After Friedfertig's publication of the comic strip on his website he was approached by IDW Publishing and The Library of American Comics about publishing the material he had collected in their upcoming Superman comic strip collections. Friedfertig's accomplishment was very substantial since the original proofs of the Superman daily strips were never archived by DC Comics after their initial publication, therefore there are no originals available.

In December 2015, The Library of American Comics reached out to comic collectors worldwide to acquire missing strips which they themselves had trouble locating, to use as source material for the books.

== Format ==
=== Volumes collecting dailies ===
Landscape orientation, 11 inches × 8.5 inches (280 mm × 216 mm), hardcover with sewn ribbon bookmark, Contains approximately 700-800 daily strips each, arranged three per page, reproduced in original black-and-white.

The daily strips are divided into three sub sets collections, one for each decade: The Golden Age – The 1940s, The Atomic Age – The 1950s (these volumes have yet to be published as of 2023), and The Silver Age – The 1960s.

Introductions featuring information about the creators, comparison and analysis of the storylines from the comic strips and the comic books. Some of the material used to reproduce the strips have been sourced from comic collectors newspaper clippings collections, therefore some art is not engraver's proof pristine, but can have noticeable smudging, however this is the best reproduction to date. Essays written by Sidney Friedfertig are included in the volumes.

=== Volumes collecting Sundays ===
Portrait orientation, 9.25 inches × 12 inches (235 mm × 305 mm), hardcover with clear art reproductions, in sharp full color and with a sewn linen bookmark.

The Sunday strips run is divided into three sub-sets: 1940s – Golden Age, 1950s – Atomic Age and 1960s – Silver Age, just as the daily strips also are collected.

Introductions written by Mark Waid and John Wells, pinpointing many of the featured storylines and other noteworthy facts. Each Sunday strip has the annotated original strip number and first publishing date noted. The Reproduction size is slightly smaller than the original Sunday paper sizing. Cover art, both front and back have been drawn by Pete Poplaski. Galleries of comic book covers done by the newspaper strips' artists are included.

== Volumes ==
=== Golden Age – The 1940s ===
The Golden Age Newspaper Dailies
Volume	Release date	Title	Period	Artist	Writer	Page count	ISBN
1	2017-04-01	Superman: Golden Age Dailies – Vol. 1: 1942–1944	1942–1944	Joe Shuster; Wayne Boring	Jerry Siegel; Whitney Ellsworth	288	978-1-63140-383-5
2	2018-05-22	Superman: Golden Age Dailies – Vol. 2: 1944–1947	1944–1947	Wayne Boring	Alvin Schwartz	272	978-1-68405-197-7
3	2019-05-21	Superman: Golden Age Dailies – Vol. 3: 1947–1949	1947–1949	Wayne Boring	Alvin Schwartz	260	978-1-68405-437-4

The Golden Age Sundays
Volume	Release date	Title	Period	Artist	Writer	Page count	ISBN
1	2014-02-11	Superman: Golden Age Sundays – Vol. 1: 1943–1946	1943–1946			184	978-1-61377-797-8
2	2014-11-18	Superman: Golden Age Sundays – Vol. 2: 1946–1949	1946–1949	Wayne Boring	Jerry Siegel; Alvin Schwartz	180	978-1-63140-109-1

=== Atomic Age – The 1950s ===
The Atomic Age Newspaper Dailies
Volume	Release date	Title	Period	Artist	Writer	Page count	ISBN
1	TBA	Superman: Atomic Age Dailies – Vol. 1	TBA	TBA	TBA	TBA	xxx-x-xxxxx-xxx-x

The Atomic Age Sundays
Volume	Release date	Title	Period	Artist	Writer	Page count	ISBN
1	2015-07-28	Superman: Atomic Age Sundays – Vol. 1: 1949–1953	1949–1953	Wayne Boring	Alvin Schwartz	180	978-1-63140-262-3
2	2016-04-05	Superman: Atomic Age Sundays – Vol. 2: 1953–1956	1953–1956	Wayne Boring	Alvin Schwartz	180	978-1-63140-537-2
3	2017-12-26	Superman: Atomic Age Sundays – Vol. 3: 1956–1959	1956–1959	Wayne Boring	Alvin Schwartz; Bill Finger	184	978-1-68405-061-1

=== Silver Age – The 1960s ===
The Silver Age Newspaper Dailies
Volume	Release date	Title	Period	Artist	Writer	Page count	ISBN
1	2013-08-13	Superman: Silver Age Dailies – Vol. 1: 1959–1961	1959–1961	Curt Swan; Stan Kaye; Wayne Boring	Jerry Siegel	288	978-1-61377-666-7
2	2014-04-29	Superman: Silver Age Dailies – Vol. 2: 1961–1963	1961–1963	Wayne Boring	Jerry Siegel	288	978-1-61377-923-1
3	2014-12-23	Superman: Silver Age Dailies – Vol. 3: 1963–1966	1963–1966	Wayne Boring	Jerry Siegel	288	978-1-63140-179-4

The Silver Age Sundays
Volume	Release date	Title	Period	Artist	Writer	Page count	ISBN
1	2018-11-27	Superman: Silver Age Sundays – Vol. 1: 1959–1963	1959–1963	Wayne Boring	Jerry Siegel	184	978-1-68405-387-2
2	2019-11-19	Superman: Silver Age Sundays – Vol. 2: 1963–1966	1963–1966	Wayne Boring	Jerry Siegel	184	978-1-68405-554-8
