= Polly and Her Pals =

1912–1958 American newspaper comic strip

Cliff Sterrett's Polly and Her Pals (July 27, 1952)

Polly and Her Pals is an American comic strip, created by cartoonist Cliff Sterrett, which ran from December 4, 1912, until December 7, 1958. It is regarded as one of the most graphically innovative strips of the 20th century. It debuted as Positive Polly on December 4, 1912, in William Randolph Hearst's newspapers, initially the New York Journal, and was later distributed by King Features Syndicate. The title changed to Polly and Her Pals on January 17, 1913.

== Characters and story ==
- Polly Perkins – The nominal star of the strip was a pretty young girl, a flirtatious child of the Suffragette movement and a precursor of the Jazz Age 1920s flappers. Over time, the center of the action changed from Polly to those around her, and thus the title changed to Polly and Her Pals—though the "pals" were in fact members of her family: her parents and cousins.
- Paw (a.k.a. Sam'l or Sambo) Perkins – Polly's excitable father, the main character and real star of the strip.
- Maw (aka Suzie) Perkins – Polly's headstrong mother was the one with common sense, who usually sided with Polly.
- Ashur Earl Perkins – Staying with them was their dimwitted nephew Ash, a font of bad advice.
- Carrie – Paw's sister-in-law, a constant house guest (and irritant).
- Gertrude – Carrie's precocious, spoiled brat of a daughter.
- Neewah – The family's Japanese houseboy, who mostly did not understand what was going on (or pretended not to).
- Kitty – An ever-present black housecat, who sometimes played a comic part in the strips.

== Toppers ==
=== Dot and Dash ===
An accompanying topper strip, also drawn by Sterrett, was created to run above Polly on Sundays—a pantomime strip called Dot and Dash, which ran from February 21, 1926, to June 24, 1928. Originally titled Damon and Pythias, about the antics of a cat and dog—they became two dogs in 1926. Highlighting Sterrett's panels were oddly stylized backgrounds (trees, houses, windows, staircases), occasionally drawn in a distorted, cubist style.

=== Belles and Wedding Bells ===
Belles and Wedding Bells was another topper created by Sterrett, which ran from June 22, 1930, to 1943. Unlike Dot and Dash, Belles (originally called Sweethearts and Wives) had dialogue, and a constantly changing cast made up of diverse romantic human couples. The strip played up the ironic contrasts between courtship and marriage. Each episode began with a scene of pre-married bliss, followed by an "intermission" panel framed with wedding bells and an ominous caption: "And then they were married..." The exact same scenario would then be re-enacted post-wedding by the now-jaded couple—with drastically different results. Starting on March 31, 1935, Belles and Wedding Bells alternated as the topper with a variant called And So They Were Never Married.

Sterrett was initially the sole creator of the comic, producing both daily and Sunday strips. During the 1930s, however, Sterrett's arthritis prompted him to assign work on the daily strips to assistants Paul Fung and Vernon Greene. The daily strip ended in the 1940s. The last Sunday page, still drawn by Sterrett, was published on June 15, 1958.

== Influence and legacy ==
Polly and Her Pals was the first of several comic strips about flirting pretty girls, including Edgar Martin's Boots and Her Buddies, Chic Young's Blondie and Larry Whittington's Fritzi Ritz (which later spawned Nancy). Although Polly and Her Pals was highly influential, it was never a licensing success, and it lacked the spin-off books and merchandise generated by other contemporary comic strips.

The comic was not only remarkable for its creation of a new subgenre and prototype, but also for its cubism-inspired graphics.

Now, Sterrett—that's the guy who was the greatest. To think that a whole generation has grown up worshipping Picasso when the guy who did it far better was Sterrett! Far better than Picasso—and Herriman. I love Herriman—he has his own special place. But I love Sterrett—he belongs someplace else ...

— Al Capp, Cartoonist PROfiles #37, March 1978

Six full-color Polly Sunday pages were prominently featured in Bill Blackbeard's The Smithsonian Collection of Newspaper Comics (Abrams, 1977), representing for many modern fans their first opportunity to see the strip. It is now considered one of the masterpieces of American comic strips of the Interwar period, both for its graphic qualities and its storytelling and humor. Sterrett has been lauded as one of the great innovators of the comic strip form and is one of 16 groundbreaking cartoonists featured in America's Great Comic Strip Artists (1989, Abbeville Press) by comics historian Rick Marschall. When Polly and Her Pals was included in the Library of Congress exhibition Cartoon America, it was praised for its unique graphic style, and it is considered to be, together with Krazy Kat, the epitome of the Art Deco style in comics. It had considerable influence on many later cartoonists, including Jules Feiffer.

== Book editions ==
Cliff Sterrett's Polly and Her Pals (November 30, 1924)

A monthly Polly and Her Pals publication was published briefly in 1922 by Embee. Polly and Her Pals on the Farm was a 1934 collection from Saalfield Publishing. The earliest Polly strips were collected in 1977 by Hyperion Press (ISBN 978-0883556658), while some Sunday pages have been reprinted by Kitchen Sink Press in 1990 (ISBN 978-0924359149, nominated for Best Domestic Reprint at the Harvey Awards) and in 1991 by Remco Worldservice Books (ISBN 978-0924359156). More daily strips were reprinted by Arcadia Publications in 1990.

The French publisher Editions de l'an 2 continued the reprints started by Kitchen Sink and Remco in 2005 in French, and this edition was nominated for the 2006 Prize for Inheritance at the Angoulême International Comics Festival.

The Portuguese publisher Libri Impressi published in 2010 Dot & Dash (ISBN 9789898355034), in color and restored by Manuel Caldas (mainly known for the restoration of 1937–48 Hal Foster's Prince Valiant), with a foreword (in English, Portuguese and Spanish) by Domingos Isabelinho. It covers the entirety of the strip Dot & Dash, including the debut phase of Damon and Pythias.

IDW Publishing's "The Library of American Comics" put out an oversized, 12" x 16" full-color collection in their "Champagne Edition" size in 2010. The first volume in the series reprints almost three years of Sterrett Sunday strips, beginning with 1925 and running through 1927, along with samples from 1913 to 1924. A companion series reprinting the daily strips is also in production. The first volume covers 1933 and came out in January 2013.

In 2013, IDW also published a year of Polly and Her Pals strips (1933) as part of their LoAC Essentials series.
