= Paul Fung =

American cartoonist (1897–1944)

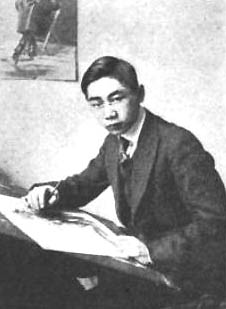
- Paul Fung at age 20
- Born: 1897; Seattle, Washington, U.S.
- Died: 1944 (aged 46–47)
- Occupation: Cartoonist
- Known for: Dumb Dora
- Relatives: Paul Fung Jr. (son)

Paul Fung (1897–1944) was an American cartoonist best known for the comic strip Dumb Dora.

== Early life ==
Fung's father was a Baptist minister, the Reverend Fung Chak, a graduate of Stanford University. Paul was born in Seattle, where his father was pastor of Seattle's Chinese Baptist mission. In China, Fung Chak was renowned as a translator of hymns and patriotic songs, Paul studied traditional Chinese art, which included painting cherry blossoms on delicate fans. But he became familiar with cartooning because his sister in Portland, Oregon mailed him Sunday comics sections. Returning to Seattle, Fung received further art training by studying the Landon School of Illustrating and Cartooning's mail order correspondence course while he was attending Franklin High School, where he drew cartoons for the school paper. In addition to drawing, he also sang and played several musical instruments.

== Sports cartoons ==
When his father died while he was in high school, Paul set out to find work. He drew cartoons which were displayed in the lobby of a Seattle vaudeville house, and he performed chalk talks at Seattle's Orpheum Theatre. In 1916, he began doing news and sports cartoons for the Seattle Post-Intelligencer. In 1919, he was profiled in Everybody's Magazine.

Fung's first original comic strip, Innocent Hing, had a short run. After working as an assistant on Billy DeBeck's Barney Google in the early 1920s, Fung moved on to do several other strips, A Guy from Grand Rapids, Bughouse Fables and Gus and Gussie. Scripted by Jack Lait, Gus and Gussie ran from April 13, 1925, to February 24, 1930, at which point Fung left Lait to do Dumb Dora.

Paul Fung's Dumb Dora (January 27, 1932)

== Dumb Dora ==
When creator Chic Young left Dumb Dora and its topper panel When Mother Was a Girl to launch Blondie, Fung became his replacement in April 1930. After two years on Dumb Dora, Fung turned it over to Bil Dwyer in 1932. Interviewed by Will Eisner, Milton Caniff recalled:

When I reached New York I called Bil Dwyer who had also worked on the Columbus Dispatch... I called him just socially and told him I was in town to say hello. I didn't know where he lived, on Christopher Street. I didn't even know where Christopher Street was. So he said, "My God, I'm glad you called! I've got a problem here. Come on down!" This was like the first night I was in town, and he had been submitting things to King Features and selling gags, by the way, to the magazines, Collier's and The New Yorker. Anyway, he had submitted a gag-type strip to King Features, and he got a call back saying that Paul Fung was being pulled off Dumb Dora and Dwyer had the assignment. Here he was suddenly with six strips and a Sunday page to do and he'd never done anything except single panels. And he was in trouble. Frank Engli was helping him. He did lettering. He later on did a strip called Looking Back, about stone age characters—very well done cartooning. But his lettering was especially good. So I went down to see them and they were laboring away at the first release. Bil was a good gag writer, but he'd never had this kind of assignment before. So he said to me, "Will you sit in on this thing and especially draw the girls?" So I laid out the first batch of stuff and again, it was not hard for me to do because I had those 11 o'clock deadlines every morning. And so then I inked the girls, and he inked the other characters; very simple drawing. Dwyer... was a very good gag man. Chic Young had originated the character and then Paul finally took over from Chic when Chic started Blondie. Paul was drawing it before Dwyer. I never did find out, by the way, why he withdrew. Maybe Fung had a fight with King Features. I don't know, and I never did ask. So we made the deadline, which was the thing that was bothering Dwyer, but in the mean time I had to go to work the next morning at eight o'clock.

During the late 1930s, Fung worked as an assistant on Cliff Sterrett's Polly and Her Pals. The Dumb Dora strip came to an end in 1934, but Fung drew the character again during the early 1940s as part of an advertising campaign for Shredded Ralston cereal.

Paul Fung was 47 when he died. His son was cartoonist Paul Fung Jr.

== Archives ==
The Paul Fung Cartoons collection at Syracuse University has 46 originals from Dumb Dora, including 10 Sunday strips and 36 daily strips, plus four originals from When Mother Was a Girl.
