= Vernon Greene =

American cartoonist (1908–1965)

Vernon Greene in 1962.

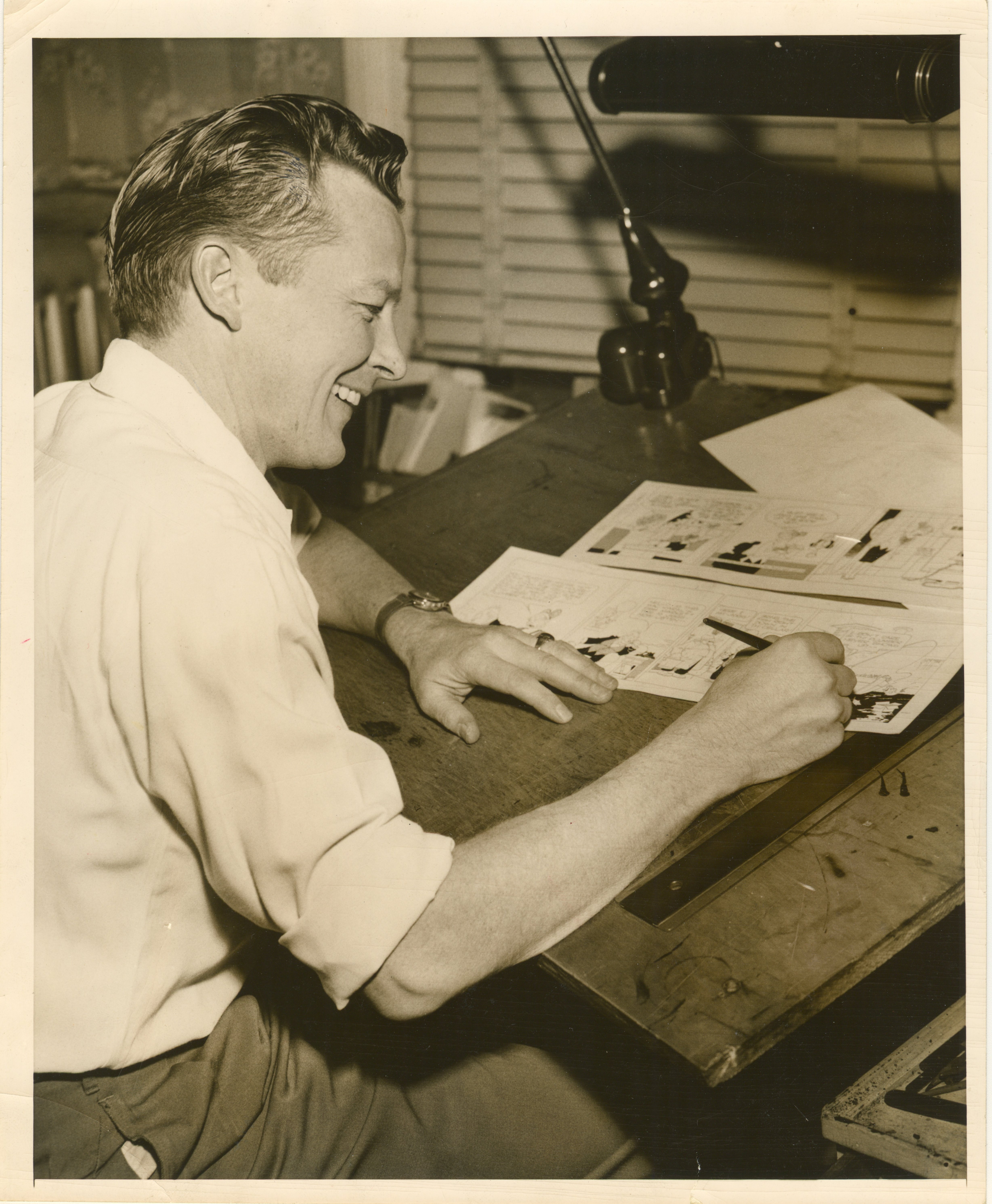
Vernon Greene at work at home studio in Wyckoff, NJ. c.1956

Vernon Van Atta Greene (September 12, 1908 – June 5, 1965) was a prolific cartoonist and illustrator who worked on several comic strips and was best known for his artwork on Bringing Up Father.

Born Vernon Van Atta Green in Battle Ground, Washington, he later added an "e" to his last name so it would be more distinctive. One of seven children of Albert and Letha Green (née Van Atta), he grew up on a 650-acre ranch where he worked as a logger and blacksmith. He attended Toledo University in the 1930s.

== Cartoon cavalcade ==
Greene started his cartoon career drawing sports cartoons for Oregon's Portland Telegram (1927–29), the Toledo Blade (1930–32) and the New York Mirror (1934–37). He was working for King Features Syndicate in 1935.

During that time, Greene was an active freelancer, creating advertising cartoons and illustrations for books and magazines. He illustrated for several Street & Smith pulps, including The Shadow, The Masked Lady and Perry Mason.

Vernon Greene's The Shadow (August 12, 1940).

== Comic strips ==
On June 17, 1940, Greene began drawing The Shadow daily comic strip, distributed by the Ledger Syndicate. He continued to draw the Shadow daily until 1942 (June 13) when it and other strips were canceled due to the growing need to run more and more war news coming in from the European and Pacific fronts during World War II. Greene served with the medical division of the Air Corps as a photographer at Kearns Air Base in Utah. For Pic magazine, he drew Mac the Medic and Charlie Conscript cartoons. After World War II, he attended Columbia University and was active in traveling with USO cartoonists tours.

For many years, he was the ghost artist on the daily version of Cliff Sterrett's Polly and Her Pals strip. After the death of George McManus in 1954, Greene took over Bringing Up Father.

== Comic books ==
He also did The Shadow comic book, beginning in 1940 as the sole artist for all issues until March 1942. For most of the remaining issues of Volume Two, he shared the artist credit with others, usually Jack Binder, until his last appearance in the issue of May 1943.

== Awards ==
Greene was an active member of the National Cartoonists Society, serving two years as their vice president. In 1964, he was awarded their Silver T-Square Award.

Greene also served as host of WRVR's syndicated radio program, The Cartoonist's Art. Greene was married to Barbara M. Bennett in 1948, and they had five children.

He lived in Wyckoff, New Jersey, from 1952 until his death from cancer in 1965.

== Archives ==
The Vernon Greene Papers at the Syracuse University Library include proofs and tear sheets from a wide variety of comic strips, original drawings, sketches, correspondence, biographical material and published material, plus taped interviews.
