= Horse Shoe, North Carolina =

- Census-designated place
- Location within North Carolina Location within the United States
- Coordinates: 35°20′32″N 82°33′25″W
- Country: United States
- State: North Carolina
- County: Henderson

Area
  - Total: 7.57 sq mi (19.61 km^{2})
  - Land: 7.46 sq mi (19.32 km^{2})
  - Water: 0.11 sq mi (0.29 km^{2})
- Elevation: 2,100 ft (640 m)

Population (2020)
  - Total: 2,430
  - Density: 325.7/sq mi (125.76/km^{2})
- Time zone: UTC-5 (Eastern (EST))
  - Summer (DST): UTC-4 (EDT)
- ZIP code: 28742
- Area code: 828
- GNIS feature ID: 2584322
- FIPS code: 37-32740

Horse Shoe is an unincorporated community and census-designated place (CDP) in Henderson County, North Carolina, United States. Its ZIP code is 28742. As of the 2020 census, Horse Shoe had a population of 2,430.

The community took its name from a nearby meander in the French Broad River.

== Geography ==
Horse Shoe is in western Henderson County, bordered to the north by the town of Mills River and to the west by unincorporated Etowah. The French Broad River runs through the center of the Horse Shoe community. U.S. Route 64 passes through Horse Shoe south of the river, and leads east 6 miles (10 km) to Hendersonville, the county seat, and southwest through Etowah 14 miles (23 km) to Brevard. Asheville is 23 miles (37 km) to the north via Mills River.

According to the U.S. Census Bureau, the Horse Shoe CDP has a total area of 7.6 square miles (19.6 km^{2}), of which 7.5 square miles (19.3 km^{2}) are land and 0.1 square miles (0.3 km^{2}), or 1.47%, are water.

== Demographics ==
Historical population
Census	Pop.	Note	%±
2020	2,430		—
U.S. Decennial Census

=== 2020 census ===
As of the 2020 census, Horse Shoe had a population of 2,430. The median age was 49.3 years. 19.7% of residents were under the age of 18 and 24.9% of residents were 65 years of age or older. For every 100 females there were 97.4 males, and for every 100 females age 18 and over there were 96.1 males age 18 and over.

29.2% of residents lived in urban areas, while 70.8% lived in rural areas.

There were 958 households in Horse Shoe, of which 29.3% had children under the age of 18 living in them. Of all households, 64.7% were married-couple households, 13.6% were households with a male householder and no spouse or partner present, and 16.8% were households with a female householder and no spouse or partner present. About 16.5% of all households were made up of individuals and 9.5% had someone living alone who was 65 years of age or older.

There were 1,035 housing units, of which 7.4% were vacant. The homeowner vacancy rate was 1.1% and the rental vacancy rate was 6.5%.

Racial composition as of the 2020 census
Race	Number	Percent
White	2,200	90.5%
Black or African American	20	0.8%
American Indian and Alaska Native	4	0.2%
Asian	7	0.3%
Native Hawaiian and Other Pacific Islander	6	0.2%
Some other race	60	2.5%
Two or more races	133	5.5%
Hispanic or Latino (of any race)	114	4.7%

== Notable people ==
- Bil Dwyer, cartoonist and humorist (1907-1987)
- Cecil Gordon, race-car driver (1941-2012)
- April Verch, Canadian fiddler, singer, and step dancer (b. 1978)
