= The Amazing Spider-Man: The Ultimate Newspaper Comics Collection =

Publication information
- Publisher: The Library of American Comics
- Format: Hardcover
- Genre: Superhero
- Publication date: June 26, 2015
- No. of issues: 5 to date
- Main character: Spider-Man

Creative team
- Written by: Stan Lee
- Artist(s): John Romita Sr. (1977–1981); Fred Kida (1981–1986); Larry Lieber (1986–?)
- Editor: Bruce Canwell

The Amazing Spider-Man: The Ultimate Newspaper Comics Collection is a series of books collecting the first 10 years (to date) of The Amazing Spider-Man newspaper comic strips by Marvel Comics, an American comic strip title which debuted on January 3, 1977. It was first syndicated by Register and Tribune Syndicate (1977–1985), later Cowles Media Company (1986), and currently King Features Syndicate (1987–onwards). The series launched in 2015 and is published by The Library of American Comics.

== Background ==
The Amazing Spider-Man newspaper comic strip has had many attempts of being collected prior to The Library of American Comics started to publish this series. In the 1980s, two trade paperbacks collecting episodes from the strip's first year; another collection was an anthology collection titled The Best of Spider-Man. The strip was also collected for a part in the magazines Comics Revue and Storyline Strips, which has selections spanned from the 1980s to the 1990s output. Marvel themselves did publish two books in the 2000s, these collecting all The Amazing Spider-Man comic strips done by Stan Lee and John Romita Sr.

How it came about to The Library of American Comics to once again publish a reprint series of the strip was thanks to the good business relationship between their owner IDW Publishing and Marvel Comics; Scott Dunbier of IDW established a good working relationship with Marvel while producing the Artist's Editions books featuring Marvel material. Further business development between the two publishers was, therefore, not a big leap to take.

The series was first announced at New York Comic Con in October 2014, together with the release date of the first volume of the series set to be in early 2015. However, it was not released until June the same year.

== Format ==
The hardcover volumes measure 11 inches × 8.5 inches (280 mm × 216 mm), have daily strips reproduced in black-and-white at three strips per page, and Sunday strips reproduced in full color, one full Sunday strip page per page. The books are designed by Dean Mullaney and edited by Bruce Canwell. Each volume collects the comic strips (dailies and Sundays) in integrated story order. Each volume entry of the book series contains approximately 700 comic strips, the equivalent to two years of an original newspaper run. The volumes have high quality acid free paper stock.

As the featured strips are Marvel property, each volume is reviewed by Marvel for approval before going into print. The books includes extras such as interviews with people involved in the making of the strip including: Jim Shooter, former Marvel Editor-in-chief; John Romita Sr., artist; Larry Lieber, artist; Stan Lee, creator and writer.

== Volumes ==
Volumes
Volume	Release date	Title	Period	Page count	ISBN
1	2015-06-26	The Amazing Spider-Man: The Ultimate Newspaper Comics Collection - Vol. 1	1977–1978	312	978-1-63140-351-4
2	2016-01-05	The Amazing Spider-Man: The Ultimate Newspaper Comics Collection - Vol. 2	1979–1981	320	978-1-63140-498-6
3	2016-08-16	The Amazing Spider-Man: The Ultimate Newspaper Comics Collection - Vol. 3	1981–1982	312	978-1-63140-651-5
4	2017-07-04	The Amazing Spider-Man: The Ultimate Newspaper Comics Collection - Vol. 4	1983–1984	324	978-1-63140-898-4
5	2019-05-14	The Amazing Spider-Man: The Ultimate Newspaper Comics Collection - Vol. 5	1985–1986	328	978-1-68405-401-5
