= Dumb Dora =

American comic strip

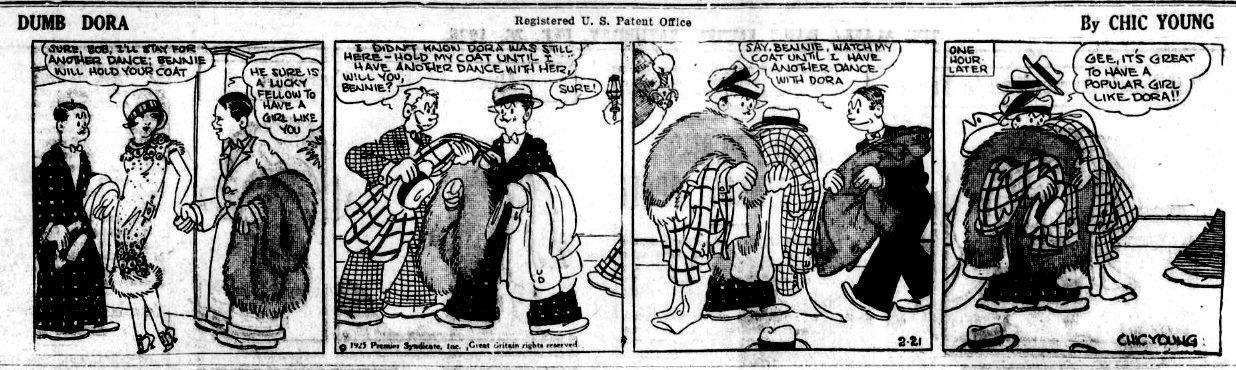
- 1925 sample of the comic strip
- Author(s): Chic Young (1924–1930); Paul Fung (1930–1932); Bil Dwyer (1932–1936)
- Current status/schedule: Concluded daily strip
- Launch date: June 25, 1924
- End date: January 1936
- Syndicate(s): Newspaper Feature Service (King Features Syndicate)
- Genre: Humor

Dumb Dora is a comic strip published from 1924 to 1936 distributed by King Features Syndicate. The term "dumb Dora" was a 1920s American slang term for a foolish woman; the strip helped popularize the term.

== Publication history ==
Dumb Dora was initially drawn by Chic Young (of later Blondie fame). After Young left the strip to create Blondie, Paul Fung took over Dumb Dora. Fung also added a topper strip to Dumb Dora, When Mother was a Girl. Bil Dwyer took over the strip in 1932, until Dumb Dora was discontinued in January 1936.

- Chic Young: June 25, 1924 – April 27, 1930
- Paul Fung: April 30, 1930 – Sept 3, 1932
- Bil Dwyer: Sept 5, 1932 – January 1936

== Story and characters ==
Although Young's Dora was uneducated, she was also capable of persuading people around her to let her get her own way. This frequently resulted in the strip ending with a character saying of Dora "She ain't so dumb!"

== In popular culture ==
According to slang glossaries of the early 1920s, the term "dumb Dora" referred to any young woman who was scatter-brained or stupid. Flappers of the 1920s were also sometimes likened to dumb Doras.

The epithet "Dumb Dora" became identified with the vaudeville act of George Burns and his wife, Gracie Allen, as did a similar slang expression for a female who was not very bright, but in a charming way: "dizzy dame." In the vaudeville era, as well as during the period from the Golden Age of Radio through the first several decades of television, female comedians were often expected to play a "Dumb Dora" or "Dizzy Dame" role, even if, in real life, they were very intelligent. A good example of this dichotomy was Lucille Ball.

Although the Dumb Dora comic strip was discontinued in 1935, the TV game show Match Game occasionally alluded to the strip, asking those watching in the studio to shout in unison, "How dumb is she?" (borrowing from one routine from The Tonight Show).
