= The Amazing Spider-Man (comic strip) =

1977–2019 daily comic strip

- Cover art of the first collection of strips
- Author(s): Stan Lee; Roy Thomas (uncredited, ghost writer)
- Illustrator(s): John Romita Sr. (1977–1981); Fred Kida (1981–1986); Larry Lieber (1986–2018); Alex Saviuk (2018–2019)
- Current status/schedule: Ended
- Launch date: January 3, 1977
- End date: March 23, 2019
- Syndicate(s): Register and Tribune Syndicate (1977–1985); Cowles Media Company (1986); King Features Syndicate (1987–2019)
- Publisher: Marvel Comics
- Genre: Superhero

The Amazing Spider-Man is a daily comic strip featuring the character Spider-Man. It was syndicated from 1977 to 2019, with the strip going into reruns afterwards. It is a dramatic, soap opera-style strip with story arcs which typically run for 8 to 12 weeks. While the strip uses many of the same characters as the Spider-Man comic book, the storylines are nearly all originals and do not share the same continuity.

== History ==
A Spider-Man comic strip was first proposed in 1970. Two weeks' worth of strips were written by Spider-Man co-creator Stan Lee and illustrated by John Romita Sr., but the series was never picked up. These strips were then published in Marvelmania Magazine #3 and #4. Later it was reprinted in the program for the 1975 Mighty Marvel Comic Convention.

Years later Spider-Man publisher Marvel Comics tried again, and the daily newspaper comic strip The Amazing Spider-Man debuted on January 3, 1977. Produced by Marvel and syndicated by the Register and Tribune Syndicate through 1985, Cowles Media Company in 1986, and King Features Syndicate after 1987, the comic strip was successful in an era with few serialized adventure strips. The strip slowly grew in circulation. Initially the creative team was again Lee and Romita. After four years Romita left the strip, but Stan Lee remained the credited writer of the strip's entire run of original material. Though renowned for his use of the Marvel method, Lee wrote full scripts for the comic strip.

Stan Lee's brother, Larry Lieber, briefly illustrated the strip but found he could not keep up with the schedule, and in August 1981 Fred Kida took on the assignment. Unlike most artists who worked on The Amazing Spider-Man, Kida found that drawing Spider-Man in daily strip form did not present any challenges. He left in July 1986, later commenting that he found the strip's violence to be excessive. After a brief stint by Dan Barry, Lee asked his brother if he wanted to give it another try. This time Larry Lieber was able to keep up with the schedule, and he drew the daily strip for the following 32 years. The Amazing Spider-Man also employed inkers and separate artists for the Sunday version of the strip. From 1997 until the strip ceased running new material in 2019, Alex Saviuk inked the daily strips and penciled the Sunday strips. After Lieber retired in 2018, Saviuk took over pencilling the daily strip as well. In addition, numerous ghost artists contributed to the strip over the years.

Story arcs in the newspaper strip have varied in length (one storyline ran for seven months), but most last eight to 12 weeks. While the strip mostly features the same characters as the comic book, the storylines were nearly all originals and did not share the same continuity. As of 2010, there had only been three story arcs featured in both the strip and the comic book: "The Wedding!" (1987), "The Mutant Agenda" (1993–1994), and "Spider-Man: Brand New Day" (2008). In the case of "Brand New Day", reader reaction to the continuity change ("Brand New Day" establishes that the marriage between lead characters Peter Parker and Mary Jane Watson never happened) was so negative that Lee opted to reveal the entire story had been a bad dream. Many characters of the strip have never appeared in other media, including the Rattler, the Protector, and Carole Jennings.

Guest stars in the newspaper strip have included Wolverine, Daredevil, and Doctor Strange. Villains included Doctor Doom, Kraven the Hunter, the Rhino and Mysterio. One storyline featuring the Sandman referenced the events of the 2007 feature film Spider-Man 3.

Following the death of Stan Lee in November 2018, the strip continued to be published with his name still credited. (Long-time Marvel comics writer Roy Thomas had been plotting and/or ghost writing the strip under Lee's supervision since 2000.) In March 2019 it was announced the strip would be undergoing creative changes; ostensibly, new content was "temporarily" being put on hold, to be replaced with reprints of previous adventures. Saviuk and Thomas both announced their departures from the strip, and no announcement was made about any new writer or artist taking over the production of new material.

On March 23, 2019, the final original newspaper Amazing Spider-Man strip was published. All subsequently published strips have been reprints. Distribution of the reprints ended on October 21, 2023, replaced by a revival of Flash Gordon.

== Reprints ==
Pocket Books released two paperbacks reprinting stories from the strip, with color added, in 1980.

In 1991, the story arc "The Wedding!" was reprinted in a trade paperback which also includes the comic book version of the story.

Panini Publishing UK published The Daily Adventures of the Amazing Spider-Man in the United Kingdom in 2007. The black-and-white trade paperback collection reprints the first two years of the newspaper strip.

Marvel has published two hardcover volumes of newspaper strips, reprinting stories from 1977-1980. The first, Spider-Man Newspaper Strips Volume 1, was published in 2009, reprinting stories by Stan Lee and John Romita Sr. Spider-Man Newspaper Strips Volume 2 was published in 2011, reprinting stories by Lee, Romita, and Larry Lieber. In 2014, both volumes were published in softcover editions.

Starting in 2015, Marvel and IDW Publishing began co-publishing hardcover reprints from the strip's beginning in a series called The Amazing Spider-Man: The Ultimate Newspaper Comics Collection, published by the IDW imprint, The Library of American Comics. Each volume (1-5) is subtitled for the years covered in the individual book.

In 2025, Clover Press announced a new partnership with Marvel for new The Amazing Spider-Man Newspaper Strip softcover collections covering one year from 1977 onwards per volume in chronological order. First available through a crowdfunding campaign, the books were also released individually in bookstores starting in 2026. These reprints also include the two Pocket Books color reprints from 1980, and the original unsolicited 1970 strips as a mini hardcover titled "The Original Newspaper Strips by Stan Lee and John Romita".

The comic strip world is designated as its own universe within Marvel's multiverse, Earth-77013, and is featured in the "Spider-Verse" comic storyline.

== See also ==
- 1977 in comics
