= National Airlines Flight 470 =

1953 aviation accident

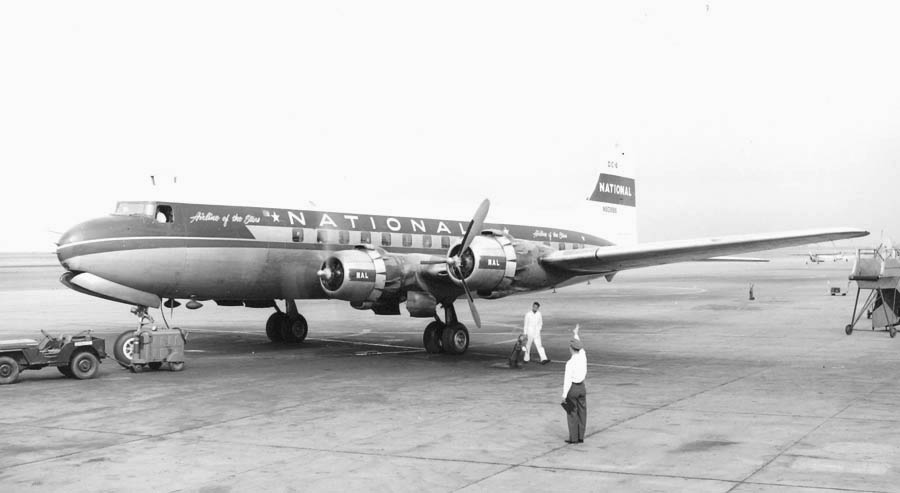
- National DC-6 similar to the one involved

Accident
- Date: February 14, 1953
- Summary: Turbulence, in-flight breakup
- Site: Gulf of Mexico, off Fort Morgan, Alabama; 30°10′25″N 87°57′10″W

Aircraft
- Aircraft type: Douglas DC-6
- Operator: National Airlines
- Registration: N90893
- Flight origin: Miami International Airport, Miami, Florida
- Stopover: Tampa International Airport, Tampa, Florida
- Destination: Moisant Field, New Orleans, Louisiana
- Occupants: 46
- Passengers: 41
- Crew: 5
- Fatalities: 46
- Survivors: 0

National Airlines Flight 470 was a regularly scheduled flight between Tampa and New Orleans that crashed on February 14, 1953 after encountering severe turbulence. The crash marked the deadliest accident in the history of National Airlines, killing 46 (5 crew and 41 passengers), among them the widow of the cartoonist Billy DeBeck: Mary Bergman.

== Events ==
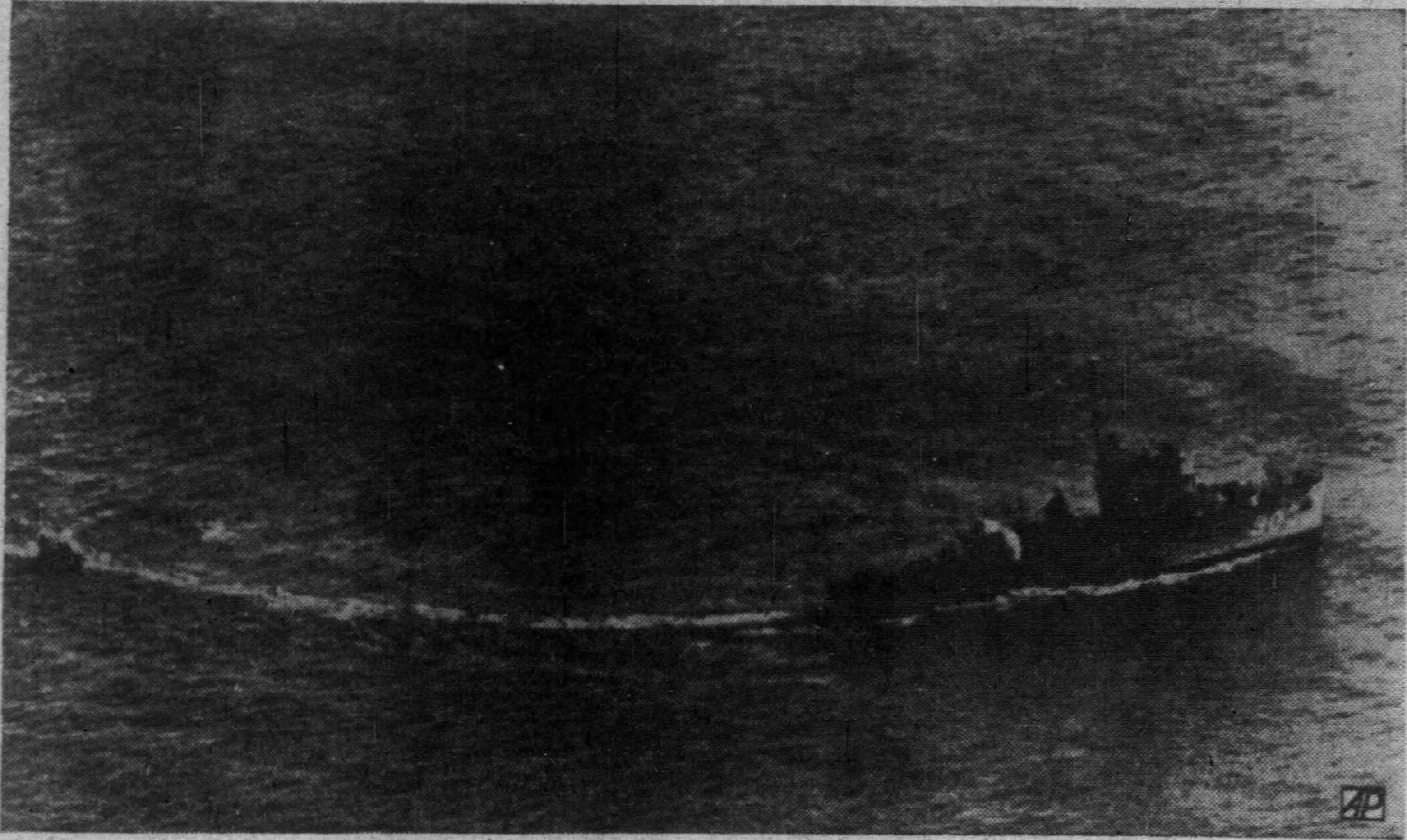
Crash site of the flight in the Gulf of Mexico

The Douglas DC-6, registered N90893, crashed into the Gulf of Mexico 20 miles (32 km) off Mobile Point en route to New Orleans. The USCGC Blackthorn assisted in search and recovery operations. National Airlines did not maintain its own meteorology department, as was standard among airlines at the time, and its pilots were not informed of the strength of the storm into which they were flying.
