= Superman (comic strip) =

American comic strip by Jerry Siegel and Joe Shuster

- Ad announcing the beginning of the Superman strip.
- Author: Jerry Siegel
- Illustrator: Joe Shuster
- Current status/schedule: Concluded Daily & Sunday
- Launch date: January 16, 1939
- End date: May 1966
- Syndicate(s): McClure Syndicate
- Publisher: National Comics Publications
- Genre: Superhero

Superman was a daily newspaper comic strip which began on January 16, 1939, and a separate Sunday strip was added on November 5, 1939. These strips ran continuously until May 1966. In 1941, the McClure Syndicate had placed the strip in hundreds of newspapers. At its peak, the strip, featuring Superman, was in over 300 daily newspapers and 90 Sunday papers, with a readership of over 20 million. A spin-off, Lois Lane, Girl Reporter, ran irregularly between 1943 and 1944.

During the National Comics Publications v. Fawcett Publications court case, the District Court ruled that McClure Syndicate failed to place the copyright notice on some of the strips and thus those strips are in the public domain.

== Original storylines ==
First Superman Sunday strip (November 5, 1939).

The daily strip was host to many storylines, unique from the regular Superman comic series. The early years consisted of Siegel-era Superman stories, many of which have yet to be republished. The strips contained the first appearance of a bald Lex Luthor, the first appearance of Mr. Mxyzptlk and of Superman's parents Jor-El and Lara. It also included the first instance in comics of Superman changing costume in a telephone booth. Other stories of note include Superman saving Santa Claus from the Nazis, World War II-era stories of Superman protecting the American home front, and Clark Kent marrying Lois Lane. The artwork includes runs by famed Superman artists Wayne Boring and Curt Swan.

Mr. Mxyzptlk was not created for, but first published in the Superman daily strip. The character was first created to appear in the story "The Mysterious Mr. Mxyztplk" written by Jerry Siegel and drawn by Ira Yarborough. Due to the publishing lag time, the daily strip team of writer Whitney Ellsworth and artist Wayne Boring saw the character and were able to use him first in the daily strip story "The Mischievous Mr. Mxyzptlk" published from February 21 to July 19, 1944. "The Mysterious Mr. Mxyzptlk" was published the comic book Superman #30 in September 1944.

Superman appeared in the newspapers again in 1978, with the newspaper strip The World's Greatest Superheroes, which was retitled in his name in 1982 and lasted until 1985. Between these two comic strip series, Superman appeared in almost 12,000 unique newspaper strips.

== Writers and artists ==
Advertisement for Superman comic strip.

Over the years, there have been a number of different writers and artists on the Superman newspaper strips. Originally, the strip was drawn by Joe Shuster. As Superman became more and more popular and the workload kept increasing, Shuster turned over many duties to his studio assistants. Paul Cassidy was the first in a line of ghost artists on the strip and took over the inking and detail work in 1939. In September 1940, Leo Nowak replaced Cassidy on the strip. Other assistants during this time included Dennis Neville, John Sikela (beginning in 1940), Ed Dobrotka (beginning in 1941), Paul J. Lauretta, and Jack Burnley (beginning in 1941). Sikela and Dobrotka often traded penciling and inking duties between each other. Lauretta primarily inked and did backgrounds on the strips. Burnley eventually left to work on his own comic book, Starman, but did return to pencil the Superman Sundays in 1943. The Superman strips during this early period of shop work was a team effort with multiple artists working on different parts of the same strip.

This early period ended with the start of World War II. Jerry Siegel, the main writer, was drafted in 1943. Early that same year, Leo Nowak and John Sikela were drafted as well. In 1943, Stan Kaye took over the inking. Wayne Boring, who had been another early assistant to Joe Shuster, left the Shuster studio in 1942 to directly draw the daily strip for DC. Boring and Kaye dominated the daily strip's artwork throughout most of the 1940s. The two also provided art for the Sunday strip between 1940 and 1966.

In the middle of 1949, Win Mortimer took over the daily strip from Boring. Stan Kaye continued inking Mortimer's work until Kaye temporarily left, and Mortimer inked his own work until he left DC in 1956 to publish his David Crane strip. Curt Swan took over the daily strip on June 18, 1956, along with Stan Kaye. Swan continued on the strip until November 12, 1960.

As for the stories in the Superman strips, Jerry Siegel originally wrote them until he was drafted in 1943. Whitney Ellsworth, who had begun on the strip in 1941, continued until 1945. Jack Schiff began his writing on the strip in 1942 and worked on the strip off and on until 1962.

Alvin Schwartz first started writing for the Superman strip in October 1944. Between 1947 and 1951, Schwartz was the only writer on the Superman strip, and he continued on the strip until 1958. Bill Woolfolk wrote one story for the dailies in 1953.

In 1959, Bill Finger started scripting stories, and he worked through the series' end in 1966. During this final period, Jerry Siegel resumed his duties writing some stories.

== Spin-off ==
McClure Syndicate, concerned and fearing newspapers would cancel the popular Superman strip if it could not appear regularly and on time, appealed to DC to instead create a spin-off strip, Lois Lane, Girl Reporter, for McClure to use as a filler material for newspaper syndication. Lois Lane accompanied the Superman Sunday strip in the Cleveland Plain Dealer, running irregularly between October 24, 1943, and February 27, 1944; a total of twelve Lois Lane topper strips were produced.

== Reprints ==
In 2013, The Library of American Comics started to collect all the Superman comic strips, daily and Sundays, originally published between 1943 and 1966, so far producing thirteen volumes of hardcover collections; Kitchen Sink Press and later Sterling Publishing had already published the 1939-1942 years in two hardcover books, one each for the Sundays and the dailies.

As of 2024, no imprint has yet to publish the Superman daily strips from 1949-1959 as no complete set of viable proofs, or private collections, of those years can be found. If and when found, this run would likely require another three or four additional volumes to be produced.
