= Dynamic Man (Dynamic Publications) =

Publication information
- Publisher: Dynamic Publications; Dynamite Entertainment
- First appearance: Dynamic Comics #1 (July 1941)

In-story information
- Alter ego: Bert McQuade
- Abilities: Superhuman strength Flight

Dynamic Man is a android superhero published in comics by Dynamic Publications, one of Harry "A" Chesler's imprints. He has numerous similarities to an earlier character of the same name published by Timely Comics, including a similar origin story and powers. It is unclear to what extent this character was inspired by the earlier Dynamic Man.

He appeared in Dynamic Comics issues #1–3 and #8–24 (1941–48).

== Fictional character biography ==
Dynamic Man was an android created by the brilliant scientist Dr. Moore to battle the evil magician the Yellow Spot. Moore was killed just as his creation reached completion. Dynamic Man then began his crime fighting career, and soon took the identity of Bert McQuade, a high school football coach recently killed. Bert's younger brother Ricky became his sidekick, Dynamic Boy. His powers, and Dynamic Boy's, included flight and super strength. Their enemies included the Yellow Spot, the Sea Horror and a band of kidnapping Gypsies. In issue #14 (April 1945), Dynamic Man suddenly had a secret identity, school athletic coach Bert McQuade.

=== Project Superpowers ===
Dynamic Man appears in the mini-series Project Superpowers. He is shown to be the head of the "Dynamic Family" which consist of him, Dynamic Boy (now also an android), an unnamed female android and an army of androids. They are shown to be a secret power behind the world. Originally, the creative team mistakenly named this incarnation of Dynamic Man "Curt Cowan", the alias of the Timely Comics Dynamic Man. The error was corrected, however, and the character was identified as "Bert McQuade" from issue #2 onwards.
