= Alvin Schwartz (comics) =

American comic book writer

Alvin Stanley Schwartz
- Born: November 17, 1916 New York City, New York
- Died: October 28, 2011 (aged 94) Chesterville, Ontario
- Awards: Bill Finger Award for Excellence in Comic Book Writing

Alvin Stanley Schwartz (November 17, 1916 – October 28, 2011) was an American comic book writer best known for his Batman and Superman stories. He was also a novelist, poet, and essayist.

== Biography ==
=== Early life and career ===
Alvin Schwartz debuted in comics with an issue of Fairy Tale Parade in 1939. He then wrote extensively for Sheldon Mayer at All-American Publications and then for National Comics, two of the three companies that merged to form DC Comics.

=== Golden Age of comics books ===
Schwartz wrote his first Batman story in 1942, expanding into the Batman newspaper comic strip in August 1944 and the Superman strip two months later. Through 1952, he scripted for most of the company's newspaper strips. For rival Fawcett Comics, he wrote stories for Superman's chief competitor Captain Marvel.

=== 1950s ===
Until ending his association with DC in 1958, Schwartz contributed comic-book scripts for such superheroes as Aquaman, Wonder Woman, the Flash, Green Lantern, the Newsboy Legion, Vigilante, Slam Bradley, and Tomahawk. He also wrote comic books such as A Date With Judy, Buzzy, and House of Mystery. Among Schwartz's contributions to Superman was writing the first tale of Bizarro, denizen of an opposite, interdimensional world where "hello" means "goodbye", and citizens do good by doing bad. He wrote World's Finest Comics #71 (July 1954), the issue that began featuring Superman and Batman in the same story together.

Schwartz left DC after clashing repeatedly with the new Superman-line editor Mort Weisinger.

=== Corporate work ===
After leaving DC, Schwartz went into corporate market research and helped develop such techniques as psychographics and typological identification. As research director for Dr. Ernst Dichter's Institute for Motivational Research, he provided structural and marketing advice to corporations such as General Motors and General Foods. He later joined the advisory committee of the American Association of Advertising Agencies.

=== Other writing ===
Schwartz wrote three novels for Arco Press, one of which, the detective story Sword of Desire, won praise for its takeoff on Wilhelm Reich's orgone therapy, a popular psychotherapeutic technique used during the 1940s and 1950s. His proto-Beat novel The Blowtop was published by Dial Press in 1948. Under the title Le Cinglé, it became a best-seller in France.

In 1968, Schwartz moved to Canada, where he wrote documentaries and docudramas for the National Film Board of Canada for nearly 20 years, and created several economic and social studies for the Government of Canada. Additionally, Schwartz wrote and lectured on superheroes, and received a Canada Council Grant for a study on religious symbolism in popular culture, using Superman as a springboard.

=== Later life and career ===
In 1997, Schwartz published an autobiography titled An Unlikely Prophet. In it, he wrote that Superman had attained the status of a tulpa, an entity that according to Buddhist beliefs attains reality solely by the act of imagination. Schwartz claimed he had actually met the superhero in a New York cab. In the mid-2000s, Schwartz wrote a weekly web column.

Schwartz and his wife lived in the rural village of Chesterville near Ottawa, Ontario, Canada. He died in 2011 of heart-related complications.

== Awards ==
Schwartz and writer-editor Harvey Kurtzman were awarded the 2006 Bill Finger Award for Excellence in Comic Book Writing.

== Bibliography ==
- The Blowtop (1948) ISBN 1-58754-007-X
- Sword of Desire (Arco 1952) under pseudonym Robert W. Tracy
- An Unlikely Prophet (1997) ISBN 0-9659521-2-6
- A Gathering of Selves (2006) ISBN 1-59477-109-X
