= Billy DeBeck =

American cartoonist (1890–1942)

- Billy DeBeck with Barney Google and Spark Plug
- Born: April 15, 1890 Chicago, Illinois, U.S.
- Died: November 11, 1942 (aged 52) New York City, U.S.
- Area: Cartoonist
- Notable works: Barney Google
- Collaborators: Paul Fung, Fred Lasswell

William Morgan DeBeck (April 15, 1890 – November 11, 1942) was an American cartoonist. He is most famous as the creator of the comic strip Barney Google, later retitled Barney Google and Snuffy Smith. The strip was especially popular in the 1920s and 1930s, and featured a number of well-known characters, including the title character, Bunky, Snuffy Smith, and Spark Plug the race horse. Spark Plug was a merchandising phenomenon, and has been called the Snoopy of the 1920s.

DeBeck drew with a scratchy line in a "big-foot" style, in which characters had giant feet and bulbous noses. His strips often reflected his love of sports. In 1946, the National Cartoonists Society inaugurated the Billy DeBeck Memorial Awards (or the Barney Awards), which became the Reuben Award in 1954.

== Life and career ==
=== Early life ===
William Morgan DeBeck was born on April 15, 1890, on the South Side of Chicago, where his father, Louis DeBeck, was a newspaperman employed by the Swift Company. The elder DeBeck was of French descent, and the name DeBeck was originally spelled DeBecque. His mother, Jessie Lee Morgan, was of Irish and Welsh descent, and had lived on a farm and was a schoolteacher.

=== Early career ===
After graduating from Hyde Park High School in 1908, DeBeck attended the Chicago Academy of Fine Arts. He sold cartoon drawings during this time to finance himself, at first in 1908 for the Chicago Daily News. His caricatures of models drew the attention of his fellow students, and though he had intended to become a painter in the Flemish tradition, he quit the Academy after two years after he got a cartooning job with the weekly paper Show World in 1910. His cartoons showed the influence of John T. McCutcheon and Clare Briggs, whom he had admired in his youth; he also had the skill to draw in the more fastidiously cross-hatched style of a Charles Dana Gibson, copies of whose drawings he sold as originals.

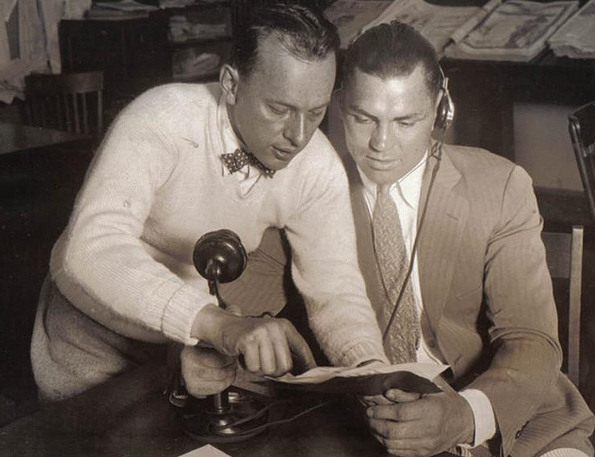
DeBeck with boxing heavyweight champion Jack Dempsey in 1919.

DeBeck soon left Show World for better opportunities at Youngstown Telegram in Ohio as an editorial cartoonist, then again at the Pittsburgh Gazette-Time in late August 1912. He later contributed cartoons to the New York City humor magazines Life and Judge. While living in Pittsburgh, he traveled to New York to show comic strip samples to Arthur Brisbane, an editor working for William Randolph Hearst's newspaper empire; Brisbane rejected the work. DeBeck later stated the examples "were terrible" as he "had been doing political cartoons for the Pittsburgh Gazette, and the comics were new" to him. He returned to Youngstown and married Marion Louise Shields there in 1914.

In May 1915, DeBeck and a partner named Carter launched a newspaper syndicate and correspondence cartooning course; DeBeck's advice to his correspondence students was: "First learn how to draw—then go to a good art school and get a firm foundation in the arts". The school was not a success, and DeBeck returned to Chicago and joined the Chicago Herald in December 1915. He worked on a strip called Finn an' Haddie for the Adams Newspaper Service on the side. On December 9, immediately after starting at the Herald, he began a strip called Married Life that so caught the attention of Hearst; legend says that, to acquire DeBeck, Hearst bought the Herald and merged it with the Chicago Examiner, as DeBeck had refused to join the Hearst empire after the Examiner raised his monthly salary from $35 to $200. DeBeck's creations were first adapted to film when an animated version of Married Life appeared in a Seattle Sunday Times newsreel in 1917. DeBeck created a number of other features, especially for the sports section, while his antics made him something of a local celebrity.

=== Barney Google ===
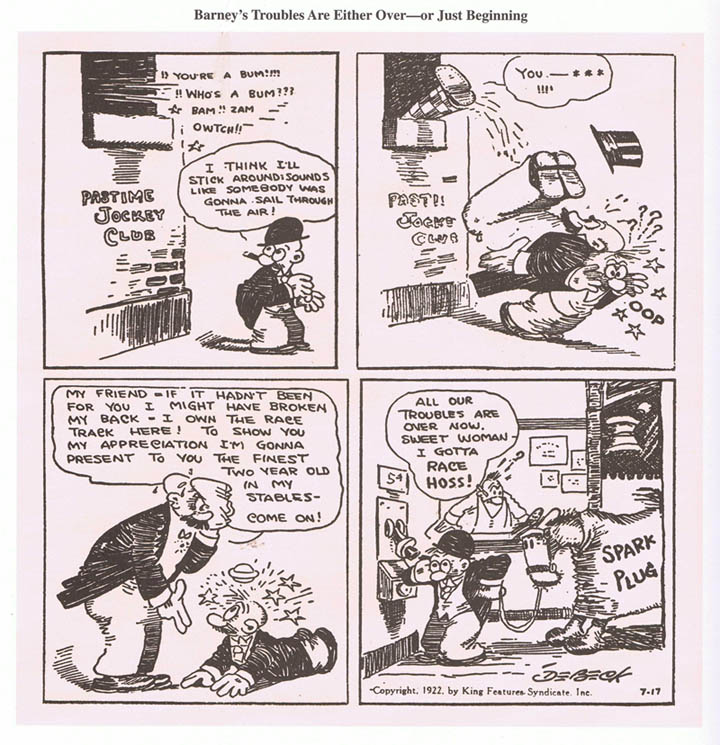
DeBeck introduced the popular race horse Spark Plug on July 17, 1922.

On June 17, 1919, a new comic strip by DeBeck in the vein of Married Life debuted on the sports page; Take Barney Google, For Instance. It differed in that it was about a henpecked, sports-obsessed husband and his travails defying his wife. Google was interested in non-fictional sports stories, such as the heavyweight championship bout between Jess Willard and Jack Dempsey. It was not long before DeBeck refigured the tall, thin Google into the short, squat character he was to be remembered as, and the title too was soon shortened to Barney Google. It was not popular until DeBeck had Google acquire a race horse named Spark Plug (nicknamed "Sparky") in a strip dated July 17, 1922. The dilapidated, blanket-covered horse became such a marketing and merchandising phenomenon that the character has been called the Snoopy of the 1920s—toys, balloons, and games were among the popular items adorned with Sparky's image. When DeBeck introduced the horse, he also introduced a little-used technique into the strip: continuity. Barney Google went from being a gag-a-day strip to one in which both humor and suspense kept readers coming back each day, as Google desperately tried to get his horse to win a race. The sequence in which Spark Plug was introduced into the strip was republished in the October 1922 issue of Comic Monthly—likely the earliest newsstand comics periodical.

DeBeck kept readers on the edges of their seats with uncertain suspense: sometimes Spark Plug actually won a race. While DeBeck resisted at first, Hearst demanded a pretty girl be introduced into the strip. DeBeck brought in Sweet Mama, which initially created a stir, and certain papers dropped the strip, but after the phrase swept the nation, the strip's popularity only increased. Over the years, DeBeck was credited with introducing more neologisms and catchphrases, such as "heebie-jeebies", "horsefeathers", "balls of fire" and "time's a-wastin'". In 1923, Billy Rose penned a Tin Pan Alley pop hit called "Barney Google (with the Goo-Goo-Googly Eyes)". A series of Barney Google live-action films starring Barney Hellum appeared in 1928 and 1929.

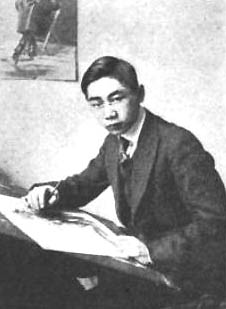
DeBeck's assistant Paul Fung (pictured) took over Barney Google's topper Bughouse Fables in the 1920s.

DeBeck had included a topper called Bughouse Fables (signed "Barney Google)" with his main strip since 1921, though he soon handed it off to assistant Paul Fung. On May 16, 1926, he replaced Bughouse Fables with Parlor, Bedroom & Sink Starring Bunky, a strip that was popular enough on its own to survive until 1948.

According to later Barney Google and Snuffy Smith scripter Brian Walker, DeBeck had become "one of the highest-paid cartoonists in America" at this point. In the early 1920s, DeBeck moved to Riverside Drive in New York City, and in 1927 remarried Mary Louise Dunne. The couple spent the next two years in Europe, after which they settled down again in New York. DeBeck's active lifestyle sometimes caused him to miss deadlines. He enjoyed traveling, deep sea fishing, golf and playing bridge. As a golfer since 1916, DeBeck spent time on courses with such notables as Harold Lloyd, Walter Huston, Rube Goldberg, Fontaine Fox, Clarence Budington Kelland and bridge authority P. Hal Sims. He was also acquainted with such celebrities as Babe Ruth, Lowell Thomas and Damon Runyon. His best friend was the cartoonist Frank Willard, who also attended the Chicago Academy of Fine Arts.

=== Snuffy Smith ===
Barney Google's popularity persisted into the Depression era; in 1933, Fortune magazine reported DeBeck's weekly earnings at $1200. In the spring of 1933, DeBeck hired 17-year-old Fred Lasswell as an assistant after seeing a big poster of Lasswell's funny characters rushing to the Tampa Chamber of Commerce Jamboree. DeBeck was a refined city gentleman, an avid golfer, world traveler, and bon vivant. He wanted to create a rural down-home character with whom depression-era audiences could relate. He needed some help. Fred Lasswell was a confirmed hayseed from the sticks with much kinfolk wisdom, make-do humor, a talent for drawing clean lines and blending funny images with text. Lasswell recalls his "big tour with Billy" and the copious notes DeBeck took of Hillbilly phrases, while Lasswell drew sketches of backwoods characters, critters and scenes he already knew. The result became comic strip history in 1934, when Snuffy Smith met Barney Google and sales of the comic strip, soon to become Barney Google and Snuffy Smith, soared. Over the next seven years, Lasswell became the son DeBeck never had. DeBeck sent him to apprentice with some of the great illustrators, to study at the Art Students League in New York, and to walk the streets of the city with a sketchbook to capture the movement, personalities and situations he saw. After eight years of mentoring Lasswell, DeBeck died and Lasswell took over his mentor's strip. Under Lasswell Barney Google and Snuffy Smith has become the longest continuously produced comic strip in American's newspaper history.

DeBeck gained a growing interest into the culture of Appalachia in the 1930s and amassed a library on the subject that he later donated to Virginia Commonwealth University. Among the books he admired were those featuring Sut Lovingood by George Washington Harris; inside Sut Lovingood Yarns (1867) DeBeck produced his first sketch of Snuffy Smith, a character that grew from talking with and sketching the Appalachian hillbilly locals. Just as the strip's circulation was starting to flag, DeBeck introduced Snuffy in a storyline in which Barney inherited an estate in the mountains of North Carolina. After dodging the ornery hillbilly's bullets, the two became fast friends. The strip was eventually renamed Barney Google and Snuffy Smith, and Snuffy would take over from Barney Google as the central character. Lasswell, with his own country roots, provided much of the inspiration for Snuffy and his Appalachian environment. Especially, he provided a source for the locals' dialect. Hillbilly culture enjoyed much popularity in the 1930s; Snuffy Smith appeared the same year as Al Capp's Li'l Abner. By 1940, DeBeck's strip appeared in 210 newspapers with a combined circulation of ten million.

Screen Gems produced four full-color animated Barney Google and Snuffy Smith shorts in 1935. The series had two more live-action adaptations in 1942: Bud Duncan starred as Snuffy Smith in Private Snuffy Smith and co-starred with Cliff Nazarro as Barney Google in Hillbilly Blitzkrieg.

=== Later life and death ===
DeBeck had a studio apartment on Park Avenue in New York, and homes in Great Neck in New York and St. Petersburg in Florida. In the early 1940s, he developed cancer and found it increasingly difficult to work. Sensing his end was near, he made a special trip to see Marian Shields. His last signed daily strip appeared July 4, 1942, and his last Sunday the following August 2. With Lasswell contributing to the war effort, the strip continued under an assistant, Joe Musial. On November 11, 1942, DeBeck died at the age of 52 in New York City, with his wife at his bedside. They had no children. Barney Google appeared in 206 newspapers at the time, and Musial continued the strip until Lasswell took it on full-time in 1945. Over time, Barney faded from the strip, and the title contracted to Snuffy Smith.

In 1943, Mary DeBeck donated to the Ringling School of Art all of her husband's art supplies, including drawing tables, reams of drawing paper, hundreds of colored pencils, lamps, drawing boards, inks, drawing pens, artist smocks, etching plates, and an etching press. She remarried, and died February 14, 1953, aboard National Airlines Flight 470, a DC-6 that fell into the Gulf of Mexico during a thunderstorm on a flight from Tampa to New Orleans.

== Style ==
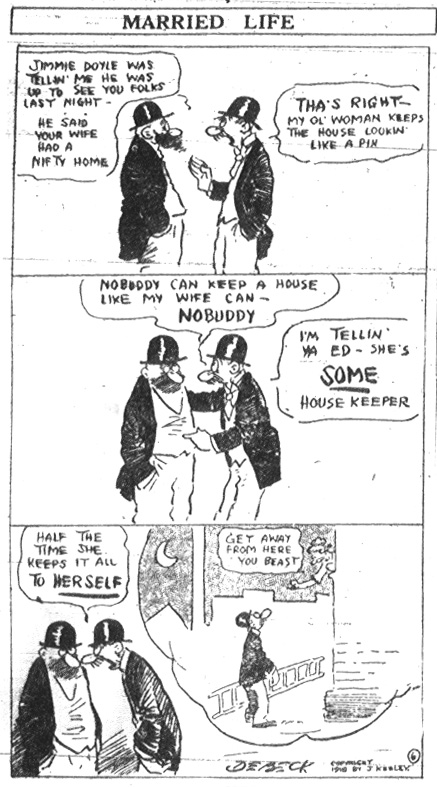
Married Life an early hit for DeBeck, landed him in the Hearst empire.

DeBeck's drawing style falls in the "big-foot" tradition of American comic strips such as The Katzenjammer Kids, Hägar the Horrible, and Robert Crumb. It had a scratchy line and characters with bulbous noses and giant feet. Though he often procrastinated, DeBeck could work quickly and make it just in time for his deadlines.

DeBeck put Barney Google through great changes throughout his twenty-three-year run on the strip, changing situations and characters frequently. The storylines reflected the outlook of the 1920s boom years, the Great Depression, and World War II.

== Legacy ==
DeBeck's main strip continued in the hands of Fred Lasswell long after its creator's death. The number of newspaper that carried it had been flagging in the years leading to DeBeck's passing, partly because the hillbilly dialect in the dialogue was difficult to read for many. The syndicate informed Lasswell that if many more newspapers dropped the strip, it would be canceled. Lasswell refocused on Snuffy Smith, dropped much of the dialect, and moved away from continuity to a gag-a-day format. The strip's popularity once again increased, and by 1989 it was running in 900 newspapers in 21 countries. It has continued in different hands since Lasswell's death in 2001.

Debeck's hillbilly depictions, though stereotyped and distorted, had a higher degree of accuracy than those of Al Capp or other contemporary cartoonists, and painted hillbillies in a better light. DeBeck included authentic expressions such as "plime-blank" ("exactly") and "a lavish of" ("a lot of"), and included explanations of dialect unfamiliar to his readers. Some such as country singer Roy Acuff objected that the strip perpetuated stereotypes of hillbilly culture.

DeBeck is credited with introducing or popularizing a number of neologisms and catchphrases via Barney Google, including "heebie-jeebies", "horsefeathers", "hotsy totsy", "balls of fire", "time's a-wastin'", "touched in the head", and "bodacious".

Charles M. Schulz, creator of the Peanuts comic strip, was nicknamed "Sparky" after DeBeck's racehorse character, and DeBeck's drawing style has been an influence on contemporary cartooning and popular culture, and on such later cartoonists as Robert Crumb and Bobby London. The Barney Google Sunday page for September 18, 1938, was placed in the time capsule at the 1939 World's Fair.

The National Cartoonists Society's annual award was originally named the Billy DeBeck Memorial Award. Created by Mary DeBeck Bergman in 1946, these were known as the Barney Awards. She also made the annual presentation of engraved silver cigarette cases, with DeBeck's characters etched on the cover, to the winners (Milton Caniff, Al Capp, Chic Young, Alex Raymond, Roy Crane, Walt Kelly, Hank Ketcham and Mort Walker). In 1954, after her death, the DeBeck Award was renamed the Reuben Award after Rube Goldberg, and all of the earlier winners were re-awarded Reuben statuettes.

== List of comic strips ==
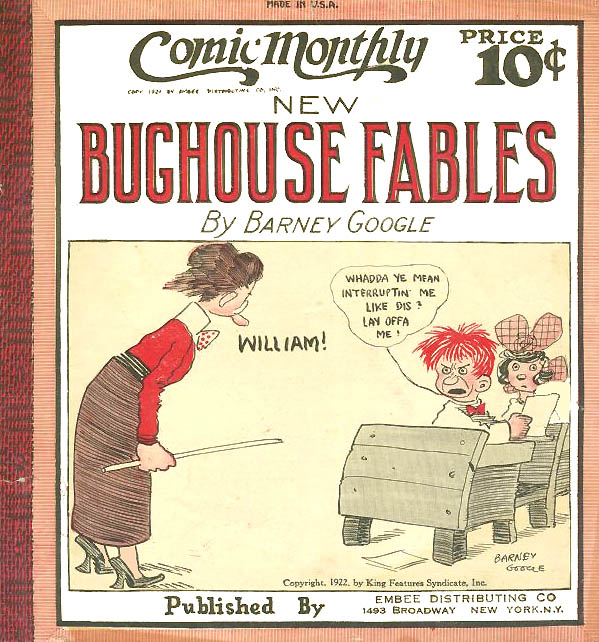
Billy DeBeck used Barney Google as a byline on the earliest Bughouse Fables panels.

- Finn an' Haddie (1916)
- Married Life (1916)
- Olie Moses and Mara, Inc
- Take Barney Google, F'rinstance (1919), later Barney Google, then Barney Google and Snuffy Smith
- Bughouse Fables, soon taken over by DeBeck's assistant, Paul Fung
- Parlor, Bedroom & Sink (1926), later Bunky
