= Wayne Boring =

American comic book artist

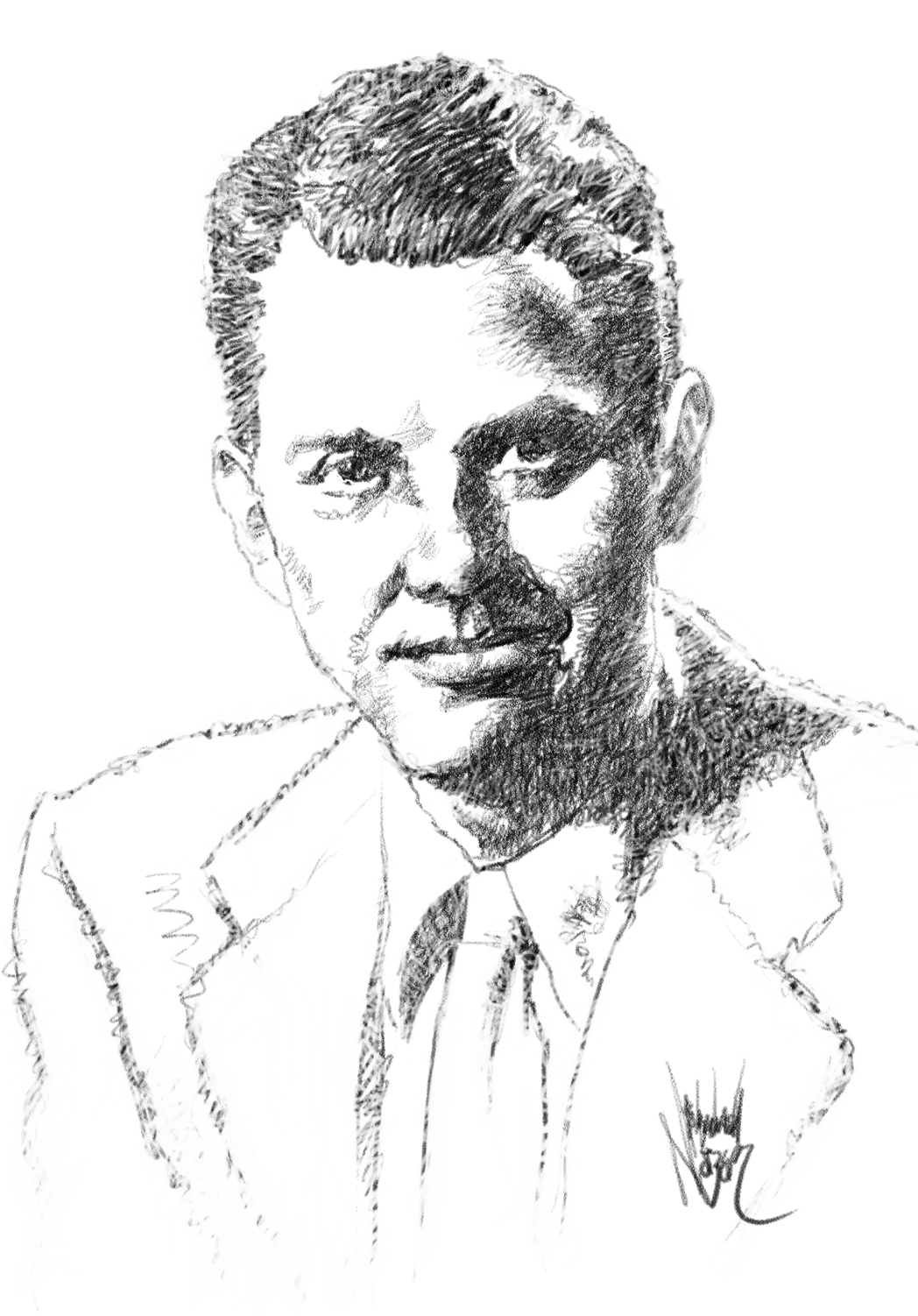
- Wayne Boring by Michael Netzer
- Born: June 5, 1905 Minnesota, U.S.
- Died: February 20, 1987 (aged 81) Pompano Beach, Florida, U.S.
- Areas: Penciller, Inker
- Pseudonym: Jack Harmon
- Notable works: Action Comics; Superman
- Awards: Will Eisner Hall of Fame, 2007

Wayne Boring (June 5, 1905 – February 20, 1987) was an American comic book artist best known for his work on Superman from the late 1940s to the 1950s. He occasionally used the pseudonym Jack Harmon.

== Biography ==
=== Early life and career ===
Boring attended the Minnesota School of Art and the Chicago Art Institute. In 1937, he began "ghosting" (drawing for hire without credit) on such comic book features as Slam Bradley and Doctor Occult for the Jerry Siegel-Joe Shuster studio. In 1938, Siegel and Shuster's character Superman was published in Action Comics #1, for the DC Comics precursor National Allied Publications, and Boring became a ghost artist on the soon spun off Superman comic strip, eventually becoming the credited artist.

=== Superman comic books ===
In 1942, the by-then-named National Comics hired Boring as a staff artist, teaming him as penciler the following year with inker Stan Kaye. The two would work together for nearly 20 years during a period fans and historians call the Golden Age of comic books. In 1948, following Siegel and Shuster's departure from the company over a Superman rights lawsuit, Mort Weisinger, the editor of the Superman line, brought in Boring as well as Al Plastino and Curt Swan. During this mid-1940s period, he often signed his work for rival Novelty Press's Blue Bolt Comics as Jack Harmon.

Superboy #1 (March–April 1949). Cover art by Boring.

Boring's "Superman Covers Atom Bomb Test!" cover for Action Comics #101 (Oct. 1946) was an early example of nuclear weapons in popular culture. A more detailed origin story for Superman by Boring and writer Bill Finger was presented in Superman #53 (July 1948) to mark the character's tenth anniversary. Boring co-created the Fortress of Solitude in Action Comics #241 (June 1958) with writer Jerry Coleman and Bizarro World in Action Comics #263 (April 1960) with Otto Binder.

Boring was the primary Superman comic book penciller through the 1950s. Swan succeeded him the following decade, though Boring returned for sporadic guest appearances in the early 1960s and then again in late 1966 and early 1967. One critic wrote of Boring's 1950s Superman art, "Comics legend Wayne Boring played a major role in visually defining the most well known super-hero in the world during the peak of Superman's popularity." Another writer echoed, "Boring's bravura brushwork defined many of its key elements and made Superman look more powerful and imposing, now standing a heroic nine heads tall, and brought a fresh realism, a sleek sci-fi vision and a greater seriousness of tone."

Boring was let go from DC in 1967 along with many other prominent writers and artists who had made demands for health and retirement benefits. From 1968 to 1972, Boring ghosted backgrounds for Hal Foster's Prince Valiant Sunday comic strip and took over the art on writer Sam Leff's 1961–71 United Feature Syndicate strip Davy Jones. Afterward, Boring drew three issues of Marvel Comics' Captain Marvel, then left the field to semi-retire as a bank security guard, though he would continue to draw commissioned work. He briefly returned to DC to pencil some stories in All-Star Squadron Annual #3 (1984), Superman #402 (Dec. 1984), and Action Comics #561 and 572 (Nov. 1984 and Oct. 1985).

Boring died of a heart attack, following a brief comeback announced in one of his last published works, penciling a Golden Age Superman story written by Roy Thomas and inked by Jerry Ordway in Secret Origins vol. 2 #1 (April 1986). His final work was All-Star Squadron #64 (Dec. 1986) a recreation of Superman #19 (Nov.-Dec. 1942).

== Awards ==
In 1985, DC Comics named Boring as one of the honorees in the company's 50th anniversary publication Fifty Who Made DC Great.

He was posthumously inducted into the Will Eisner Hall of Fame in 2007.

== Bibliography ==
Comics work (interior pencil art) includes:

=== DC Comics ===
- Action Comics #35–36, 121, 132, 134, 137–138, 141–142, 144, 146–147, 150–152, 158–168, 171, 173–175, 178–182, 184, 186–188, 190–192, 194–196, 198–200, 202–204, 206–207, 209–211, 215–216, 218–219, 221, 223–227, 229–241, 243, 245–246, 248, 250, 257–258, 261–264, 266–268, 275–276, 342–344, 346, 348–353, 355–357, 561, 572 (1941–1967, 1984–1985)
- Adventure Comics #42–43, 285 (1939, 1961)
- All-Star Squadron #64, Annual #3 (1984–1986)
- Secret Origins vol. 2 #1 (Superman) (1986)
- Showcase #10 (Lois Lane) (1957)
- Silver Age 80-Page Giant #1 (2000)
- Superboy #7 (1950)
- Superman #5, 7–8, 10, 53–110, 112–115, 117, 119–122, 124–130, 132–136, 138–143, 150, 155, 189–190, 200, 229, 402 (1940–1970, 1984)
- Superman's Girl Friend, Lois Lane #2, 4, 6–8, 10, 13 (1958–1959)
- Superman's Pal Jimmy Olsen #43 (1960)
- Who's Who: The Definitive Directory of the DC Universe #12, 14, 18–19, 22 (1986)
- World's Finest Comics #14, 35–38, 44–46, 48, 50, 52–53, 59, 62–63, 65, 68–69, 181 (1944–1968)

=== Marvel Comics ===
- Astonishing #4 (1951)
- Captain Marvel #22–24 (1972–1973)
- Creatures on the Loose #19 (Gullivar Jones, Warrior of Mars) (with Gil Kane) (1972)
- Official Handbook of the Marvel Universe Deluxe Edition #16, 19 (1987)
- Thor #280 (1979)

Preceded by Win Mortimer	Superman penciller 1948–1967	Succeeded by Curt Swan
Preceded by Al Plastino	Action Comics penciller 1949–1961	Succeeded by Curt Swan
Preceded by Al Plastino	Action Comics penciller 1966–1967	Succeeded by Curt Swan
