= Cliff Sterrett =

American cartoonist (1883–1964)

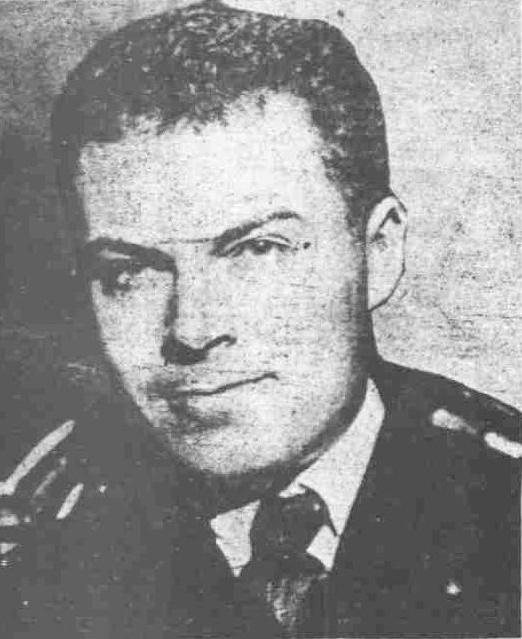
- Sterrett in 1918
- Born: December 12, 1883 Fergus Falls, Minnesota
- Died: December 28, 1964 (aged 81) Bronxville, New York
- Area: Cartoonist
- Notable works: Polly and Her Pals

Clifford Sterrett (/ˈstɛrɪt/; December 12, 1883 – December 28, 1964) was an American cartoonist best known as the creator of the comic strip Polly and Her Pals.

== Biography ==
Born in Fergus Falls, Minnesota, where his father was a druggist, Cliff Sterrett was of Scandinavian ancestry. His mother died when he was two; Cliff and his younger brother Paul were then raised by a maiden aunt, Sallie Johnson, in Alexandria, Minnesota after their father moved to Seattle.

With a letter of introduction from a local Episcopal clergyman, the 18-year-old Sterrett moved to New York, where he enrolled in the Chase Art School for two years of study. He signed on at the New York Herald in 1904 as a staff art assistant and submitted cartoons to the New York Telegram, embarking on his first comic strips: Ventriloquial Vag, Merry Ha-Ha, When a Man's Married, Before and After and For This We Have Daughters. Leaving the Telegram, he drew illustrations for The New York Times.

== Polly and Her Pals ==
At the New York Evening Journal he launched Polly and Her Pals (originally called Positive Polly) in 1912. By the mid-1920s, Sterrett had turned the daily strip over to others (notably Paul Fung and Vernon Greene) in order to concentrate on the Sunday strip. Sterrett also created the Sunday topper strips Dot and Dash and Belles and Wedding Belles.

As the 1920s continued, Sterrett's work was increasingly influenced by the abstract art of that decade, incorporating "striking patterns of abstraction much in the style of cubism and surrealism". Coulton Waugh regarded this as an innovative step forward, noting that Sterrett's style "appeared in Polly long before modern art was accepted by American art critics."

Now, Sterrett—that's the guy who was the greatest. To think that a whole generation has grown up worshipping Picasso when the guy who did it far better was Sterrett! Far better than Picasso—and Herriman. I love Herriman—he has his own special place. But I love Sterrett—he belongs someplace else...

— Al Capp, Cartoonist PROfiles #37 (March 1978)

== Girl strips ==
Polly is regarded as the first of numerous comic strips about flirting pretty girls, including Edgar Martin's Boots and Her Buddies, Chic Young's Blondie and Larry Whittington's Fritzi Ritz (which later spawned Nancy). Although Polly and Her Pals was highly influential, it was never wildly popular and lacked the merchandising and spin-off books associated with other strips.

The comic was recognised for its creation of a new subgenre and prototype, but also for its cubism-inspired graphics. It is now regarded as one of the masterpieces of American comic strips for its graphic design, storytelling and unique humor, while Sterrett is lauded as a leading graphic stylist and innovator.

When Polly and Her Pals was included in the Library of Congress exhibition Cartoon America, it was praised for its unique graphic style and ranked alongside Krazy Kat as the epitome of the Art Deco style in comics. Sterrett had considerable influence on later cartoonists, including Jules Feiffer.
