= Make Me an Offer =

1954 British film by Cyril Frankel

- Directed by: Cyril Frankel
- Written by: W. P. Lipscomb; Wolf Mankowitz
- Based on: Make Me an Offer by Wolf Mankowitz
- Produced by: W. P. Lipscomb
- Starring: Peter Finch; Adrienne Corri; Finlay Currie
- Cinematography: Denny Densham
- Edited by: Bernard Gribble
- Music by: John Addison
- Production company: Group Three Films
- Distributed by: British Lion Films
- Release dates: December 1954 (premiere); 8 May 1955 (general release)
- Running time: 88 minutes
- Country: United Kingdom
- Language: English

Make Me an Offer (also known as Make Me an Offer!) is a 1954 Eastmancolor British comedy film directed by Cyril Frankel and starring Peter Finch, Adrienne Corri, Rosalie Crutchley and Finlay Currie. It is based on the 1952 novel of the same title by Wolf Mankowitz. It was distributed by British Lion Films.

== Plot ==
On a childhood trip to the British Museum, young Charlie falls instantly in love with the Portland Vase, and his passion for it leads to him eventually becoming a dealer in English pottery. Whilst still a boy he sees a newspaper cutting that describes the theft, 50 years before in 1886, of art treasures, including a perfect green Portland Vase created by Josiah Wedgwood in 1783. Years later and struggling in his profession, Charlie learns of a room full of Wedgwood in a country mansion up for demolition. Lacking funds, he turns to Abe Sparta, a successful businessman and the owner of the house in which Charlie, his wife Bella and their two children live. He takes the train to view the contents before the auction of the mansion's contents. To his great disgust, Charlie finds only French fakes.

When Nicky, a pretty (if absentminded and clumsy) redhead, walks to the neighbouring cottage, Charlie follows. He purchases a worthless porcelain piece from her, just because she needs two pounds. She invites him to look around to see if he might find something of value. Nicky is looking after Sir John, an aged relation with a wicked reputation. Charlie conceals his astonishment upon spotting two of the art objects stolen along with the vase. Then he finds the Portland Wedgwood vase, forgotten and gathering dust in the attic. Charlie offers Nicky £10 for it, but she wants £100 for a fur coat. He reluctantly agrees, but she refuses to accept a cheque.

Charlie arranges for other bidders to come to the auction, including Wendl (a long-time bitter rival of Sparta's) and Armstrong and Armstrong's American clients, Mindel and Sweeting. At the auction, Charlie starts playing off the three competing bidders against each other, to his own profit, obtaining enough in this way to pay Nicky. When she demands £150, however, Charlie goes to Sir John revealing he knows the history of the vase and persuades him to perform the first good deed of his life and give him the vase for nothing (the rightful owner having died and left no heir). Charlie does give a delighted Nicky the promised £100 anyway. With the remainder of the day's profit, Charlie buys his wife a long-promised fur coat.

== Cast ==
- Peter Finch as Charlie
- Adrienne Corri as Nicky
- Rosalie Crutchley as Bella
- Finlay Currie as Abe Sparta
- Meier Tzelniker as Wendl
- Ernest Thesiger as Sir John
- Wilfrid Lawson as Charlie's father
- Anthony Nicholls as auctioneer
- Alfie Bass as Fred Frames
- Guy Middleton as Armstrong
- Jane Wenham as Dobbie
- Richard O'Sullivan as Charlie as a boy
- Cyril Smith as auctioneer
- Eric Francis as auctioneer's assistant
- Roger Maxwell as man bidding at auction
- Helena Pickard as lady on train
- John Le Mesurier as Mr Toshack (uncredited)
- Leonard Williams as Edward H Whybrow (uncredited)

== Production ==
Make Me an Offer was Wolf Mankowitz's first novel and was autobiographical – he had been an antique dealer since 1947. The book became a best seller.

It was Peter Finch's first starring role in a British film. In April 1954 Diane Cilento was announced as his co-star but she does not appear in the final film, being replaced by Rosalind Crutchley.

Filming started 22 April 1954 at Beaconsfield Studios. The film's sets were designed by the art director Denis Wreford. They had the film finished by August 1954 when Finch called it:

Without a doubt the best film I've ever acted in. It is adult. One might say, if one weren't a little frightened of using words, truly artistic. It is the longest part I've ever had, since I'm in every scene but one. So if anyone takes a dislike to me in the first five minutes, he is in for a bad evening. Director Cyril Frankel is. I think, one of the most able and most stimulating directors I've ever worked for. In fact, the whole of 'Group Three' Studios, where we made the film, is exciting and alive with rising talent and new ideas. It is fun because they all know they're going somewhere. Rosalie Crutchley, who plays my wife in 'Make Me An Offer,' is a splendid actress.

== Critical reception ==
The film was screened for London critics in December 1954.

The Monthly Film Bulletin wrote: "This new Group 3 production starts with the advantage of a fresh background – the antique business, which the author of the original novel, Wolf Mankowitz, knows well – and some ingeniously contrived situations. But it does not make very much of them. Both script and direction are somewhat laborious; the latter has a strenuous brightness, particularly in the scenes between Charlie and his wife, done with an ostentatious naturalistic and "intimate " technique which appears very false. Most of the dialogue is written for Jewish characters, which is why Meier Tzelniker, as a cunning old dealer, comes off much the best. Peter Finch does not seem altogether at ease as Charlie; Adrienne Corri and Rosalie Crutchley flounder as Nicky and Bella; and Ernest Thesiger, as the somnolent but wicked Sir John, contributes an authentically bizarre and entertaining character sketch."

British film critic Leslie Halliwell said: "Mildly pleasant Jewish comedy with interesting sidelights on the antique business."

In British Sound Films: The Studio Years 1928–1959 David Quinlan rated the film as "average", writing: "Strenuous comedy has some ripe character cameos, but a slow pace."

Sky Movies called it an "Engaging comedy", with an "amusing script", concluding, "Far from least, there's that splendid veteran Ernest Thesiger, here as a great-great-grandfather whose past life has not been exactly without reproach...".

The New York Times critic Bosley Crowther described it and another film on a double bill as "unpretentious British comedies."

== Musical ==
The novel was adapted into a musical with book by Mankowitz and music and lyrics by Monty Norman and David Heneker. Originally performed at Joan Littlewood's Theatre Royal Stratford East in October 1959, it transferred to the West End's New Theatre in December 1959. The original London cast featured Daniel Massey, Dilys Laye and Martin Miller. The musical was successful and there was talk it would be adapted into a film. It received the Evening Standard Award for Best Musical of 1959.

== TV Adaptation ==
In 1966 the novel was adapted for the BBC as a play in two parts.
