= A Kid for Two Farthings =

A Kid for Two Farthings may refer to:

- A Kid for Two Farthings (novel)
- A Kid for Two Farthings (film)
