= Dilys Laye =

English actress and singer (1934–2009)

- Laye in Carry On Camping (1969)
- Born: Dilys Lay; 11 March 1934; Muswell Hill, Middlesex, England
- Died: 13 February 2009 (aged 74); London, England
- Years active: 1949-2008
- Spouse(s): Frank Maher (m. 1957, divorced) Garfield Morgan (m. 1963, divorced) Alan Downer (m. 1972; died 1995)
- Children: 1, with Downer

Dilys Laye (born Dilys Lay; 11 March 1934 – 13 February 2009) was an English actress and singer, best known for her comedy roles, in which she was seen in the West End and on Broadway for more than fifty years, beginning in 1951. Although primarily a stage performer, she broadcast frequently on radio and television, and appeared in films.

Laye's teenage work included drama, pantomime, revue and early experiences in television and film. From 1954 she appeared in a long run on Broadway in the musical The Boy Friend before returning to British films and theatre, including a long West End run in The Tunnel of Love. In the 1960s she appeared in four of the Carry On film series and other films, television sitcoms and stage comedies and dramas.

From the 1970s she had a long and productive association with the playwright Peter Barnes, appearing in his original works and his radio and stage adaptations of plays by authors from Thomas Otway to Frank Wedekind and Georges Feydeau. With the Royal Shakespeare Company and other troupes, in addition to modern comedy roles, Laye appeared in plays by Shakespeare, Wilde, Brecht, Beckett, Genet and Dickens adaptations. In her last two decades, she played in musical theatre roles ranging from Gilbert and Sullivan to Sondheim and Lloyd Webber, as well as other stage and television roles.

== Early life ==
Laye was born in London, the daughter of Edward Charles Lay and his wife Margaret, née Hewitt. (She added the fourth letter to her stage surname in the mid-1950s.) Her father left the family when she was aged eight to work as a musician in South Africa and never came back. During the Second World War she and her brother were evacuated to Devon, where they were unhappy and endured physical abuse.

Laye returned home to a new stepfather and a mother who was keen to transfer her frustrated theatrical ambitions to her daughter. Laye was educated at St Dominic's Sixth Form College, Harrow and trained for the stage at the Aida Foster School.

== Career ==
=== 1948–1959 ===
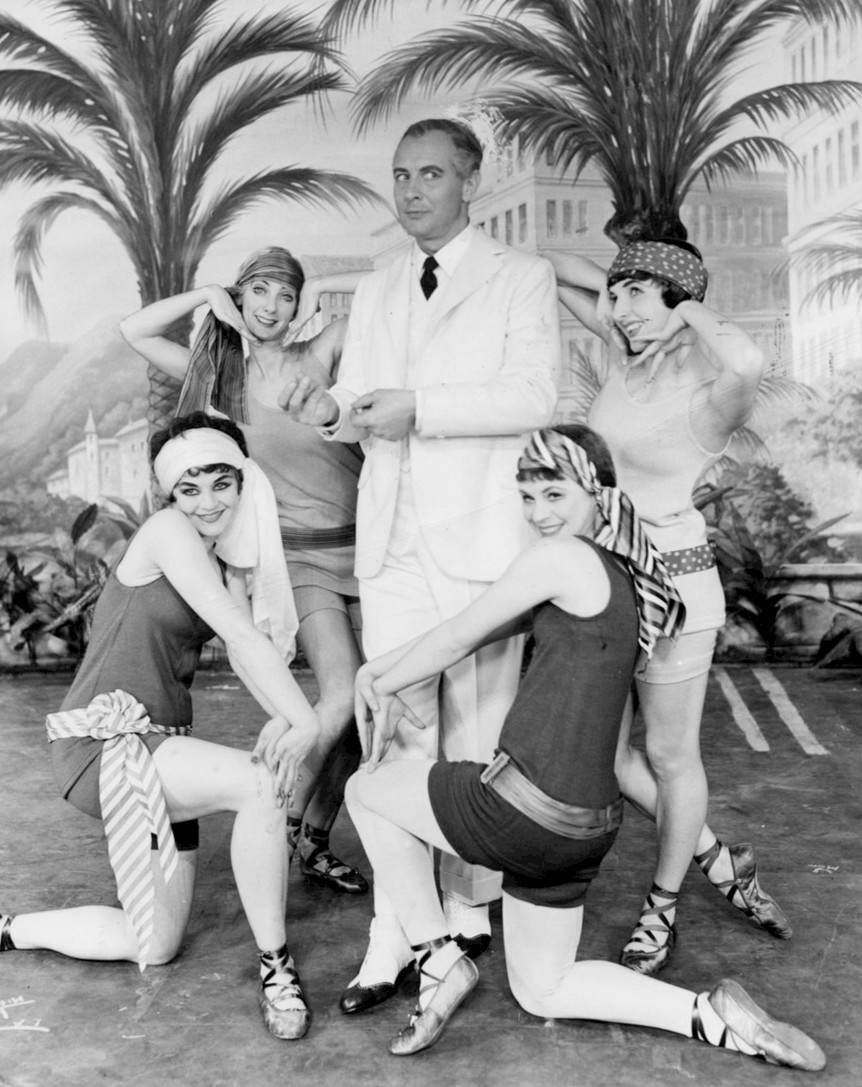
From the original Broadway production of The Boy Friend; clockwise from left: Stella Claire, Lyn Connorty, Eric Berry, Laye, Millicent Martin (1955)

Laye made her stage début at the New Lindsey Theatre Club, Notting Hill in April 1948, playing a boy, Moritz Scharf, in The Burning Bush, Noel Langley's drama about state persecution of Jews. In the 1948–49 Christmas season she played Bobby, the nephew of the wicked Baron de Rostonveg ("Monsewer" Eddie Gray) in the pantomime Babes in the Wood at the Prince's Theatre, London. She had her first film role in 1949 in Trottie True playing Trottie (Jean Kent) as a child, and made her first television appearance the following year in a revue, Flotsam's Follies.

Laye first appeared on the West End stage in October 1951 at the New Theatre in the musical And So to Bed by J. B. Fagan, playing Lettice, maid to Samuel Pepys's wife. In January 1953 she returned to the New Lindsey for the revue Intimacy at Eight, which was seen there and elsewhere in various revised versions intermittently over the next two years.

At the Hippodrome in May 1953 Laye appeared in the revue High Spirits, starring Cyril Ritchard and Diana Churchill, in a supporting cast including Ian Carmichael, Joan Sims and Patrick Cargill. In April 1954 she was in another revised version of the New Lindsey revue, presented at the Criterion Theatre as Intimacy at 8.30, alongside Sims, Joan Heal, Ron Moody and Ronnie Stevens.

Laye made her Broadway début in September 1954, playing Dulcie in the musical The Boy Friend opposite Julie Andrews (as Polly), with whom she shared a flat for much of the 485-performance run. Andrews wrote of her friend's performance:

Dilys Laye immediately found a wonderful character reading for her role as Dulcie. She knew just how to raise a shoulder, assume a stance, or bat her eyes. She had a husky voice, which she used to marvellous effect.

During this period, The Stage recorded, Laye "was dated by a handsome young actor called James Baumgarner, whose career took off when he changed his surname to Garner". Laye recalled in 2005:

There were so many parties I don't think I ever went to sleep. People like Cary Grant and Danny Kaye would suddenly appear at the dressing room door, come to pay their respects. It was all rather unreal.

The Broadway run was the last time she performed as Dilys Lay: on her return to Britain she added an e to her stage surname, and was billed as Dilys Laye for the rest of her career.

Although the stage remained her first love, Laye made several films in the 1950s. In 1954 and 1957 she played a sixth-former in The Belles of St Trinian's and Blue Murder at St Trinian's and Jasmine Hatchet in Doctor at Large in 1957.

One of the few failures of Laye's stage career came in 1957 with The Crystal Heart at the Saville Theatre, London. Ned Sherrin described the piece as "a disastrous camp American musical". At the first night Laye's line "What a lovely afternoon" was greeted by a voice from the gallery, "Not a very lovely evening". The production closed after five performances. At Her Majesty's Theatre in December 1957 Laye played Estell Novick in a non-musical comedy, The Tunnel of Love. Despite mixed notices for the play, Laye and her co-star Carmichael were praised, and the piece ran for more than a year. Laye then joined Joan Littlewood's Theatre Workshop company to play Redhead in a musical adaptation of Wolf Mankowitz's novel Make Me an Offer, seen first at the Theatre Royal, Stratford East in October 1959 and then at the New from December. Laye's notices were excellent, but she later commented that she did not work with Littlewood again, "and you can draw your own conclusions from that".

=== 1960–1980 ===
In 1962 Laye made her first of four appearances in the Carry On films, replacing an unwell Joan Sims as Flo Castle in Carry On Cruising at three days' notice. She returned as Lila in Carry On Spying (1964), Mavis Winkle in Carry On Doctor (1967) and Anthea Meeks in Carry On Camping (1969). On television she appeared in an episode of the BBC television sitcom The Rag Trade in 1962 and in 1965 she co-starred with her friend Sheila Hancock in six episodes of the sitcom The Bed-Sit Girl. After that she appeared in the West End comedy Say Who You Are with Carmichael, Cargill and Jan Holden. In 1967 she had a cameo role in Charlie Chaplin's romantic film comedy A Countess from Hong Kong, playing a scene opposite Marlon Brando.

In 1968 Laye moved from light comedy to play Mrs Shin in Bertold Brecht's The Good Woman of Setzuan at the Oxford Playhouse, with Hancock in the title role. At the Mermaid Theatre in London in 1969 she played Polly Butler in Children's Day, a comedy by Keith Waterhouse and Willis Hall, co-starring with Prunella Scales, Edward de Souza and Gerald Flood. The following year she toured as Miriam in Gwyn Thomas's comedy, The Keep.

In 1973 Laye began an enduring professional association with the playwright Peter Barnes, playing Gertrude in his adaptation of the early 17th-century comedy Eastward Ho! on BBC radio. The following year she made her first appearance with the Royal Shakespeare Company (RSC), playing Theresa Diego in Barnes's historical drama The Bewitched. She continued in the role in May 1974 when the production transferred to the Aldwych Theatre, London. Two years later, at the Old Vic, Barnes directed The Frontiers of Farce, a double bill of his adaptations of one-act plays by Frank Wedekind and Georges Feydeau, in which Laye starred with Leonard Rossiter, John Stride and John Phillips. Actress and playwright worked together on three more radio presentations in the 1970s: his adaptations of Wedekind's Lulu, in which she played Countess Geschwitz (1978) and of Thomas Middleton's A Chaste Maid in Cheapside, described in the Radio Times as "a bawdy Jacobean black comedy", and between these two adaptations Laye appeared with Barnes in The Two Hangmen, a radio cabaret of songs, poems and sketches by Wedekind and Bertolt Brecht. Her main television work in 1975 was co-starring with Reg Varney in an ITV sitcom called Down the 'Gate.

=== 1980–2009 ===
In 1981 Laye appeared in, and co-wrote, the ITV comedy series Chintz. She continued her association with Barnes, playing Lady Dunce, described as "a married 'widow'" in his radio adaptation of Thomas Otway's comedy The Soldier's Fortune (1981), and in the same year performed The Theory and Practice of Belly-Dancing, one of Barnes's monologues for radio written for specific performers including John Gielgud and Laurence Olivier. In the theatre Laye appeared in two more productions by Barnes: another Wedekind adaptation and a new revue (The Devil Himself, 1980, and Somersaults, 1981). She had leading roles in two further Barnes adaptations for the BBC: Helen in Wedekind's The Singer and Catherine in Feydeau's Le Bourgeon, given as The Primrose Path (1984).

In the second half of the 1980s Laye appeared in several RSC productions, playing First Witch in Macbeth (1986); Mrs Needham in The Art of Success (1986 and 1987); Nurse in Romeo and Juliet (1986 and 1987); Aunt Em and Glinda in their version of The Wizard of Oz (1987); Irma in The Balcony (1987); and Parthy Ann in the RSC's co-production with Opera North of Show Boat (1989). In between these she played Oscar Wilde's Lady Bracknell in The Importance of Being Earnest in the inaugural production of the Wilde Theatre, Bracknell in 1984, and Ruth in a version of The Pirates of Penzance at the Manchester Opera House with Michael Ball as Frederic and Paul Nicholas as the Pirate King in 1985. Laye's later RSC appearances were as Maria in Twelfth Night (1996) and Mrs Medlock in the musical The Secret Garden (2000 and 2001).

In the 1990s she toured in The Phantom of the Opera, Sweeney Todd, Fiddler on the Roof and 42nd Street. In 1992 she played Winnie, the central role in Samuel Beckett's Happy Days, at Salisbury Playhouse. Her later West End credits included the musicals Nine in 1997 and Into the Woods in 1998, both at the Donmar Warehouse, a Mother Courage figure in Barnes's mediaeval play Dreaming at the Queen's (1999), Elizabeth II in Single Spies in 2000, and Mrs Pearce in Trevor Nunn's revival of My Fair Lady at the Theatre Royal, Drury Lane in 2002.

Laye featured as Madame de Rosemond in a revival of Christopher Hampton's Les Liaisons Dangereuses at the Playhouse Theatre in 2004, receiving the Clarence Derwent Award for best supporting actress. In 2005, she toured Britain as the Grandmother in Roald Dahl's The Witches. Her later television work included Mrs Sparsit in Barnes's adaptation of Hard Times, and character roles in EastEnders, Coronation Street, Holby City, Midsomer Murders, Doctors, The Amazing Mrs Pritchard, and The Commander. Her final stage work came in 2006 in the three roles of Miss La Creevy, Mrs Gudden, and Peg Sliderskew in the Chichester Festival Theatre's revival of the RSC's epic Nicholas Nickleby. During rehearsals, she was diagnosed with lung cancer. She kept her illness secret from the rest of the cast, but was too ill to transfer with the production to London.

== Personal life and death ==
Laye married three times: first to Frank Maher, a stuntman, and then in 1963 to the actor Garfield Morgan; they subsequently divorced. In 1972 she married her third husband, Alan Downer, who wrote scripts for Coronation Street and Emmerdale Farm on television and Waggoners' Walk on radio. He died in 1995 after years of ill health following a stroke. They had a son, Andrew, who was an agent for film crews.

Laye died of lung cancer aged 74. She outlived her doctors' predictions by six months, and lived to see her son's marriage.

== Filmography ==
- Trottie True (1949) – Trottie as a young girl
- Torment (1950) – Violet Crier
- The Belles of St Trinian's (1954) – Sixth Former
- Doctor at Large (1957) – Mrs Jasmine Hatchet
- Blue Murder at St Trinian's (1957) – Bridget Strong
- Idol on Parade (1959) – Renee
- The Bridal Path (1959) – Isobel
- Upstairs and Downstairs (1959) – Agency girl
- Follow a Star (1959) – Lady with dog called Poochie-Pie
- Please Turn Over (1959) – Millicent Jones
- Petticoat Pirates (1961) – Sue
- Carry On Cruising (1962) – Flo Castle
- On the Beat (1962) – American girl
- Carry On Spying (1964) – Lila
- A Countess from Hong Kong (1967) – Saleswoman
- Carry On Doctor (1967) – Mavis Winkle
- Carry On Camping (1969) – Anthea Meeks
- EastEnders (Television) Recurring role 1994–95, Maxine Palmer
- Alice in Wonderland (1999) – The Governess
- Coronation Street (2000–2001) – Isabel Stephens
- Dog Eat Dog (2001) – Edith Scarman
- Frankie Howerd: Rather You Than Me (2008) – Edith Howerd

== Sources ==
- Andrews, Julie (2009). Home: A Memoir of my Early Years. London: Phoenix. ISBN 978-0-75-382568-6.
- Barnes, Peter (1974). The Bewitched: a Play. London: Heinemann. ISBN 978-0-435-23061-6.
- Brandreth, Gyles (1982). Great Theatrical Disasters. London: Granada. ISBN 978-0-24-611770-0.
- Fairclough, Robert (2011). This Charming Man: The Life of Ian Carmichael. London: Arum Press. ISBN 978-1-8451-3664-2.
- Herbert, Ian, ed. (1972). Who's Who in the Theatre (fifteenth ed.). London: Sir Isaac Pitman and Sons. ISBN 978-0-273-31528-5.
- Hibbin, Sally; Nina Hibbin (1988). What a Carry On: The Official Story of the Carry On Film Series. London: Hamlyn. ISBN 978-0-60-055819-4.
- Sherrin, Ned (1991). Ned Sherrin's Theatrical Anecdotes. London: Virgin. ISBN 978-0-86-369606-0.
- Ross, Andrew (2015). Carry On Actors: the Complete Who's Who of the Carry On Film Series. Coventry: Fantom Publishing. ISBN 978-1-7819-6150-6.
