= Dick Rockwell =

American comics artist and illustrator

- Born: Richard Waring Rockwell; December 11, 1920
- Died: April 18, 2006 (aged 85)
- Areas: Penciller; Inker
- Awards: Inkpot Award (1981)

Richard Waring Rockwell (December 11, 1920 – April 18, 2006) was an American comic strip and comic book artist best known as Milt Caniff's uncredited art assistant for 35 years on the adventure strip Steve Canyon. Rockwell was a nephew of the famed painter and illustrator Norman Rockwell.

== Biography ==
Action Comics Weekly #629 (Dec. 6, 1988), featuring the Secret Six; cover art by Rockwell.

=== Early life and career ===
Raised in Kane, Pennsylvania, Dick Rockwell was the son of Jerry Rockwell — brother of painter and illustrator Norman Rockwell — and Carol Rockwell. He had a brother, John. Rockwell began his career after World War II, during which he'd served as a U.S. Army Air Corps pilot who flew Allied troops to France on D-Day and to the Ardennes Forest for the Battle of the Bulge. His first known comic-book credit is penciling and inking the one-page "Little Know [sic.] Facts About Well-Known Animals" in publisher Fiction House's Jungle Comics #113 (May 1949), and his first known story art is the seven-page "The Masquerading Bandits" in the Prize Comics crime series Headline Comics #36 (Aug. 1949).

He went on to draw for Lev Gleason Publications' Crime Does Not Pay and Black Diamond Western. As Rockwell told the story, samples of this work, which he supplied with his membership application to the National Cartoonists Society in 1952, caught the attention of Milt Caniff, the organization's president at the time. Soon afterward, Caniff hired Rockwell to assist on Caniff's classic syndicated newspaper strip Steve Canyon, penciling and inking secondary characters and backgrounds; Caniff wrote, drew the main characters, and did finishing touches. He served as the uncredited art assistant on Steve Canyon for 35 years, continuing for a brief time after Caniff's death in 1988.

Rockwell's other comic-book work includes at least one story each in 1951 for Man Comics, Girl Comics, Crime Exposed and Susepense, from Atlas Comics, the 1950s precursor of Marvel Comics; and, in 1983 and 1988, a smattering of work for DC Comics, including on the military adventure title Blackhawk. His final comic-book work was penciling and inking a six-page story and a two-page character profile, both featuring the "Blackhawk Express", in Blackhawk Annual #1 (1989).

=== Courtroom artist and other work ===
Rockwell additionally worked as a courtroom artist doing trial sketches, starting with the 1957 U.S. Supreme Court case involving school desegregation in Little Rock, Arkansas. His courtroom work remained a minor sideline until 1983. Rockwell covered the robbery and murder trial of members of the Weather Underground and the Black Liberation Army who had robbed a Brinks armored truck in Nyack, New York.

Like his famous uncle, Rockwell also did magazine illustrations. As well, he drew editorial cartoons and he taught at New York University, the Parsons School of Design, and the Fashion Institute of Technology, all in Manhattan, New York City.
