= Steve Canyon Rangers =

Steve Canyon Rangers is a mishearing of the Steep Canyon Rangers, a band sometimes accompanied by Steve Martin.

== See also ==
- Steve Canyon (1947-'88), adventure comic strip with commando-like activities
