= Philip Cochran =

American aerial military officer

Philip Gerald Cochran
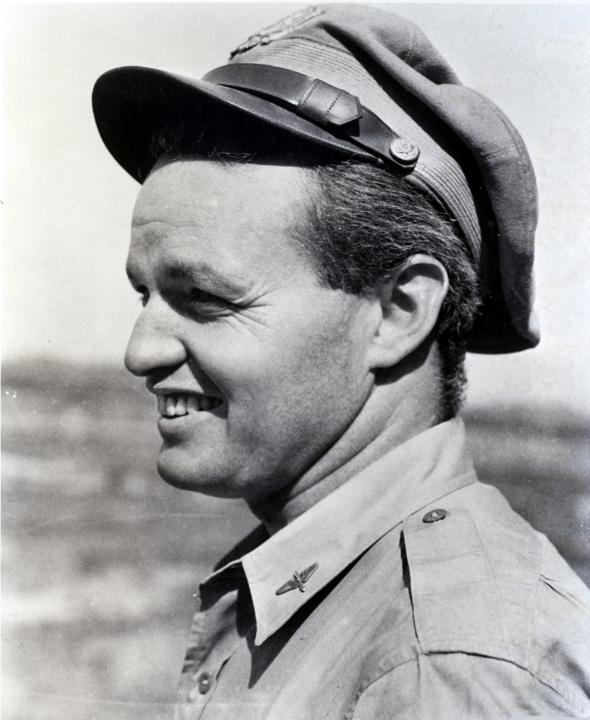
- Colonel Philip Cochran, USAAF, in 1944.
- Born: January 29, 1910; Erie, Pennsylvania
- Died: August 26, 1979 (aged 69); Geneseo, New York
- Military career
- Allegiance: United States
- Branch: U.S. Army Air Corps (1935–1941); U.S. Army Air Forces (1941–1945)
- Service years: 1935–1945
- Rank: Colonel
- Commands: 1st Air Commando Group
- Conflicts: World War II: North African Campaign; Burma Campaign
- Awards: Distinguished Service Medal; Distinguished Service Order (UK) Distinguished Flying Cross; Croix de Guerre (France)

Philip Gerald Cochran (born in Erie, Pennsylvania; January 29, 1910 - August 26, 1979) was an officer in the United States Army Air Corps and the United States Army Air Forces. Cochran developed many tactical air combat, air transport, and air assault techniques during the war, particularly in Burma during operations as co-commander (with Col John R. Alison) of the 1st Air Commando Group. Cochran was the inspiration behind characters in the Terry and the Pirates and Steve Canyon comic strips by Milton Caniff.

== Early life ==
After earning a business degree from Ohio State University in 1935, Cochran enlisted as a pilot in the Army Air Corps because "it looked like a good way to make an easy living."

Cochran knew Milton Caniff at Ohio State, so he approached him in 1941 to design an insignia for his 65th Fighter Squadron (predecessor of the modern 65th Aggressor Squadron.) After watching Cochran's squadron, Caniff thought Cochran and his squadron had potential as characters for comics. Cochran became famous during the war as the model for the character Flip Corkin, a character in the comic strip Terry and the Pirates. Later, Cochran became the model for another character in the Caniff comic strip Steve Canyon. Cochran's character was named General Philerie; a combination of his first name, Phil, and his hometown, Erie.

== World War II ==
=== North Africa ===
Major Cochran led the 33rd Fighter Group's "advanced attrition" fighter planes and replacement pilots to the North African campaign. His men called themselves the "Joker Squadron" because the squadron had been designated as "J Squadron" in the plan for the landings in North Africa. In December, 1942 he took the 58th Fighter Squadron into the captured advanced airfield at Thelepte, an airfield in western Tunisia. His Deputy Commander called him "a colorful individual, a natural leader. He was aggressive, but not ambitiously so". Cochran was soon mentioned in press reports. While flying from Thelepte, Cochran dropped a 500-pound bomb; it skipped directly into the German headquarters at the Hotel Splendida, Kairouan, Tunisia. He destroyed telegraph wires by flying over them with a lead weight on the end of a wire attached to the wing of his pursuit plane, a tactic he employed later in Burma. By the end of hostilities in the theater, he had shot down two German fighter planes.

Although a fighter pilot, Cochran flew the lead C-47 on Christmas Eve 1942, airdropping paratroopers of the 509th Infantry Regiment to destroy the El Djem Bridge in Tunisia. He and his squadron unsuccessfully attempted to destroy the bridge by dive-bombing. He got lost during the night operation, and dropped the paratroopers in the wrong direction from the bridge; most of them were killed or captured. Prior to his return to the US, he was assigned to XII Training Command; he trained new fighter squadrons, including the 99th Fighter Squadron, just come over after completing their training at Tuskegee, Alabama.

Cochran developed a reputation for 'getting the job done', and had little respect for those he believed were obstructing him, regardless of rank. On one occasion, Cochran clashed with General Henri Giraud, commander of French forces in North Africa. French ground forces, for whom Phil's squadron was flying air support, were mauled by army units under the command of General Erwin Rommel. In a meeting between Cochran and Giraud after the battle, Giraud shouted at Cochran, "There should be more planes, hundreds more!" Cochran retorted, "You got to fight on the ground! You can't hide behind a rock and have planes do the whole job." A few days later, Cochran received a letter from General Giraud, conceding the former was correct. Not long after, Col. Cochran was awarded the Croix de Guerre medal by the French government.

=== Burma ===
Cochran, by now a lieutenant colonel, and John R. Alison (former deputy commander of the 75th Fighter Squadron) were picked by General Hap Arnold as co-commanders of the 1st USAAF Air Commando Group. (While an informal agreement existed between Cochran and Alison over who was effectively Commander [Cochran] and Deputy Commander [Alison], this arrangement was unofficial. To this day, USAF records indicate Col Cochran and Col Alison as 'co-commanders'.) The 1st Air Commando, among other missions, was assigned the task of supporting Allied Long Range Penetration Groups, of the British Army's Chindits, invading Japanese-held Burma. Some of these forces were designated to fly in by towed gliders; all required re-supply by regular airdrops during their missions, as well as air support. Under Cochran's command, the 1st Air Commando's C-47 pilots perfected the tactic of snatching loaded gliders from small areas of ground cleared of jungle vegetation into the air using stretchable nylon ropes, all while flying at 15 to 30 feet using breaks in the jungle canopy. Upon witnessing one of these demonstrations, the Allied theater commander, Admiral Lord Louis Mountbatten exclaimed, "Jesus Christ All Bloody Mighty!"

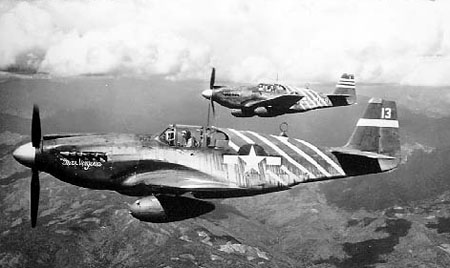
Philip Cochran in his P-51A (background) over Burma.

Col. Cochran ordered the 1st Air Commando to support ground troops without reservation: his sense of humor, aggressiveness, and willingness to risk his planes and pilots in daring support missions soon won the admiration of many officers and men of the Indian Army, who, up to that point, experienced lackluster support from hard-pressed Royal Air Force squadrons. In particular, the news Cochran would make light planes and gliders (snatched from the ground by low-flying C-47s) available to evacuate wounded men from combat greatly-increased the morale of the long-range jungle penetration forces. One Brit commander summed the change:

"The commanders' hopes and the soldiers' morale rose sky-high.  Now, if we got hit in the middle of Burma, we would not be left under a bush to die."[13]  Cochran's infectious confidence and unstinting support for Allied operations in Burma caused Admiral Mountbatten to remark to Cochran:
"My boy, you are the only ray of sunshine in this theatre this year."[8]

1st Air Commando was also called upon to perform ground support missions for the Long Range brigades, including bombing and strafing attacks. In one incident, the group's P-51 Mustangs failed to down a single telephone line on wooden poles using bombs, the P-51's used a daring tactic: "The lead plane swooped and banked...his lower wing tip ripped momentarily across an open space in the jungle, perhaps three feet above the ground...the second plane swerved...straight at us out of the land in a tight turn, wing tip brushing the ground...[We saw] telephone wire hanging around in festoons at the edge of the jungle."

== Postwar ==
Cochran was director of aerial scenes in the Howard Hughes film Jet Pilot starring John Wayne and Janet Leigh.

Col. Cochran eventually retired from the USAAF, returning home to Erie, Pennsylvania, US. There he joined his brother John's company, Lyons Transportation Lines, where he would eventually become chairman of the board.

Cochran dated actress Betty White in the early 1960s after being introduced by Jack Paar. White declined his marriage proposal; later dating Cochran and her future husband Allen Ludden simultaneously, until her romance with Ludden became serious.

Cochran also became active in charitable organizations such as the Pennsylvania Heart Association. He was a consistent supporter for Erie's Gannon University, and attended many USAAF reunions. Cochran died of a heart attack while fox hunting in Geneseo, New York, in 1979.
