= Mankowitz =

Mankowitz is a surname. Notable people with the surname include:

- Gered Mankowitz (born 1946), English photographer
- Wolf Mankowitz (1924–1998), English writer, playwright, and screenwriter
