= Make Me an Offer (novel) =

1952 novel

- First edition
- Author: Wolf Mankowitz
- Language: English
- Genre: Comedy
- Publisher: Deutsch; Dutton (US)
- Publication date: 1952
- Publication place: United Kingdom
- Media type: Print

Make Me an Offer is a 1952 comedy novel by the British writer Wolf Mankowitz. It was his debut novel and was a success. The plot revolves around an antique dealer. It was published in the United States by Dutton. He followed it up with another success A Kid for Two Farthings in 1953.

== Film adaptation ==
In 1954 it was made into the British film Make Me an Offer directed by Cyril Frankel and starring Peter Finch, Adrienne Corri and Finlay Currie.

== Bibliography ==
- Gale, Steven H. Encyclopedia of British Humorists: Geoffrey Chaucer to John Cleese, Volume 1.
- Goble, Alan. The Complete Index to Literary Sources in Film. Walter de Gruyter, 1999.
