= Down the 'Gate =

British TV sitcom (1975–1976)

- Genre: Sitcom
- Written by: Maurice Sellar; Roy Tuvey; Reg Varney
- Directed by: Alan Tarrant; William G. Stewart
- Starring: Reg Varney; Dilys Laye
- Country of origin: United Kingdom
- Original language: English
- No. of series: 2
- No. of episodes: 12

Production
- Running time: 30 minutes
- Production company: Associated Television

Original release
- Network: ITV
- Release: 23 July 1975 – 29 August 1976

Down the 'Gate is a British comedy television series that ran for two series on ITV from 1975 to 1976. It starred Reg Varney as a fish porter at London's Billingsgate Market.

== Main cast ==
- Reg Varney as Reg Furnell
- Dilys Laye as Irene Furnell
- Geoffrey Hinsliff as Landlord at 'The Lamb'
- Helen Keating as Rosie, Canteen Girl
- Peter Spraggon as Harry
- Reg Lye as Old Wol
- Percy Herbert as Reg's Boss

== Bibliography ==
- Quinlan, David. Quinlan's Illustrated Directory of Film Comedy Stars. Batsford, 1992.
