= Charles Russhon =

American photographer and US Air Force officer

Charles J. Russhon
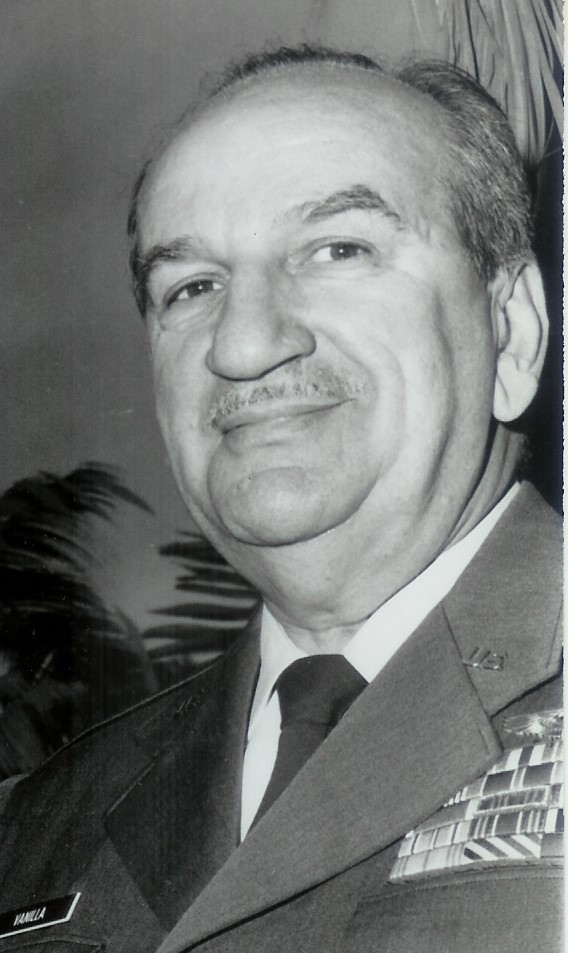
- Russhon during production of Thunderball, 1965
- Born: March 23, 1911; New York City, U.S.
- Died: June 26, 1982 (aged 71); New York City, U.S.
- Occupation: Photographer

Charles J. Russhon (March 23, 1911 - June 26, 1982) was an American photographer and Lieutenant Colonel in the United States Air Force who later became noted for his role as a technical adviser and liaison officer on the Sean Connery and Roger Moore James Bond films of the 1960s and 1970s.

== Biography ==
Prior to the attack on Pearl Harbor, Russhon worked as a sound engineer for NBC in New York City and for Hollywood-based Republic Pictures in Hollywood.

He served as a photographer in World War II and He served in the China-Burma-India Theater of World War II with the 1st Air Commando Group as the unit's photographic officer. His service alongside the Chindits led him to be awarded the British Distinguished Flying Cross.

He was the first American to photograph Hiroshima after the atomic bomb attack. He attained the rank of lieutenant colonel in the United States Army Air Forces, later transferring to the United States Air Force when it became an independent service in 1947.

After the war, Russhon was a technical adviser to several filmmakers, using his experience from the military. In 1963 he negotiated the use of land in Istanbul from the Turkish authorities during the making of From Russia with Love. In 1964 he obtained rights to use Fort Knox for Goldfinger. The producers acknowledge his help by a sign in the film at Fort Knox that reads "Welcome to Fort Knox - Gen. Russhon".

He was also an adviser on the 1965 Bond film Thunderball and was able to supply the Bell Rocket Belt, the experimental rocket fuel jetpack which is used by James bond to avoid capture in the pre credits sequence. Russhon using his position was also able to gain access to the US Navy's still experimental Skyhook rescue system which was used to lift actors Sean Connery and Claudine Auger from the water at the end of the film. Russhon appears in Air Force uniform in the film.

Russhon later worked on You Only Live Twice in 1966-67 where he was able to bring Gyrojet weapons into the U.K. and Live and Let Die in 1973 where he was able to stop traffic in New York City for a sequence in the film.

== Personal life ==
Russhon was a lifelong close friend of the renowned cartoonist Milton Caniff, and provided Caniff with the inspiration behind his ice cream-loving character Charlie Vanilla in the comic strip Steve Canyon, Caniff was well aware of Russhon's fondness for the dessert. though the ice cream cone was fashioned after Charles's addiction to chocolate ice cream, but Caniff decided that 'Vanilla,' with the dangling vowel sounded more ominous.

He died at his Manhattan home on Saturday June 26, 1982, aged 71, and was survived by his wife Claire, and a son, Christian, both of New York City.

== Filmography ==
- Thunderball (1965) - Air Force Officer (uncredited)
