= Steve Canyon =

Comic strip

- Steve Canyon (1950)
- Author: Milton Caniff
- Current status/schedule: Discontinued
- Launch date: January 13, 1947
- End date: June 4, 1988
- Syndicate(s): Field Enterprises, Sun and Times Company, Publishers Syndicate / Publishers-Hall Syndicate, Field Enterprises / News America Syndicate / North America Syndicate
- Genre: Adventure
- Preceded by: Terry and the Pirates

Steve Canyon is an American action-adventure comic strip by cartoonist Milton Caniff. Launched shortly after Caniff retired from his previous strip, Terry and the Pirates, Steve Canyon ran from January 13, 1947, until June 4, 1988. It ended shortly after Caniff's death. Caniff won the Reuben Award for the strip in 1971.

Milton Caniff's Steve Canyon (November 17, 1963)

== History ==
By 1946, Caniff had developed a worldwide reputation for his syndicated Terry and the Pirates, but the rights for the strip he had created, written, and drawn (for Chicago Tribune newspaper syndicate editor Captain Joseph Patterson) were entirely owned by the syndicate. Seeking creative control, Caniff negotiated with Field Enterprises for a new strip on which he could retain ownership. Steve Canyon was "marketed and distributed by King Features, which was subcontracted as Field's selling agent". Caniff's popularity meant that sixty clients agreed to run Steve Canyon before publication. The last Caniff episode of Terry and the Pirates appeared in December 1946, and then George Wunder took over the strip. Caniff's new strip, Steve Canyon, debuted in 168 newspapers. In the 1950s, the strip was enormously popular, and Caniff and Steve Canyon appeared on the covers of both Time (1947) and Newsweek (1950).

Many strip creators before and since have employed uncredited assistants or ghost artists, and Caniff was no exception. In 1952, he hired comic book artist Dick Rockwell (nephew of famed illustrator Norman Rockwell) as his assistant. While Caniff scripted and drew the main characters, Rockwell penciled and inked secondary characters and backgrounds. Rockwell continued on Canyon until Caniff's death on May 3, 1988. The last syndicated Steve Canyon strip was a tribute to Caniff in two panels, one drawn by cartoonist Bill Mauldin, with the other containing the signatures of 78 fellow cartoonists.

On June 23, 1997, an authorized 50th-anniversary Steve Canyon strip was published by the Air Force Times, a civilian weekly newspaper covering the United States Air Force. Steve Canyon and the U.S. Air Force having been created the same year, the shared anniversary was celebrated with Steve Canyon appearing as part of a 96-page insert, The First Fifty Years: U.S. Air Force 1947–1997. Drawn in the style of a Sunday strip, the story and art for this commemorative were provided by Air Force Master Sergeant Russ Maheras, with coloring by Carl Gafford. On Monday, September 24, 2007, Air Force Times published a 60th-anniversary Steve Canyon strip by Maheras. The color, Sunday-style strip depicts Brigadier General Steve Canyon in Afghanistan, investigating Taliban activity.

== Characters and story ==
Steve Canyon was an easygoing adventurer with a soft heart. Originally a veteran running his own air-transport business, the character returned to the U.S. Air Force during the Korean War and stayed in the military for the remainder of the strip's run. In later years, he was involved in Air Force intelligence and operations.

Initially, his buddies were fellow veterans, and romantic interest was provided by Copper Calhoon, a kind of capitalist version of the popular Dragon Lady character Caniff had created for Terry and the Pirates. Eventually, Canyon developed a sometime-sidekick in crotchety millionaire adventurer Happy Easter, along with a permanent love interest in Summer Olson, initially Calhoon's private secretary. (Canyon and Olson married in the April 24-25, 1970, daily strips.) General Philerie was based on legendary World War II hero Phil Cochran, who came from Erie, as noted in the character's name ("Phil-Erie"). Cochran had been the model for Flip Corkin from Terry and the Pirates.

In the mid-1950s Steve Canyon became guardian to Poteet Canyon. Just why she was sent to him was left unanswered for many years, along with how she was related to him. She went to Maumee University, then got a job in journalism, first at a local newspaper. At the nearby airfield, she became friends with Bitsy Beekman, who worked at a high-end magazine like Vogue. In the late-1960s to the late 1970s, more stories focused on Summer's son by her first marriage, Leighton Olson, Jr., who got involved with drugs, then went to Maumee University, now filled with radical antiwar types. He became steady with Stalky Schweisenberger while at Maumee U.

Caniff was intensely patriotic, and with Canyon's return to the military, the story began to revolve around Cold War intrigue and the responsibilities of American citizens. Despite this shift in tone, Caniff was able to maintain the picaresque quality of his globally set stories. During Christmas time, in Steve Canyon, as he did in Terry, Caniff made a special effort to remind readers of servicemen's sacrifices.

Milton Caniff with Carol Ohmart, model for Copper Calhoon, 1947

== Models ==
Caniff was famous for colorful villains and intriguing female characters, such as Madame Lynx and the lovely exiled ruler, Princess Snowflower. Madame Lynx was based on Madame Egelichi, the femme fatale spy played by Ilona Massey in the Marx Brothers movie Love Happy (1949). The character stirred Caniff's imagination so much that he hired Ilona Massey personally to pose for him. Besides casting Ilona Massey as Lynx, Caniff patterned Pipper the Piper after John F. Kennedy, and Miss Mizzou after either Marilyn Monroe or actress Bek Nelson. The character of Charlie Vanilla (who would frequently appear with an ice cream cone in hand) was based on Caniff's longtime friend Charles Russhon, a former photographer and U.S. Air Force lieutenant, who became a technical advisor on five James Bond films.

== Other media ==
Steve Canyon as it was seen in Chile

=== Cinema ===
In the late 1940s, producer David O. Selznick considered a Steve Canyon film series starring Guy Madison, but Madison's agent Henry Willson talked Selznick out of it.

=== Television ===
The strip was adapted into a filmed, half-hour television series of 34 episodes on NBC in 1958–59 (with reruns on ABC in 1960). Dean Fredericks played Canyon—a troubleshooter for the United States Air Force. Canyon spent the first part of the series traveling from base to base, before becoming the commanding officer stationed at the strip's fictitious Big Thunder Air Force Base in California. With the exception of General "Shanty" Towne (in the pilot episode), none of the other supporting characters from the newspaper strip appeared in the series.

From 2008 to 2009, the first 24 episodes were released on DVD; the remaining episodes were released on July 28, 2015.

=== Novels ===
A series of novels was published by Grosset & Dunlap in the 1950s. They were all written by Caniff, with illustrations by himself.

== Real-world depictions ==
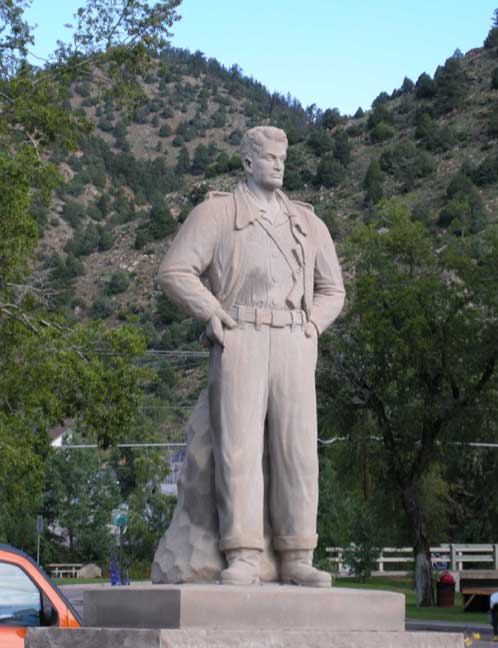
Steve Canyon statue in Idaho Springs, Colorado

A statue of Steve Canyon was erected in Idaho Springs, Colorado, and a nearby mountain canyon was renamed "Steve Canyon". A mosaic of Steve Canyon's ward, Poteet Canyon, stands in front of the city fire station in the town of Poteet, Texas.

The CIA/US Air Force covert air war in Laos during the Vietnam War was unofficially called the "Steve Canyon Program".

== Reprints ==
Harvey Comics reprinted the strip in a half-dozen 1948 comic books, and Dell Comics published seven issues of original stories (1953–1959) by former Caniff assistant Ray Bailey (who had anticipated Steve Canyon with his own Bruce Gentry about a charter pilot) in their Four Color series (numbers 519, 578, 641, 737, 804, 939, and 1033). Steve Canyon was reprinted by The Menomonee Falls Gazette, Kitchen Sink Press, and Comics Revue, with Hermes Press reprinting the comic book in 2011.

Kitchen Sink Press published Steve Canyon Magazine for 21 issues, until replacing it with trade paperback collections using the same numbering:

- Steve Canyon v.22 In Formosa's Dire Straits (1989, ISBN 0-87816-044-2, reprints Feb 8, 1955 to August 8, 1955)
- Steve Canyon v.23 The Scarlet Princess (1989, reprints August 9, 1955, to April 11, 1956)
- Steve Canyon v.24 Taps for 'Shanty' Town (1989, reprints April 12 to November 28, 1956)
- Steve Canyon v.25 Damma Exile (1991, ISBN 0-87816-061-2, reprints Nov 29, 1956 to Sept 24, 1957)
- Steve Canyon v.26 War Games (1992, ISBN 0-87816-066-3, reprints Sept 25, 1957, to April 7, 1958)

Kitchen Sink Press also published a one-shot Steve Canyon 3-D comic in June 1986 featuring an anaglyph 3D process by Ray Zone.

In 2006, Checker Book Publishing Group began releasing a year-by-year collection of Steve Canyon. Nine volumes were released before publication ceased:

- Steve Canyon: 1947 (ISBN 0-9710249-9-5)
- Steve Canyon: 1948 (ISBN 0-9741664-1-3)
- Steve Canyon: 1949 (ISBN 0-9710249-1-X, February 9, 1949, and February 18, 1950)
- Steve Canyon: 1950 (ISBN 1-933160-51-9, reprints January 29 to October 7, 1950)
- Steve Canyon: 1951 (ISBN 1-933160-10-1, reprints October 8, 1950, to Nov 14, 1951)
- Steve Canyon: 1952 (ISBN 1-933160-55-1, reprints April 9, 1952, to May 14, 1953)
- Steve Canyon: 1953 (ISBN 1-933160-57-8, reprints May 15, 1953, to August 5, 1954)
- Steve Canyon: 1954 (ISBN 1-933160-23-3, reprints August 6, 1954, to August 8, 1955)
- Steve Canyon: 1955 (ISBN 978-1-933160-73-3, reprints August 9, 1955, to 1956; new format)

In 2012, IDW Publishing began a new hardcover reprint series under their "The Library of American Comics" imprint.

- Steve Canyon v.1: 1947–48 (2012)
- Steve Canyon v.2: 1949–50 (2012)
- Steve Canyon v.3: 1951–52 (2013)
- Steve Canyon v.4: 1953–54 (2014)
- Steve Canyon v.5: 1955–56 (2014)
- Steve Canyon v.6: 1957–58 (2015)
- Steve Canyon v.7: 1959–60 (2016)
- Steve Canyon v.8: 1961–62 (2018)
- Steve Canyon v.9: 1963–64 (2019)
- Steve Canyon v.10: 1965–66 (2020)
- Steve Canyon v.11: 1967–68 (2021)
- Steve Canyon v.12: 1969–70 (2022)

== See also ==
- Raven Forward Air Controllers
- Don Winslow of the Navy
- Buck Danny, an ongoing Franco-Belgian comics series launched at virtually the same time, and also starring an American flying ace
