= A Kid for Two Farthings (film) =

1955 British film by Carol Reed

A Kid For Two Farthings
- Film poster
- Directed by: Carol Reed
- Screenplay by: Wolf Mankowitz
- Based on: A Kid for Two Farthings; 1953 novel by Wolf Mankowitz
- Produced by: Carol Reed
- Starring: Celia Johnson; Diana Dors; David Kossoff; Joe Robinson; Jonathan Ashmore
- Cinematography: Edward Scaife
- Edited by: Bert Bates
- Music by: Benjamin Frankel
- Production company: London Films
- Distributed by: Romulus Films
- Release date: 15 August 1955
- Running time: 96 minutes
- Country: United Kingdom
- Language: English
- Budget: £198,120

A Kid For Two Farthings is a 1955 British comedy-drama film directed by Carol Reed. The screenplay was adapted by Wolf Mankowitz from his 1953 novel of the same name. The title is a reference to the traditional Passover song, "Chad Gadya", which begins "One little goat which my father bought for two zuzim". At the end of the film, Mr. Kandinsky softly sings fragments of an English translation of the song.

It was one of the last films produced by Alexander Korda before his death.

== Plot ==
A small boy – Joe – buys a unicorn, in fact a sickly goat, with just one twisted horn in the middle of its forehead. This, according to a local tailor, Kandinsky, will bring everyone good fortune.

The film has a haunting last image, of Kandinsky carrying the tiny body of the "unicorn" to the graveyard, whilst passing in the opposite direction is a Torah-reading Rabbi pushing a horn gramophone, a character that appears in the background several times during the film.

== Cast ==
- Celia Johnson as Joanna
- Diana Dors as Sonia
- David Kossoff as Mr. Kandinsky
- Joe Robinson as Sam
- Jonathan Ashmore as Joe
- Brenda De Banzie as 'Lady' Ruby
- Vera Day as Mimi
- Primo Carnera as Python Macklin
- Lou Jacobi as Blackie Isaacs
- Irene Handl as Mrs. Abramowitz
- Danny Green as Bason
- Sydney Tafler as Madam Rita
- Sid James as Ice Berg
- Daphne Anderson as Dora
- Harry Baird as Jamaica
- Joseph Tomelty as Vagrant
- Harold Berens as Oliver

== Production ==
=== Development ===
Film rights to the novel were purchased by Carol Reed, who had made another film featuring a child protagonist, The Fallen Idol, a few years previously. After making The Man Between, Reed wanted to do something smaller scale.

Finance came in part from the Woolf Brothers. The movie was one of four films the Woolfs financed for Korda via Lloyds bank, being worth more than £1 million (the others were Storm Over the Nile, Richard III and Summertime).

The role of the six-year old went to Jonathan Ashmore. It was one of a number of British films around this time with a child protagonist.

The New York Times called the casting of Diana Dors "a surprise choice" because "she has made no films of consequence before and has usually been thought of as a kind of junior Marilyn Monroe."

=== Shooting ===
Filming started in June 1954. It took place at the studio and on location at Petticoat Lane in London. It was Carol Reed's first movie in colour.

Sidney Gilliat said he wanted to direct the film. He later said "I never would have thought of making it a non Jewish subject. But Carol managed to make the whole thing without a single reference to the character's background or religion at any point. And it was a very Jewish story. It lost a tremendous amount through not being a Jewish story." Gilliat also felt "all his little boys turned out to be beautifully well behaved prep school boys. "

== Reception ==
=== Critical response ===
Reviews for the film were mixed. Reed said, "I loved that book. The film was alright in parts but not in others. It cost very little money but did well."

Filmink said it contained " an archetypal Dors performance in many ways – she's down-to-earth, warm, kind, the best looking girl in a low-rent area (glamorous, but "East End" glamorous)."

=== Awards ===
A Kid for Two Farthings was nominated for a Golden Palm at the 1955 Cannes Film Festival.

=== Box office ===
According to the Monthly Film Herald The film was the 9th most popular movie at the British box office in 1955, after The Dam Busters, White Christmas, Doctor at Sea, The Colditz Story, Seven Brides for Seven Brothers, Above Us the Waves, One Good Turn, and Raising a Riot. The film's popularity helped exhibitors vote Diana Dors the 9th most popular British star in British films (after Dirk Bogarde, John Mills, Norman Wisdom, Alastair Sim, Kenneth More, Jack Hawkins, Richard Todd and Michael Redgrave, and in front of Alec Guinness.) According to Kinematograph Weekly it was a "money maker" at the British box office in 1955.

== Notes ==
- Wapshott, Nicholas (1990). The man between : a biography of Carol Reed. Chatto & Windus.
