= A Kid for Two Farthings (novel) =

1953 novel

- First edition
- Author: Wolf Mankowitz
- Language: English
- Genre: Novel
- Publisher: André Deutsch
- Publication date: 1953
- Publication place: United Kingdom
- Media type: Print (Hardcover)
- Pages: 119 pp

A Kid for Two Farthings is a 1953 novel by the British writer Wolf Mankowitz, based on the author's experiences of growing up within a Jewish community in London's East End.

The title is a reference to the traditional Passover song, Chad Gadya, which begins "One little goat which my father bought for two zuzim". At the end of the film version, Mr Kandinsky softly sings fragments of an English translation of the song.

== Plot introduction ==
In an East London working class community of small shops, open-air vendors and flea-marketers, Joe, a small boy, lives with his mother, Rebecca, who works rooms above the Kandinsky tailor shop. Joe is innocently and earnestly determined to help realize the wishes of his poor, hard-working neighbours. Hearing from Mr Kandinsky the tale that a captured unicorn will grant any wish, Joe uses his accumulated pocket change to buy a kid with an emerging horn, believing it to be a unicorn. His subsequent efforts to make dreams come true exemplify the power of hope and will amidst hardship.

== Adaptations ==
A film version directed by Carol Reed was released in 1955 with an adapted screenplay by Mankowitz. A musical play based on the novel was presented at the Bridewell Theatre in London in 1996 by the Mercury Workshop, starring Ron Moody as Kandinsky. Music was by Cyril Ornadel with lyrics by Philip Glassborow and book by Glassborow and Robert Meadwell.
