= Wolf Mankowitz =

English writer, playwright and screenwriter (1924–1998)

- Born: Cyril Wolf Mankowitz; 7 November 1924; Spitalfields, London, England
- Died: 20 May 1998 (aged 73); County Cork, Ireland
- Resting place: Golders Green Crematorium
- Education: Downing College, Cambridge
- Occupations: Writer; playwright; screenwriter
- Spouse: Ann Seligmann (m. 1944)
- Children: 4, including Gered Mankowitz
- Writing career
- Language: English
- Genres: Screenwriting, theatre

Cyril Wolf Mankowitz (7 November 1924 – 20 May 1998) was an English writer, playwright and screenwriter. He is particularly known for four novels— Make Me an Offer (1952), A Kid for Two Farthings (1953), My Old Man's a Dustman and Expresso Bongo (1958) — and other plays, historical studies, and the screenplays for many successful films which have received awards, including the Oscar, BAFTA and the Cannes Grand Prix.

== Early life ==
Mankowitz was born on Fashion Street in Spitalfields in the East End of London, the heart of London's Jewish community until the 1940s, of Russian-Jewish descent. He was educated at East Ham Grammar School for Boys and Downing College, Cambridge, where he read English under F. R. Leavis.

== Career ==
Mankowitz originally worked as an antiques dealer. He specialised in porcelain, and in 1953 published a book on the Portland Vase. His first book, Make Me an Offer, was based on his experiences in the antiques trade.

The area in which he grew up provided Mankowitz with the material for his most successful book, A Kid for Two Farthings (1953). This was adapted as a film by the director Carol Reed in 1955; Mankowitz wrote the screenplay. In 1958 he wrote the book for the West End musical Expresso Bongo which was adapted into a film starring Cliff Richard and Laurence Harvey the following year. Its director Val Guest suggested to Harvey that it might be a good idea to model his film role of Johnny Jackson on Mankowitz's own character, and so Harvey arranged a couple of lunches with the unsuspecting writer to study him at close hand, resulting in the character on film sounding something like Mankowitz. Mankowitz himself appears in the film's opening credit sequence, wearing a sandwich board that bears his writer credit. In 1958 he wrote the scripts for the ITV sitcom East End, West End set in London's East End and starring Sid James.

Mankowitz's script for Anthony Asquith's film The Millionairess (1960), based on the 1936 play by George Bernard Shaw and starring Sophia Loren and Peter Sellers, was nominated for a BAFTA Award for best screenplay. Another screenplay at this time was a further collaboration with Val Guest for the science fiction film The Day the Earth Caught Fire (1961).

In 1962, Mankowitz offered to introduce his friend Cubby Broccoli to Harry Saltzman, holder of the film rights to James Bond, when Broccoli mentioned he desired to make the Bond series his next film project. Broccoli and Saltzman then formed Eon Productions and began co-producing the first Bond film, Dr No, for which Mankowitz was hired as one of the screenwriters. After viewing early rushes, Mankowitz feared that the film would be a disaster and damage his reputation, and insisted on having his name removed from the film's credits. He later collaborated on the screenplay for the non-Eon 1967 Bond movie Casino Royale. He wrote the script for Yorkshire Television's serial Dickens of London (1976) and the book of the same name based on his research when writing the series.

Mankowitz was an original investor in the Partisan Coffee House, a meeting place for the New Left just off Soho Square, which functioned from 1958 to 1962. He also launched the White Elephant Club on Curzon St, Mayfair, in 1960. During the late 1960s, he was part-owner of the Pickwick Club in Great Newport Street, off Charing Cross Road in central London.

Mankowitz also had a reputation as a playwright. Several of his plays started as either films or television plays. His plays include The Samson Riddle, The Bespoke Overcoat, The Hebrew Lesson (for the stage premiere it was retitled The Irish Hebrew Lesson), It Should Happen to a Dog and The Mighty Hunter.

== Personal life ==
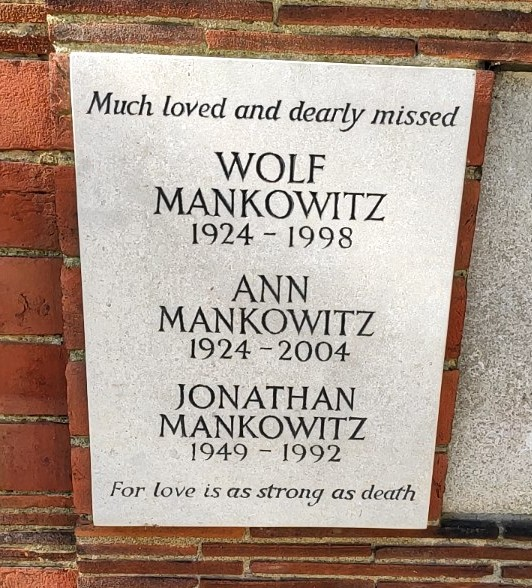
Commemorative plaque dedicated to Mankowitz at Golders Green Crematorium

In 1944, Mankowitz married Ann Seligmann, a psychoanalyst; the couple met at Cambridge University. They had four sons; the eldest of whom, Gered, is a photographer. His sister, Barbara Mankowitz, was eminent in the china trade in London.

Mankowitz died of cancer in 1998 in County Cork, Ireland, aged 73; his ashes are at the Golders Green Crematorium.

Files placed in the public domain during August 2010 revealed that for a decade after the Second World War, Mankowitz was suspected by security service MI5 of being a Soviet agent due to visiting the Soviet Consulate in London and his wife's communist beliefs. The investigation was dropped after he cancelled a visit to Russia in 1957.
