= List of Hermes Press publications =

Hermes Press is an American comic book publisher. They are known, in part, for their reprints of The Phantom, as well as other historical titles such as Buck Rogers, Brenda Starr, and Dark Shadows. Hermes Press also publishes original content such as Scratch9.

This is a list of Hermes Press publications.

== Titles ==
=== A ===
Title	Printed	Notes
Abby: Curled Up and on a Roll	2022	
The Adventurous Decade: Comic Strips In The Thirties	2005	
Alex Raymond: An Artistic Journey: Adventure, Intrigue, and Romance	2016	
Alex Toth's Zorro: The Complete Dell Comics Adventures	2013	
Andru & Esposito's Get Lost!	2008	
Andru & Esposito's Partners for Life	2006	

=== B ===
Title	Printed	Notes
Babes in Arms	2017	written by Trina Robbins
Bear with Me	2022	
Behind the Silver Screen	2009	
Bernie Wrightson: Art and Designs for the Gang of Seven Animation Studio	2017	
The Best of Alex Toth and John Buscema's Roy Rogers Comics	2020	
The Best of John Buscema's Roy Rogers Comics	2023	
Bill Sienkiewicz: Precursor	2002	
Brenda Starr: The Complete Pre-Code Comics Volume 1: Good Girls, Bondage, and Other Fine Things	2013	
Brenda Starr: The Complete Pre-Code Comics Volume 2: Bad Girls, Cheesecake, and Other Delectable Things	2015	
Brenda Starr, Reporter: The Collected Daily and Sunday Newspaper Strips Volume 1	2012	
Buck Rogers	2014	Free Comic Book Day Edition
Buck Rogers in the 25th Century #1	2013	by Howard Chaykin
Buck Rogers in the 25th Century #2	2013	by Howard Chaykin
Buck Rogers in the 25th Century #3	2013	by Howard Chaykin
Buck Rogers in the 25th Century #4	2014	by Howard Chaykin
Buck Rogers in 25th Century Vol 1 Grievous Angels	2014	Graphic Novel
Buck Rogers in the 25th Century: The Complete Newspaper Dailies, Vol. 1: 1929-1930	2008	
Buck Rogers in the 25th Century: The Complete Newspaper Dailies, Vol. 2: 1930-1932	2009	
Buck Rogers in the 25th Century: The Complete Newspaper Dailies, Vol. 3: 1932-1934	2010	
Buck Rogers in the 25th Century: The Complete Newspaper Dailies, Vol. 4: 1934-1936	2010	
Buck Rogers in The 25th Century: The Complete Newspaper Dailies, Vol. 5, 1935-1936	2011	
Buck Rogers In The 25th Century: The Complete Newspaper Dailies, Vol. 6, 1936-1938	2012	
Buck Rogers In The 25th Century: The Complete Newspaper Dailies, Vol. 7, 1938-1940	2013	
Buck Rogers in The 25th Century: The Complete Newspaper Dailies, Vol. 8, 1940-1941	2013	
Buck Rogers In The 25th Century: The Complete Newspaper Sundays Vol. 1 1930-1933	2012	
Buck Rogers in the 25th Century: The Complete Newspaper Sundays Vol. 2 1933-1937	2012	
Buck Rogers in the 25th Century: The Complete Newspaper Sundays Vol. 3 1937-1940	2015	
Buck Rogers in the 25th Century: The Western Publishing Years Volume 1	2013	
Buck Rogers in the 25th Century: The Gray Morrow Years Volume 1 (1979-1981)	2013	

=== C ===
Title	Printed	Notes
Cheap Thrills	2007	Written by Ron Goulart
Creators of the Superheroes	2011	

=== D ===
Title	Printed	Notes
The Dark Shadows Coloring Book	2023	
Dark Shadows: The Complete Paperback Library Reprint Book 1	2020	
Dark Shadows: The Complete Paperback Library Reprint Book 2	2020	Limited Edition Variant signed by Alexandra Moltke
Dark Shadows: The Complete Paperback Library Reprint Book 3	2020	
Dark Shadows: The Complete Paperback Library Reprint Book 4	2020	
Dark Shadows: The Complete Paperback Library Reprint Book 5	2020	
Dark Shadows: The Complete Paperback Library Reprint Book 6	2020	
Dark Shadows: The Complete Paperback Library Reprint Book 7	2020	
Dark Shadows: The Complete Paperback Library Reprint Book 8	2020	
Dark Shadows: The Complete Paperback Library Reprint Book 9	2020	
Dark Shadows: The Complete Paperback Library Reprint Book 10	2020	
Dark Shadows: The Complete Paperback Library Reprint Book 11	2020	
Dark Shadows: The Complete Paperback Library Reprint Book 12	2020	
Dark Shadows: The Complete Paperback Library Reprint Book 13	2021	
Dark Shadows: The Complete Paperback Library Reprint Book 14	2021	
Dark Shadows: The Complete Paperback Library Reprint Book 15	2021	
Dark Shadows: The Complete Paperback Library Reprint Book 16	2021	Signed Limited Edition Variant signed by David Selby
Dark Shadows: The Complete Paperback Library Reprint Book 17	2021	
Dark Shadows: The Complete Paperback Library Reprint Book 18	2021	
Dark Shadows: The Complete Paperback Library Reprint Book 19	2021	
Dark Shadows: The Complete Paperback Library Reprint Book 20	2021	
Dark Shadows: The Complete Paperback Library Reprint Book 21	2021	
Dark Shadows: The Complete Paperback Library Reprint Book 22	2021	
Dark Shadows: The Complete Paperback Library Reprint Book 23	2021	
Dark Shadows: The Complete Paperback Library Reprint Book 24	2021	
Dark Shadows: The Complete Paperback Library Reprint Book 25	2022	
Dark Shadows: The Complete Paperback Library Reprint Book 26	2022	
Dark Shadows: The Complete Paperback Library Reprint Book 27	2022	
Dark Shadows: The Complete Paperback Library Reprint Book 28	2022	
Dark Shadows: The Complete Paperback Library Reprint Book 29	2022	
Dark Shadows: The Complete Paperback Library Reprint Book 30	2023	
Dark Shadows: The Complete Paperback Library Reprint Book 31	2023	
Dark Shadows: The Complete Paperback Library Reprint Book 32	2022	Signed Limited Edition Variant signed by Nancy Barrett
Dark Shadows: The Complete Series Volume 1	2010	
Dark Shadows: The Complete Series Volume 1	2021	Second edition
Dark Shadows: The Complete Series Volume 2	2011	
Dark Shadows: The Complete Series Volume 3	2012	
Dark Shadows: The Complete Series Volume 4	2012	
Dark Shadows: The Complete Series Volume 5	2012	
Dark Shadows: The Best of the Original Gold Key Series	2012	
Dark Shadows: The Original Series Story Digest	2012	
Dark Shadows the Complete Newspaper Strips	2018	Limited edition variant signed by Lara Parker
DC Comics Before Superman: Major Malcolm Wheeler-Nicholson's Pulp Comics	2018	Limited Edition variant signed by Jim Steranko
Dethany and the Other Clique	2021	
Ditko Shrugged: The Uncompromising life of the artist behind Spider-Man and the rise of Marvel Comics	2020	Nominated for the 2021 Eisner Awards
Doris Day: Images of a Hollywood Icon	2022	

=== E ===
Title	Printed	Notes
The Art of Earl Oliver Hurst	2005	
Executive Outcomes	2015	based on true events

=== F ===
Title	Printed	Notes
Filmed In Supermarionation: A History Of The Future	2010	
The Future Was F.A.B.: The Art Of Mike Trim	2006	
Frank Frazetta: Art and Remembrances	2013	
Frank Thorne's Battling Beauties	2017	
Frank Thorne's Complete Ghita of Alizarr	2021	
Frank Thorne’s Ghita, An Erotic Treasury Archival Edition Volume I	2017	with limited edition signed by Frank Thorne
Frank Thorne’s Ghita, An Erotic Treasury Archival Edition Volume II	2019	with limited edition signed by Frank Thorne
Frank Thorne's Complete Iron Devil	2023	
Frank Thorne's Lann	2019	
Frank Thorne's Ribit!	2019	

=== G ===
Title	Printed	Notes
Gil Kane : The Art of the Comics	2001	
Gil Kane: Art and Interviews	2002	
Good Girl Art	2008	Featured in Vanity Fair
Gladys Parker: A Life in Comics, A Passion for Fashion	2022	2023 Eisner Award Nominee
Gray Morrow's Orion	2012	

=== H ===
Title	Printed	Notes
How to Alienate Friends and Avoid People: The Lazy Goth Method	2020	with Limited Edition variant signed by artist

=== I ===
Title	Printed	Notes
If UR Stabby	2021	
Infected by Art Volume Two	2014	
Infected by Art Volume Three	2015	
Infected by Art Volume Four	2016	

=== J ===
Title	Printed	Notes
James Bond: The History Of The Illustrated 007	2008	by Alan Porter
The Art of Jim Davis' Garfield	2016	with intro by R.C. Harvey
Jim Davis’ Garfield: The Original Art Daily and Sunday Archive	2017	with intro by Jim Davis
Joe Chiodo Artwork: Shape, Color and Form	2007	
Joe Chiodo Drawings And Paintings 2008	2008	
Joe Chiodo's How To Draw And Paint Pin-Ups	2006	
Joe Chiodo: Sketches, Drawings & Paintings	2006	
John Buscema: The Michelangelo of Comics	2011	
Johnny Hazard The Newspaper Dailies 1944-1945 Volume 1	2011	
Johnny Hazard The Newspaper Dailies 1945-1946 Volume 2	2012	
Johnny Hazard The Newspaper Dailies 1947-1949 Volume 3	2014	
Johnny Hazard The Newspaper Dailies 1949-1951 Volume 4	2015	
Johnny Hazard The Newspaper Dailies 1951-1952 Volume 5	2017	
Johnny Hazard The Newspaper Dailies 1952-1954 Volume 6	2017	
Johnny Hazard The Newspaper Dailies 1954-1956 Volume 7	2019	
Johnny Hazard The Newspaper Dailies Volume 8	2020	
Johnny Hazard The Newspaper Dailies 1957-1959 Volume 9	2022	
Johnny Hazard The Newspaper Dailies 1959-1961 Volume 10	2023	
Johnny Hazard Sundays Archive: Full Size Tabloids 1944-1946	2019	
Jaro Fabry: The Art of Fashion, Style, And Hollywood In The 1930s - 1940s	2008	

=== L ===
Title	Printed	Notes
Land Of The Giants The Complete Series	2010	

=== M ===
Title	Printed	Notes
Mandrake the Magician The Complete King Years: Volume One	2015	
Mandrake the Magician The Complete King Years: Volume Two	2016	
Mike Hammer: The complete Dailies and Sundays Volume 1	2013	
Milton Caniff's Male Call	2011	
Mother Goth Rhymes	2019	
My Fab Years! Sylvia Anderson	2007	
My Favorite Martian: The Complete Series Volume One	2011	
Murphy Anderson's Buck Rogers in the 25th Century: The Complete Sunday's: 1958-1959	2014	

=== N ===
Title	Printed	Notes
Nuke 'Em! Classic Cold War Comics Celebrating the End of the World	2019	With intro by Arne Flaten

=== P ===
Title	Printed	Notes
Walt Kelly's Peter Wheat the Complete Series: Volume One	2017	with Limited Edition variant cover
The Phantom Issue # 1	2014	Has variant covers 1a, 1b, 1c
The Phantom Issue # 2	2015	
The Phantom Issue # 3	2015	
The Phantom Issue # 4	2015	
The Phantom Issue # 5	2015	
The Phantom Issue #6	2016	
The Phantom: President Kennedy's Mission #1	2017	with two variants, written by Ron Goulart
The Phantom: President Kennedy's Mission Graphic Novel	2019	
The Phantom Special #1	2015	FCBD edition
The Phantom: Danger in the Forbidden City	2016	graphic novel
The Phantom Sundays Archive: Full Size Half Pages 1939-1942	2015	
The Phantom: The Complete Avon Books Volume 1	2016	
The Phantom: The Complete Avon Books Volume 2	2016	
The Phantom: The Complete Avon Books Volume 3	2017	
The Phantom: The Complete Avon Books Volume 4	2017	
The Phantom: The Complete Avon Books Volume 5	2018	
The Phantom: The Complete Avon Books Volume 6	2018	
The Phantom: The Complete Avon Books Volume 7	2018	
The Phantom: The Complete Avon Books Volume 8	2018	
The Phantom: The Complete Avon Books Volume 9	2019	
The Phantom: The Complete Avon Books Volume 10	2019	
The Phantom: The Complete Avon Books Volume 11	2019	
The Phantom: The Complete Avon Books Volume 12	2019	
The Phantom: The Complete Avon Books Volume 13	2020	
The Phantom: The Complete Avon Books Volume 14	2020	
The Phantom: The Complete Avon Books Volume 15	2020	
The Complete DC Comic’s Phantom Volume 1	2021	
The Complete DC Comic’s Phantom Volume 2	2022	
The Complete DC Comic’s Phantom Volume 3	2022	
The Phantom: The Complete Don Newton Charlton Years	2018	
The Phantom: The Complete Jim Aparo Charlton Years	2017	
The Phantom: The Complete Newspaper Dailies Volume 1: 1936-1937	2010	Out of print
The Phantom: The Complete Newspaper Dailies Volume 1: 1936-1937	2014	Second Printing
The Phantom: The Complete Newspaper Dailies Volume 2: 1937-1939	2010	
The Phantom: The Complete Newspaper Dailies Volume 3: 1939-1940	2011	
The Phantom: The Complete Newspaper Dailies Volume 4: 1940-1943	2013	
The Phantom: The Complete Newspaper Dailies Volume 5: 1943-1944	2013	
The Phantom: The Complete Newspaper Dailies Volume 6: 1944-1946	2013	
The Phantom: The Complete Newspaper Dailies Volume 7: 1946-1947	2015	
The Phantom: The Complete Newspaper Dailies Volume 8: 1947-1949	2015	
The Phantom: The Complete Newspaper Dailies Volume 9: 1949-1950	2016	
The Phantom: The Complete Newspaper Dailies and Sundays Volume 10: 1950-1951	2016	
The Phantom: The Complete Newspaper Dailies Volume 11: 1951-1953	2017	
The Phantom: The Complete Newspaper Dailies Volume 12: 1953-1955	2017	
The Phantom: The Complete Newspaper Dailies Volume 13: 1955-1956	2018	
The Phantom: The Complete Newspaper Dailies Volume 14: 1956-1957	2018	
The Phantom: The Complete Newspaper Dailies Volume 15: 1957-1959	2019	
The Phantom: The Complete Newspaper Dailies Volume 16: 1959-1961	2019	
The Phantom: The Complete Newspaper Dailies Volume 17: 1961-1962	2019	with Limited Edition variant signed by Sy Barry
The Phantom: The Complete Newspaper Dailies Volume 18: 1962-1964	2020	
The Phantom: The Complete Newspaper Dailies Volume 19: 1964-1966	2020	
The Phantom: The Complete Newspaper Dailies Volume 20: 1966-1968	2020	
The Phantom: The Complete Newspaper Dailies Volume 21: 1968-1969	2021	
The Phantom: The Complete Newspaper Dailies Volume 22: 1969-1971	2021	
The Phantom: The Complete Newspaper Dailies Volume 23: 1971-1973	2021	
The Phantom: The Complete Newspaper Dailies Volume 24: 1973-1974	2021	
The Phantom: The Complete Newspaper Dailies Volume 25: 1974-1975	2022	
The Phantom: The Complete Newspaper Dailies Volume 26: 1975-1977	2023	
The Phantom: The Complete Newspaper Dailies Volume 27: 1977-1978	2023	
The Phantom: The Complete Newspaper Dailies Volume 28: 1978-1980	2023	
The Phantom: The Complete Newspaper Dailies Volume 29: 1980-1982	2023	
The Phantom: The Complete Newspaper Dailies Volume 30: 1982-1984	2023	
The Phantom The Complete Series: The Charlton Years Volume 1	2012	
The Phantom The Complete Series: The Charlton Years Volume 2	2013	
The Phantom The Complete Series: The Charlton Years Volume 3	2014	
The Phantom The Complete Series: The Charlton Years Volume 4	2015	
The Phantom The Complete Series: The Charlton Years Volume 5	2016	
The Phantom The Complete Series: The Gold Key Years Volume 1	2011	
The Phantom The Complete Series: The Gold Key Years Volume 2	2012	
The Phantom The Complete Series: The Gold Key Years Volume 1	2023	Second Edition
The Phantom The Complete Series: The Gold Key Years Volume 2	2023	Second Edition
The Phantom The Complete Series: The King Years	2012	
The Phantom: The Complete Sundays Volume 1 (1939-1942)	2012	
The Phantom: The Complete Sundays Volume 2 (1942-1945)	2014	
The Phantom: The Complete Sundays Volume 3 (1945-1949)	2016	
The Phantom: The Complete Sundays Volume 4 (1949-1952)	2018	
The Phantom: The Complete Sundays Volume 5 (1952-1956)	2018	
The Phantom: The Complete Sundays Volume 6 (1956-1960)	2019	
The Phantom: The Complete Sundays Volume 7 (1960-1963)	2020	
The Phantom: The Complete Sundays Volume 8 (1963-1966)	2020	
The Phantom: The Complete Sundays Volume 9 (1966-1970)	2021	
The Psychedelic Rock Art of Carl Lundgren	2015	Has a limited edition variant cover
Walt Kelly's Pogo: The Complete Dell Comics Volume 1	2014	
Walt Kelly's Pogo: The Complete Dell Comics Volume 2	2014	
Walt Kelly's Pogo: The Complete Dell Comics Volume 3	2015	
Walt Kelly's Pogo: The Complete Dell Comics Volume 4	2016	
Walt Kelly's Pogo: The Complete Dell Comics Volume 5	2017	
Walt Kelly's Pogo: The Complete Dell Comics Volume 6	2018	

=== R ===
Title	Printed	Notes
Roy Rogers: The Collected Daily and Sunday Newspaper Strips	2011	

=== S ===
Title	Printed	Notes
Scratch9	2014	(Free Comic Book Day Edition)
Scratch9 Issue 1	2012	(Free Comic Book Day Edition)
Scratch9: Cat Tails #1	2013	
Scratch9: Cat Tails #2	2013	
Scratch9: Cat of Nine Worlds #1	2014	With variant cover by Kevin Eastman
Scratch9: Cat of Nine Worlds	2015	graphic novel
Sentient #1	2016	
Silver Age: The Second Generation of Comic Artists	2005	by Daniel Herman
Sky Masters of the Space Force: the Complete Dailies 1958-1961	2017	
Sky Masters of the Space Force: the Complete Dailies 1958-1961	2020	Softcover reprint
Sparrow and Crowe #1: The Demoniac of Los Angeles	2012	
Sparrow and Crowe #2: The Demoniac of Los Angeles	2013	
Sparrow and Crowe #3: The Demoniac of Los Angeles	2014	
Star Hawks The Complete Series	2004	
Star Trek: A Comic Book History	2009	written by Alan J. Porter
Steve Canyon: The Complete Series Volume 1	2011	

=== T ===
Title	Printed	Notes
Tails: Book One	2012	
Terry and the Pirates: The George Wunder Years Volume 1 (1946-1948)	2014	
Terry and the Pirates: The George Wunder Years Volume 2 (1948-1949)	2015	
Time Tunnel: The Complete Series	2009	

=== U ===
Title	Printed	Notes
The Unseen Art of Hollywood Storyboards	2021	

=== V ===
Title	Printed	Notes
Voyage To The Bottom Of The Sea: The Complete Series Volume 1	2009	
Voyage To The Bottom Of The Sea: The Complete Series Volume 2	2010	

=== W ===
Title	Printed	Notes
Walt Kelly: The Life and Art of the Creator of Pogo	2012	
The Worlds Of Matt Busch	2008	
Works of Art: Joe Chiodo	2003	

=== Z ===
Title	Printed	Notes
Zorro: The Complete Dell Pre-Code Comics	2014	
