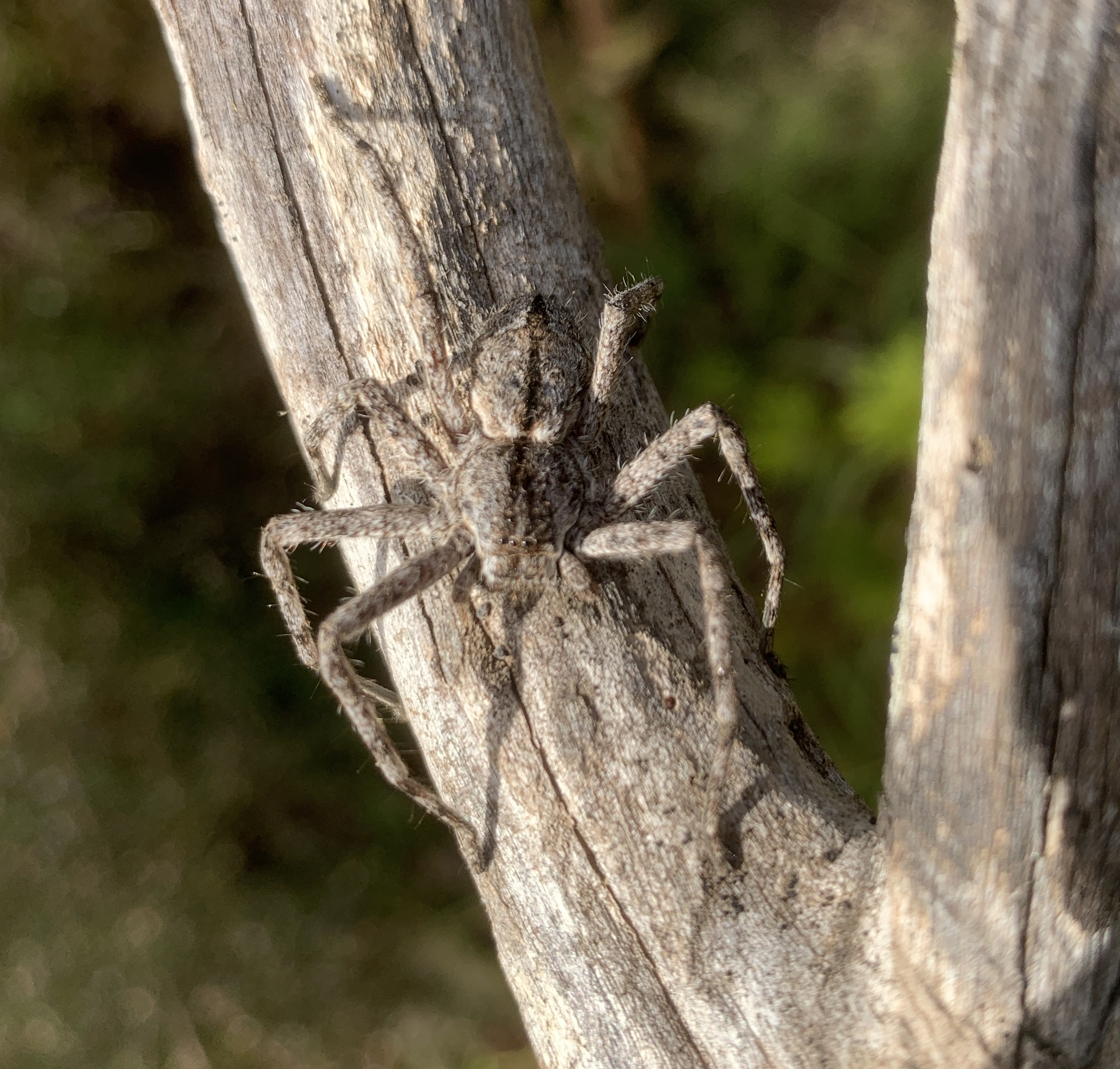
- P. regina from New South Wales, Australia

Scientific classification
- Kingdom: Animalia
- Phylum: Arthropoda
- Subphylum: Chelicerata
- Class: Arachnida
- Order: Araneae
- Infraorder: Araneomorphae
- Family: Sparassidae
- Genus: Pediana
- Species: P. regina

Binomial name
- Pediana regina Koch, 1875

Synonyms
- Heteropoda regina, Koch, 1875; Polydamna regina, Thorell, 1881

= Pediana regina =

Species of huntsman spider

Pediana regina, also referred to as the Queen of the huntsmen or the bark huntsman, is a species of Sparassid (huntsman) spider belonging to the genus Pediana that occurs throughout Australia in Victoria, New South Wales, Queensland, and Western Australia.

== Description ==
Pediana regina is a relatively large huntsman, with adult females exhibiting a leg span of 25 mm (0.98 in) and adult males exhibiting a leg span of 19 mm (0.75 in). Covered in filiform hairs or trichobothria, P. regina are typically a dull tan or brownish grey in colour with a deeper brown or tawny shade that bands or freckles the legs and sporadically marks the rest of the body. A dark stripe (sometimes referred to as a cardiac mark among spiders) runs laterally down the spider's dorsum, ceasing at the slope of the forehead and eyes. The abdomen is bulbous and oval-shaped and the prosoma is broad, tapering gently towards the front of the face and chelicerae. The legs do not curve forward as extremely as other huntsmen species and the two foremost legs are marginally longer than the other legs, a characteristic feature of the Deleninae subfamily the species belongs to, and the closely related Heteropodinae subfamily.

=== Morphological differences from other Deleninae ===
Pediana and P. regina can be easily distinguished from other huntsmen genera, chiefly Isopedella and Holconia, by morphological differences. Pediana males lack sclerotised conductor bases, delenine tegular apophysis, and a tegular flange, while Pediana females lack epigynal sclerite (though they still possess an epigyne). These morphological differences can be used also to distinguish Pediana from Isopeda; however, Beregama, a genus that was derived from Isopeda, possess the same characteristics of Pediana. P. Regina is the only member of its subfamily to possess a procurved posterior eye row.

== Taxonomy ==
Pediana was first described by French naturalist and entomologist, Eugène Louis Simon (1848–1924) in 1880 as a genus of the huntsmen family Sparassidae in his 1880 article on the taxonomy of huntsmen spiders, Révision de la famille des Sparassidae (Arachnides). P. regina was initially described as Heteropoda regina by German arachnologist and entomologist, Ludwig Carl Christian Koch (1825–1908), who described the species in his book, Die Arachniden Australiens, nach der Natur beschrieben und abgebildet [Erster Theil, Lieferung 12-16]. The species' genus was changed from Heteropoda to Pediana in 1880 by Simon who believed that the species did not fit the key characteristics of Heteropoda, making P. regina the type species of the genus. The synonym Polydamna regina also exists for the species (Thorell, 1881).

Pediana regina is often commonly referred to as the Queen of huntsmen spider or the bark huntsmen (the latter referring to the species' tendency to hide beneath bark rather than being indicative of a vocalisation as in barking spiders). The former is likely derived from the Latin word regina which is translated as "Queen".

== Behaviour and diet ==
Pediana regina can be found hiding under loose bark in eucalyptus forests, favouring the bark at the bases of trees or old stumps and logs. P. regina will also nest under bark. They can oftentimes be found perched on trees, stumps, and logs, using their colouration to camouflage as they hunt. As all huntsmen spiders, P. regina hunts for food rather than building webs to catch prey. They are known to hunt and eat bark-dwelling insects and other smaller spider species. The species is the sole member of Deleninae to be diurnal, hunting during the day. The diurnal lifestyle of the species may owe to its similarly unique possession of a procurved posterior eye row, absent in other Delenine huntsmen.
