= List of people from Missoula, Montana =

This following people are natives of or lived in Missoula, Montana, but not exclusively as students at the University of Montana.

| Name | Notability | Association | Category |
|---|---|---|---|
| Harry F. Adams | University of Montana track and field head coach for over 35 years | Resident | Athletics |
| Steve Albini | Musician (Big Black, Shellac), music producer | Raised | Performing arts |
| Aimee Allen | Singer, songwriter | Born and raised | Performing arts |
| William M. Allen | President of Boeing, 1945–1985 | Born and raised | Business |
| Jeff Ament | Bass guitarist for Pearl Jam | Resident | Performing arts |
| Eden Atwood | Jazz singer | Resident | Performing arts |
| Courtney Babcock | Champion middle-distance runner | Resident | Athletics |
| Dorothy Baker | Author | Born | Literature |
| Max Baucus | Montana's longest serving U.S. senator | Resident, state representative | Politics |
| Eric Bergoust | Olympic gold medalist in men's freestyle aerial skiing | Born and raised | Athletics |
| David Berkoff | Two-time Olympic gold medalist in men's swimming | Resident | Athletics |
| Judith Blegen | Opera soprano | Raised | Performing arts |
| Judy Blunt | Author | Resident | Literature |
| Bill Bowers | Mime artist | Born and raised | Performing arts |
| Mark Britton | Internet executive, venture capitalist and lawyer | Raised | Business |
| Scott Michael Campbell | Actor | Born | Entertainment |
| Dana Carvey | Actor | Born | Entertainment |
| James Crumley | Author | Resident | Literature |
| Jerry Daniels | CIA agent in Laos; humanitarian | Resident | Government |
| Gene Davis | NCAA wrestling champion and Olympic bronze medalist in freestyle wrestling | Born and raised | Athletics |
| Joseph M. Dixon | U.S. senator, governor of Montana | Resident | Politics |
| John Elway | Pro Football Hall of Fame quarterback | Resident | Athletics |
| Leif Erickson | Montana Supreme Court justice, 1936–1946 | Resident | Politics |
| Troy Evans | Actor | Born | Entertainment |
| Jesse Tyler Ferguson | Actor | Born | Entertainment |
| Dan Flores | Historian | Resident | Academics |
| Mayhew Foster | French Legion of Honor Chevalier recipient | Resident | Military |
| Hank Green | YouTuber, science communicator, novelist, and entrepreneur | Resident | Academics, entertainment |
| Harry Haines | Judge on the U.S. Tax Court | Resident | Politics |
| Leroy Hood | Biologist | Born and raised | Science |
| Dave Johnson | Olympic bronze medalist in decathlon | Raised | Athletics |
| "Wild Bill" Kelly | Member of College Football Hall of Fame | Raised | Athletics |
| Larry Krystkowiak | Basketball coach | Born and raised | Athletics |
| Jason Lamy-Chappuis | Olympic gold medalist for France | Born | Athletics |
| Jason Lutes | Comic book writer and artist | Raised | Art |
| David Lynch | Filmmaker | Born | Entertainment |
| Norman Maclean | Author | Resident | Literature |
| Mike Mansfield | U.S. Senate majority leader, ambassador to Japan | Resident | Politics |
| Bob Marshall | Wilderness activist | Resident | Activism |
| David Maslanka | Composer | Resident | Performing arts |
| Washington J. McCormick | U.S. representative | Born and raised | Politics |
| Neil McMahon | Author | Resident | Literature |
| John Melcher | U.S. senator | Resident | Politics |
| Frank W. Milburn | U.S. Army general during Korean War | Resident | Military |
| Joshua Fields Millburn | Writer, author, co-founder of The Minimalists | Resident | Business |
| Tommy Moe | Olympic gold medalist in skiing | Born | Athletics |
| Slim Moon | Founder of record label Kill Rock Stars | Born and raised | Entertainment |
| Wayne Nance | Serial killer | Resident | |
| Roger Nichols | Songwriter | Born | Entertainment |
| Ted Nichols | Composer, music director at Hanna-Barbera | Born | |
| Ryan Nicodemus | Writer, author, mentor, co-founder of The Minimalists | Resident | Business |
| Carroll O'Connor | Actor | Resident | Entertainment |
| Michael Punke | Writer | Resident | Literature |
| Jeannette Rankin | First woman elected to Congress | Born and raised | Politics |
| Fritzi Ridgeway | Silent film actress | Born | Entertainment |
| Steve Running | 2007 Nobel Peace Prize recipient | Resident | Science |
| Diane Sands | First openly gay member of the Montana Legislature | Resident | Politics |
| Lloyd Schermer | Businessman and artist | Resident | Art |
| Heather Sharfeddin | Novelist | Resident | Literature |
| Richard G. Shoup | U.S. representative | Resident | Politics |
| Jenny Siler | Author | Raised | Literature |
| J.K. Simmons | Actor, voice actor | Resident | Performing arts: movies, television, theater |
| Michael Smuin | Ballet dancer, director, and choreographer | Born and raised | Performing arts |
| Clarence Streit | Writer | Resident | Activism |
| Kenneth Dupee Swan | Photographer and forester | Resident | Art |
| Taylor Tankersley | Pitcher for the Florida Marlins | Born | Athletics |
| K. Ross Toole | Historian | Born and raised | Academics |
| Harold C. Urey | Nobel Prize–winning scientist | Resident | Science |
| Mandela van Eeden | Radio personality | Resident | Performing arts |
| Allen Vizzutti | Musician (trumpet), professor | Born and raised | Performing arts |
| Josh Wagner | Novelist, comic book writer, and filmmaker | Resident | Literature |
| Dennis Washington | Industrialist | Resident | Business |
| James Welch | Native American author and poet | Resident | Literature, poetry |
| Paul Wheaton | Permaculture author; software engineer | Resident | Literature |
| Bryan Thao Worra | Poet, writer, and journalist | Resident | Literature |
| Hubert Zemke | Pilot and leader of Zemke's Wolf Pack in WWII | Born and raised | Military |
