= Pocket God (comics) =

Digital and paperback comic books–strips by Ape Entertainment

Pocket God the Comics
- Issue #8 (08/3/11) of Pocket God.

Publication information
- Publisher: Ape Entertainment
- Schedule: Irregular schedules
- Format: Ongoing series
- Genre: Adventure
- Publication date: August 3, 2010 – c. Oct 2013
- No. of issues: 25 (excluding #26)

Creative team
- Created by: Allan Dye; Dave Castelnuovo
- Written by: Jason M. Burns
- Artist(s): Rolando Mallada (#1-4, #6-25); Fernando Peniche (#5); Antonio Campo (#5, #9)
- Penciller: Rolando Mallada (#1-4, 6-25)
- Inker: Paul Little
- Letterer: Nick Deschenes
- Colorist(s): Paul Little (#1-4); J.M Ringuet (#5)
- Editor(s): Jason M. Burns; Matt Anderson

Pocket God is a series of digital and print comics, published and marketed by Ape Entertainment and iVerse Media, released for iOS devices, and available in print beginning on August 3, 2010.

Based on the best-selling iOS application Pocket God, created by Bolt Creative's Allan Dye and Dave Castelnuovo, the comic was created and plotted by Dave Castelnuovo and Allan Dye, written by Jason M. Burns, and drawn by Rolando Mallada. The comic is about "an indestructible race of people who inhabit a mysterious island and are continuously (and comically) tortured by their mischievous gods".

25 issues of Pocket God were published, including a special Christmas issue, Xmas Marks the Spot, and fourteen 'behind-the-scenes' comics, named The Pygmy Peril. Pocket God was rated for "mature readers" and "teen and up", due to violence.

According to iVerse Media, Pocket God was the first original iOS game to have its own comics series.

== Publication history ==
A sneak preview of the comic was released on the official website on May 7, 2010, an almost full three months before it was released, describing the series and who was involved. Bolt Creative originally stated it was going to only publish four issues of Pocket God.

Within a week of the comic's release, it was met with generally positive reviews from many websites and critics. The comic quickly reached the top 25 in the App Store, peaking at #1 in the books category. Review websites such as App Advice praise the comic for its engagement, interface, and overall capability, but criticized it for its short storyline, quoting "Minus the title page, instructions, and credits this is a 20-page comic... it goes by so quickly, and there's nothing left to do with it." App Advice gave the comic four and a half stars. 148Apps gave the comic 4 out of 5 stars. Pocket God #1 sold 150,000 copies of the digital comic (while selling fewer than 1,000 print copies).

After the comic's initial success, and due to popular demand, Bolt Creative decided to produce more issues.

Due to financial troubles at Ape Entertainment, the comic was put on hiatus and canceled in late 2013, before releasing its 26th issue. The creators wanted to be able to continue the comics, but the contract was up in the air so it was unknown whether or not the Pocket God comic would continue.

Beginning November 2, 2019, Pocket God was republished on the Webtoon website, being posted gradually in sections by its creators. A final issue, "#26B", was posted on December 31, 2021.

== Setting ==
The comics are set around six pygmies, named Ooga, Klik, Klak, Booga, Dooby, and Nooby, who form a tribe, Oogka Chaka, and are always loyal to their gods (with the exception to Ooga, who thinks worshipping the gods is a waste of time, and does not believe in them). Regardless of Ooga's thoughts, the tribe, Klik mainly, still believe and honour them. The story is set on a small archipelago of islands, approximately 200 Mya (million years ago, set in the Triassic period), when the super continent Pangaea still existed. According to the game, the islands are located in the Panthalassic Ocean, opposite Pangaea. It is set mainly on Oog Island, the home of the tribe. It is a relatively small island, with a small type of forest. When the Gem of Life faded its colour, the Pygmies travel to an unnamed island, with a large rainforest and a hidden temple. Inside the temple is an Egyptian-like setting, with hieroglyphic writing on its walls.

== Plot ==
=== The Gem of Life (August – December 2010) ===
The Gem of Life consists of four parts, in a total of the first four issues, it revolves around the entire tribe as they attempt to return the Gem of Life to its original pedestal, after Nooby clumsily causes their pedestal to be destroyed.

==== Part 1 ====
The comic begins with a meteor hurdling towards Earth, while the tribe is circled around a type of totem pole, holding a gem. The tribe is honouring the gods by offering them large amounts of fish. Much to his boredom, Ooga catches his eye on the meteor that is heading straight for him. He then asks dim-witted Nooby to swap places with him. He agrees, then almost immediately, he is crushed by the meteor, killing him. Klak tries to spear the meteor, resulting the spear to ricochet off it then hit Klak in the chest. The rest, except Ooga, are executed from a chain reaction. The next day, Ooga and Klik have an argument why Ooga keeps disrupting 'the pygmy way'. Klik then explains that their ancestors discovered the Gem of Life, and brought it back to Oog Island and gave them something that they have never could have hoped for, or, in Ooga's terms, asked for. Klik tells him to grow up.

Page 1 of Pocket God, showing Ooga moving out of the way of a meteor, with Nooby willingly switching spots.

Meanwhile, a great white shark with what is described as a military nitrogen laser, approaches the island. Meanwhile, Booga is having trouble trying to light a fire on the meteor that crashed earlier; and volunteers Nooby to gather firewood. As Nooby walks into the small forest, he finds an anthill with an ant on top of it. As Nooby talks to it, Up above in a coconut tree, Ooga spills coconut milk onto Nooby. Back at the meteor, Booga asks where he is. Nooby then runs out of the forest, with hundreds of fire ants crawling on him. He then manages to kill himself, Booga and Nooby. Klak then emerges; and after eating a part of a fish head, he suddenly screams towards the sea and submerges his head underwater. The "Shark with Laser" then lurks towards him. As it prepares to eat him, an octopus grabs Klak and eats him. The next day, the pygmies have a tribe meeting discussing their mortality. He is then interrupted by Nooby, who needs to go to the outhouse. Lightning strikes on the outhouse and he runs out, trying to hold up his grass skirt, while so. he then hides behind the totem pole, with it holding the Gem of Life, and the lightning strikes the pole, snapping it in half. Klik, shocked, exclaims that the gods will 'cast us away once and for all', when the Gem of Life is removed from its pedestal. Klik comes up with a plan to make the gods forgive them, but all but Ooga end up electrocuted. Klik, delusional, but correct, then sees the now discoloured gem and is shocked to say that when the colour drains from the gem, they will lose their immortality.

==== Part 2 ====
Klik and the tribe, much to the dismay of Ooga, journey to the neighbouring island to return the Gem of Life to its original pedestal. The "Shark With Laser" shoots a laser through their raft after they had been in the water for countless hours. They all "abandon ship". They resurface to find that Dooby has been captured by the shark. Ooga rescues him, by throwing a spear into the shark's laser beam, electrocuting itself. When they both resurface, immediately they are pulled by a tsunami, and crash on the island beach. While in the jungle, they arrive to a field of banana skins. A pack of apes terrorise the tribe and Klik is caught by one, and killed. Ooga then realises that, since the gem's power has disappeared, Klik is now deceased forever, by that one part of the gem is now a dark grey. After the tribe craft a tombstone for Klik, Ooga decides that he will return the gem of life for Klik, with the approval of everyone, except Booga, who looks pale and delirious. A bug had sucked blood out of him, from his back. Ooga then rips it off of Booga, throws it on the ground, then jumps onto it, with a "bloody" result. Ooga then thinks he needs some food to regain his health, and immediately, Nooby rolls out a gigantic egg, claiming it is a chicken egg. A Tyrannosaurus rex emerges to attack the group, clearly aggravated.

==== Part 3 ====
As the five remaining pygmies are evading the T. rex, Klak suggests that they run in serpentine. Shortly after, Dooby is caught by his grass skirt by the Rex's mouth. Ooga then throws a spear, narrowly missing Dooby, but hitting the skirt instead, falling to the ground, naked. Dooby falls on Nooby, while trying to catch him. The tribe is disgusted that he is not wearing anything. The dinosaur returns, and the pygmies run into a cave, stopping the dinosaur in its tracks. Klak passes Dooby a bunch of leaves to cover himself up, and then asks how they are going to get rid of the reptile. Ooga asks Booga if he knows how to get rid of it, but he doesn't respond. Ooga approaches Booga and asks if he is alright, and Booga appears to be wrapped under snake skin. Ooga looks at the gem, and another sixth of it is now grey, resulting that Booga is dead. A giant snake had eaten him, and the Pygmies run out of the cave.

Dooby is flabbergasted and in excitement after discovering a whole field of what appears to be mushrooms containing Psilocybin. Dooby is then crushed by the dinosaur's foot, leaving only Ooga, Klak, and Nooby alive. They run towards a cliff, ultimately falling off it. They fall into the water, beside the temple, and Ooga and Klak find that Nooby is being chased by a pack of piranhas. The Laser Shark shoots the piranhas, not knowing it has let the pygmies escape. When on land, they discover the temple, but there is a puzzle to open the entrance. Klak and Ooga are stumped, but to their surprise, Nooby cracks the puzzle in seconds. Inside, Ooga finds a skeleton of a pygmy, still wearing its hat, a bag and a wooden sword. Ooga takes the bag and the sword, while Nooby takes the hat. Ooga then realises that Klak has disappeared, and shouts for him. Klak responds, and they see that Klak is stuck in a large cobweb.

==== Part 4 ====
As Ooga fights to free Klak from the web, a large barking spider emerges behind them. Nooby starts singing "Itsy Bitsy Spider" when it lands in front of them. They throw themselves away from the beast as it jumps towards them. It then cocoons Klak, who is still stuck. Nooby then says that he rips the legs off smaller spiders and "watch legless balls wriggle". Ooga gets the idea and quickly uses his sword to chop off the spider's legs. As Nooby and Ooga try to get Klak out of the cocoon, another fraction of the gem has faded to grey, indicating he has suffocated in the cocoon, but as they rip it open, dozens of baby barking spiders crawl out and chase them. They run off again, both agreeing that they are tired of doing so. As they exit, they push a large circular door to stop the spiders from getting to them. As Ooga explains they are the last hope of getting the gem to the gods, Nooby tells that he did not believe in them though. Ooga says he does now, but he thinks the gods do not believe in them, and how they deserve to know why the gods are always killing them. As he reaches in his bag, Ooga finds a journal, it reads:

I have travelled once again to this island to uncover the true nature of that which the gods have bestowed upon us.
I have witnessed a side of their generosity that seems more sinister than sincere.
Their gift not only promises eternal life, but from what I have seen, eternal death as well.

As Ooga questions what 'eternal death' means, a zombified hand smashes up from the ground. As Nooby says that he doesn't like scary stories, four zombies come up from the ground. They are the zombified remains of Klik, Booga, Dooby, and Klak, all exclaiming "brains!". Nooby is excited that his friends are back, obviously not realizing they are zombies. The zombies attack and kill Nooby. Ooga, upset, says that it was all is fault for everything, and he failed to return the Gem of Life. As he is saying this, he falls through a hidden trap. He falls through into a chamber, inside the volcano, with five differently coloured organisms, revealing it is the gods. As Ooga asks what they are, the purple god obnoxiously says 'What do we look like, numb nards?', the yellow god tells him to calm down, as he has come a long way. Ooga asks what it all means, life, the red god says "that's not exactly our field of enterprise". Ooga then asks "If you don't know the meaning of life, why do you tamper with ours?" They then say it's not tampering, its fun. He is then confused, then asks why the Gem is dying. They say they have to wait for the next update, but then says that he has to return it to its original pedestal. As he walks across the unstable bridge, he asks for all of them back, even Klik. he puts the gem on the pedestal, and walks back, as he is, the laser shark emerges from the water, making Ooga fall towards the magma. When Ooga falls into the magma, the volcano erupts.

Back on the home island, Booga, Klak, Klik, Nooby, and Dooby, pop out of mid-air, alive. Klik states that Ooga has saved them and appeased the gods as well. As a wave crashes on the island, the Gem of Life is found.

=== Xmas Marks the Spot (December 18, 2010) ===
Set after the events of The Gem of Life, released on December 18, 2010, with version 1.4 on iOS. The issue is the Christmas special of the series, introducing two characters to the series, Red, and Newbie.

=== A Tale of Two Pygmies (March – August 2011) ===
The second story arc, A Tale of Two Pygmies was released between 30 March, and 3 August 2011, with the eighth issue being released one year since the initial release of the comics. The three-part comic describes how Ooga and Klik's rivalry exceeds towards "catastrophe", and as a result, Ooga ends up being banished from the tribe. With Booga and Nooby joining him on the opposite side of Oog Island, they initiate a plan to steal the Gem of Life from Klik's possession. Klik, after realising that it has been stolen, immediately blames Ooga and engages in a battle, which leads to Nooby discovering another Pygmy, Sun, a female Pygmy, who was in search of the "Jewel of Life", and explains that she had retrieved the Gem. Attempting to escape, Ooga and Klik, who had called a truce, managed to take back the Gem and capture Sun. The epilogue of the final issue shows Newbie, exclaiming, he had survived death from the fifth issue.

=== A Quest Called Tribe (September – December 2011) ===
==== Part 1 ====
Sun informs the boys that her tribe's Jewel of Life had been stolen by Newbie and that the members had split up, following different techniques in hopes of finding it. Though Ooga is against the idea, feeling that Sun is leading them on, Klik insists that they bring Sun back home, believing that it wound answer and create questions about their existence. As they set out, Sun discloses that as she was following Newbie, she passed a seemingly bare and tiny island that Newbie disappeared onto. As they approach this island, they are attacked by an enormous octopus, whose likeness is represented by a small statue on the island. As it captures them and begins to consume the pygmies, Klik reveals that he brought along the Gem, which outrages Ooga. At the last minute, the Tyrannosaurus rex "Chicken" in his zombie form resurfaces from under the ocean and attacks the octopus, allowing the pygmies an escape.

Ooga reprimands Klik for bringing along the Gem, claiming that it was irresponsible and that he had led them on a pointless mission. As Ooga and Klik continue to argue, Nooby jams the gem into a hole in the statue, uncovering a secret passageway below the ground. Sun speculates that Newbie used the girl's Jewel to unlock the door and escape, and they all descend into the chamber. They find themselves in a cavern full of glowing plants, but at what appears to be a dead end, as the only other exit is through a diving pool. However, Nooby's curiosity proves to be productive again; he takes one of the plants and puts it over his head. Klik examines the plant, discovering that it adheres to the head and exudes oxygen. Taking advantage of this knowledge, they use the plants as makeshift scuba gear and continue their journey into the water. As they pass through large caves with mysterious carvings, they find an opening through which they see a large temple in the distance. Sun is convinced that this is the next step of their journey.

==== Part 2 ====
The tribe and Sun stare at the temple, but find there is no entry to it. The walls have too many holes in different directions, which do not appear to be natural. Sun suggests that they have to search all of them until they can find the right one. Klik points out that the plants they are wearing have a limited amount of oxygen and they only have 20 minutes of it left. Nooby looks in one of the holes and he is grabbed by another tentacle. Soon many tentacles come out and try to grab the group. Klik says that it's the creature that made the holes in the wall. Klak and Dooby are grabbed. They swim to a nearby hole and see one of Sun's missing tribe members, Kinsee, stuck in a trap. Klik finds the way to free Kinsee from the trap, but the creature finds the group. Klik, Ooga, and Sun go and try to free Kinsee, but she points out that it is too late. Ooga lets go of one of the levers in anger and the trap activates into a whirlpool. As they get sucked in, Nooby gets caught by the creature. Ooga tries to save Nooby, but he gets caught by the creature himself. Sun cuts the creature's tongue using a nearby stalagmite, but Ooga still tries to free Nooby. Nooby, happy that Ooga likes him enough to save him, decides to die happy and allows himself to be eaten.

Klik wakes up in a giant bubble. Ooga explains that a group of sentient creatures known as the Bubble Breathing People have helped them. The leader, King Dumas, says that Newbie came in and pillaged their sacred mine for the gems. Klik agrees to try to help reclaim the stones. Nooby is shown to have survived after being dropped out of the creature's "bottom mouth". A stranger in a scuba suit comes and tells Nooby to be quiet. He explains that he is a hunter, who also made that whirlpool trap Kinsee was in, trying to catch the creature for food. Suddenly, someone points a stake at Nooby.

== Main characters ==
The main characters in the comic are pygmies who belong to the tribe Oogka Chaka.

Final concept drawings of (from top left to bottom right) Ooga, Klak, Dooby, Booga, Klik and Nooby.

=== Male Tribe ===
==== Ooga ====
Ooga is the "reluctant" leader of the 'Oogka Chaka' tribe. He is monstrously mischievous towards the others and usually causes their deaths. Ooga does not respect the tribe very much, and does not believe in the gods. Ooga loathes Klik, because of his frequent conversations about the gods. Ooga is unbelievably selfish, but when Klik picks on someone for doing something wrong, Ooga stands up against Klik. Most likely because he dislikes Klik. Ooga only gets along with Nooby, whose intelligence is limited and never takes negative subjects seriously, nor positively. Nooby tell Ooga that the entire tribe says that he's a monster, but that he doesn't listen to them. Although Ooga treats him the same as everyone else, Ooga is called by, Nooby, his 'bestest friend'.

==== Klik ====
Klik is the most intelligent Pygmy of the tribe, he respects everyone, except Ooga, because he does not believe in the gods. Klik usually picks on Ooga and Nooby for the stupid things they have done, like Ooga, for not believing in the gods, and Nooby, for his stupidity.

==== Dooby ====
Dooby is described as a 'Rastafarian hippy' pygmy, he is more relaxed and is always positive that the gods will turn their ways and gift them. Dooby constantly reminds Booga to be patient, and at one time, Booga cracks under Dooby's constant reminders to him and the tribe, and screams 'Bull Shark!', an alternative to the similar swear.

==== Klak ====
Klak is a cheerful, and unlucky pygmy, the most major difference to him in the comics and in the game is that in the comic he is chubby, and constantly searches for food. Klak usually backs up Booga's remarks, usually standing beside him while doing so. Like all of the tribe, except Nooby, he thinks that Ooga is a monster, but he does not dislike him like most of the tribe. Other than Nooby, he is killed more than any other pygmy in the tribe.

==== Nooby ====
Nooby is a, somewhat, lucky pygmy (according to himself), and he has the lowest mental intelligence in the tribe. He speaks almost entirely in illeism. In The Pygmy Peril, it is revealed that he becomes easily confused when in a conversation, and that he is best friends with Ooga. Although the tribe thinks of Ooga as a monster, Nooby says that he does not listen to them. Although he is dim-witted, he can be significantly smart in certain situations, such as when Ooga, and Klak were trying to decode a puzzle, and Nooby easily cracks it within seconds.

==== Booga ====
Booga is a constantly aggravated pygmy who is unshaven, unclean, and has a tattoo on his right arm of a bone. He is not easily distracted, and is immediately negative to most circumstances, such as when Dooby says, 'If it's meant to be, it's meant to be', after the gem is discoloured, Booga then proceeds to yell 'Bull shark!' (to avoid the use of profane language). While Booga agrees that Ooga is a monster, he states in A Tale of Two Pygmies that he would rather be led by Ooga; mainly because he has increased charisma and does not talk as much as Klik.

=== Female Tribe ===
In the eighth comic, the end of the "Tale of Two Pygmies" story arc, the first female pygmy, Sun, was introduced. She hinted towards the rest of her tribe, which is essentially the male tribe's female counterparts, with some changes. The tribe was introduced one at a time at first, but the remaining three were shown all at once. The arrival of female pygmies sparked romance, arguments, and even eventually led to Nooby abandoning the tribe, only to return in the same issue.

==== Sun ====
Sun is the first female to appear in the comics. She is adventurous, seemingly short tempered and very loyal to her friends. At first, her and Ooga seemed to hardly get along, but as the comics progressed, they became closer. Also like Ooga, Sun was at first relatively uncooperative but began taking initiative whenever her tribe was in peril. She first showed skepticism towards the male tribe, particularly Nooby, whom she confused for someone who had wronged he. In time, she began to warm up to her new friends, particularly Ooga, much to other pygmies' (Kinsee and Nooby) anger or disappointment.

==== Teela ====
Teela is a pygmy from the female tribe who plays a similar role to Klik's. She was simultaneously introduced to the series along with Linsee and Toola. Teela is shown to be quite smart like Klik, but unlike him, she does not believe in the Gods and usually talks about scientific subjects rather than divinity. Despite her capabilities, she is picked on by the other members of her tribe, as opposed to Klik, who is respected among his peers. As time progresses, however, she gains more recognition from her fellow tribe members and the male tribe.

==== Toola ====
Toola is a female pygmy and a member of Sun's tribe. Unlike Sun, Moon, or Kinsee, Toola was not introduced to the series individually, instead first appearing along Teela and Linsee. Toola seems to be quite superficial to some extent, as she occasionally gets concerned about her appearance, evidenced when Toola kept worrying about her hair while trekking. She is also quite fond of her beauty, even describing it as a weapon at one point. Despite this, Toola is shown to be very mother-like, and is willing to help her peers when the time is needed; it is mentioned she is considerably skilled in medicine. Similar to Dooby, she is very hippie-like in demeanor. Toola also seems to speak in a different manner, as she replaces the ending of words that end with "-er" to "-ah" (i.e. the word "never" is changed to "nevah") and often includes the word "like" in the middle of her sentences.

==== Moon ====
Moon is the third female pygmy to appear in the comic series and is a member of Sun's tribe. A "goth" pygmy, she is a bit of a troublemaker, and can also be very bossy. She can also be very rough in demeanor (she states that she "hates mushy feelings"), as well as very bold. Because of her rough nature, she is not that much of a sensible person; this is shown when she tried to cheer up a downtrodden Klak by threatening to hurt him if he did not feel happier. As Klak and Moon spent time together, they became close friends; Klak even gained a bit more confidence thanks to Moon's help, as he seemed to be more secure and commanding during the progression of the comics.

==== Linsee ====
Linsee is a member of Sun's tribe. She was introduced along with Teela and Toola simultaneously. Linsee has a penchant for drinking, particularly fermented coconut milk. This results in her inebriation, with Linsee becoming relatively careless or somewhat hostile when so; she also hiccups a lot as a result. Other pygmies, particularly Teela, worried about her well being, despite Linsee never really caring for such.

==== Kinsee ====
Kinsee is the second female pygmy to be showcased in the comics. Like Moon, she has black, short hair with a stripe on it; the only difference is that her hair is cut in a bob style and the stripe is purple and located on her ponytail. This ponytail was longer in her first appearances but is later cut by Sun in an attempt to save her from a monster. Kinsee has misandrist tendencies, quickly becoming hostile towards the male tribe upon their arrival. She holds a particular grudge against Ooga and Booga, as the former allegedly stole her best friend (Sun) and the latter, due to his brutish demeanor, is seen as "annoying". Kinsee eventually warms up to the majority of the male tribe, though Booga seems to still be at odds with her.
