= Rob Worley =

American writer and editor

- Area: Writer
- Notable works: Scratch9, Advent Rising: Rock the Planet

Rob Worley is an American writer and editor. He is the creator of the comic Scratch9, which was nominated for an Eisner Award in 2011.

== Biography ==
Worley founded Comics2Film in 1997, the first website dedicated to tracking news about comic book movies.

Worley was picked up as one of the first writers for Marvel Comics' Epic imprint when it launched in 2003. His project, Young Ancient One (a Doctor Strange prequel) was published as one third of the single-issue Epic Anthology Presents in February 2004.

Worley continued to work with former Marvel President and 360ep founding partner Bill Jemas. In 2005, they collaborated on Advent Rising: Rock the Planet alongside Arthur Dela Cruz, Cliff Richards, Dennis Crisotomo, Cris Delara and Simon Bowland, supervised by Advent creator Donald Mustard. The comic was published as a five-issue series which ran from October 2005 to November 2006.

From 2005 to early 2006 he contributed short comics stories to various anthologies published by Italy's Narwain publishing. From October 2005 to April 2006 Worley served as an English language translator on several titles, including Free Fall, Tales from a Forgotten Planet and Bluff.

After writing two novels for their young readers imprint, Actionopolis, Worley joined Komikwerks as the Director of Web Development in January 2006. He was instrumental in helping them ramp up the web presence for the new book line as well as enhancing the existing web comics site. In September 2006 the first of those novels, Heir to Fire was published, his first published novel.

Worley sold Comics2Film to Demand Media in February 2008. In September of that year the site's content was absorbed into Mania.com where Worley continued on as a contributor.

October 22, 2008 saw the publication of his new graphic novel The Revenant.

Worley's creator-owned, all-ages comic book Scratch9 was published as a four-issue mini-series from September 2010 to January 2011 by Ape Entertainment. Jason T. Kruse was the primary artist with Mike Kunkel providing the cover art for the first two issues. The book was nominated for several awards including a 2011 Eisner Award in the Best Publication for Kids category.

The comic returned in 2013 with new publisher Hermes Press

== Bibliography ==
=== Writing ===
- Epic Anthology Presents #1 - Feb 2004 - Story: "Young Ancient One" (Marvel Comics)
- Advent Rising: Rock the Planet #1-5 - Oct 2005 - Nov 2006 (360ep)
- Bryan Yuzna's Horrorama #1 - Dec 2005 - Story: "Regret" (Narwain)
- New Orleans & Jazz - Mar 2006 - Story: "Louis and the Rain Clouds" (Narwain)
- Bryan Yuzna's Horrorama #3 - Mar 2006 - Story: "Security" (Narwain)
- Tales from a Forgotten Planet #2 - June 2006 - Story: "Crunch Time" (Narwain)
- Heir to Fire: Gila Flats - Oct 2006 - (Komikwerks/Actionopolis)
- Medusa - Jan 2008 (Abdo Publishing)
- Puss in Boots - Jan 2008 (Abdo Publishing)
- The Wonderful Wizard of Oz - Jan 2008 (Abdo Publishing)
- The Revenant - Oct 2008 (Desperado Publishing)
- The Boy Who Cried Wolf - Jan 2010 (Abdo Publishing)
- The Ants and the Grasshopper - Jan 2010 (Abdo Publishing)
- Heir to Fire: Zephyr Mesa - July 2010 - (Komikwerks/Actionopolis)
- The Legend of Tigerfist - July 2010 - (Komikwerks/Actionopolis)
- Loki - Sep 2010 (Abdo Publishing)
- Heimdall - Sep 2010 (Abdo Publishing)
- Scratch9 #1 - Sep 2010 (Ape Entertainment)
- Scratch9 #2 - Oct 2010 (Ape Entertainment)
- Scratch9 #3 - Dec 2010 (Ape Entertainment)
- Scratch9 #4 - Jan 2011 (Ape Entertainment)
- Scratch9 TPB - June 2011 (Ape Entertainment)
- Richie Rich: Rich Rescue #3 - 2011 (Ape Entertainment)
- Redakai: Conquer the Kairu #1 - 2012 (Spin Master)
- Redakai: Conquer the Kairu #2 - 2012 (Spin Master)
- Redakai: Conquer the Kairu #3 - 2012 (Spin Master)
- Scratch9 #1 (Free Comic Book Day Edition) - May 4, 2013 (Hermes Press)
- Scratch9: Cat Tails #1 - July 2013 (Hermes Press)
- Scratch9: Cat Tails #2 - September 2013 (Hermes Press)
- Scratch9: Free Comic Book Day 2014 Special - May 3, 2014 (Hermes Press)
- Scratch9: Cat of Nine Worlds #1 - June 4, 2014 (Hermes Press)
- Airwolf: Airstrikes TPB - May, 2015 - Story: "Airwolf vs Airshark" (IDW Publishing)
- Scratch9: Cat of Nine Worlds TPB - July, 2015 (Hermes Press)
- Scratch9: The Pet Project & Cat Tails TPB - October, 2015 (Robot Monkey Worx)

=== Editing ===
- Bryan Yuzna's Horrorama #1 - Dec 2005 (Narwain)
- Free Fall #1 - Dec 2005 (Narwain)
- Jenna #1 - 2 - Dec 2005-Jan 2006 (Narwain)
- Rash #1-2 - Dec 2005 - Jan 2006 (Narwain)
- Wall after Wall #1 - Dec 2005 (Narwain)
- The Great Seal #1 - Jan 2006 (Narwain)
- Bryan Yuzna's Horrorama #3 - Mar 2006 - (Narwain)
- Zombie-Sama! - Apr 2006 - (Narwain, later republished without proper credit)
- Tales from a Forgotten Planet #2 - June 2006 (Narwain)
