= Geoffrey Thorne =

American writer

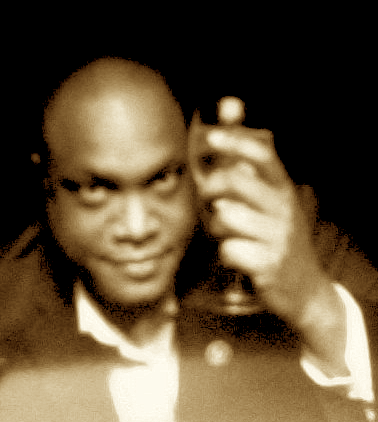
- Born: January 20, 1970 (age 56); Washington, D.C., U.S.
- Occupations: Writer; producer; actor
- Website: geoffreythorne.com

Geoffrey Thorne (born January 20, 1970) is an American screenwriter, television producer, novelist and actor.

== Biography ==
Thorne was born in Washington, D.C. After a successful career as a television actor including portraying police officer Wilson Sweet in the television series In the Heat of the Night from 1988 to 1993, Thorne began writing professionally, winning Second Prize in Simon & Schuster's sixth annual Strange New Worlds anthology with his story "The Soft Room." He went on to publish more stories in several media tie-in anthologies as well as the Star Trek: Titan novel Sword of Damocles.

Other stories he has written include contributions to Flying Pen Press's anthology Space Grunts, MV Media's Steamfunk anthology, and Ellery Queen's Mystery Magazine.

As a screenwriter, Thorne was a writer for Law & Order: Criminal Intent, Ben 10, Ultimate Spider-Man, Leverage, and The Librarians, among others.

In 2014 Lion Forge Entertainment and NBC-Universal tapped Thorne to reboot Knight Rider in comic book form. Thorne is also the co-creator of Phantom Canyon, an audio drama from Pendant Productions.

In 2017 Marvel Entertainment tapped Thorne to be head writer and showrunner of the fifth season of Avengers Assemble, Black Panther's Quest. In 2019, he became co-executive producer of Ghost, a spinoff of the STARZ series Power.

Thorne is also a co-founder and writing partner of GENRE 19, a studio he formed with artist Todd Harris in 2008.

== The Winterman Project ==
The Winterman Project is a small press established by Thorne in which he produces shorts, comics and ebooks. Thorne describes it as "a place to play, a place where I could write what I want, make what I want without worrying about clients or editorial oversight." In the end of 2017, he launched "Winterman Comics", a line of comics including an anthology series and a series of titles.

== Works ==
=== Star Trek ===
- Strange New Worlds VI (June 2003)
  - "The Soft Room"
- Star Trek: Deep Space Nine: Prophecy and Change (September 2003)
  - "Chiaroscuro"
- Strange New Worlds 8 (July 2005)
  - "Concurrence"
- Star Trek: Voyager: Distant Shores (November 2005)
  - "Or the Tiger"

=== Novels ===
- Star Trek: Titan: Sword of Damocles (November 2007)
- Winter of the Wild Hunt (October 2010)
- Better Angels (February 2012)
- Galatea's Cross (December 2012)

=== Comics ===
- Honor Brigade (Spinner Rack Comics, 2009)
- Prodigal: Egg of First Light (Ape Entertainment, 2010)
- Dark Horse Presents: Journeymen (Dark Horse Comics, 2013)
- Prodigal: Remastered (Trillbent.com, 2013)
- Knight Rider (Lion Forge Comics, 2013)
- Mosaic (Marvel Comics, 2016-2017)
- Solo (Marvel Comics, 2016)
- Winterman Comics (The Winterman Project, 2017)
- Black Panther: Soul of a Machine (Marvel Comics, 2017)
- Menthu: Scarab vs Bull (Black Inc!, 2017)
- Spider-Geddon: George Stacy, the Spider (Marvel Comics, 2018)
- Battlebook: Redjack (Winterman Comics, 2018)
- Battlebook: Pilgrim (Winterman Comics, 2018)
- Battlebook: The Return of Cadre One (Winterman Comics, 2018)
- Marvel's Voices (Marvel Comics, 2020)
- Future State: Green Lantern #1-2 (DC Comics, 2021)
- Menagerie: Declassified (Myth Division, 2021)
- King in Black: Black Panther (Marvel Comics, 2021)
- Truth & Justice: Vixen (DC Comics, 2021)
- Planet of the Symbiotes #2 (Marvel Comics, 2021)
- Infinite Frontier #0 (DC Comics, 2021)
- Green Lantern vol. 6 #1-12 (DC Comics, 2021-2022)
- Blood Syndicate: Season One #1-6 (Milestone Media, 2022)
- John Stewart: Emerald Knight (DC Comics, 2023)
- Milestone 30th Anniversary (Milestone Media, 2023)
- X-Force #1-10 (Marvel Comics, 2024-2025)
- Hellfire Vigil #1 (Marvel Comics, 2025)

=== Anthologies ===
- Writers of the Future XXII (finalist, Galaxy Press)
  - Red/Shift
- The Adventures of Vale & Mist Phobos Books)
  - Free Men on a Dyson Sphere
  - Baal Breakers
- Triangulation: End of Time (Parsec Ink)
  - Eshu & The Anthropic Principle
- Astonishing Adventures Magazine #1 (AAM Publishing, 2008)
  - The 3rd Option
- Barren Worlds (Hadley Rille Books, 2008)
  - Antiope in Black
- Astonishing Adventures Magazine #3 (AAM Publishing, 2008)
  - The Dame Wore a Tesseract
- POW!erful Tales (Peryton Publishing, 2009)
  - The Lingering Grief of Twilight
- Full Throttle Space Tales: Space Grunts (Flying Pen Press, 2009)
  - Truth Metric
- Words to Music (Michael Wells, 2011)
  - Thanks to Captain Go
- Griots: A Sword & Soul Anthology (MVmedia, LLC, 2011)
  - Sekadi's Koan
- Ellery Queen's Mystery Magazine (Dell Publishing, 2013)
  - The Playlist
- Steamfunk (MVMedia LLC, 2013)
  - The Tunnel @ the End of the Light
- Pangaea (Crazy 8 Press, 2015)
  - Polo's Finger
- Pangaea II (Crazy 8 Press, 2016)
  - Polo's Way
- Pangaea III (Crazy 8 Press, 2020)
  - Polo's Shadow
- Phenomenons I (Crazy 8 Press, 2021)
  - The Last Rambler
- Phenomenons II (Crazy 8 Press, 2022)
  - Dirty Work
- Thrilling Adventure Yarns 2022 (Crazy 8 Press, 2023)
  - Riding in Cars with Girls

=== Collections ===
- Geoffrey Thorne's Dreamnasium The Winterman Project, 2010)
- The Grim Arcana The Winterman Project, 2010)
  - The Price of Salt
  - The Cost of Opening
  - Fixing Mr. Styx
- Fringe Space The Winterman Project, 2013)
  - Truth Metric
  - Thanks to Captain Go
  - Fina Silento
- Dreamnasium Redux (the Winterman project, 2020)
- Dreamnasium Locus (Crazy 8 Press, 2023)
- Into the Mystic (Crazy 8 Press, 2024)

=== Audio dramas ===
- Phantom Canyon (Pendant Productions, 2014)
- Dreamnasium Podcast (Winterman Project & Pendant Productions)
- Black Panther: Sins of the Father (Serial Box, 2021)

=== Writing filmography ===
- The Rivals (screen story for Star Trek: The Next Generation)
- Geoffrey Thorne's The Dark (web series)
- Law & Order: Criminal Intent (television series, Wolf Films)
- Leverage (television series, Electric Entertainment)
- Ben 10: Ultimate Alien (television series, Cartoon Network)
- Ben 10: Omniverse (television series, Cartoon Network)
- The Librarians (television series, Electric Entertainment)
- Ultimate Spider-Man (television series, Disney XD)
- Niko and the Sword of Light (television series, Amazon)
- Avengers Assemble (television series, Disney XD)
- Power Book II: Ghost (STARZ)
- Magnum P.I. (CBS)
- Redjack: The Animated Shorts (web series)
- Eyes of Wakanda (Disney+)
- Batman: Caped Crusader (Amazon)
