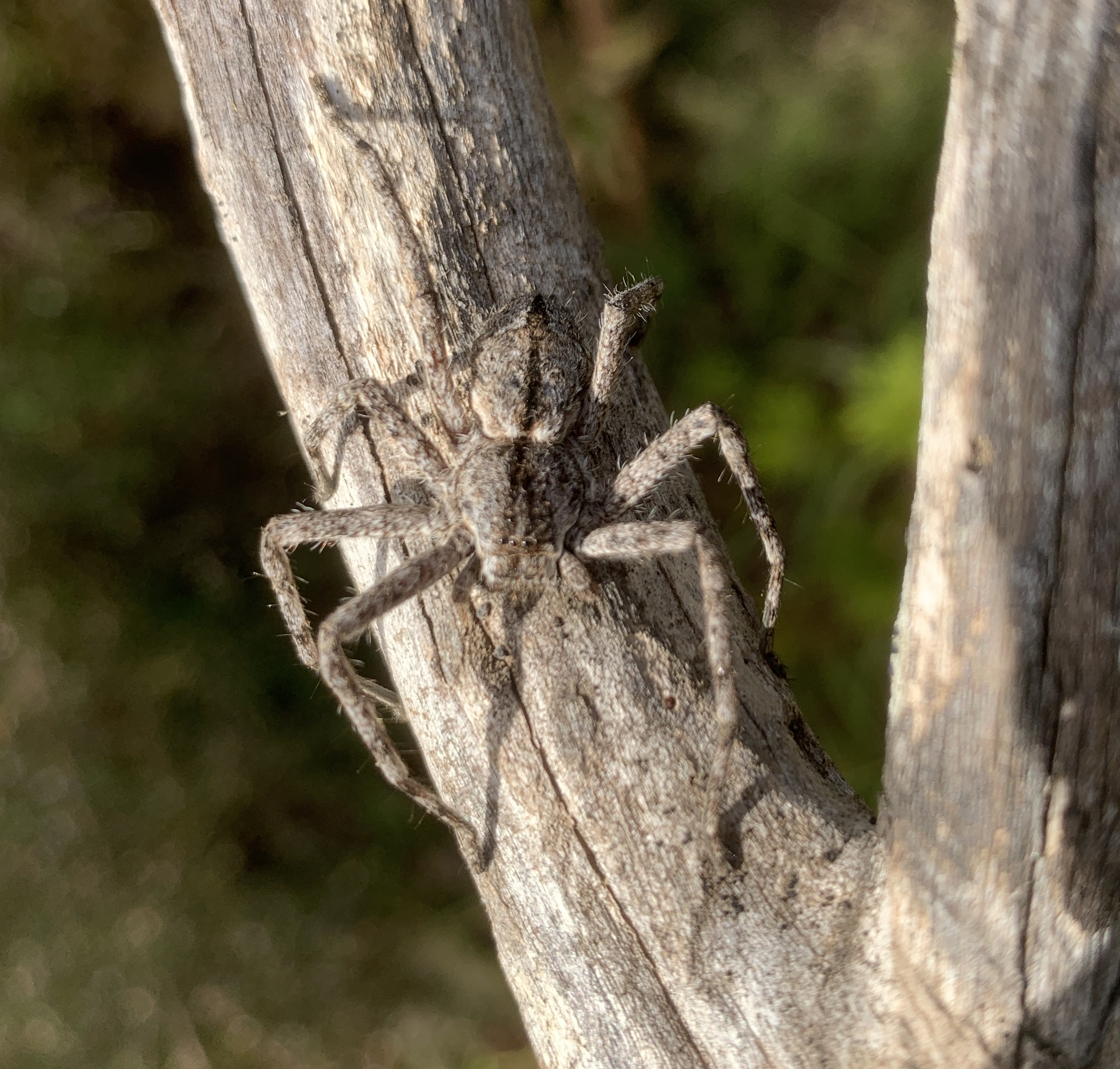
- Pediana regina

Scientific classification
- Kingdom: Animalia
- Phylum: Arthropoda
- Subphylum: Chelicerata
- Class: Arachnida
- Order: Araneae
- Infraorder: Araneomorphae
- Family: Sparassidae
- Genus: Pediana; Simon, 1880

Type species
- P. regina (L. Koch, 1875)

Species
- 9, see text

= Pediana =

Genus of spiders

Pediana is a genus of huntsman spiders that was first described by Eugène Louis Simon in 1880.

== Species ==
As of September 2022 it contains nine species, endemic entirely to Australia.

- Pediana horni (Hogg, 1896) – Australia
- Pediana longbottomi Hirst, 1996 – Australia (Western Australia)
- Pediana mainae Hirst, 1995 – Australia (Northern Territory)
- Pediana occidentalis Hogg, 1903 – Australia (Western Australia, South Australia)
- Pediana paradoxa Hirst, 1996 – Australia (South Australia)
- Pediana regina (L. Koch, 1875) (type) – Australia (Western Australia, Queensland, New South Wales)
- Pediana temmei Hirst, 1996 – Australia (South Australia)
- Pediana tenuis Hogg, 1903 – Australia (Western Australia, South Australia)
- Pediana webberae Hirst, 1996 – Australia (Northern Territory)
