= Ape Entertainment =

American comic book publisher

- Status: Defunct, c. 2015
- Founded: 2003; 23 years ago
- Founders: Brent E. Erwin; David Hedgecock
- Country of origin: U.S.
- Headquarters location: Chula Vista, California
- Key people: C. Michael Hall
- Publication types: Comics, Trade paperbacks, Graphic novels, Webcomics
- Fiction genres: Children's, Humor, Horror
- Imprints: KiZoic; Outlaw Comics
- Official website: apeentertainment.com apecomics.com

Ape Entertainment, also known as Ape Comics, was an American independent comic book publisher that operated from 2003 to c. 2015.

The company began by publishing original limited series and graphic novels, many with mature themes; it later pivoted and became known for its family-friendly titles as well as cross-media properties such as comics based on video games. Ape Entertainment formed licensing deals with DreamWorks Animation, American Greetings, Harvey Comics, and Sesame Workshop; producing comics featuring Kung Fu Panda, Madagascar, Megamind, Shrek, Strawberry Shortcake, Richie Rich, Casper the Friendly Ghost, and Sesame Street.

== Creators ==
Notable creators associated with Ape Entertainment included Neil Druckmann, Francesco Francavilla, Chandra Free, Jonathon Dalton, Joe Staton, Geoffrey Thorne, Josh Wagner, and Rob Worley.

== History ==
=== Origins ===
Ape Entertainment was founded in 2003 by Brent E. Erwin, with a background in film production, and David Hedgecock, with experience in comic book retail and editing. Bringing on managing editor C. Michael "Mike" Hall, Erwin took on the role of marketing director and Hedgecock that of finance director.

The company's first print offerings were in 2004, including such titles as the Ape OMNIBUS Vols. 1 and 2, the 2-issue series A Different Pace, the Atomic Age Treasury of Pulp Action by David Wharton, and Make Your Own Comics: The Small Press Primer by Mike Hall. During this time, Ape Entertainment also published a selection of original webcomics, many of which were produced by managing editor Mike Hall.

=== Digital and licensed properties ===
In 2010, Ape Entertainment changed direction. It began publishing comics based on video games, starting with Pocket God and then Cut the Rope in July 2011. The company made news in late 2011 when it was revealed that it had sold 150,000 units of the Pocket God #1 digital comic (while selling fewer than 1,000 print copies). The success of Pocket God demonstrated the potential of adapting content from emerging digital platforms into traditional comic book formats.

By 2010, Ape Entertainment had made licensing deals with DreamWorks Animation. The company debuted its family-friendly Kizoic imprint with the Free Comic Book Day (FCBD) flip book comic, Kizoic Presents: Penguins of Madagascar FCBD 2010 / Kizoic Presents: Shrek FCBD 2010.

In 2011, Ape Entertainment acquired the rights to the legacy Harvey Comics characters Richie Rich and Casper the Friendly Ghost. Ape Entertainment updated the Richie Rich character by emphasizing his altruistic side; "a mix of James Bond and Indiana Jones with the world's biggest bank account, Richie is an altruistic adventurer who travels the world helping the less fortunate!" The new Richie was joined by updated versions of his robot maid Irona and his butler Cadbury.

In 2012, the company produced a comic book based on Madagascar 3: Europe's Most Wanted. The comic, Madagascar Digest Prequel: Long Live the King!, was released on June 12, 2012.

In early 2013, the company partnered with the (essentially defunct) publisher Sirius Entertainment to bring back the late Drew Hayes' comic Poison Elves, published under a new Ape Entertainment mature readers imprint: Outlaw Comics. A continuation of the original series, Drew Hayes Poison Elves #1 was based on Hayes' outline for future issues. Three issues ended up being published.

In the spring of 2013, Ape Entertainment announced a partnership with Sesame Workshop, as well as plans to release a number of Sesame Street-themed comics.

=== Decline and disappearance ===
By mid-2013, the company's fortunes appeared to take a downturn. That summer, Ape Entertainment editor-in-chief Brent E. Erwin, who had a background in retailing, acquired two locations of Buddy Saunders' Lone Star Comics chain. In August of that year, Ape Entertainment CEO David Hedgecock left the company to join IDW Publishing. At that point, the two remaining founders, Erwin and Hall, canceled Ape Entertainment's upcoming titles and reorganized the company.

The company managed to release two Sesame Street comics in 2015, but has not published anything since then.

== Titles ==
=== Ongoing titles ===
- Ape OMNIBUS Vols. 1 and 2 (May 2004–Dec 2004) — anthology
- Athena Voltaire: Flight of the Falcon by Paul Daly and Steve Bryant (4 issues, 2006–2007)
- Bizarre New World (3 issues, 2007)
- The Black Coat: A Call to Arms by Adam Cogan, Ben Lichius, and Francesco Francavilla (4 issues, 2006)
- The Black Coat: Or Give Me Death by Adam Cogan, Ben Lichius, and Francesco Francavilla (4 issues, 2007)
- A Different Pace by writer David Hedgecock and artists Tetsu Liew, Vincent Ramirez, and Terry Flippo (2 issues, 2004)
- Femme Noir: The Dark City Diaries by Christopher Milles, Joe Staton, and Horacio Ottolini (4 issues, 2008) — later collected into a TPB
- Fiction Clemens by Josh Wagner (3 issues, 2008)
- The Goblin Chronicles by Troy Dye, Tom Kelesides, and Collin Foge (3 issues, 2008)
- Helldorado: East Eats West by C. Michael Hall (3 issues, 2011–2012)
- Horrorwood by Brandon Terrell and Brent Schoonover (4 issues, 2006)
- Magnitude by Greg Waller and Axel Giménez (3 issues, 2006–2007)
- RPM: Rapid Performance Machines, by Matt Shepherd and Andres Guinaldo, Diego Rodriguez (4 issues, 2010–2011)
- The Misadventures of Clark & Jefferson by Jay Carvajal and Borstel (4 issues, 2007–2008)
- Scratch9 by Rob Worley and Jason T. Kruse (4 issues, Sep 2010–Jan 2011)
- Sullengrey by Drew Rausch and Jocelyn Gajeway (4 issues, 2005–2006)
- Super Human Resources by Ken Marcus and Justin Bleep (4 issues, 2009)
- Teddy Scares by writer Jim Hankins and artists Christine Larsen, Rolando Mallada, Drew Rausch, Rob Guillory, Chris Moreno, and Dave Perillo (4 issues, 2007)
- U.T.F. (Undead Task Force) by Scott Reynolds and Tone Rodriguez (3 issues, 2006)

=== Graphic novels and one-shots ===
- Athena Voltaire: The Collected Webcomics (TPB, 2006, ISBN 0-9741-3989-0) — collection of comics serialized online between 2002 and 2004; foreword by Mark Schultz
- Atomic Age Treasury of Pulp Action by David Wharton (Jan 2004)
- Cereal & Pajamas (2007) — anthology
- Fablewood (2008) — anthology
- Go-Go Gorilla & The Jungle Crew Summer Fun Special by David Hedgecock, Mike Hall, and Dustin Evans (2005)
- Justice City Chronicles vol. 1 by Marcus DiGesu, Anthony Figaro, and Joel Rasmussen (2005)
- The Trouble with Katie Rogers by Des Taylor (Sep 2009)
- Make Your Own Comics: The Small Press Primer by Mike Hall (Jan 2004)
- Nightmare World: The Long Hard Road Out of Hell by writer Dirk Manning and artist Jeff Welborn, Len O'Grady, Jason Jam, and Josh Ross (2007) — solicited as a 4-issue series; only one issue published
- Pan-Gea (2005)
- Point Pleasant (2004) by writer Chad Lambert
- Prodigal: Egg of First Light by Geoffrey Thorne and Todd Harris (GN, 2010)
- A Second Chance at Sarah by Neil Druckmann and Joysuke Wong (2010); later republished by Dark Horse Comics
- SubCulture by Kevin Freeman and Stan Yan (2007)
- Walled In by Roger Mincheff and Dennis Calero (Apr 2009) — graphic novel accompaniment to the horror-thriller film of the same name; produced by Spacedog
- White Picket Fences by Matt Anderson, Eric Hutchins, Micah Farritor, Brian Mead, and Tim Lattie (2008)

=== Free Comic Book Day issues ===
- 2007 Ape Entertainment's Comic Spectacular — sample stories of six features: Athena Voltaire, White Picket Fences, The Goblin Chronicles, Teddy Scares, Go-go Gorilla and the Jungle Crew, and Bizarre New World
- 2008 Cartoonapalooza #1
- 2009 Cartoonapalooza #2 -- sample stories including R.P.M. by Matt Shepherd and R.A. Height.
- 2010 Kizoic Presents: Penguins of Madagascar / Shrek

=== Video game comics ===
- Command & Conquer Motion Comic (4 episodes)
- Cut the Rope (6 issues, 2011–2012)
- Pocket God by Dave Castelnuovo, Allan Dye, Jason M. Burns, and Rolando Mallada (25 issues, 2010–c. 2013)

=== Licensed properties ===
- Casper's Scare School (2 issues, Oct 2011–June 2012)
- DreamWorks' Megamind: Bad. Blue. Brilliant (5 issues, 2010–2011)
- Kizoic Presents: Dreamworks Kung Fu Panda / Kizoic Presents: Richie Rich in Eruption Disruption! (2011)
- Kizoic Presents: Sesame Street / Kizoic Presents: Strawberry Shortcake (2013)
- Kung Fu Panda (6 issues, 2011–2012)
- The Penguins of Madagascar (4 issues, 2010–2011)
- Penguins of Madagascar Operation: Wonder from Down Under (2010)
- Richie Rich Gems (5 issues, 2011–2013)
- Richie Rich Gems Valentines Special (2012)
- Richie Rich Gems Winter Special (2011)
- Richie Rich: Rich Rescue (6 issues, May 2011 – 2012)
- Richie Rich: Rich Rescue Digest (2 issues, 2012)
- Richie Rich: Welcome to Rich Rescue (2012)
- Sesame Street (2013)
- Sesame Street: Another Sunny Day (2015)
- Sesame Street: Blast from the Past (2015)
- Sesame Workshop: Sesame Street (2013)
- Shrek (TPB, 2010) — sequel to Shrek Forever After
- Shrek (4 issues, 2010–2011)
- Strawberry Shortcake (4 issues, 2011–2012)
- Strawberry Shortcake vol. 2 (2 issues, 2012)
- Strawberry Shortcake Digest (3 issues, 2011)
- Strawberry Shortcake Halloween Mini-Comic / Casper's Scare School Halloween Mini-Comic (2011)
- Strawberry Shortcake Halloween Mini-Comic / Scouts! Halloween Mini-Comic (2012)
- Strawberry Shortcake: Berry Fun! (2012)

== Awards and nominations ==
- 2009 Project Fanboy Awards for "Best Storyline" for Fiction Clemens
- 2011 (nomination) Eisner Award for "Best Publication for Kids" for Scratch9
