= The Goblin Chronicles =

Comic book limited series

Publication information
- Publisher: Ape Entertainment
- Format: Miniseries
- Publication date: March 19, 2008 - present
- No. of issues: 3

Creative team
- Written by: Troy Dye & Tom Kelesides
- Penciller: Collin Fogel
- Colorist: Will Terrell

The Goblin Chronicles is a three-issue comic book mini-series created and written by Troy Dye and Tom Kelesides, penciled by Collin Fogel, colored by Will Terrell and lettered by David Hedgecock.

The Goblin Chronicles is a high fantasy adventure story written for an “all ages” audience. Published by Ape Entertainment, the first issue debuted in comic shops across North America on March 19, 2008.

The Goblin Chronicles is Ape Entertainment's first all-ages comic book published in the fantasy genre. Advance reviews were largely positive.

The Goblin Gadgeteer, a prequel story set in the world of The Goblin Chronicles, appeared in Ape Entertainment's 2007 Free Comic Book Day offering titled Ape's Entertainment's Comic Spectacular. The prequel story focused on one of the four main characters from the miniseries: Gorim the goblin.

Another prequel story, A Tale of Two Shifters, appeared in the Fablewood Anthology, published by Ape Entertainment in February 2008. The story also featured one of the four main characters from the miniseries: Sprig the shape shifter.
