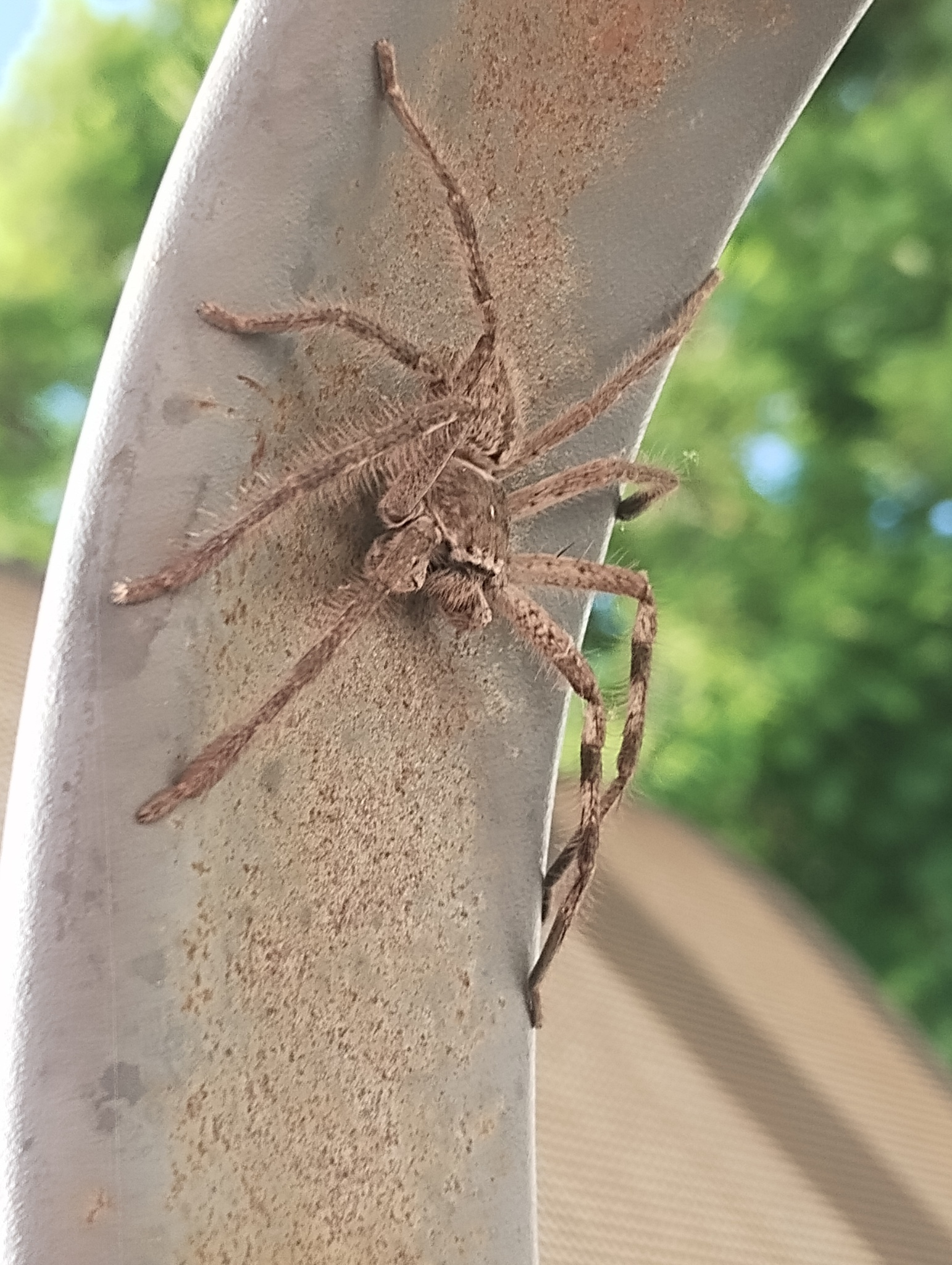

Scientific classification
- Domain: Eukaryota
- Kingdom: Animalia
- Phylum: Arthropoda
- Subphylum: Chelicerata
- Class: Arachnida
- Order: Araneae
- Infraorder: Araneomorphae
- Family: Sparassidae
- Genus: Isopedella
- Species: I. victorialis

Binomial name
- Isopedella victorialis Hirst, 1993

= Isopedella victorialis =

Species of spider

Isopedella victorialis is a species of huntsman spider endemic to Australia and also introduced to New Zealand.

== Taxonomy ==
This species was described by David Hirst in 1993 from male and female specimens. The holotype is stored in the Museum of Victoria.

== Distribution ==
This species is endemic to Victoria, Australia. It is also known to be accidentally introduced to New Zealand.
