= Scratch9 =

Scratch

Publication information
- Publisher: Hermes Press
- First appearance: Scratch9 #1 (Sept. 2010)
- Created by: Rob M. Worley

In-story information
- Full name: Scratch
- Abilities: Can summon any of his nine lives to get him out of a jam

Scratch9 is an all-ages comic featuring an ordinary house cat who can summon any of his nine lives to help him out in his adventures. It was created by Rob M. Worley and first published in September 2010 by Ape Entertainment.

== Publication history ==
Scratch9 debuted as a four-issue series in September 2010. The comic was written by Rob M. Worley with artwork by Jason T. Kruse and cover art by Mike Kunkel. The series was then collected into a trade paperback in June 2011.

The comic returned with publisher Hermes Press on May 5, 2013 as a Free Comic Book Day special edition, reprinting the original first issue with new bonus material. Hermes followed up with a two-issue series Scratch9: Cat Tails written by Worley with art by Joshua Buchanan, Shannon Eric Denton, Mike Roll, Justin Castaneda, Canaan Grall, Kruse, Joe Foo, Chris Houghton, Armand Villavert Jr and John Martin. Shane Houghton also contributed writing.

== Characters ==
=== The Nine Lives ===
- Scratch - A young, naive house cat living in present-day America. (first appearance Scratch9 #1)
- Garogga - An embattled smilodon, living in the wilderness of the ice age. (first appearance Scratch9 #1)
- Bektah - The Pharaoh's cat living in 1491 BC, Egypt invested with mystical abilities over the afterlife. (first appearance Scratch9 #2)
- Ichirou - A cat living in a Tibetan temple the 5th century. Master of martial arts. (first appearance Scratch9 #2)
- Writh - A witch's familiar living in Salem, Massachusetts, late 17th century. Practices green magic. (first appearance Scratch9 #3)
- D'Argent - A cat living in 18th century France, with powers of luck. (first appearance Scratch9 #3)
- Beeslebohm - The greatest mouser of the East London theater, circa late 19th century. Master of disguise and theatrics. (first appearance Scratch9 #3)
- N.3.K.0 - A cyborg cat from the 25th century. Various technological enhancements. (first appearance Scratch9 #2)
- Ix - A highly evolved cat from the "far, distant future." Various telepathic and telekinetic abilities. (first appearance Scratch9 #4)

=== The Supporting Cast ===
- Penelope - Scratch's best friend, a young girl. (first appearance Scratch9 #1)
- Marco - A tiny Brussels griffon dog, with a tough attitude and a mistrust of humans. (first appearance Scratch9 #1)
- Pollo - A former game-fighting chicken, best friend of Marco. (first appearance Scratch9 #1)
- Squirrelly - A squirrel. (first appearance Scratch9 #1)
- Tejan - A clumsy cat, and friend to D'Argent. (first appearance Scratch9: Cat Tails #1)
- Carabas - A lonely man, and friend to D'Argent. (first appearance Scratch9: Cat Tails #1)
- Prince Menho - A young boy, destined to be king of Egypt, and friend to Bektah. (first appearance Scratch9: Cat Tails #1)
- Sarah Nunn - A witch practicing black magic, presumed master of Writh. (first appearance Scratch9: Cat Tails #2)
- T.I.C.K - A small, bug-like electronic companion to N.3.K.0. (first appearance Scratch9: Cat Tails #2)
- Meg'n - A protective wolf (mother to Tok) whom Garogga befriends. (first appearance Scratch9: Cat Tails #1)
- Tok - A wolf cub (son of Meg'n) whom Garogga befriends. (first appearance Scratch9: Cat Tails #1)

=== The Villains ===
- Dr. Schrödinger - Aged scientist, head of C.R.U.E.L., bent on transferring his mind into a stronger, more durable body. (first appearance Scratch9 #1)
- Strick - A cat with the ability to send Scratch back in time. (first appearance Scratch9: Free Comic Book Day 2014 Special)
- The Cat Who Walks by Himself - An ancient, giant cat of supernatural origin, Strick's first aspect. (first appearance Scratch9: Cat of Nine Worlds TPB)
- Si Sawat - A treasure-hoarding cat inhabiting the mountains of old China. Strick's third aspect. (first appearance Scratch9: Cat of Nine Worlds TPB)
- Pluto - A one-eyed scoundrel of a cat, from London of the 1800s. Strick's sixth aspect. (first appearance Scratch9: Cat of Nine Worlds TPB)
- Orgul - Cat servant of Freyja, capable of generating winter storms. Strick's second aspect. (first appearance Scratch9: Cat of Nine Worlds TPB)
- Cat 13 - This cat is the subject of illegal genetic experiments, capable of self-cloning and mutation. Strick's eighth aspect. (first appearance Scratch9: Cat of Nine Worlds TPB)
- Aliento Ladrón - A warlock's familiar and black-magic practitioner. Strick's fourth aspect. (first appearance Scratch9: Cat of Nine Worlds TPB)
- Qitt - A cat with a mysterious third eye that is capable of seeing the future. Strick's fifth aspect. (first appearance Scratch9: Cat of Nine Worlds TPB)
- Za - A cat with an evolved brain from the far, distant future. Strick's ninth aspect. (first appearance Scratch9: Cat of Nine Worlds TPB)
- The Collector - A simple-minded freelancer who captures animals and sells them to C.R.U.E.L., not realizing they'll be subjected to experiments. (first appearance Scratch9 #1)
- Grizzbots - Large, bear-like, robotic henchmen of Dr. Schrödinger. (first appearance Scratch9 #1)
- Mecha-chims - Small, monkey-like, henchmen of Dr. Schrödinger. (first appearance Scratch9 #3)
- Amam - Mythic lion/crocodile/hippo hybrid demon of Egyptian mythology. Foe of Bektah. (first appearance Scratch9: Cat Tails #1)
- Gangtie Jutou - Chinese sun bear, invested with impenetrable armor. Foe of Ichirou. (first appearance Scratch9: Cat Tails #2)
- Astro Bat - Giant Bat-like creature from space. Foe of N.3.K.0. (first appearance Scratch9: Cat Tails #2)

=== Organizations ===
- C.R.U.E.L. - Corporation for Research into the Ultimate Extension of Longevity - a scientific research corporation, notorious for animal-experimentation, headed up by Dr. Schrödinger (first appearance Scratch9 #1)
- F.E.R.A.L. - Free Earth Rescue Animal Legion - A 25th century global peace-keeping force composed of cybernetically enhanced animals. (first appearance Scratch9: Cat Tails #2)

== Titles published ==
- Scratch9 #1 - Sep 2010 (Ape Entertainment)
- Scratch9 #2 - Oct 2010 (Ape Entertainment)
- Scratch9 #3 - Dec 2010 (Ape Entertainment)
- Scratch9 #4 - Jan 2011 (Ape Entertainment)
- Scratch9 TPB - June 2011 (Ape Entertainment)
- Scratch9 #1 (Free Comic Book Day Edition) - May 4, 2013 (Hermes Press)
- Scratch9: Cat Tails #1 - July 2013 (Hermes Press)
- Scratch9: Cat Tails #2 - September 2013 (Hermes Press)
- Scratch9: Free Comic Book Day 2014 Edition - May 2014 (Hermes Press)
- Scratch9: Cat of Nine Worlds #1 - June 2014 (Hermes Press)
- Scratch9: Cat of Nine Worlds TPB - July 2015 (Hermes Press)
- Scratch9: The Pet Project & Cat Tails TPB - October 2015 (Robot Monkey Worx)
