= The Revenant (comics) =

Comic book series

- Cover to the 2008 OGN The Revenant

Publication information
- Publisher: Desperado Publishing
- Schedule: Graphic Novel
- Genre: Crime Fiction
- Publication date: October 2008
- No. of issues: 1
- Main character(s): The Revenant

Creative team
- Written by: Shannon Eric Denton; Keith Giffen; Rob Worley
- Artist(s): Mateus Santolouco
- Colorist(s): Chris Wood

The Revenant is a crime fiction comic book created by Shannon Eric Denton and Keith Giffen. It has been published by Antarctic Press, Komikwerks and Desperado Publishing respectively.

The comic focuses on a mysterious, sadistic crime fighter called The Revenant bent on eliminating the criminal element in the fictitious twin cities of Sapphire City and Jade Harbor. This ghost-like figure may or may not be a reputed gangster who was killed 15 years earlier on during Sapphire City's Day of the Dead celebrations.

== Publication history ==
The comic first appeared as a short story called The Spook in the anthology comic Actionopolis in 2001, published by Antarctic Press. The eight page story was written and drawn by creator Shannon Eric Denton.

The Spook also appeared on the webcomics site Komikwerks around the same time. In 2003 Denton partnered with Keith Giffen to expand on the mythology of the character and the webcomic was retitled The Revenant.

In 2007 Image Comics (under the Shadowline imprint) solicited orders for a three-issue mini-series based on the character, written by Rob Worley and illustrated by Mateus Santolouco and slated for publication in February, March and April 2008. However, the series was not released.

Subsequently Desperado Publishing picked up the title and re solicited it as an original graphic novel. It was published in October 2008.
