= Josh Wagner =

American comic book writer

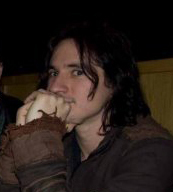
- Born: Joshua Wagner; August 19, 1975 (age 51) California, U.S.
- Area: Writer
- Pseudonym: (Sergio)
- Notable works: Fiction Clemens
- Awards: 2008 Project Fanboy Award for "Best Storyline"

Josh Wagner (born August 19, 1975) is an American novelist and playwright from Missoula, Montana. He also writes graphic novels, short stories, and screenplays. His style is heavily influenced by metafiction, folk tales, and magical realism. His work is best categorized as part of the Slipstream (genre).

== Biography ==
=== Comics ===
Wagner's first comic story appeared in the Eisner Award-nominated anthology 24Seven vol. 2, published by Image Comics in 2007. His first creator-owned mini-series, Fiction Clemens, came out in 2008 through Ape Entertainment. Fiction Clemens won an award in 2009 for "Best Storyline" from Project Fanboy. The Image Comics anthology Outlaw Territory carried stories by Wagner in volumes 1 and 2 (released 2009 and 2011 respectively). In September 2009 Image launched a five-issue series written by Wagner, called The Sky Pirates of Neo Terra, based on the Nintendo Wii and DS game of the same name. Sky Pirates is illustrated by the Canadian artist Camilla d'Errico.

=== Novels and Short Stories ===
His first short story, The Finger, was published in Lost Worlds Magazine in 1992. His personal style began to take shape in the early 2000s with short works published in surrealist journals such as The Cafe Irreal. His first novel, The Adventures of the Imagination of Periphery Stowe published in 2004 by BAM Publications, led directly to the development of Fiction Clemens. Other novels include Deadwind Sea, released in January, 2010, and Smashing Laptops, released in November, 2011. Smashing Laptops and Deadwind Sea were both reprinted in 2014 by Asymmetrical Press, the publishing group owned by The Minimalists. Two of Wagner's experiments with surreal horror fiction have been published in the acclaimed Lovecraft eZine.

Wagner recently collaborated with artist Theo Ellsworth on a short illustrated book called Mystery Mark.

His most recent novel, Shapes the Sunlight Takes, was released through Asymmetrical Press in January, 2015. In December of the same year Asymmetrical released Wagner's first collection of short stories and poetry, Nothing In Mind. He is currently living abroad, working on a series of books entitled The Changing Things.

=== Film and Stage ===
Film credits includes musical score, editing, screenwriting, and production. His first full short, Adam Funn, completed in late 2009, was a finalist in the 2nd Annual Openfilm "Get It Made" Competition.

The Montana Actor's Theater produced his first stage play Salep & Silk in the fall of 2010 in conjunction with the Silk Road restaurant and the Crystal Theater in Missoula, Montana. In 2012 his dark comedy, Ringing Out, a post-apocalyptic Christmas play, was produced in the Crystal Theater.

His one-act contemporary western, Bleach Bone, was accepted into the 2012 New Rocky Mountain Voices competition and was produced at the Historic Jones Theater in Westcliffe, Colorado during the summer of 2012. Bleach Bone, has been made into a short film featuring actress Lily Gladstone and is currently in post-production.

Wagner spearheaded a devised theatre production entitled Thisillusionment with Viscosity Theatre in 2013. Mystery Mark, a theatrical installation, launched in 2014 along with his book of the same name co-created and illustrated by artist Theo Ellsworth.

=== Poetry ===
Wagner's poetry has been published internationally in print and online magazines such as SpeedPoets and The Nervous Breakdown.
