= Joshua Becker =

American writer (born 1974)

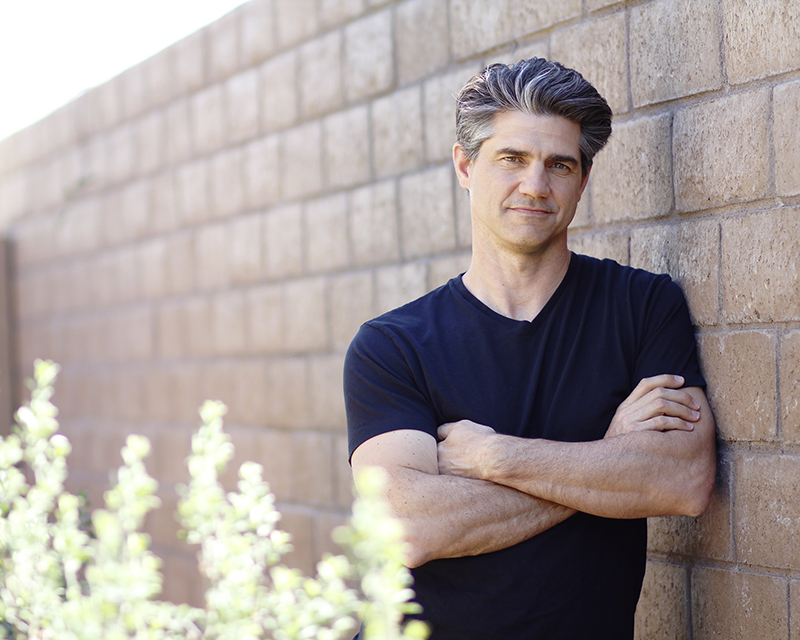
- Joshua Becker in 2019
- Born: December 11, 1974 (age 51); Aberdeen, South Dakota, U.S.
- Education: University of Nebraska Omaha
- Occupations: Writer, Pastor
- Known for: ‘’Simplify’’; ‘’The More of Less’’; ‘’The Minimalist Home’
- Website: www.becomingminimalist.com

Joshua Becker (born 1974) is an American author, writer, and philanthropist.

Becker has written six books on minimalism and intentional living, which have collectively sold hundreds of thousands of copies and have been translated from English into several languages including Chinese, Spanish, German, and Polish. In particular, his books The More of Less, The Minimalist Home and Uncluttered Faith have been named best sellers by The New York Times, The Wall Street Journal, Publishers Weekly, USA Today, Audible, and Amazon.

He has appeared live on HuffPost Live, the CBS Evening News and The Wall Street Journal. Becker has spoken publicly on his writing and on minimalism throughout America and internationally.

He maintains the website Becoming Minimalist which was named one of the top ten personal development websites by SUCCESS Magazine in 2015. He is currently a contributing writer at Forbes.

== Early life and education ==
Becker was born December 11, 1974, in Aberdeen, South Dakota, as one of twins. With a sister born about a year later, the three were close in age and had a great influence on each other. His grandfather Harold Salem, a well-known pastor in Aberdeen, instilled a strong work ethic into the children. The family moved frequently. Becker attended junior high and high school in Wahpeton, North Dakota, between 1987 and 1992. He finished high school at Burke High School in Omaha, Nebraska, and stayed there to attend the University of Nebraska Omaha, where he met his future wife. Becker completed a master's degree in theology at Bethel College and Seminary in Minnesota.

== Career ==
Becker began his career as a pastor in Vermont. In 2008, after a frustrating weekend of cleaning out the garage, Becker realized he was spending more time caring for his possessions than with his family. After this breakthrough, Becker became a writer and pioneer of the minimalism movement with his website Becoming Minimalist, which has garnered a following over a million readers a month and over a million fans on Facebook. He cited that “the practical benefits of owning less are more money, more time, more calm, more freedom.”

Becker has since downsized 75% of his possessions and written several books and a course detailing his experiences and methods of living a minimalist lifestyle. Becker moved from Vermont with his wife and two children to Arizona, where they have remained since.

He shared his family's experience as minimalists in the 2013 film Minimalism: A Documentary About the Important Things, by American filmmakers Joshua Fields Millburn and Ryan Nicodemus, known professionally as The Minimalists. He also played the role of his pastor grandfather Harold Salem in the film Heart of a Shepherd.

Inspired by his wife Kim Becker's own experience being adopted, in 2015 Becker and his wife founded The Hope Effect, a non-profit organization for orphan care.

== Publications ==
- Clutterfree with Kids: Change your thinking. Discover new habits. Free your home (2014, Becoming Minimalist) ISBN 978-0991438600
- Simplify: 7 Guiding Principles to Help Anyone Declutter Their Home & Life (2014, Digital) ASIN B006431ADS
- The More of Less: Finding the Life You Want Under Everything You Own (2016, WaterBrook) ISBN 978-1601427960
  - Polish Translation: Im mniej, tym więcej. (2017, Znak) ISBN 978-83-240-4541-9
  - Chinese Translation: 极简：在你拥有的一切之下，发现你想要的生活. (2016, 天津人民出版社 Tianjin People's) ISBN 9787201108971
  - Spanish Translation: Más con menos. (2017, Unilit) ISBN 978-0789923479
  - German Translation: Weniger macht reich: Entdecken Sie die einfachste Art, glücklich zu leben. (2017, Gerth Medien) ISBN 978-3957342270
- The Minimalist Home: A Room-by-Room Guide to a Decluttered, Refocused Life (2018, WaterBrook) ISBN 978-1601427991
- Things That Matter: Overcoming Distraction to Pursue a More Meaningful Life (2022, WaterBrook) ISBN 978-0593193976
- Uncluttered Faith: Own Less, Love More, and Make an Impact in Your World (2026, WaterBrook) ISBN 978-0593603536
