= The Minimalists: Less Is Now =

2021 American documentary film

- Promotional poster
- Directed by: Matt D'Avella
- Produced by: Tim Frazier; Jacob Matthew
- Starring: Joshua Fields Millburn; Ryan Nicodemus
- Cinematography: Matt D'Avella; Conrad Golovac; Chris Newhard
- Edited by: Matt D'Avella
- Music by: Vve
- Production company: Booklight Productions
- Distributed by: Netflix
- Release date: January 1, 2021
- Running time: 53 minutes
- Country: United States
- Language: English

The Minimalists: Less Is Now is a 2021 American documentary film created for Netflix and directed by Matt D'Avella. The story focuses on two friends, Joshua Fields Millburn and Ryan Nicodemus, better known as the Minimalists, who demonstrate the benefits of living according to minimalism. The film was released on January 1, 2021, and was nominated for a Daytime Emmy in 2022.

== Reception ==
Architectural Digest, in a review of the film, wrote, "Less Is Now challenges viewers to live with less stuff".

Now called the film "a cluttered and messy documentary that feels much longer than its running time." It compared the Minimalists unfavorably with organizing consultant Marie Kondo, claiming that "Kondo's revolutionary Tidying Up series is more entertaining—and useful."
