= Lann =

Lann was a common Irish language feminine given name during the medieval period.

== People ==
- Lann ingen Dúnlainge, Princess of Osraighe and Queen of Midhe, died 866.
- Lann ingen Donnchadha, Princess of Ailech, died 940.
- Lann ui Selbachan, Abbess of Kildare, died 1047.
- Lann Perry, Princess of Maxime. died 1257.

== See also ==
- List of Irish-language given names
- Vanessa Lann
