= Daniel Herman (publisher) =

American publisher (born 1957)

- Born: March 2, 1957 (age 69)
- Areas: Writer, Publisher

Daniel Herman (born March 2, 1957) is an American attorney and the founder of Hermes Press, a comic book publication company based in New Castle, Pennsylvania, United States.

== Career ==
Herman is the current president of Hermes Press, a comics publishing company he founded in 2001. Herman is also a partner in the law firm Geer and Herman, P.C. In his law practice, he primarily works as a trial attorney.

In addition to running Hermes as its publisher, Herman does graphic design work along with the employed graphic designers at the company. He also is the person primarily in charge of finding the source material used in Hermes Press reprints such as The Phantom.

Herman is also a comics historian, having written several books on the topic of the Silver Age of comics, and a book on Gil Kane, the artist who created the modern Green Lantern.

== Personal life ==
In 2015, Herman provided artwork from his collection for the Art of 007 exhibit at the ToonSeum.
