= Earl Oliver Hurst =

American cartoonist and illustrator (1898–1958)

Earl Oliver Hurst (1898–1958) was an American cartoonist and illustrator known for his work in thousands of book and magazine pages over the course of his four-decade career, particularly in Collier's magazine.

Hurst was born in Buffalo, New York, and served in World War I. He started his career at the Cleveland Plains Dealer and simultaneously took night classes at the Cleveland School of Art. Hurst then worked as the art director at a direct mail business, and realized that unapproved media outlets, even national publications, were stealing his art and designs. This encouraged Hurst to pursue a larger, more prominent career. In addition to editorial illustrations, he created advertisements for clients including Nabisco and General Electric. He was known for his vibrant, colorful style.

In one instance, Hurst walked around a store for several hours before beginning his illustration of Christmas shoppers.

The book Forty Illustrator and How they Work contains a profile of Hurst: "Hurst’s humor is that of character. It springs from a deep understanding of human nature and a feeling of sympathy—albeit mirthful— for those who find themselves victims of predicaments…. Some of his biggest laughs have been at his own expense."
