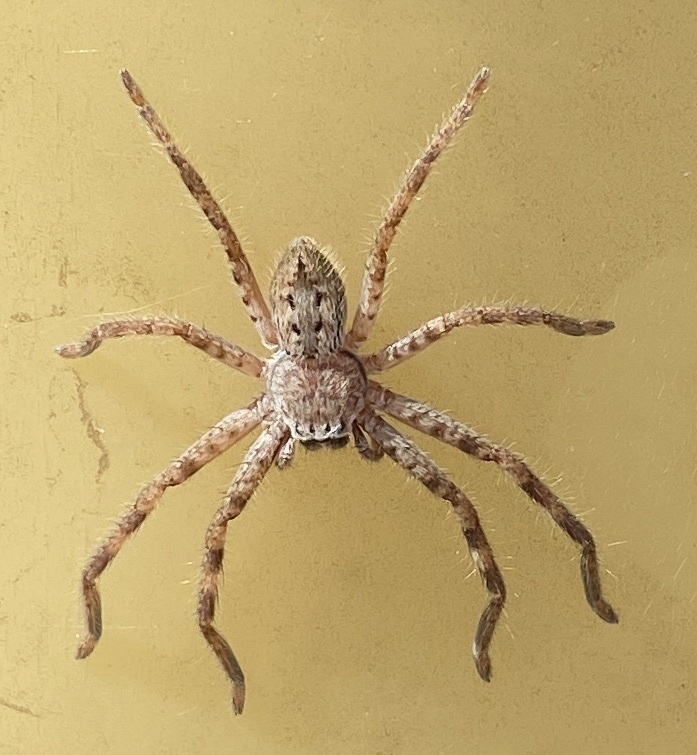
- Isopedella cana

Scientific classification
- Kingdom: Animalia
- Phylum: Arthropoda
- Subphylum: Chelicerata
- Class: Arachnida
- Order: Araneae
- Infraorder: Araneomorphae
- Family: Sparassidae
- Genus: Isopedella; Hirst, 1990

Type species
- I. pessleri (Thorell, 1870)

Species
- 18, see text

= Isopedella =

Genus of spiders

Isopedella is a genus of huntsman spiders that was first described by David B. Hirst in 1990.

== Species ==
As of September 2019 it contains eighteen species, all from Australia except for Isopedella terangana, found on the Aru Islands of eastern Indonesia:

- Isopedella ambathala Hirst, 1993 – Australia (Queensland, South Australia)
- Isopedella cana (Simon, 1908) – Australia (Western Australia, South Australia)
- Isopedella castanea Hirst, 1993 – Australia (Western Australia)
- Isopedella cerina Hirst, 1993 – Australia (Queensland)
- Isopedella cerussata (Simon, 1908) – Australia
- Isopedella conspersa (L. Koch, 1875) – Australia (Queensland, Northern Territory)
- Isopedella flavida (L. Koch, 1875) – Australia (Queensland, New South Wales)
- Isopedella frenchi (Hogg, 1903) – Australia (Victoria, South Australia)
- Isopedella gibsandi Hirst, 1993 – Australia (Western Australia)
- Isopedella inola (Strand, 1913) – Australia
- Isopedella leai (Hogg, 1903) – Australia (South Australia)
- Isopedella maculosa Hirst, 1993 – Australia (Western Australia)
- Isopedella meraukensis (Chrysanthus, 1965) – New Guinea, Australia (Queensland, Northern Territory)
- Isopedella pessleri (Thorell, 1870) (type) – Australia (New South Wales, Victoria)
- Isopedella saundersi (Hogg, 1903) – Australia
- Isopedella terangana (Strand, 1911) – Indonesia (Aru Is.)
- Isopedella tindalei Hirst, 1993 – Australia
- Isopedella victorialis Hirst, 1993 – Australia (Victoria)
