= Johnny Hazard =

American comic strip by Frank Robbins

Frank Robbins' Johnny Hazard (June 6, 1960)

Johnny Hazard is an action-adventure comic strip created by cartoonist Frank Robbins for King Features Syndicate. It was published from June 5, 1944, until August 20, 1977, with separate storylines for the daily strip and the Sunday strip.

== Day before D-Day ==
After work in advertising, Robbins took over the daily strip Scorchy Smith from Noel Sickles in 1939 with a Sunday page added in 1940. King Features then asked Robbins to do Secret Agent X-9, but Robbins instead chose to devise an aviation comic for the syndicate, and Johnny Hazard was launched on Monday, June 5, 1944, one day before D-Day. While working on the strip during the 1940s, Robbins contributed illustrations to Life, Look, The Saturday Evening Post and other magazines. Robbins stopped drawing Johnny Hazard in 1977 and retired to Mexico in order to devote himself to painting full-time.

== Characters and story ==
The strip followed the globe-trotting adventures of aviator Johnny Hazard, initially as a member of the United States Army Air Corps in World War II, later as a Cold War secret agent. Comics historian Don Markstein described the transition:

As the story opened, Johnny, like most American men of his generation, was fighting World War II. But his gig with the Army Air Corps didn't last long, as D-Day came when the strip was only a day old. But the only effect civilian life had on him was to enlarge the scope of his adventures—as a freelance pilot, Johnny ranged throughout the entire world. (An early focus, tho, was China, putting him head-to-head with the rival Chicago Tribune Syndicate's Terry and the Pirates.) Johnny dealt with spies, beautiful women, smugglers, gorgeous dames, sci-fi style menaces, fabulous chicks and all the other kinds of folks a two-fisted adventurer of his calibre would be expected to deal with. As he did, unlike many fictional two-fisted adventurers, he matured—not as quickly as real people, but after a third of a century or so, he was quite gray at the temples. And a third of a century was as long as the strip ran. It was popular enough at first, and ran far longer than most post-war adventure strips, but the times were against it. Newspaper editors were more interested in daily gags than continuous stories, and Johnny Hazard succumbed to the trend in 1977.

== International Distribution ==
Johnny Hazard was reprinted in the British comic Rocket during the 1950s. The strip was also translated into nine other languages, and was widely published in Western European newspapers.

== Reception ==
According to biographer Mark Evanier, Jack Kirby expressed admiration for Johnny Hazard. Comics historian Ron Goulart described Johnny Hazard as "an impressively drawn and scripted feature."

== Reprints ==
Robbins' Johnny Hazard comic book was published by Standard Comics from August 1948 to May 1949. The Sunday strips were reprinted in a full-color volume published by the Pacific Comics Club. Other reprints were published by Pioneer Comics and Dragon Lady Press.

In 2011, Hermes Press announced a hardcover archive reprint series, with separate volumes for daily and Sunday strips.

== Archives ==
The Frank Robbins collection at Syracuse University has 1090 original Johnny Hazard strips, consisting of 934 daily strips and 156 Sunday strips.

== 1963–66 story arcs ==
Frank Robbins' Johnny Hazard (June 29, 1958)

=== Daily strip continuities ===
- "Wheel and Deal" (4 Feb 1963 – 27 Apr 1963)
- "My Son the Millionaire" (29 Apr 1963 – 20 Jul 1963)
- "The Mink-Lined Nest" (23 Jul 1963 – 12 Oct 1963)
- "Mysterious Friend" (14 Oct 1963 – 4 Jan 1964)
- "A Gift for Florian" (6 Jan 1964 – 28 Mar 1964)
- "Extortion Inc." (30 Mar 1964 – 27 Jun 1964)
- "Traders in Death" (29 Jun 1964 – 19 Sep 1964)
- "Alphabet Soup" (21 Sep 1964 – 26 Dec 1964)
- "Operation Beardles" (28 Dec 1964 – 20 Mar 1965)
- "Tell It to Telstar" (22 Mar 1965 – 5 June 1965)
- "Operation Trojan Horse" (30 Aug 1965 – 20 Nov 1965)
- "Rescue Inc." (22 Nov 1965 – 19 Feb 1966)
- "The Many Faces of Henry Clay" (21 Feb 1966 – 7 May 1966)

=== Sunday strip continuities ===
Johnny Hazard #7 (April 1949)

- "Capone Squadron" (6 Jan 1963 – 13 Jan 1963)
- "Operation Bodyguard" (20 Jan 1963 – 5 May 1963)
- "The Diamond Mountain" (12 May 1963 – 25 Aug 1963)
- "Disaster Area" (1 Sep 1963 – 8 Dec 1963)
- "Head-Locked Secret" (15 Dec 1963 – 22 Mar 1964)
- "Sentimental Journey" (5 April 1964 – 19 Jul 1964)
- "Fatal Lure" (26 Jul 1964 – 8 Nov 1964)
- "Commando Isle" (15 Nov 1964 – 7 Mar 1965)
- "Tea for Two?" (14 Mar 1965 – 20 Jun 1965)
- "The Big Gamble" (4 Jul 1965 – 3 Oct 1965)
- "Cargo Cult" (17 Oct 1965 – 30 Jan 1966)
- "The Kono Affair" (6 Feb 1966 – 27 Feb 1966)
