= Barking spider =

Barking spider is a common name for several tarantulas from Australia and may refer to:

- Selenocosmia crassipes
- Selenocosmia stirlingi
