= The Minimalists =

American group promoting simple living

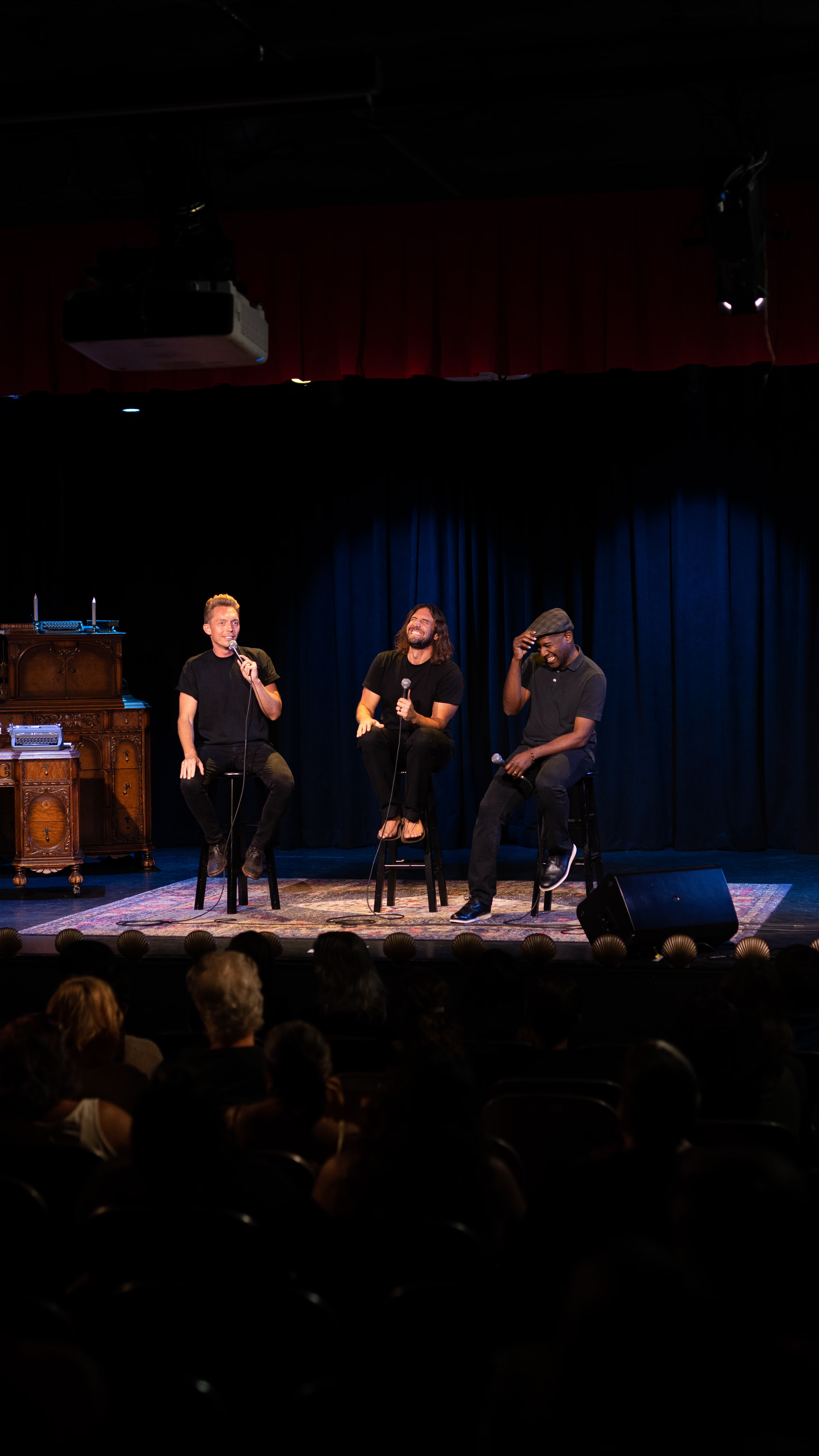
- Millburn (left), Nicodemus (center), and Coleman speaking in 2022

Background information
- Origin: Dayton, Ohio, U.S.
- Genres: Minimalism, simple living, memoir, self-help
- Occupations: Authors, podcasters, filmmakers, public speakers
- Members: Joshua Fields Millburn; Ryan Nicodemus; T.K. Coleman
- Website: theminimalists.com

The Minimalists are American authors, podcasters, filmmakers, and public speakers Joshua Fields Millburn and Ryan Nicodemus, who promote a minimalist lifestyle. They are known for the Netflix documentaries Minimalism (2016) and the Emmy-nominated Less Is Now (2021); the New York Times bestselling book Love People, Use Things (2021); The Minimalists Podcast; and their minimalism blog. Educator T.K. Coleman joined The Minimalists as podcast co-host in August 2022.

== Early life and corporate careers ==
Millburn was born June 29, 1981, in Dayton, Ohio; his family often lived on food stamps. Nicodemus was also born in 1981 and raised as a Jehovah's Witness; his parents separated when he was seven. His family moved around when he was a child, eventually settling in Ohio when he was eight years old. Both Millburn and Nicodemus experienced alcohol and drug abuse in their childhood homes. They became close friends as elementary school students.

By age 28, both Millburn and Nicodemus held managerial positions at a regional telecommunications company. Millburn was the director of operations in charge of 150 retail stores; Nicodemus handled sales and marketing. Millburn had everything he ever wanted and bought things he did not need, but he was in debt and unhappy. A reporter for the Birmingham News called them "the embodiment of upwardly mobile, busy, fashionable, unhealthy, wasteful young professionals."

== Embracing minimalism ==
Millburn's mother died of lung cancer in October 2009. In the same month, his marriage ended. Rather than renting a storage unit for his late mother's possessions, Millburn donated them. He then discovered Colin Wright, a minimalist and traveler. Millburn connected with other minimalists—Leo Babauta, Courtney Carver, and Joshua Becker, among others—and began to adopt a minimalist lifestyle. He moved into a smaller home and soon helped Nicodemus to do the same. Nicodemus adopted a similar philosophy to Millburn, organizing a "packing party" and disposing of most items he owned in a few weeks.

== Career as the Minimalists ==
Millburn and Nicodemus launched their website in 2010. They have since published books, launched a podcast, and produced two feature-length documentaries. They have spoken at Harvard, Apple, and Google, and they have given three TEDx Talks: "A Rich Life with Less," "The Art of Letting Go," and "Scrolling Is the New Smoking."

In 2011, still working corporately, Millburn was asked to craft a plan to close eight retail stores and terminate 41 workers. Millburn chose to resign in protest. Shortly after, Nicodemus was laid off. Later in 2011, they self-published their first book, Minimalism: Live a Meaningful Life, and went on a 33-city book tour.

In 2012, Millburn and Nicodemus left Dayton and moved to Philipsburg, Montana, where they wrote the first draft of their memoir, Everything That Remains. The Boston Globe referred to this experiment as living "like Henry David Thoreau, but with Wi-Fi."

In 2013, they moved to Missoula, Montana and founded a publishing company, Asymmetrical Press, with minimalist Colin Wright; it has since has published more than 30 fiction and nonfiction titles for nine authors. Asymmetrical Press republished Millburn's semi-autobiographical novel about a struggling singer-songwriter, As a Decade Fades. Also in 2013, Nicodemus, Millburn, and Wright went on two speaking tours: March's "Spring into Minimalism Tour" in the United States, and June's "Alberta Mini-Tour" in Calgary and Edmonton.

In 2014, the Minimalists published their memoir, Everything That Remains. To support the book, they went on a ten-month, 119-event bookstore tour. During their 2014 tour, Millburn and Nicodemus established Minimalist.org, a website with 100 free local meetup groups in eight countries. Groups meet monthly to discuss minimalism, decluttering, careers, finances, relationships, and more.

In 2015, they published Essential, an essay collection promoted as "the best of the Minimalists." The book included many of their most popular online writings plus some new essays. That spring they were joined by several authors from Asymmetrical Press, as well as the musician Skye Steele, for their "Wordtasting Tour," visiting 42 cities across the western United States and Canada. At the end of the year, they started The Minimalists Podcast, an audio and video show in which they discuss minimalism, decluttering, and simple living.

Millburn and Nicodemus released the first episode of The Minimalists Podcast in December 2015. Originally recorded in a conference room at the University of Montana, it has been recorded at the Minimalists' studio in Hollywood, California, since 2018. On the podcast, Millburn and Nicodemus bring a guest into their studio to answer audience questions and to discuss "what it means to live a meaningful life with less." Previous guests include 2020 United States presidential candidate Pete Buttigieg, actress Jennette McCurdy, former megachurch pastor Rob Bell, writer Glennon Doyle, columnist Dan Savage, and scientist Andrew McAfee, among others.

The Minimalists do not sell advertising time, believing it would be hypocritical to write about minimalism while advertising material products. Their podcast is listener-supported. They sometimes begin episodes of their podcast with the phrase, "This episode of the Minimalists is brought to you by nobody because advertisements suck." Millburn expanded on this stance in an essay entitled "Can We Have an Honest Conversation About Advertisements?"

In 2016, the Minimalists released their first feature-length film, Minimalism: A Documentary About the Important Things, directed by Matt D'Avella. The film features interviews with journalist Dan Harris, sociology professor Juliet Schor, and neuroscientist Sam Harris, among others, and follows Millburn and Nicodemus during their 2014 tour. Before its theatrical release, the Minimalists visited fourteen U.S. and Canadian cities on their "Documentary Tour" to premiere the film with live audiences. Originally released by Gathr Films on May 24, 2016, it played in roughly 400 theaters in the United States, Canada, and Australia.

Millburn and Nicodemus partnered with Minimalissimo magazine and online publication 5 Style in 2016 to create Minimalism Life, a project that houses community journal articles, minimalist wallpapers, and a series of letters called Inside Minimalism.

In 2017, the Minimalists set out on their 50-city "Less Is Now Tour," presented by Live Nation, across America, Canada, Australia, and New Zealand. Also in 2017, they moved to Los Angeles, California. In 2018, Millburn and Nicodemus traveled to the U.S. South with a team of financial experts from Ramsey Solutions for their “Simply Southern Tour,” the theme of which was “money and minimalism.”

In 2019, production began on their second feature-length film, The Minimalists: Less Is Now, also directed by D'Avella. The documentary was released worldwide by Netflix on January 1, 2021, and features interviews with radio host Dave Ramsey, Greenpeace USA’s executive director Annie Leonard, pastor and futurist Erwin McManus, and others.

In 2020, the Minimalists finished writing their fourth book, Love People, Use Things: Because the Opposite Never Works, a relationship book that was written to “move past simple decluttering [and] show how minimalism makes room to reevaluate and heal the seven essential relationships in our lives.” Love People, Use Things was published on July 13, 2021, by Celadon (Macmillan Publishers Ltd) in the United States and Canada, and Hachette in the United Kingdom and Australia.

In January 2021, The Today Show selected Less Is Now for “Hoda and Jenna’s Documentary of the Month Club.” In 2022, The Minimalists: Less Is Now, was nominated for a Daytime Emmy award for “Outstanding Directing Team for a Single Camera Daytime Nonfiction Program.” That same year, the Minimalists completed their 20-city Love People, Use Things book tour in North America.

In December 2024, The Minimalists were featured as an answer on the game show Jeopardy!: "Simple-living duo Joshua Fields Millburn and Ryan Nicodemus are proponents of this, where less is more."

== Reception ==
The Minimalists have been covered broadly by the media. They have been featured in the New York Times, Wall Street Journal, USA Today, Seattle Times, San Francisco Chronicle, Forbes, Time, The Atlantic, The New Yorker, New York Magazine, and they have been featured on the Today show, CBS This Morning, Good Morning America, Nightline, and many other outlets. The Pittsburgh Post-Gazette called the duo "dogma-free exemplars of a less-is-more lifestyle that actually sounds sane as they explain it."

GQ estimated the Minimalists have a following of around 20 million people. In 2016, the Washington Post estimated the blog had a readership of five million readers.

The Chicago Tribune said, "They call themselves 'the minimalists,' but a more apt title might be 'the meaningfulists.'" Slate referred to the Minimalists as "the country's leading evangelists on the virtues of living with less." And the Orlando Sentinel claimed that "Joshua Fields Millburn and Ryan Nicodemus—The Minimalists—made minimalism cool."

New York Magazine wrote that The Minimalists had become the ringleaders of the minimalist living movement due to the "charm of their buddy-act". Millburn and Nicodemus notoriously greet fans with a hug, often enough that they have been labeled "huggers" by certain media outlets.

The Minimalists have, however, been accused of being "elitists" whose message is "aesthetically crafted from a place of privilege." After attending one of the Minimalists' live talks in Cincinnati in 2017, Kyle Chayka, a writer for New York Magazine, said the event was "halfway between a TED Talk and a hipster-megachurch sermon—the crowd [was there] for easy answers delivered in familiar patterns...[T]hough, on the surface, their message is more or less positive, there's a tacit pessimism to Millburn and Nicodemus's movement. Rather than trying to change this mindset of austerity (whether through therapy, politics, or protest), they advocate making do with the lack." Chayka also criticizes the Minimalists' "relentless self-promotion" in the same article.

Critiquing the privileged background of the Minimalists in the New Yorker, Jia Tolentino writes, "It is rarely acknowledged, by either the life-hack-minded authors or the proponents of minimalist design, that many people have minimalism forced upon them by circumstances that render impossible a serene, jewel-box lifestyle. Nor do they mention that poverty and trauma can make frivolous possessions seem like a lifeline rather than a burden." Like Tolentino, various critics see "minimalism as a lifestyle that smacks of privilege—a form of conspicuous un-consumption," according to the Star Tribune in Minnesota. "People who are poor have no choice but to get by with less....Indeed, images of curated spaces on Pinterest showing off white bedspreads and sparse furniture suggest that minimalism can become just another version of keeping up with the Joneses."

In a New York Times op-ed, Stephanie Land called into question the class politics of decluttering. "Suddenly, decluttering is everywhere," she wrote. "But minimalism is a virtue only when it's a choice, and it's telling that its fan base is clustered in the well-off middle class. For people who are not so well off, the idea of opting to have even less is not really an option." She then accuses Millburn and Nicodemus's anti-consumerism movement of being "just another form of social shaming."

Jillian Steinhauer, in New Republic, opined that the Minimalists overlook systemic causes of consumerism, writing, "Millburn and Nicodemus's 2016 film Minimalism: A Documentary About the Important Things combines footage of people storming big-box stores for sales with social scientists talking about how advertising drives us to consume, but the word 'capitalism' is never uttered during its 78 minutes. I caught one mention of 'inequality.' Instead of digging into systemic problems like poverty or exploring ideas of wealth redistribution, the film frames having less as an individual, moral choice with no political strings or implications."

Another Globe and Mail article, "Consumerism Is Good for the Soul," by Margaret Wente, outlines what she perceives as the Minimalists' hypocrisy: "[Millburn] bought a lot of stuff, but it didn't make him happy. So he ditched his job, his house, his car and his wife and moved to a cabin in Montana with his best friend, Ryan, who was also sick and tired of empty material success. 'Less is more,' he says. Now the two have launched a cottage (or cabin) industry advising other people on how to live minimally, which includes a book you can buy for $14.83 on Amazon."

In an article titled "Your 'Minimalist' Lifestyle Is Quasi-Religious Anti-Poor Bullshit," Vice (magazine) condemned the Minimalists as "glowing examples of asceticism-as-solution," ascribing "deeply religious" motives to their movement and noting that they "just happen to be close friends with evangelical legend Rob Bell." The article goes on to claim that "'slow' and 'simple' stuff tends to be considerably more expensive and time-consuming than buying [things at] Walmart or Tim Hortons."

== Other projects ==
=== Bandit Coffee Co. ===
Alongside Sarah and Joshua Weaver, Millburn and Nicodemus opened Bandit Coffee Co., a coffeehouse and cafe in St. Petersburg, Florida, in 2016.

=== Philanthropy ===
With the support of their followers, the Minimalists contributed to various philanthropic projects throughout the 2010s. During that decade, they built two orphanages, provided relief to the victims of Hurricane Harvey, supported the survivors of the Orlando and Las Vegas mass shootings, funded a high school for a year in Kenya, installed clean-water wells in three countries, constructed an elementary school in Laos, and purchased thousands of mosquito nets to fight malaria in Africa.

In 2020, they raised money to help build Gem City Market, a nonprofit grocery co-op in their hometown, Dayton, Ohio, which has one of the largest food deserts in the United States.

In 2022, the Minimalists partnered with Ramsey Education to “teach personal finance to every middle- and high-school student in Dayton.” Their efforts provided the Foundations in Personal Finance curriculum to many schools in Ohio.

== Works ==
=== Nonfiction ===
- 2011, Minimalism (Asymmetrical), self-help
- 2014, Everything That Remains (Asymmetrical), memoir
- 2015, Essential (Asymmetrical), essays
- 2021, Love People, Use Things (Celadon/Macmillan), relationships

=== Fiction ===
- 2012, As a Decade Fades (Asymmetrical), novel, by Millburn

=== Documentaries ===
- 2016, Minimalism: A Documentary About the Important Things (Netflix)
- 2021, The Minimalists: Less Is Now (Netflix)

=== Online Courses ===
- Simplify Everything
