= Hermes Press =

American publisher

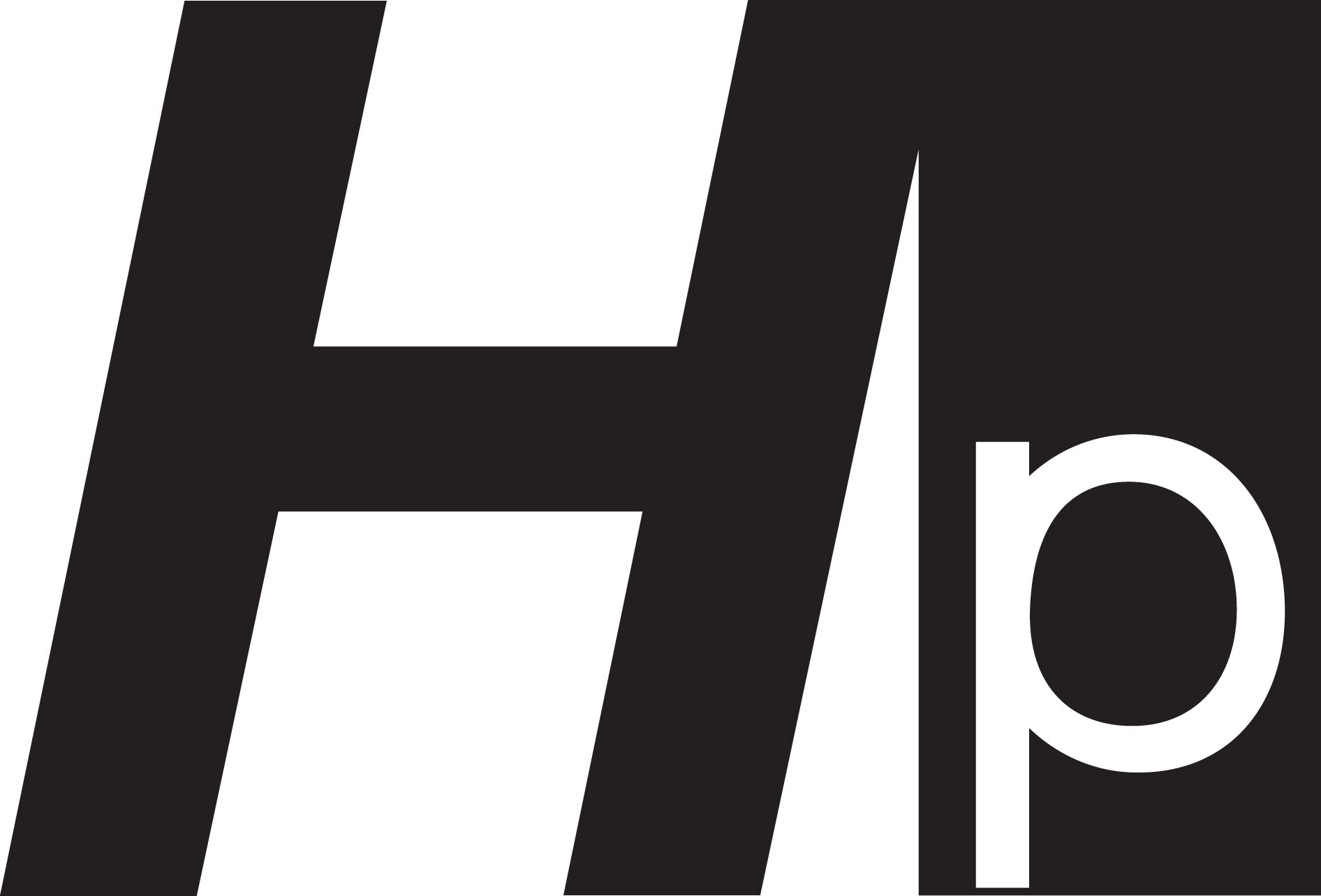
- Founded: 2000
- Headquarters location: New Castle, Pennsylvania, US
- Distribution: Diamond Book Distributors
- Key people: Daniel Herman, Publisher, Kandice Hartner, Production Manager
- Publication types: Comics
- Official website: www.hermespress.com

Hermes Press is an American publisher of art books, comic books, and comic book reprints. The company was founded in 2000 and is best known for their archival reprints of classic comic book and strip series and art books.

== History ==
Hermes Press was formed in 2000 by Daniel Herman. It is located in New Castle, Pennsylvania. In its first years of operation it published a limited amount of special-interest books: Gil Kane: Art of the Comics, written by Herman (2001); Gil Kane: Art and Interviews" (2002); "Bill Sienkiewicz: Precursor" (2002); "Works of Art: Joe Chiodo" (2003). From there Herman focused on comic strip series reprints (Star Hawks, Buck Rogers, The Phantom, et al.), and later comic book series reprints and newly commissioned comic book adaptations and other original works.

In 2009 Hermes Press entered into an agreement with Dan Curtis Productions to reprint the Gold Key comic of Dark Shadows, signifying Hermes's entrance into large-scale reprints, followed closely by their agreement with King Features Syndicate to reprint The Phantom.

== Art books ==
Hermes Press has published several books on art and artists, including traditional mediums such as pin-up art to movie poster art, and including Joe Chiodo and Carl Lundgren.

In 2016 Hermes produced a monograph of the art of Alex Raymond, the creator of Secret Agent X-9 and Rip Kirby, among many others. The essay in the book was written by comics historian Ron Goulart.

Hermes Press published The Art of George Wilson in 2025.

== Series reprints ==
Hermes Press has reprinted comics such as Mike Hammer, Dark Shadows, Alex Toth's Zorro, and George Wunder's Terry and the Pirates. In 2015 Hermes announced their reprint of Lee Falk's first comic creation, Mandrake the Magician, specifically the King years of the comic books.

=== Buck Rogers ===
In 2008 Hermes Press began reprinting the Buck Rogers comic strip, which began syndication in 1929. They also published the Murphy Anderson years independent of their sequential continuities.

=== Dark Shadows ===
Starting in 2010 Hermes Press reprinted the complete Gold Key comic book series in five volumes.

Hermes also reprinted the complete run of the Ken Bald newspaper strips.

In 2020 Hermes began reprinting the Paperback Library softcover novels written by Marilyn Ross.

=== The Phantom ===
In 2009 Hermes Press began reprinting the original comic strip continuity of The Phantom, starting with the Lee Falk's strips and continuing through the complete run of the strip. Each year since Hermes has published at least one volume of Phantom daily strips, and published two Sunday strip continuities as of 2014. Each of the dailies reprints cover at least one year of continuity for the series, and the reprints are expected to continue.

In 2016 Hermes acquired the rights to reprint the Avon Phantom pocket books; they started publishing bi-monthly in August 2016.

=== Walt Kelly's Pogo ===
From 2014 to 2018 the Dell Comics comic book version of Pogo in six hardcover books. Volume's One and Two received an Eisner nomination

== Comics history ==
Besides comic reprints, Hermes Press has also published books written on comics history, such as Silver Age, which is a historical text written on the artists behind the characters created in the Silver Age of Comic Books.

Hermes Press has also published a biography of Walt Kelly, the creator of Pogo, a history of artist John Buscema, and other books focusing on the history of comic books.

In 2007 Hermes Press published the biography of British television producer Sylvia Anderson, My FAB Years, which was about her involvement in the industry. Hermes Press also published a book on Mike Trim, who created many of the models used in Thunderbirds Are GO and similar titles.

In 2013 Hermes Press published a biography of artist Frank Frazetta, written by his son, which was printed in connection with Famous Monsters of Filmland.

== Original comics ==
Hermes Press printed an original mini-series of The Phantom in November 2014 written by Peter David, with art by Sal Velluto, in a six-comic arc that finished in early 2016.

In 2019 Hermes published an original graphic novel, Mother Goth Rhymes, which was a collection of "revisited nursery rhymes with dark, gothic twists." It premiered at San Diego Comic-Con.
