= List of Netflix original films (2021) =

Netflix is an American global on-demand Internet streaming media provider, that has distributed a number of original programs, including original series, specials, miniseries, documentaries and films. Netflix's original films also include content that was first screened on cinematic release in other countries or given exclusive broadcast in other territories, and is then described as Netflix original content.

== Feature films ==
Title	Release date	Genre	Runtime	Language
What Happened to Mr. Cha?	January 1, 2021	Comedy	1 h 42 min	Korean
Pieces of a Woman	January 7, 2021	Drama	2 h 6 min	English
Stuck Apart	January 8, 2021	Drama	1 h 36 min	Turkish
The Heartbreak Club	January 14, 2021	Comedy drama	1 h 41 min	Indonesian
Double Dad	January 15, 2021	Comedy drama	1 h 45 min	Portuguese
Outside the Wire	January 15, 2021	Action / science fiction	1 h 55 min	English
Tribhanga – Tedhi Medhi Crazy	January 15, 2021	Drama	1 h 35 min	Hindi
The White Tiger	January 22, 2021	Drama	2 h 5 min	English
June & Kopi	January 28, 2021	Drama	1 h 30 min	Indonesian
Finding ʻOhana	January 29, 2021	Family	2 h 3 min	English
The Dig	January 29, 2021	Drama	1 h 52 min	English
Below Zero	January 29, 2021	Drama	1 h 46 min	Spanish
The Last Paradiso	February 5, 2021	Romantic drama	1 h 47 min	Italian
Malcolm & Marie	February 5, 2021	Romantic drama	1 h 46 min	English
Space Sweepers	February 5, 2021	Science fiction	2 h 16 min	Korean
The Misadventures of Hedi and Cokeman	February 10, 2021	Comedy	1 h 39 min	French
Red Dot	February 11, 2021	Thriller	1 h 26 min	Swedish
Squared Love	February 11, 2021	Romantic comedy	1 h 42 min	Polish
To All the Boys: Always and Forever	February 12, 2021	Romantic comedy	1 h 55 min	English
Geez & Ann	February 25, 2021	Romantic drama	1 h 45 min	Indonesian
Crazy About Her	February 26, 2021	Romantic comedy	1 h 42 min	Spanish
The Girl on the Train	February 26, 2021	Thriller	2 h	Hindi
Moxie	March 3, 2021	Drama	1 h 51 min	English
Sentinelle	March 5, 2021	Action	1 h 20 min	French
Yes Day	March 12, 2021	Comedy	1 h 29 min	English
Paper Lives	March 12, 2021	Drama	1 h 37 min	Turkish
Get the Goat	March 18, 2021	Comedy	1 h 38 min	Portuguese
Caught by a Wave	March 25, 2021	Romantic teen drama	1 h 39 min	Italian
A Week Away	March 26, 2021	Christian musical	1 h 37 min	English
Bad Trip	March 26, 2021	Hidden-camera prank comedy	1 h 26 min	English
Pagglait	March 26, 2021	Comedy drama	1 h 54 min	Hindi
Tersanjung the Movie	April 1, 2021	Drama	1 h 54 min	Indonesian
Concrete Cowboy	April 2, 2021	Drama	1 h 51 min	English
Just Say Yes	April 2, 2021	Romantic comedy	1 h 37 min	Dutch
Madame Claude	April 2, 2021	Drama	1 h 52 min	French
Have You Ever Seen Fireflies?	April 9, 2021	Comedy	1 h 54 min	Turkish
Night in Paradise	April 9, 2021	Drama	2 h 12 min	Korean
Thunder Force	April 9, 2021	Superhero comedy	1 h 47 min	English
Prime Time	April 14, 2021	Thriller	1 h 32 min	Polish
Ride or Die	April 15, 2021	Psychological thriller drama	2 h 22 min	Japanese
Ajeeb Daastaans	April 16, 2021	Drama	2 h 22 min	Hindi
Get the Grift	April 28, 2021	Comedy	1 h 35 min	Portuguese
Things Heard & Seen	April 29, 2021	Horror	2 h 1 min	English
The Disciple	April 30, 2021	Drama	2 h 8 min	Marathi
Milestone	May 7, 2021	Drama	1 h 37 min	Hindi
Monster	May 7, 2021	Drama	1 h 39 min	English
Oxygen	May 12, 2021	Science fiction thriller	1 h 41 min	French
Ferry	May 14, 2021	Crime drama	1 h 47 min	Dutch
I Am All Girls	May 14, 2021	Thriller	1 h 47 min	English
The Woman in the Window	May 14, 2021	Psychological thriller	1 h 41 min	English
Sardar Ka Grandson	May 18, 2021	Comedy	2 h 19 min	Hindi
Army of the Dead	May 21, 2021	Zombie/heist	2 h 28 min	English
Baggio: The Divine Ponytail	May 26, 2021	Biopic	1 h 32 min	Italian
Ghost Lab	May 26, 2021	Horror	1 h 57 min	Thai
Blue Miracle	May 27, 2021	Drama	1 h 36 min	English
Carnaval	June 2, 2021	Comedy	1 h 35 min	Portuguese
Dancing Queens	June 3, 2021	Drama	1 h 51 min	Swedish
Sweet & Sour	June 4, 2021	Romantic drama	1 h 42 min	Korean
Trippin' with the Kandasamys	June 4, 2021	Comedy	1 h 33 min	English
Xtreme	June 4, 2021	Action	1 h 52 min	Spanish
Awake	June 9, 2021	Science fiction thriller	1 h 37 min	English
Tragic Jungle	June 9, 2021	Drama	1 h 36 min	Spanish
Skater Girl	June 11, 2021	Coming-of-age sports drama	1 h 49 min	Hindi
Ali & Ratu Ratu Queens	June 17, 2021	Comedy drama	1 h 40 min	Indonesian
Jagame Thandhiram	June 18, 2021	Action thriller	2 h 38 min	Tamil
Good on Paper	June 23, 2021	Comedy	1 h 34 min	English
America: The Motion Picture	June 30, 2021	Animation / comedy / historical fiction	1 h 38 min	English
Fear Street Part 1: 1994	July 2, 2021	Teen horror / slasher	1 h 47 min	English
The 8th Night	July 2, 2021	Thriller film	1 h 55 min	Korean
Haseen Dillruba	July 2, 2021	Romantic thriller	2 h 15 min	Hindi
Fear Street Part 2: 1978	July 9, 2021	Teen horror / slasher	1 h 50 min	English
Last Summer	July 9, 2021	Romantic drama	1 h 41 min	Turkish
A Classic Horror Story	July 14, 2021	Horror	1 h 35 min	Italian
A Perfect Fit	July 15, 2021	Romantic comedy / drama	1 h 52 min	Indonesian
My Amanda	July 15, 2021	Romance	1 h 29 min	Filipino
Deep	July 16, 2021	Science fiction	1 h 41 min	Thai
Fear Street Part 3: 1666	July 16, 2021	Supernatural horror	1 h 54 min	English
Blood Red Sky	July 23, 2021	Thriller	2 h 3 min	German
Bankrolled	July 23, 2021	Comedy	1 h 37 min	Spanish
Bartkowiak	July 28, 2021	Action	1 h 31 min	Polish
Resort to Love	July 29, 2021	Romantic comedy	1 h 41 min	English
The Last Mercenary	July 30, 2021	Action comedy	1 h 52 min	French
The Kissing Booth 3	August 11, 2021	Comedy drama	1 h 53 min	English
Beckett	August 13, 2021	Action thriller	1 h 50 min	English
Black Island	August 18, 2021	Thriller	1 h 44 min	German
The Secret Diary of an Exchange Student	August 18, 2021	Romantic comedy	1 h 36 min	Portuguese
Sweet Girl	August 20, 2021	Action	1 h 50 min	English
The Loud House Movie	August 20, 2021	Animation comedy	1 h 27 min	English
The Witcher: Nightmare of the Wolf	August 23, 2021	Animated dark fantasy	1 h 23 min	English
He's All That	August 27, 2021	Teen romantic comedy	1 h 31 min	English
Afterlife of the Party	September 2, 2021	Comedy	1 h 49 min	English
JJ+E	September 8, 2021	Romance	1 h 31 min	Swedish
Kate	September 10, 2021	Action thriller	1 h 46 min	English
Prey	September 10, 2021	Thriller	1 h 27 min	German
Nightbooks	September 15, 2021	Fantasy/horror	1 h 40 min	English
Ankahi Kahaniya	September 17, 2021	Anthology film	1 h 50 min	Hindi
Confessions of an Invisible Girl	September 22, 2021	Drama	1 h 31 min	Portuguese
Intrusion	September 22, 2021	Thriller	1 h 33 min	English
The Starling	September 24, 2021	Comedy drama	1 h 44 min	English
Friendzone	September 29, 2021	Romantic comedy	1 h 28 min	French
No One Gets Out Alive	September 29, 2021	Horror	1 h 25 min	English
Sounds Like Love	September 29, 2021	Romantic comedy	1 h 50 min	Spanish
Diana: The Musical	October 1, 2021	Musical	1 h 57 min	English
Forever Rich	October 1, 2021	Thriller	1 h 30 min	Dutch
Swallow	October 1, 2021	Drama	2 h 8 min	English
The Guilty	October 1, 2021	Thriller	1 h 31 min	English
There's Someone Inside Your House	October 6, 2021	Slasher	1 h 36 min	English
Grudge	October 8, 2021	Thriller	1 h 46 min	Turkish
My Brother, My Sister	October 8, 2021	Drama	1 h 50 min	Italian
Bright: Samurai Soul	October 12, 2021	Anime/fantasy	1 h 20 min	Japanese
Fever Dream	October 13, 2021	Drama	1 h 33 min	Spanish
Operation Hyacinth	October 13, 2021	Drama	1 h 52 min	Polish
A World Without	October 14, 2021	Science fiction / teen drama	1 h 47 min	Indonesian
The Four of Us	October 15, 2021	Comedy	1 h 28 min	German
Night Teeth	October 20, 2021	Thriller	1 h 48 min	English
Stuck Together	October 20, 2021	Comedy	2 h 6 min	French
Little Big Mouth	October 22, 2021	Romantic comedy	1 h 34 min	English
Hypnotic	October 27, 2021	Thriller	1 h 29 min	English
Nobody Sleeps in the Woods Tonight Part 2	October 27, 2021	Horror	1 h 37 min	Polish
Army of Thieves	October 29, 2021	Romantic comedy / heist	2 h 9 min	English
The Harder They Fall	November 3, 2021	Western	2 h 19 min	English
Love Hard	November 5, 2021	Romantic comedy	1 h 46 min	English
Meenakshi Sundareshwar	November 5, 2021	Romantic comedy	2 h 21 min	Hindi
We Couldn't Become Adults	November 5, 2021	Drama	2 h 4 min	Japanese
Yara	November 5, 2021	Drama	1 h 36 min	Italian
Father Christmas Is Back	November 7, 2021	Comedy	1 h 45 min	English
Happiness Ever After	November 10, 2021	Romantic drama	1 h 39 min	English
Passing	November 10, 2021	Drama	1 h 39 min	English
7 Prisoners	November 11, 2021	Drama	1 h 34 min	Portuguese
Red Notice	November 12, 2021	Action comedy	1 h 57 min	English
Just Short of Perfect	November 18, 2021	Romantic comedy	1 h 34 min	Portuguese
The Princess Switch 3: Romancing the Star	November 18, 2021	Romantic comedy	1 h 46 min	English
Dhamaka	November 19, 2021	Action thriller	1 h 44 min	Hindi
Love Me Instead	November 19, 2021	Drama	2 h 4 min	Turkish
Tick, Tick... Boom!	November 19, 2021	Musical	1 h 55 min	English
Bruised	November 24, 2021	Drama	2 h 12 min	English
A Castle for Christmas	November 26, 2021	Romantic comedy	1 h 39 min	English
The Power of the Dog	December 1, 2021	Drama	2 h 8 min	English
Single All the Way	December 2, 2021	Holiday romantic comedy	1 h 41 min	English
The Whole Truth	December 2, 2021	Horror	2 h 5 min	Thai
Mixtape	December 3, 2021	Coming-of-age comedy drama	1 h 37 min	English
David and the Elves	December 6, 2021	Fantasy	1 h 46 min	Polish
The Claus Family 2	December 7, 2021	Fantasy	1 h 37 min	Dutch
Asakusa Kid	December 9, 2021	Drama	2 h 3 min	Japanese
Anonymously Yours	December 10, 2021	Romantic comedy	1 h 41 min	Spanish
Back to the Outback	December 10, 2021	CGI animation comedy	1 h 35 min	English
The Unforgivable	December 10, 2021	Drama	1 h 54 min	English
The Hand of God	December 15, 2021	Drama	2 h 10 min	Italian
A California Christmas: City Lights	December 16, 2021	Romantic comedy	1 h 30 min	English
A Naija Christmas	December 16, 2021	Romantic comedy	2 h 1 min	English
Grumpy Christmas	December 21, 2021	Comedy	1 h 27 min	Spanish
1000 Miles from Christmas	December 24, 2021	Christmas film	1 h 42 min	Spanish
Don't Look Up	December 24, 2021	Science fiction comedy	2 h 18 min	English
Minnal Murali	December 24, 2021	Superhero	2 h 39 min	Malayalam
Lulli	December 26, 2021	Comedy	1 h 30 min	Portuguese

== Documentaries ==
Title	Release date	Runtime	Language
The Minimalists: Less Is Now	January 1, 2021	53 min	English
Tony Parker: The Final Shot	January 6, 2021	1 h 38 min	French
Crack: Cocaine, Corruption & Conspiracy	January 11, 2021	1 h 29 min	English
What Would Sophia Loren Do?	January 15, 2021	32 min	English
Strip Down, Rise Up	February 5, 2021	1 h 52 min	English
Pelé	February 23, 2021	1 h 48 min	Portuguese
Biggie: I Got a Story to Tell	March 1, 2021	1 h 37 min	English
Operation Varsity Blues: The College Admissions Scandal	March 17, 2021	1 h 39 min	English
Seaspiracy	March 24, 2021	1 h 29 min	English
Dolly Parton: A MusiCares Tribute	April 7, 2021	55 min	English
Why Did You Kill Me?	April 14, 2021	1 h 23 min	English
Chadwick Boseman: Portrait of an Artist	April 17, 2021	21 min	English
Searching for Sheela	April 22, 2021	58 min	English
Nail Bomber: Manhunt	May 26, 2021	1 h 12 min	English
Breaking Boundaries: The Science of Our Planet	June 4, 2021	1 h 13 min	English
Kitty Love: An Homage to Cats	June 5, 2021	1 h	Dutch
Murder by the Coast	June 23, 2021	1 h 28 min	Spanish
Sisters on Track	June 24, 2021	1 h 36 min	English
Audible	July 1, 2021	38 min	English
Private Network: Who Killed Manuel Buendía?	July 14, 2021	1 h 40 min	Spanish
Pray Away	August 3, 2021	1 h 41 min	English
Shiny_Flakes: The Teenage Drug Lord	August 3, 2021	1 h 36 min	German
Untold: Malice at the Palace	August 10, 2021	1 h 9 min	English
Untold: Deal with the Devil	August 17, 2021	1 h 17 min	English
Memories of a Murderer: The Nilsen Tapes	August 18, 2021	1 h 25 min	English
Untold: Caitlyn Jenner	August 24, 2021	1 h 9 min	English
Bob Ross: Happy Accidents, Betrayal & Greed	August 25, 2021	1 h 33 min	English
Untold: Crimes & Penalties	August 31, 2021	1 h 26 min	English
Untold: Breaking Point	September 7, 2021	1 h 19 min	English
Blood Brothers: Malcolm X & Muhammad Ali	September 9, 2021	1 h 36 min	English
The Women and the Murderer	September 9, 2021	1 h 32 min	French
Schumacher	September 15, 2021	1 h 52 min	English
My Heroes Were Cowboys	September 16, 2021	23 min	English
Britney vs Spears	September 28, 2021	1 h 33 min	English
Convergence: Courage in a Crisis	October 12, 2021	1 h 53 min	English
Making Malinche: A Documentary by Nacho Cano	October 12, 2021	1 h 29 min	Spanish
Found	October 20, 2021	1 h 38 min	English
Flip a Coin – One OK Rock Documentary	October 21, 2021	1 h 45 min	Japanese
Lords of Scam	November 3, 2021	1 h 45 min	French
A Cop Movie	November 5, 2021	1 h 47 min	Spanish
Procession	November 19, 2021	1 h 58 min	English
Angèle	November 26, 2021	1 h 24 min	French
14 Peaks: Nothing Is Impossible	November 29, 2021	1 h 41 min	English
Lead Me Home	November 30, 2021	40 min	English
137 Shots	December 15, 2021	1 h 45 min	English
Puff: Wonders of the Reef	December 16, 2021	1 h 2 min	English

== Specials ==
These programs are one-time original events or supplementary content related to original films.

Title	Release date	Genre	Runtime	Language
To All the Boys: Always and Forever – The Afterparty	February 13, 2021	Aftershow	36 min	English
Creating an Army of the Dead	May 22, 2021	Making-of	28 min	English
Emicida: AmarElo – Live in São Paulo	July 15, 2021	Concert	1 h 39 min	Portuguese
Monster Hunter: Legends of the Guild	August 12, 2021	Animated fantasy	58 min	English
Attack of the Hollywood Clichés!	September 28, 2021	Comedy	58 min	English
Escape the Undertaker	October 5, 2021	Interactive horror	31 min	English
Sex: Unzipped	October 26, 2021	Comedy	59 min	English
Robin Robin	November 24, 2021	Stop motion / musical	32 min	English
Death to 2021	December 27, 2021	Comedy	1 h	English
