= List of awards and nominations received by Chadwick Boseman =

Chadwick Boseman awards and nominations
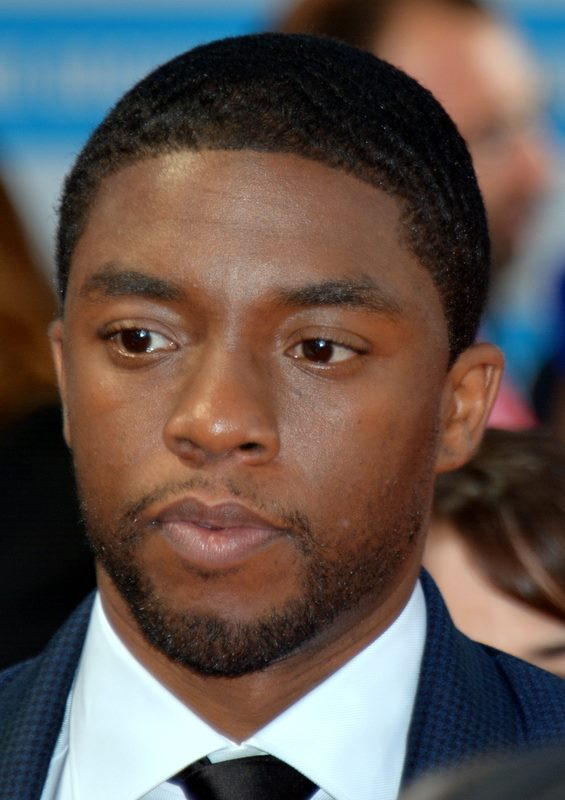
- Boseman at the 2014 Deauville American Film Festival
Awards and nominations
Award	Wins	Nominations
Academy Awards	0	1
British Academy Film Awards	0	1
Critics' Choice Movie Awards	1	4
Golden Globe Awards	1	1
Primetime Emmy Awards	1	1
Screen Actors Guild Awards	2	5

Totals (Note: Certain award groups do not simply award one winner. They acknowledge several different recipients, have runners-up, and have third place. Since this is a specific recognition and is different from losing an award, runner-up mentions are considered wins in this award tally. For simplification and to avoid errors, each award in this list has been presumed to have had a prior nomination.)
- Wins: 42
- Nominations: 110

American actor and playwright Chadwick Boseman (1976–2020) won many awards for his work and career.

Boseman achieved international fame with his portrayal of T'Challa in the superhero film Black Panther (2018) and other Marvel Cinematic Universe films, for which he received numerous accolades, including a BET Award, two MTV Movie & TV Awards, a Screen Actors Guild Award shared with the cast, and a posthumous Primetime Emmy Award. He also portrayed real life figures, such as Jackie Robinson in 42 (2013), James Brown in Get On Up (2014), and Thurgood Marshall in Marshall (2017), all of which were nominated at the NAACP Image Awards.

Boseman died of colon cancer on August 28, 2020. His two final films were Spike Lee's Da 5 Bloods and George C. Wolfe's Ma Rainey's Black Bottom. For the latter, he was nominated in the Best Actor category at the Academy Awards, BAFTA Awards, Critics' Choice Movie Awards, Golden Globe Awards, and Screen Actors Guild Awards, becoming the first black performer to ever be nominated posthumously for an Oscar. Boseman is also the actor with most nominations in a single ceremony at the Screen Actors Guild Awards, thanks to his work in Da 5 Bloods and Ma Rainey's Black Bottom.

== Major awards ==
=== Academy Awards ===
Year	Category	Nominated work	Result	Ref.
2021	Best Actor	Ma Rainey's Black Bottom	Nominated	

=== British Academy Film Awards ===
Year	Category	Nominated work	Result	Ref.
2021	Best Actor in a Leading Role	Ma Rainey's Black Bottom	Nominated	

=== Critics' Choice Movie Awards ===
Year	Category	Nominated work	Result	Ref.
2021	Best Actor	Ma Rainey's Black Bottom	Won	
2021	Best Acting Ensemble	Ma Rainey's Black Bottom	Nominated	
2021	Best Acting Ensemble	Da 5 Bloods	Nominated	
2021	Best Supporting Actor	Da 5 Bloods	Nominated	

=== Golden Globe Awards ===
Year	Category	Nominated work	Result	Ref.
2021	Best Actor in a Motion Picture – Drama	Ma Rainey's Black Bottom	Won	

=== Primetime Emmy Awards ===
Year	Category	Nominated work	Result	Ref.
2022	Outstanding Character Voice-Over Performance	What If...? (Episode: "What If... T'Challa Became a Star-Lord?")	Won	

=== Screen Actors Guild Awards ===
Year	Category	Nominated work	Result	Ref.
2019	Outstanding Performance by a Cast in a Motion Picture	Black Panther	Won	
2021	Outstanding Performance by a Male Actor in a Leading Role	Ma Rainey's Black Bottom	Won	
2021	Outstanding Performance by a Cast in a Motion Picture	Ma Rainey's Black Bottom	Nominated	
2021	Outstanding Performance by a Cast in a Motion Picture	Da 5 Bloods	Nominated	
2021	Outstanding Performance by a Male Actor in a Supporting Role	Da 5 Bloods	Nominated	

== Film juried awards ==
=== AACTA Awards ===
Year	Category	Nominated work	Result	Ref.
2020	Best International Actor	Ma Rainey's Black Bottom	Won	
2020	Best International Supporting Actor	Da 5 Bloods	Nominated	

=== Gotham Independent Film Awards ===
Year	Category	Nominated work	Result	Ref.
2020	Best Actor	Ma Rainey's Black Bottom	Nominated	
2020	Actor Tribute	Himself	Won	

=== Independent Spirit Awards ===
Year	Category	Nominated work	Result	Ref.
2020	Best Male Lead	Ma Rainey's Black Bottom	Nominated	

=== National Board of Review ===
Year	Category	Nominated work	Result	Ref.
2020	Best Ensemble Cast	Da 5 Bloods	Won	
2020	NBR Icon Award	Himself	Won	

=== Satellite Awards ===
Year	Category	Nominated work	Result	Ref.
2020	Best Actor – Motion Picture Drama	Ma Rainey's Black Bottom	Nominated	
2020	Best Supporting Actor – Motion Picture	Da 5 Bloods	Won	

=== Saturn Awards ===
Year	Category	Nominated work	Result	Ref.
2017	Best Supporting Actor	Captain America: Civil War	Nominated	
2018	Best Actor	Black Panther	Nominated	

== Film critics awards ==
=== African-American Film Critics Association ===
Year	Category	Nominated work	Result	Ref.
2020	Best Actor	Ma Rainey's Black Bottom	Won	

=== Alliance of Women Film Journalists ===
Year	Category	Nominated work	Result	Ref.
2020	Best Actor	Ma Rainey's Black Bottom	Won	

=== Boston Society of Film Critics ===
Year	Category	Nominated work	Result	Ref.
2020	Best Ensemble Cast	Ma Rainey's Black Bottom	Won	

=== Chicago Film Critics Association ===
Year	Category	Nominated work	Result	Ref.
2013	Most Promising Performer	42	Nominated	
2020	Best Actor	Ma Rainey's Black Bottom	Won	
2020	Best Supporting Actor	Da 5 Bloods	Nominated	

=== Dallas–Fort Worth Film Critics Association ===
Year	Category	Nominated work	Result	Ref.
2020	Best Actor	Ma Rainey's Black Bottom	Won	

=== Detroit Film Critics Society ===
Year	Category	Nominated work	Result	Ref.
2020	Best Actor	Ma Rainey's Black Bottom	Nominated	
2020	Best Ensemble	Ma Rainey's Black Bottom	Nominated	
2020	Best Ensemble	Da 5 Bloods	Nominated	

=== Dorian Awards ===
Year	Category	Nominated work	Result	Ref.
2020	Best Film Performance — Actor	Ma Rainey's Black Bottom	Won	
2020	Best Film Performance — Supporting Actor	Da 5 Bloods	Nominated	
2020	Wilde Artist Award	Himself	Nominated	

=== Dublin Film Critics Circle ===
Year	Category	Nominated work	Result	Ref.
2014	Best Actor	Get on Up	Nominated	

=== Florida Film Critics Circle ===
Year	Category	Nominated work	Result	Ref.
2020	Best Actor	Ma Rainey's Black Bottom	Nominated	
2020	Best Ensemble	Ma Rainey's Black Bottom	Nominated	
2020	Best Supporting Actor	Da 5 Bloods	Nominated	

=== Georgia Film Critics Association ===
Year	Category	Nominated work	Result	Ref.
2020	Best Actor	Ma Rainey's Black Bottom	Nominated	
2020	Best Ensemble	Ma Rainey's Black Bottom	Nominated	

=== Hollywood Critics Association ===
Year	Category	Nominated work	Result	Ref.
2021	Best Actor	Ma Rainey's Black Bottom	Nominated	
2021	Best Cast Ensemble	Ma Rainey's Black Bottom	Nominated	
2021	Best Supporting Actor	Da 5 Bloods	Nominated	
2021	Best Cast Ensemble	Da 5 Bloods	Won	

=== Houston Film Critics Society Awards ===
Year	Category	Nominated work	Result	Ref.
2020	Best Actor	Ma Rainey's Black Bottom	Nominated	
2020	Best Supporting Actor	Da 5 Bloods	Nominated	

=== London Film Critics' Circle ===
Year	Category	Nominated work	Result	Ref.
2020	Actor of the Year	Ma Rainey's Black Bottom	Won	
2020	Supporting Actor of the Year	Da 5 Bloods	Nominated	

=== Los Angeles Film Critics Association ===
Year	Category	Nominated work	Result	Ref.
2020	Best Actor	Ma Rainey's Black Bottom	Won	

=== National Society of Film Critics ===
Year	Category	Nominated work	Result	Ref.
2020	Best Actor	Ma Rainey's Black Bottom	Runner-up	
2020	Best Supporting Actor	Da 5 Bloods	3rd Place	

=== New York Film Critics Circle ===
Year	Category	Nominated work	Result	Ref.
2020	Best Supporting Actor	Da 5 Bloods	Won	

=== Online Film Critics Society ===
Year	Category	Nominated work	Result	Ref.
2020	Best Actor	Ma Rainey's Black Bottom	Nominated	
2020	Best Supporting Actor	Da 5 Bloods	Nominated	

=== San Diego Film Critics Society ===
Year	Category	Nominated work	Result	Ref.
2020	Best Actor	Ma Rainey's Black Bottom	Nominated	
2020	Best Ensemble	Da 5 Bloods	Nominated	

=== San Francisco Bay Area Film Critics Circle ===
Year	Category	Nominated work	Result	Ref.
2020	Best Actor	Ma Rainey's Black Bottom	Won	
2020	Best Supporting Actor	Da 5 Bloods	Nominated	

=== Seattle Film Critics Society ===
Year	Category	Nominated work	Result	Ref.
2020	Best Actor in a Leading Role	Ma Rainey's Black Bottom	Nominated	

=== St. Louis Gateway Film Critics Association ===
Year	Category	Nominated work	Result	Ref.
2020	Best Actor	Ma Rainey's Black Bottom	Won	

=== Toronto Film Critics Association ===
Year	Category	Nominated work	Result	Ref.
2020	Best Actor	Ma Rainey's Black Bottom	Runner-up	

=== Vancouver Film Critics Circle ===
Year	Category	Nominated work	Result	Ref.
2020	Best Actor	Ma Rainey's Black Bottom	Won	

=== Washington D.C. Area Film Critics Association ===
Year	Category	Nominated work	Result	Ref.
2021	Best Actor	Ma Rainey's Black Bottom	Won	
2021	Best Acting Ensemble	Da 5 Bloods	Nominated	
2021	Best Acting Ensemble	Ma Rainey's Black Bottom	Nominated	

== Film festival awards ==
=== American Black Film Festival ===
Year	Category	Nominated work	Result	Ref.
2014	Most Promising Performer	42	Nominated	

=== Hollywood Black Film Festival ===
Year	Category	Nominated work	Result	Ref.
2008	Best Short Film	Blood Over a Broken Pawn	Won	

=== Santa Barbara International Film Festival ===
Year	Category	Nominated work	Result	Ref.
2015	Virtuoso Award	Get on Up	Won	

== Theatre awards ==
=== AUDELCO Awards ===
Year	Category	Nominated work	Result	Ref.
2002	Best Supporting Actor in a Drama	Urban Transitions	Won	

=== Joseph Jefferson Awards ===
Year	Category	Nominated work	Result	Ref.
2006	Best New Play	Deep Azure	Nominated	

== Miscellaneous awards ==
=== BET Awards ===
Year	Category	Nominated work	Result	Ref.
2018	Best Actor	Marshall and Black Panther (Note: Sterling K. Brown, Michael B. Jordan and Daniel Kaluuya from Black Panther were also nominated.)	Won	
2019	Best Actor	Avengers: Infinity War and Avengers: Endgame	Nominated	
2021	Best Actor	Da 5 Bloods and Ma Rainey's Black Bottom	Won	

=== Black Reel Awards ===
Year	Category	Nominated work	Result	Ref.
2014	Outstanding Breakthrough Performance, Male	42	Nominated	
2015	Outstanding Actor	Get on Up	Nominated	
2018	Outstanding Actor	Marshall	Nominated	
2019	Outstanding Actor	Black Panther	Won	
2021	Outstanding Actor	Ma Rainey's Black Bottom	Won	
2021	Outstanding Supporting Actor	Da 5 Bloods	Nominated	

=== MTV Movie & TV Awards ===
Year	Category	Nominated work	Result	Ref.
2018	Best Performance in a Movie	Black Panther	Won	
2018	Best Hero	Black Panther	Won	
2018	Best Fight	Black Panther (Black Panther vs M'Baku; with Winston Duke)	Nominated	
2018	Best On-Screen Team	Black Panther (with Lupita Nyong'o, Letitia Wright and Danai Gurira)	Nominated	
2020	The G.O.A.T. – Hero for the Ages	Himself	Won	
2021	Best Performance in a Movie	Ma Rainey's Black Bottom	Won	

=== NAACP Image Awards ===
Year	Category	Nominated work	Result	Ref.
2013	Outstanding Actor in a Motion Picture	42	Nominated	
2014	Outstanding Actor in a Motion Picture	Get on Up	Nominated	
2016	Outstanding Supporting Actor in a Motion Picture	Captain America: Civil War	Nominated	
2018	Outstanding Actor in a Motion Picture	Marshall	Nominated	
2019	Outstanding Actor in a Motion Picture	Black Panther	Won	
2019	Outstanding Ensemble Cast in a Motion Picture	Black Panther	Won	
2019	Entertainer of the Year	Himself	Nominated	
2020	Outstanding Actor in a Motion Picture	21 Bridges	Nominated	
2021	Outstanding Actor in a Motion Picture	Ma Rainey's Black Bottom	Won	
2021	Outstanding Ensemble Cast in a Motion Picture	Ma Rainey's Black Bottom	Won	
2021	Outstanding Supporting Actor in a Motion Picture	Da 5 Bloods	Won	
2021	Outstanding Ensemble Cast in a Motion Picture	Da 5 Bloods	Nominated	

=== Nickelodeon Kids' Choice Awards ===
Year	Category	Nominated work	Result	Ref.
2017	#SQUAD	Captain America: Civil War (cast)	Nominated	
2019	Favorite Movie Actor	Black Panther	Nominated	
2019	Favorite Superhero	Black Panther	Nominated	

=== People's Choice Awards ===
Year	Category	Nominated work	Result	Ref.
2018	Male Movie Star of the Year	Black Panther	Won	
2018	Action Movie Star of the Year	Black Panther	Nominated	

=== Teen Choice Awards ===
Year	Category	Nominated work	Result	Ref.
2016	Choice Movie: Chemistry	Captain America: Civil War (with Robert Downey Jr., Scarlett Johansson, Don Cheadle, and Paul Bettany) (Note: Chris Evans, Sebastian Stan, Anthony Mackie, Elizabeth Olsen, and Jeremy Renner were nominated separately for the same movie. Neither group won.)	Nominated	
2016	Choice Movie: Scene Stealer	Captain America: Civil War (Note: Tom Holland was nominated separately for the same movie. Neither won.)	Nominated	
2018	Choice Sci-Fi Movie Actor	Black Panther	Nominated	
2018	Choice Liplock	Black Panther (with Lupita Nyong'o)	Nominated	
2018	Choice Movie Ship	Black Panther (with Lupita Nyong'o)	Nominated	
