= Bartosz Bielenia =

Polish actor (born 1992)

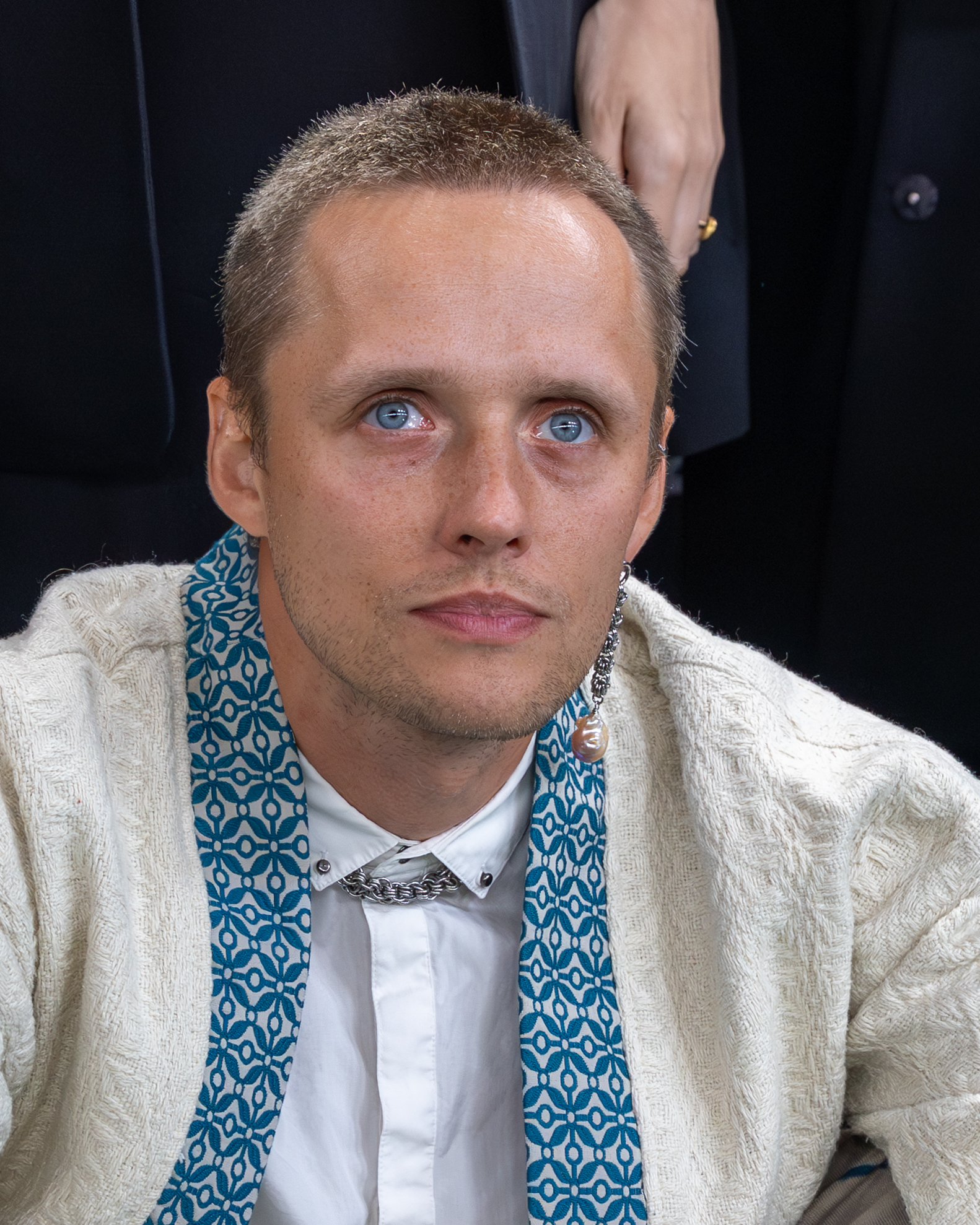
- Bartosz Bielenia on the Green Carpet at the 2025 Zurich Film Festival.
- Born: Bartosz Bielenia; 15 May 1992 (age 34); Białystok, Poland
- Education: AST National Academy of Theatre Arts in Kraków
- Occupation: Actor
- Years active: 2013–present

Bartosz Bielenia (born 15 May 1992) is a Polish film and stage actor.

== Education ==
In 2016, Bielenia graduated from AST National Academy of Theatre Arts in Kraków.

== Career ==
He made his debut in 1999 at the Aleksander Wegierko Dramatic Theatre in Białystok as the title character in the play The Little Prince.

From 2013 he played in Bagatela Theatre in Kraków, where he debuted with the role of the consumptive seventeen-year-old Ippolit Terentyev in Dostoyevsky's The Idiot. In the years 2014–2017 he performed at the Helena Modrzejewska National Old Theatre in Kraków. Since 2018 he has been performing in the New Theatre in Warsaw.

In 2019, Bielenia took on the starring role in Corpus Christi, earning wide acclaim for his performance. He received a Polish Academy Award for Best Actor as well as Best Actor awards at festivals including the El Gouna Film Festival, the Chicago International Film Festival and the Stockholm International Film Festival. In December, he was awarded the Zbigniew Cybulski Award. In 2020, he received the Shooting Star Award for best young European actor, and the European Film Award for best actor.

In 2021, he played Sebastian in the Netflix crime-thriller Prime Time.

== Filmography ==
=== Film ===
Year	Title	Role	Ref.
2015	Disco Polo	Member of Band Funny Games	
2015	The Time of a Young Man About To Kill	Young Man	
2016	Na granicy	Janek	
2018	Clergy	Toady	
2019	Corpus Christi	Daniel	
2020	25 Years of Innocence	Krzysiek Pyzior	
2021	Prime Time	Sebastian	
2023	Scarborn	Ignac Sikora	
2025	Wolves	Wiktor	

== Awards ==
- 2016: Międzynarodowy Festiwal Kina Niezależnego „Off Camera” in Krakowie – Special Mention for an actor in the Polish Feature Film Competition for the film Na granicy
- 2016: Koszaliński Festiwal Debiutów Filmowych „Młodzi i Film” – nagroda za odkrycie aktorskie za „wyjątkową obecność w filmie, bogate środki wyrazu. Za moc i wiarygodność” za film Na granicy
- 2019: Zbigniew Cybulski Award
- 2020: Forbes 30 under 30 recognition
- 2020: Shooting Star Award
