= Wolves (2025 film) =

2025 Swiss film

- Directed by: Jonas Ulrich
- Written by: Jonas Ulrich
- Produced by: Nicole Ulrich, Philipp Ritler, Jonas Ulrich
- Starring: Selma Kopp, Bartosz Bielenia, Fabian Künzli, Judith Hofmann, Thomas Ott, Lale Yavas
- Cinematography: Tobias Kubli
- Edited by: Jonas Ulrich
- Music by: Matteo Pagamici; Michael Künstle (score), Manuel Gagneux (original songs for WLVS)
- Release date: September 28, 2025 (Zurich Film Festival)
- Running time: 100 minutes (1h 40min)
- Country: Switzerland
- Languages: Swiss German, English

Wolves is a Swiss feature film, within the drama film genre, directed and written by Jonas Ulrich. It is set within the black metal scene, the drama feature constitutes Ulrich’s feature-length directorial debut. The leading ensemble includes the Swiss actress Selma Kopp and Polish actor Bartosz Bielenia

The film premiered in the Feature Film Competition of the 21st Zurich Film Festival on 28 September 2025.

== Plot ==
The narrative centres upon Luana (Selma Kopp), a young woman who immerses herself in the world of black metal. Amidst rebellion, friendship and the perennial search for self, she encounters Wiktor (Bartosz Bielenia), a charismatic musician and falls in love with him.

== Production ==
After winning the Pardino d’oro at the Locarno Film Festival in 2021 (with his short film People on Saturday), Ulrich started his first full-length project with Wolves.

For the purposes of the film, the band WLVS was created, with songs written by Manuel Gagneux and interpreted by the cast of the film, including lead singer Bartosz Bielenia, who had to undergo months of vocal coaching.

The film also features additional music and live performances by Amenra, Oathbreaker, Darkspace and Spirit Adrift.

== Cast ==
- Selma Kopp – Luana
- Bartosz Bielenia – Wiktor
- Fabian Künzli – Domi
- Judith Hofmann – Claudia
- Thomas Ott – Martin
- Anna Sauter-McDowell – Amélie
- Moritz Fabian – Jan
- Lale Yavaş – Silvia

== Release ==
The film’s world première took place on Sunday, the 28th of September 2025 at the Zurich Film Festival, accompanied by a live concert by WLVS at the Theatre Stadelhofen. After its world première at the Zurich Film Festival, Wolves was selected for the New Directors Competition of the 49th São Paulo International Film Festival (Mostra Internacional de Cinema em São Paulo), held from 16 to 30 October 2025.
