= Chadwick Boseman: Portrait of an Artist =

- Title card
- Directed by: Awol Erizku
- Produced by: Katie Kornfield; Jeff Vespa
- Starring: Chadwick Boseman; Viola Davis; Spike Lee
- Production companies: Netfilm Productions; Vespa Pictures
- Distributed by: Netflix
- Release date: April 17, 2021
- Running time: 21 minutes
- Country: United States
- Language: English

Chadwick Boseman: Portrait of an Artist is a 2021 Netflix special directed by Awol Erizku. It offers a look into the life and career of late actor Chadwick Boseman, which is portrayed through archival footage and interviews with co-stars Viola Davis and Spike Lee. The special premiered on April 17, 2021 and was available on Netflix for 30 days.
