= Chadwick Boseman =

American actor (1976–2020)

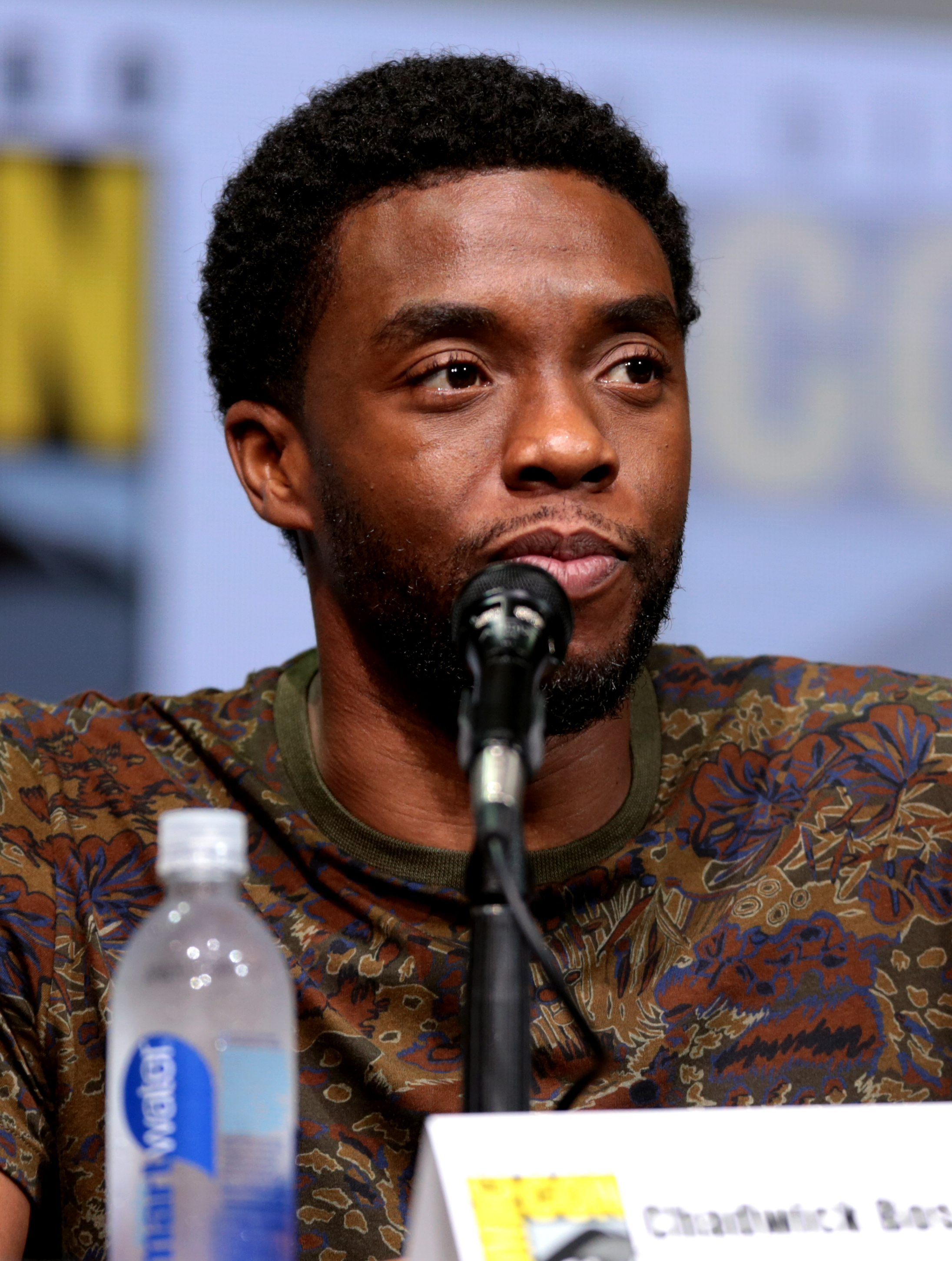
- Boseman at the 2017 San Diego Comic-Con
- Born: Chadwick Aaron Boseman; November 29, 1976; Anderson, South Carolina, US
- Died: August 28, 2020 (aged 43); Los Angeles, California, US
- Cause of death: Colon cancer
- Resting place: Anderson, South Carolina, US
- Education: Howard University (BFA)
- Occupations: Actor; playwright
- Years active: 1993–2020
- Spouse: Taylor Simone Ledward
- Awards: Full list

Chadwick Aaron Boseman (/ˈboʊzmən/; November 29, 1976 – August 28, 2020) was an American actor and playwright. Through his two-decade career, he appeared in a number of projects spanning both blockbuster and independent films, and received various accolades, including an Actor Award, a Golden Globe Award, and a Primetime Emmy Award, in addition to nominations for an Academy Award and a BAFTA Award.

Born in South Carolina, Boseman studied directing at Howard University and began his career in theatre. Boseman won a Drama League Directing Fellowship and an acting AUDELCO, along with receiving a Jeff Award nomination for his 2005 play Deep Azure. Transitioning to the screen, his first major role was as a series regular on the NBC drama Persons Unknown (2010) and he landed his breakthrough role as baseball player Jackie Robinson in 42 (2013). He continued to portray historical figures, starring as singer James Brown in Get on Up (2014) and as Thurgood Marshall in Marshall (2017).

Boseman achieved international fame for playing the Marvel Comics superhero T'Challa (Black Panther) in the Marvel Cinematic Universe (MCU) from 2016 to 2019. He appeared in four MCU films, including Black Panther (2018). As the first Black actor to headline an MCU film, he was also named in the 2018 Time 100. Boseman's final performance as the character in the Disney+ anthology series What If...? (2021) earned him a posthumous Primetime Emmy Award for Outstanding Character Voice-Over Performance.

In 2016, Boseman was diagnosed with colon cancer. He kept his condition private, continuing to act until his death from the illness in 2020. For his final film role, the drama Ma Rainey's Black Bottom (2020), he received the Golden Globe and Screen Actors Guild awards for Best Actor, along with a posthumous nomination for an Oscar in the same category.

== Life and career ==
=== Early years and education ===
Chadwick Aaron Boseman was born on November 29, 1976, in Anderson, South Carolina, where he grew up. His mother, Carolyn, was a nurse. His father, Leroy worked at a textile factory and managed an upholstery business. In his youth, Boseman practiced martial arts, and continued this training as an adult. As a child, he wanted to become an architect. According to Boseman, DNA testing indicated that some of his ancestors were Jola people from Guinea-Bissau, Krio people and Limba people from Sierra Leone, and Yoruba people from Nigeria.

Boseman graduated from T. L. Hanna High School in 1995, where he played on the basketball team. In his junior year, he wrote his first play, Crossroads, and staged it at the school after a classmate was shot and killed. He competed in Speech and Debate in the National Speech and Debate Association at T. L. Hanna. He placed eighth in Original Oratory at the 1995 National Tournament. He was recruited to play basketball at college but chose the arts instead, attending college at Howard University in Washington, D.C., and graduating in 2000 with a Bachelor of Fine Arts in directing. While at Howard, he worked in an African American–oriented bookstore near the university, which friend Vanessa German said was important and inspirational to him; he drew on his experience there for his play Hieroglyphic Graffiti.

His teachers at Howard included Al Freeman Jr. and Phylicia Rashad, who became a mentor. Rashad helped raise funds, notably from her friend and prominent actor Denzel Washington, so that Boseman and other classmates could attend the Oxford Summer Program of the British American Drama Academy at Balliol College, Oxford, in England, to which they had been accepted. Boseman wanted to write and direct, and initially began studying acting to learn how to relate to actors. He attended the program in 1998, and he developed an appreciation for the playwriting of William Shakespeare; additionally, he studied the works of various dramatists, including Samuel Beckett and Harold Pinter. He also traveled to Africa for the first time while at college, working in Ghana with his professor Mike Malone "to preserve and celebrate rituals with performances on a proscenium stage"; he said it was "one of the most significant learning experiences of [his] life". After he returned to the U.S., he took additional course work in film studies, graduating from New York City's Digital Film Academy.

=== 2000–2007: Theater, Deep Azure, and early television ===
Boseman lived in Brooklyn, New York City, at the start of his career. In 2000, he was named a Drama League Directing Fellow. He directed productions including George C. Wolfe's The Colored Museum (Wolfe would later direct Boseman in his final role) and a staging of Amiri Baraka's Dutchman. He worked as the drama instructor in the Schomburg Junior Scholars Program, housed at the Schomburg Center for Research in Black Culture in Harlem between 2002 and 2009.

He rose to prominence as a playwright and stage actor in 2002, performing in multiple productions and winning an AUDELCO award in 2002 for his part in Ron Milner's Urban Transitions. As a member of the National Shakespeare Company of New York, he played Romeo in Romeo and Juliet and Malcolm in Macbeth. He directed and wrote plays as part of the Hip-hop theater movement; his works included Rhyme Deferred (co-written with Howard classmate Kamilah Forbes), in which he also performed, and Hieroglyphic Graffiti. Rhyme Deferred was commissioned for a national tour, as well as featuring in The Fire This Time anthology of works, while Hieroglyphic Graffiti was produced at a variety of locations, including the National Black Theatre Festival in 2001. Combining modern African-American culture and Egyptian deities, it is set in Washington, D.C., and was picked up by the New York Hip-Hop Theatre Festival and Tennessee State University's summer stock theatre program in 2002. It was also the Kuntu Repertory Theatre's 2002–03 season launch production. At the 2002 Hip-Hop Theatre Festival, Boseman also gave a one-man show called "Red Clay and Carved Concrete".

In 2003, Boseman was cast in his first television role, an episode of Third Watch, and began playing Reggie Montgomery in the daytime soap opera All My Children. He was fired from All My Children after voicing concerns to producers about racist stereotypes in the script; the role was subsequently re-cast, with Boseman's future Black Panther co-star Michael B. Jordan taking the part. Boseman had wanted to work around the stereotypes of the character, feeling that being in a soap opera would give him more room for improvisation as the writers often do not initially plan a full story; his (then-future) agent said that when Boseman was given the second script and learned that his character's parents were a drug addict and an absent father, Boseman confronted the creators. He reflected on the experience in his 2018 commencement address to Howard University, saying that it "seemed to be wrapped up in assumptions about us as black folks [and he] would have to make something out of nothing." His other early television work included episodes of the series Law & Order, Cold Case, CSI: NY, and ER.

Boseman's best-known play, Deep Azure, was commissioned in 2004 by the Congo Square Theatre Company in Chicago. It was nominated for a 2006 Jeff Award for Best New Work. Boseman said at the time that Deep Azure was "a fusion and progression of [his] previous plays", which he did not feel fit wholly in the Hip Hop theater genre. The play – about police brutality, a daring subject in 2004, and largely delivered in rhyme – was workshopped at the Apollo Theater in New York. Drama critic Chris Jones in the Chicago Tribune highly praised the work. In 2008, Boseman turned Deep Azure into a screenplay. Michael Greene, who would become his agent, picked it up and contacted Boseman when Tessa Thompson and Omari Hardwick expressed an interest in playing the lead roles, prompting Boseman's move to Los Angeles. He also directed, wrote, and produced the short film Blood Over a Broken Pawn in 2007, which was honored at the 2008 Hollywood Black Film Festival.

=== 2008–2015: Breakthrough with 42 and Get on Up ===
In 2008, Boseman moved to Los Angeles to pursue his film and acting career. He was cast in a recurring role on the television series Lincoln Heights as Nathaniel Ray Taylor, an army veteran with PTSD who was later revealed to be the son of the main character before re-enlisting. He also appeared in his first feature film in 2008, The Express: The Ernie Davis Story, as running back Floyd Little. He landed his first regular role in the 2010 television series Persons Unknown as the Marine Graham McNair. The show received mediocre reviews that felt the characters were all archetypes with little development. In July 2013, Boseman's second short film as director, Heaven, premiered at the HollyShorts Film Festival.

Boseman reflects on his role as Jackie Robinson in the biopic 42 in the State Dining Room, April 2013.

Boseman's breakthrough role came in 2013 with the film 42, in which he portrayed the lead role of baseball legend Jackie Robinson. Boseman had been directing an off-Broadway play in the East Village when he auditioned for the role, and was considering giving up acting to pursue directing full-time. About twenty-five other actors had been seriously considered for the role, but director Brian Helgeland liked Boseman's bravery in choosing to read the most difficult scene, in which Robinson goes down a stadium tunnel and breaks a bat in anger, and cast him after he had auditioned twice. Part of the audition process involved playing baseball; Boseman had been involved with Little League as a child but was primarily a basketball player growing up, saying that in this part the casting directors likely noticed his athleticism rather than specifically baseball skills. Robinson's widow, Rachel Robinson, commented that Boseman's performance was like seeing her husband again. To replicate Robinson's mannerisms, Boseman trained for five months with professional baseball coaches who "would tape [his] practices every few weeks, and they would basically split-screen [his technique] with [Robinson's]" to allow him to compare. After having portrayed football player Little in The Express, Boseman was encouraged by stunt coordinator Allan Graf to approach running bases in the same way, as Robinson had also been a college football player. Upon taking the role, Boseman first spoke with Rachel Robinson, which he said was of great help in discovering the character. The same year, Boseman also starred in the independent film The Kill Hole, which was released in theaters a few weeks before 42.

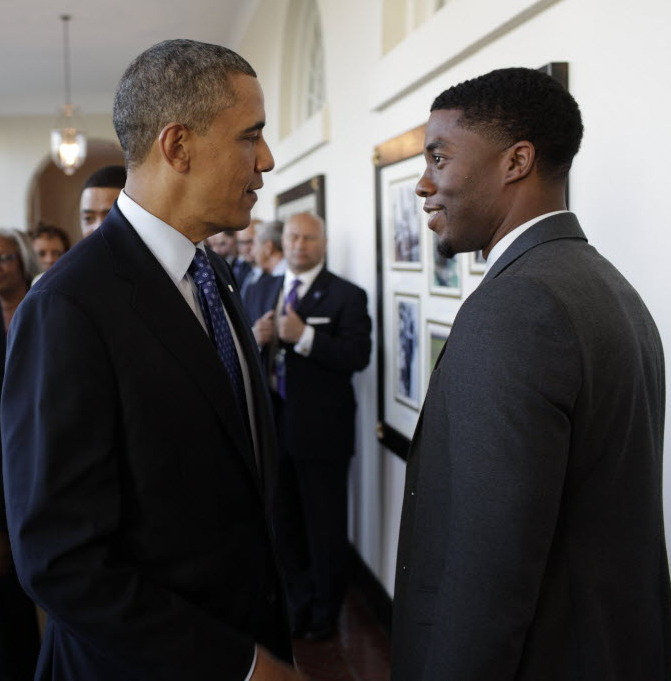
President Barack Obama greets Boseman in the East Room, April 2013.

Critics, even those who viewed the film negatively, felt that Boseman's being a relatively unknown actor was a benefit when playing an icon and an athlete; Mick LaSalle of San Francisco Chronicle wrote that "as [...] played by Chadwick Boseman, Robinson is a hero we can recognize", and Mary Pols for Time said that "Boseman is not a hugely close physical match to Robinson, except for perhaps in the power he conveys, but he's a great choice to play the ball player". The Guardian's Mike McCahill noted that "Boseman hits his key scenes out of the park", but felt the film would not interest people who are not baseball fans, with Dana Stevens of Slate suggesting that the film made black history "squeaky-clean" and did both Robinson and Boseman's performance as him a disservice.

In 2014, Boseman starred in another sporting film, Draft Day, as fictional football player Vontae Mack. He had workshopped the Tupac Shakur jukebox musical Holler If Ya Hear Me in 2013, but did not continue to Broadway with it in order to take the role of James Brown in 2014's Get on Up. As Brown, Boseman did some singing and all of his own dancing, working with choreographer Aakomon Jones for five to eight hours a day over two months in preparation. Producer Mick Jagger also directed him on interacting with audiences when performing live music. He had not wanted to take a role in another biopic so soon after playing an icon in Robinson, saying he "wasn't looking to do it again for another 15, 20 years", but was sought out as director Tate Taylor's only choice. Co-star Dan Aykroyd, who had known Brown, praised Boseman's performance, saying that it was neither replication nor impression and that he "did not have to squint sitting across from [Boseman] to imagine that [he] was talking to [Brown]". Boseman also stayed in character between filming on set; Taylor said this was not a method acting approach, and more a necessity due to Boseman's holding his vocal cords unnaturally to imitate Brown's southern drawl.

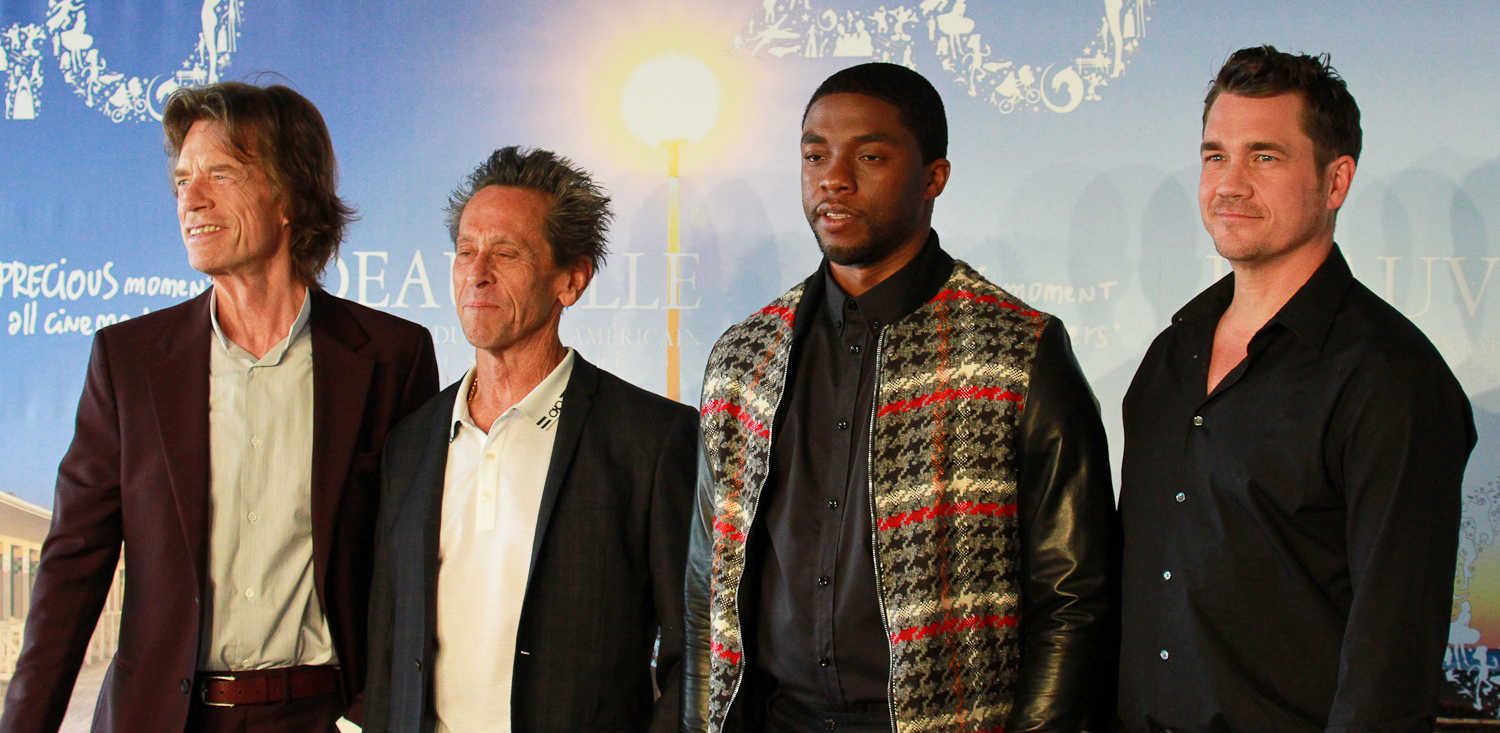
Boseman and others involved in Get on Up at the 2014 Deauville American Film Festival

His performance was praised as the highlight of a generally well received movie, with the Rotten Tomatoes critical consensus reading: "With an unforgettable Chadwick Boseman in the starring role, Get On Up offers the Godfather of Soul a fittingly dynamic homage." Among the critics was Time's Richard Corliss (hyperbolically) saying that Boseman "deserves a Pulitzer, a Nobel and instant election to the Rock and Roll Hall of Fame." Eulogizing Boseman, Donald Clarke of The Irish Times said that "Get on Up tested every weapon in the actor's arsenal [and his] performance confirmed that, like a star from Hollywood's golden age, Chadwick Boseman could do it all and do it all with style."

Boseman had sold a thriller screenplay to Universal Pictures in 2014, which he continued to collaborate on with creative partner Logan Coles and planned to star in, and told The Guardian that he still wanted to be a director but would explore his acting career first, adding that "maybe it'll be easier if you're a successful actor". In 2016, he starred as Thoth, a deity from Egyptian mythology, in Gods of Egypt. Boseman was one of the few actors of color featured in the film, which had drawn criticism for using a predominantly white cast to portray Egyptian characters. Agreeing with the criticism, Boseman said this had motivated him to accept the role, to ensure one of the film's African characters would be played by someone of African descent. Boseman's own casting was criticized for falling under the "Magical Negro" stereotype. The Independent reported that Boseman shook his head while telling GQ in an interview that "people don't make $140 million movies starring black and brown people". It was his first largely CGI film, and he expressed that he preferred acting alongside people than with blue screens and prop stand-ins. The film was heavily criticized; Jordan Hoffman for The Guardian said that it lacks story or interesting characters, but "Boseman makes for nice comic relief as the witty Thoth", with Will Leitch of The New Republic saying that his then-upcoming Marvel Studios role may have to work "to make you forget he was ever in this movie". Perri Nemiroff for Collider said that Boseman shines as "the only cast member who really seems to understand the movie he's in".

=== 2016–2019: Marvel Cinematic Universe, Marshall and 21 Bridges ===
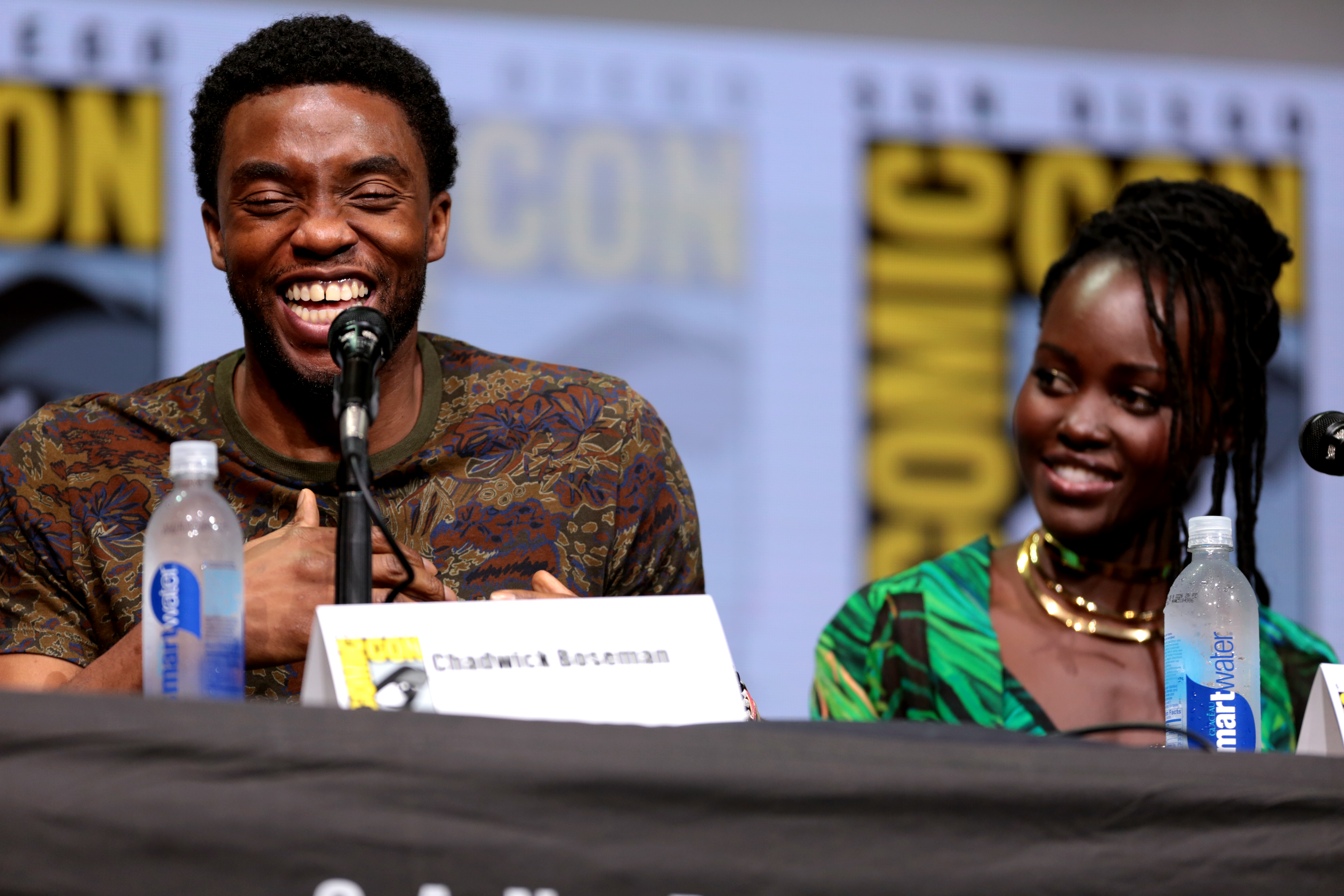
Boseman and Black Panther co-star Lupita Nyong'o at the 2017 San Diego Comic-Con

In 2016, Boseman began portraying the Marvel Comics character T'Challa / Black Panther in the Marvel Cinematic Universe. Captain America: Civil War was his first film in a five-picture deal with Marvel Entertainment. He did not audition for the role, instead having a "discussion about what [Marvel] wanted to do and how [he] saw it and what [he] wanted to do." While working on Civil War, Boseman learned some Xhosa from John Kani, who played his father, and insisted on using the language for the character. Boseman also developed a Wakandan accent himself, and used it during the entire production "whether he was on camera or not". When asked by journalist Ryan Gilbey if he felt pressure not to "screw up" the beloved comics character, Boseman responded by saying: "It's more positive than that. It's more like: 'Seize it. Enjoy it.'" He told the Associated Press, though, that he more identified with the Black Panther's nemesis, Killmonger, knowing that his roots to his African past had been severed. Producer Kevin Feige explained that the Black Panther was included in Civil War "because [they] needed a third party. [It] needed fresh eyes [of a character] who wasn't embedded with the Avengers and who has a very different point of view than either Tony or Steve." Boseman's performance in Civil War was highly praised, though critics acknowledged the character's inclusion was largely to set up his upcoming headlining movie.

We know what it's like to be told there isn't a screen for you to be featured on, a stage for you to be featured on. [...] We know what it's like to be beneath and not above. And that is what we went to work with every day. We knew that we could create a world that exemplified a world we wanted to see. We knew that we had something to give.

— Boseman accepting the Screen Actors Guild Award for Outstanding Performance by a Cast in a Motion Picture in 2019.

Boseman returned as the Black Panther in Black Panther (2018), directed by Ryan Coogler, which focused on the character and his home country of Wakanda in Africa. The film opened to great anticipation, becoming one of the highest-grossing films. The role earned Boseman a spot on the 2018 Time 100 as one of the world's most influential people, with Sean Combs writing his entry. It is seen as a landmark in being the first mega-budget movie to have a predominantly black cast and director, as well as the first superhero film to be nominated for an Academy Award for Best Picture. The film received universal acclaim and Boseman was praised; Matthew Norman for the Evening Standard said that he "brings a measure of sub-Shakespearean gravitas to T'Challa's struggle to bear the weight of his crown"; Richard Lawson and Sight & Sound's Kelli Weston also noted the strength of gravitas Boseman gave to the performance. Weston added that he, "despite having the more thankless role [out of T'Challa and Killmonger], carries the film with a quiet dignity one might rightfully expect of a man raised to be king." Todd McCarthy and The Village Voice's Kristen Yoonsoo Kim saw that while Boseman played his serious character well, the cast was full of charismatic scene stealers. Peter Travers gave much praise to Boseman as the lead, and said that he "digs so deep into T'Challa that you can feel his nerve endings"; LaSalle wrote that "Boseman commands every moment of this film, radiating probity and purpose, and it's only later on that you realize that, with another actor, this wouldn't have been a sure thing."

He reprised the role in both Avengers: Infinity War and Avengers: Endgame, which were released in 2018 and 2019, respectively. Both films were the highest grossing of the year they were released, with Endgame going on to become the highest-grossing film of all time. Infinity War was filmed at the same time as Black Panther, and Boseman and other actors playing Wakandan characters improvised chanting scenes in the former that originated in the latter. Boseman's last physical appearance as Black Panther was in Endgame, at Tony Stark's funeral; he voiced alternate versions of T'Challa in the 2021 Disney+ animated series What If...?.

Boseman portrayed Thurgood Marshall in the biographical film Marshall in 2017. Set years before he became the first African American Supreme Court Justice, the movie focuses on one of Marshall's early cases, the trial of Joseph Spell. It was premiered at Howard University, which both Boseman and Marshall had attended. Boseman was still worried about being put into a "biopic box", and felt that he didn't look enough like the real Marshall, but took the role because he enjoyed the script "separate from the historical relevance"; he had expected big courtroom speeches but found that in the case Marshall was silenced by the judge and had to mentor white co-counsel Sam Friedman (Josh Gad) to take on his first criminal case. He told The New York Times that he liked this element of the story because "it doesn't allow you as an audience member, no matter what color you are, to hide from the issues". Boseman researched Marshall extensively before portraying him, as well as studying videos of him speaking and losing muscle to reflect the younger Marshall's wiry frame. The film opened to an average critical reception, though Boseman's performance was praised. However, Vulture criticized his casting, noting that, unlike Boseman, "the real-life Marshall was a light-skinned man, and his place on the color spectrum undoubtedly influenced how he became such a legend." Boseman had been concerned about their differences before taking the role, but was convinced by the director and producer that as the film was telling an insular story it did not matter as much.

In 2019, he starred in 21 Bridges, an American action thriller film directed by Brian Kirk, as an NYPD detective who shuts down the eponymous twenty-one bridges of Manhattan to find two suspected cop killers. He was approached to work on the film by two of its producers, Avengers directors the Russo brothers, at the Infinity War premiere. While 21 Bridges was filming, the Russos and Boseman were working on Endgame. Boseman was also a producer on 21 Bridges, something he said was made clear to him in his early conversations with the production team; the three producers are given a nod in one of the film's opening lines, when a character is described as an "avenger". All of the film's characters were originally conceived as male and white, with Boseman encouraging amendments to this and other parts of the story. In his capacity as a producer, Boseman sought out Sienna Miller to be his co-star; Miller, who was intending to take a break from acting while her daughter was young, asked for a salary that the studio would not meet, and so Boseman donated the rest from his own pay. He also personally called Stephan James to ask him to play one of the criminals Boseman's detective is hunting; the two actors had been planning to work more together after the film. Boseman said that he and Coles "fought for casting and for actors that brought particular sensibilities and feelings".

As an actor, Boseman developed his character by going on calls with the NYPD and LAPD, which he said influenced the writing after he fed back his experiences, and learning how to fire blanks and handle a gun with a police weapons specialist. While the film received mixed reviews, the cast was praised; Clarisse Loughrey of The Independent wrote that the film was indelicate in its storytelling, but that Boseman "finds a surprising amount to work with in such a basic, stock character", while the Los Angeles Times said that "Chadwick Boseman and thin characters cannot keep 21 Bridges from collapsing". Glenn Kenny of RogerEbert.com was more positive towards the film, writing that "it's no small feat to tie up an intelligent action thriller with such assuredness" and that "Boseman [...] does a lot of running and driving and gun-pointing and car-hood slamming here, but his character also does a lot of thinking – and a lot of maneuvering."

=== 2020: Da 5 Bloods and Ma Rainey's Black Bottom ===
In 2019, Boseman was announced as part of the cast for the Netflix films Da 5 Bloods, directed by Spike Lee, and Ma Rainey's Black Bottom, directed by George C. Wolfe. He took these "bucket-list roles" for opportunities to work with Lee and with Ma Rainey producer Denzel Washington, as well as the opportunity to perform in an August Wilson play, telling Entertainment Weekly that he wanted to make these non-superhero films because "if you don't do the films that you plan to do, I think you wouldn't feel fulfilled as an artist." He was also cast in a film telling the story of Yasuke, the only non-Asian samurai and the first black man in Japan, which he was set to co-produce; Boseman said: "[the story is] not just an action movie, [it is] a cultural event, an exchange, and I am excited to be part of it." Time included Boseman on their list of the 10 Best Movie Performances of 2020, for both Da 5 Bloods and Ma Rainey; for Ma Rainey, Boseman received posthumous nominations in the Best Actor category at the Academy Awards, Actor Awards, British Academy Film Awards, and Golden Globe Awards , becoming the eighth person (and seventh man) to receive a posthumous Academy Award acting nomination.

Da 5 Bloods was released on June 12, 2020. Lee, in choosing Boseman for the divine-like character of Stormin' Norman, said: "This character is heroic; he's a superhero. Who do we cast? We cast Jackie Robinson, James Brown, Thurgood Marshall, and we cast T'Challa." Reception of his character was mostly positive; for the Associated Press, Jocelyn Noveck wrote that Boseman played Norman "with movie-star charisma and classic war-movie grit", and Empire's Kambole Campbell said his performance had "regal charisma", while Chuck Bowen of Slant said that he "has a hauntingly gaunt presence, but he's already played too many saints." The A.V. Club's Ashley Ray-Harris felt the lack of digital de-aging for the other characters was unsuccessful in its aims and that "Lee's script doesn't give Boseman much to do outside of this confused, Christ-like characterization and never exposes Norman's own naïveté." Conversely, Peter Bradshaw of The Guardian saw it as a reflection that "[he] has grown not old as those that are left grew old", and a way to show how Norman has been romanticized in his comrades' memories; Odie Henderson of RogerEbert.com had a similar view and said that Boseman was "a perfect casting move", with the actor already carrying such a mythical status in black culture that he does not need to do much to be a believable mythical black icon as Norman.

For the songs, rituals and folklore that were lost in slavery's middle passage, [August Wilson's] plays are those forgotten songs remixed for the struggles of adapting to these shores [...] In the similar way that Wilson's work was influenced by the blues of Bessie Smith, Muddy Waters and W. C. Handy, my plays were infused with Tupac, Biggie and Black Star.

— Boseman on August Wilson, 2013.

The film Ma Rainey's Black Bottom, in which Boseman co-stars as trumpeter Levee, was released after the actor's death in 2020. Director Wolfe said that Boseman was excited by the role for the challenge it posed, saying that "it's a monster role and it's a thrilling role, it's a difficult role. All of those things are exhilarating for an actor. And [Boseman] rose to the occasion and more than delivered." The film is based on the August Wilson play of the same name; Boseman was a fan of Wilson and wrote about him and his inspiration on Boseman's own work in a 2013 essay for the Los Angeles Times. According to Chris Jones, Boseman's Levee is "an astonishing, revelatory performance and formidably distinct from the numerous interpretations seen on the stage"; A. O. Scott of The New York Times similarly opined that "it will be hard, from now on, to imagine [...] a Levee to compare with Boseman." Angelica Jade Bastién for Vulture wrote at length on Boseman's performance, saying that "many of the important turns in the film hinge on Boseman's presence at the center. [...] In the first of his lachrymose monologues, Boseman is called to embody [anger and] gives the scene his all." Charlotte O'Sullivan of the Evening Standard said Boseman was brave to take on a "more curdled" role than the heroic leaders he is best known for, and that "as skilful as he was talented, [he] hits the right notes, all the time." Clarisse Loughrey wrote that it was the actor's finest performance, that "when [he] rages against an unjust God [...] it strikes like thunder" and is "delivered with such grace that there's a sense he had another hundred performances like it still in him."

In 2022, Boseman posthumously won the Primetime Emmy Award for Outstanding Character Voice-Over Performance for the What If...? episode "What If... T'Challa Became a Star-Lord?" at the 74th Primetime Emmy Awards.

== Personal life ==
=== Family ===
Boseman began dating singer Taylor Simone Ledward in 2015. The two were reportedly engaged by October 2019, and married six days before his death.

Boseman was raised a Christian and was baptized. He was part of a church choir and youth group and his former pastor said that he still kept his faith.

=== Philanthropy ===
Outside of performing, Boseman supported various charities. He worked with cancer charities including St. Jude Children's Research Hospital, continuing to support those battling the disease up until his own death from it; in a message to a producer days before he died, Boseman inquired about sending gifts to childhood cancer patients. He donated $10,000 to the Boys and Girls Club of Harlem to provide free tickets for children who wanted to see Black Panther; he did this to support and promote the Black Panther Challenge started by a New Yorker to raise money for similar children across the country. In response, Disney donated $1 million to the Boys & Girls Clubs to advance its STEM programs. Boseman advocated for children's charities, with the Jackie Robinson Foundation noting after his death that he helped with their youth outreach. When Disney planned to donate $400 million to charitable causes, Boseman encouraged the move. In April 2020, he donated $4.2 million in personal protective equipment to hospitals fighting the COVID-19 pandemic in black communities, starting his own Operation 42 challenge to encourage others to donate PPE.

=== Advocacy ===
In politics, Boseman supported the When We All Vote campaign, and his last tweet before his death was congratulating Kamala Harris on her selection as Joe Biden's vice-presidential nominee. Prior to the 2018 midterm elections, Boseman urged Twitter followers to visit VoteRiders online or call the organization's helpline to ensure eligible voters had the ID needed to cast a ballot.

== Illness and death ==
Boseman was diagnosed with stage III colon cancer in 2016. It progressed to stage IV before 2020. He never spoke publicly about his cancer diagnosis, and according to The Hollywood Reporter, "Only a handful of non-family members knew that Boseman was sick... with varying degrees of knowledge about the severity of [his] condition." During treatment, involving multiple surgeries and chemotherapy, he continued to work and completed production for several films, including Marshall, Da 5 Bloods, Ma Rainey's Black Bottom, and others.

Boseman died at his Los Angeles home as a result of complications related to colon cancer on August 28, 2020, with his wife and family by his side. He was 43 years old. He died intestate, and his estate was governed by California law with the representation of Ledward, his widow.

A public memorial service was held on September 4, 2020, in Anderson, South Carolina. Speakers included Boseman's childhood pastor as well as Deanna Brown-Thomas, daughter of James Brown, whom Boseman portrayed in Get on Up. The city announced plans for the creation of a permanent art memorial at the service. Despite reports that Boseman was buried at Welfare Baptist Church cemetery in nearby Belton, South Carolina, the funeral home handling the services and the church pastor both denied this.

=== Response ===
Many fellow actors and other celebrities paid tribute to Boseman on social media following the announcement of his death, including a number of his Marvel Cinematic Universe co-stars. Marvel Studios president and CCO Kevin Feige called Boseman's death, "absolutely devastating", writing: "Each time he stepped on set, he radiated charisma and joy, and each time he appeared on screen, he created something truly indelible [...] Now he takes his place [as] an icon for the ages." Co-stars from Boseman's other films also paid tribute to him. His alma mater, Howard University, tweeted in reaction that "his incredible talent will forever be immortalized through his characters and through his own personal journey from student to superhero".

On August 29, 2020, the day after Boseman died, the tweet in which his family announced his death on his Twitter account became the most-liked tweet in history, with over six million likes in under 24 hours, and accumulating over seven million by August 31, far displacing the previous record holder. His death was likened to other unexpected deaths of other celebrities in 2020, particularly Kobe Bryant and Naya Rivera. The Associated Press and Clarín noted Rivera and Boseman as Hollywood's most impactful 2020 deaths.

Major League Baseball and the Los Angeles Dodgers, the franchise for which Jackie Robinson played when the team was at its former home of Brooklyn, New York, issued statements honoring Boseman, in light of his acclaimed portrayal of the player. Several publications noted Boseman died on the observance of Jackie Robinson Day, (Note: Jackie Robinson Day is April 15, but in 2020 was observed on August 28 due to the COVID-19 pandemic.) seven years after his having portrayed Robinson. Prior to the fifth game between the Los Angeles Lakers and the Portland Trail Blazers in the NBA playoffs, Boseman was honored with a moment of silence, alongside Cliff Robinson and Lute Olson. When Lewis Hamilton claimed pole position in qualifying at the 2020 Belgian Grand Prix, he dedicated his lap to Boseman, as well as his race win the following day.

=== Tributes ===
On August 28, 2020, a Change.org petition was started, seeking to replace a Confederate monument in his hometown of Anderson with a statue of Boseman; it collected more than 50,000 signatures in less than a week, surpassing its original goal of 15,000 signatures. Henry McMaster, the Governor of South Carolina, ordered the Statehouse flags be lowered to half-staff on August 30 in honor of Boseman, who was born and raised in the state. ABC (which, like Marvel Entertainment, is owned by Disney) aired a commercial-free version of Black Panther, followed by a special about Boseman's life and work titled Chadwick Boseman – A Tribute for a King on the same day. Also aired on August 30 was the 2020 MTV Video Music Awards; the ceremony was dedicated to Boseman. On September 24, 2020, Disney unveiled a mural titled King Chad, by artist Nikkolas Smith dedicated to Boseman at Downtown Disney in Anaheim, California. In February 2021, another mural dedicated to Boseman was painted at Trilith Studios in Fayetteville, Georgia, by artist Brandon Sadler. Following his Best Actor win at the Academy Awards in April 2021, Anthony Hopkins said, "I want to pay tribute to Chadwick Boseman, who was taken from us far too early [...]."

Boseman is also memorialized in the 2020 video game Marvel's Spider-Man: Miles Morales. The game includes an after-credits message dedicating it in memory of Boseman, as well as a street called Boseman Way on 42nd Street; the number 42 bears significance in the Miles Morales mythos as well as referring to Boseman's portrayal of Jackie Robinson. A Wakandan flag also appears. Amazon also made Black Panther comic titles available for free on its ComiXology platform in the wake of Boseman's death. On November 29, 2020, Marvel changed the studio's logo animation in the opening of Black Panther on Disney+ to include images of Boseman from the film, as well as his appearances in Captain America: Civil War, Avengers: Infinity War, and Avengers: Endgame, to honor what would have been Boseman's 44th birthday.

In a 2020 tribute, Ryan Coogler, the director of Black Panther and its 2022 sequel, offered condolences to Boseman's family and said that he had spent the last year "preparing, imagining and writing words for him to say [in the sequel] that we weren't destined to see". Coogler and Marvel Studios executives were unaware of Boseman's illness until his death. By the time of Boseman's death, Coogler was in the middle of writing the script and had already turned in a draft. Also paying tribute, Feige confirmed that the role of T'Challa would not be recast. Producer Nate Moore said that Boseman "was such an integral part of that character for us, both as the character and as a person, that we could not conceive of a version with having someone else on set".

Co-writers Coogler and Joe Robert Cole reworked the script following Boseman's death. The sequel, Black Panther: Wakanda Forever (2022), depicts T'Challa's death from illness and Wakandans processing the resultant grief; the Marvel Studios opening, usually featuring other MCU characters, only depicts the faint sound of wind and images of Boseman. T'Challa's sister Shuri (played by Letitia Wright) would eventually succeed him as Black Panther. Wright struggled with becoming Black Panther on the sequel as she felt bitter about how that had come to pass, and felt guilty for doing it. She credited Coogler and her costar Danai Gurira for helping her with the transition. The end credits featured the words "Dedicated to our friend Chadwick Boseman", and The Independent described Wakanda Forever as a "soulful Chadwick Boseman tribute". Coogler said that while the film was a tribute to Boseman, it was also a tribute to the resilience of the cast to "honor Boseman".

On April 8, 2025, Hannah Beachler revealed on her X page that the way the church in the film Sinners was designed included crossed beams which made the "Wakanda forever" gesture and paid homage to Boseman. Michael B. Jordan would publicly pay tribute to Boseman when accepting the Best Actor award for Sinners at the 2026 NAACP Image Awards.

== Reputation and legacy ==
According to film critic Owen Gleiberman of Variety, "Boseman was a virtuoso actor who had the rare ability to create a character from the outside in and the inside out [and he] knew how to fuse with a role, etching it in three dimensions [...] That's what made him an artist, and a movie star, too. Yet in Black Panther, he also became that rare thing, a culture hero". Similarly, reviewer Richard Brody in The New Yorker finds the originality of Boseman's formidable acting technique in his ability to empathize with the interior lives of his characters and render them on screen as fully and completely belonging to the character. He was uniquely able to capture and portray the dignity of his characters, according to The New York Times critic Wesley Morris. Well known for taking biopic roles, Hanna Flint for the BBC said he became the frequent choice because of his dedication to embodying character. Peter Bradshaw wrote of the actor's "beauty, his grace, his style, his presence [...] These made up Chadwick Boseman's persona [and he became] the lost prince of American cinema[,] glorious and inspirational".

Culture writer Steve Rose of The Guardian said that Boseman's career was revolutionary, and that due to his careful planning and selection of roles, he "leaves behind a gamechanging legacy". Rose further wrote:

Chadwick Boseman began his career playing African American icons and pioneers; he ends it as one himself. His [...] achievements, as an actor and as a cultural force, will surely prove to be as heroic as those of the characters he portrayed. At the very least, he leaves the film-making landscape looking very different to how it was when he entered it.

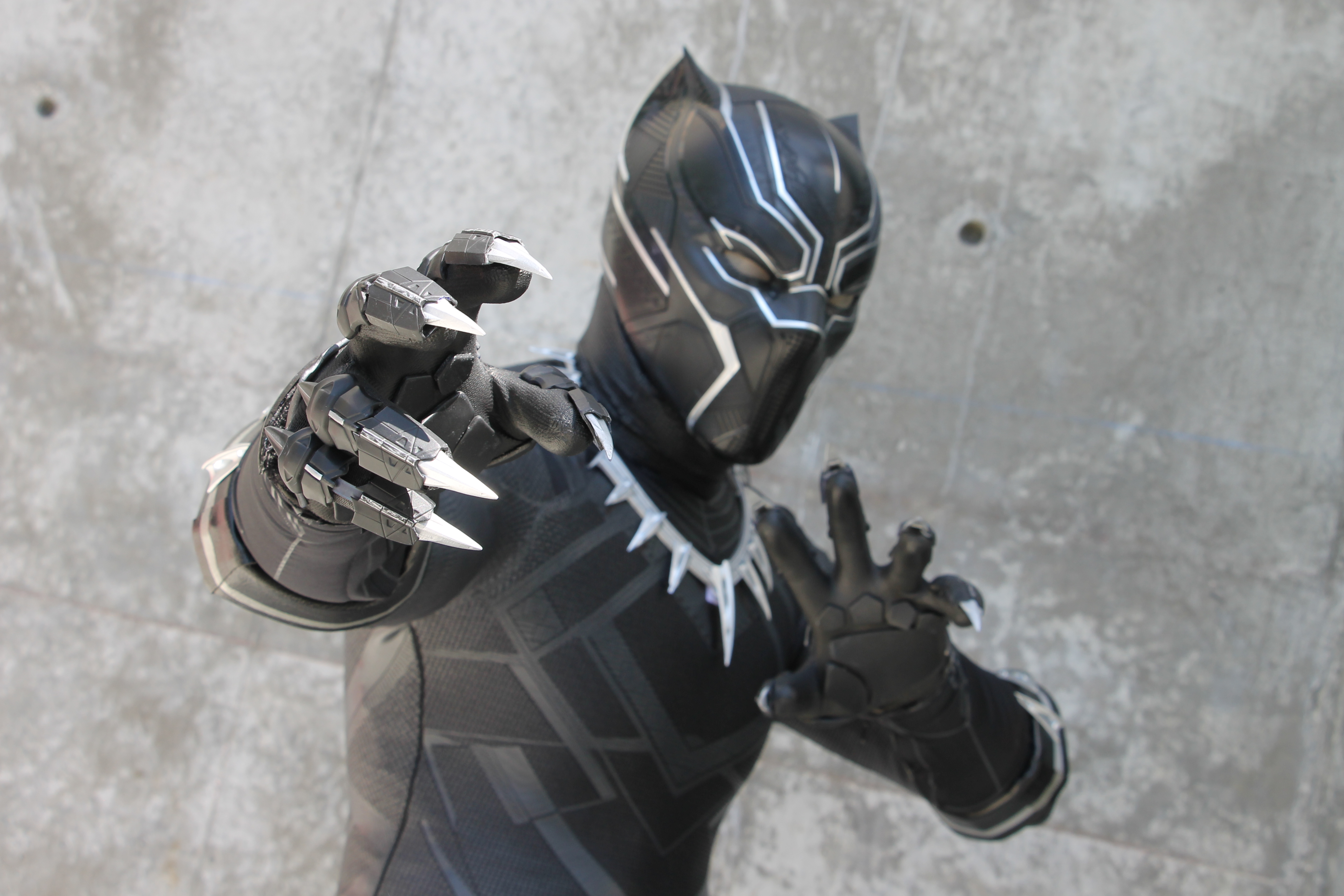
A cosplay of the Black Panther at FanimeCon 2018

As the Black Panther, Boseman led a predominantly black cast in a major blockbuster for the first time; Variety said that "the significance of Chadwick Boseman [...] to the African American and Black community is immeasurable." Further expressing the weight of Boseman's legacy, Robert Daniels wrote for Vulture that "his performance [as T'Challa] wouldn't just be a demonstration of craft [...] It'd become a piece of history. He'd face a slew of pressures, because a Black epic, even a period piece, is forever expected to be important, representative of the past, present, and future." He told BBC Culture that "through his acting, [Boseman] wrote, rewrote, and reclaimed black history". Boseman's Ma Rainey co-star Viola Davis told Rose that "he is going to be remembered as a hero", both as the Black Panther and for the authentic man he was, and that "his legacy, his body of work, his integrity, is going to influence on generations upon generations to come." BBC Culture called him "a film icon who changed Hollywood"; "a symbol of black excellence and of cinematic excellence"; and "a virtuoso and heroic figure, not just because of his iconic turn as Marvel's Black Panther but for how he raised the bar for racial equality and representation on screen."

Rhea Combs, film curator of the Smithsonian National Museum of African American History and Culture, said that with his screen presence, Boseman "was not only a conduit to the past and the way African-Americans persevered and pushed through so many challenges, he also represented brightness and the promise of tomorrow". The BBC also noted his impact of infusing African authenticity into his work, including his motivations for taking a role in Gods of Egypt as well as how T'Challa is presented, saying that he "connect[s] African-American audiences with their African heritage".

His alma mater, Howard University, renamed its College of Fine Arts in honor of Boseman on May 26, 2021. On March 19, 2024, the Anderson School District Five Board of Trustees, the school district in which Boseman attended, renamed the performing arts center at Southwood Academy of the Arts in his honor. The Harlem Globetrotters honored Boseman by selecting him as their draft pick.

X-Men '97, the revival of X-Men: The Animated Series, premiered on March 20, 2024, in Disney+ but featured T'Chaka instead of T'Challa as the show's Black Panther despite Fantastic Four having previously established T'Challa as the current Black Panther. When asked about this continuity error on his Twitter account, showrunner Beau DeMayo stated that when developing the show's first season in early 2021, he and Marvel Studios felt it was too soon to feature T'Challa since Boseman's death so they chose to "put humanity before continuity" by featuring T'Chaka instead. For Black Panther: Wakanda Forever, Marvel opted to not recast T’Challa. They instead had the character die off screen at the beginning of the film. His sister Shuri, played by Letitia Wright, would later succeed him as Black Panther.

The T'Challa / Black Panther variant of the What If...? episode "What If... Zombies?!" returns in the Marvel Zombies television series, but in a nonspeaking role. Showrunner Bryan Andrews and executive producer Brad Winderbaum attributed this decision to their wishes to respect Boseman by having Peter Parker / Spider-Man narrate those moments depicting T'Challa onscreen so they can revisit his character in "some strange way" to be with him, while acknowledging that if Boseman were still alive, they would have taken "completely different choices". They showed an early animatic to Black Panther (2018) and Black Panther: Wakanda Forever (2022) director Ryan Coogler to get his notes, who gave them some great ideas for the sequence that were "really additive".

== Filmography ==
=== Film ===
Year	Title	Role	Notes	Ref.
2004	Love is a Fallacy	Young man	Short film	
2004	Date	New Yorker	Short film	
2006	LadyLike	Male lead	Short film	
2007	The Appointment	The Mover	Short film	
2008	The Express: The Ernie Davis Story	Floyd Little		
2008	Blood Over a Broken Pawn	—N/a	Short film; director	
2009	In Retrospect...	—N/a	Short film; Executive producer	
2012	The Kill Hole	Samuel Drake		
2013	42	Jackie Robinson		
2013	Heaven	—N/a	Short film; director	
2014	9 Kisses	Musician	Short film	
2014	Draft Day	Vontae Mack		
2014	Get On Up	James Brown		
2016	Gods of Egypt	Thoth		
2016	Captain America: Civil War	T'Challa / Black Panther		
2016	Message from the King	Jacob King	Also executive producer	
2017	Marshall	Thurgood Marshall	Also co-producer	
2018	Black Panther	T'Challa / Black Panther		
2018	Avengers: Infinity War	T'Challa / Black Panther		
2019	Avengers: Endgame	T'Challa / Black Panther		
2019	21 Bridges	Andre Davis	Also producer	
2020	Da 5 Bloods	Norman Earl "Stormin' Norm" Holloway		
2020	Ma Rainey's Black Bottom	Levee Green	Posthumous release	
2022	Black Panther: Wakanda Forever	T'Challa / Black Panther	Archival footage; Posthumous release; dedicated to his memory	

=== Television ===
Year	Title	Role	Notes	Ref.
2003	All My Children	Reggie Montgomery	Recurring role	
2003	Third Watch	David Wafer	Episode: "In Lieu of Johnson"	
2004	Law & Order	Foster Keyes	Episode: "Can I Get a Witness?"	
2006	CSI: NY	Rondo	Episode: "Heroes"	
2008	ER	Derek Taylor	Episode: "Oh, Brother"	
2008	Cold Case	Dexter Collins	Episode: "Street Money"	
2008–2009	Lincoln Heights	Nathaniel "Nate" Ray Taylor	Recurring role; 9 episodes	
2009	Lie to Me	Cabe McNeil	Episode: "Truth or Consequences"	
2010	Persons Unknown	Graham McNair	Main role; 13 episodes	
2010	The Glades	Michael Richmond	Episode: "Honey"	
2011	Castle	Chuck Russell	Episode: "Poof, You're Dead"	
2011	Detroit 1-8-7	Tommy Westin	Episode: "Beaten/Cover Letter"	
2011	Justified	Ralph Beeman	Episode: "For Blood or Money"	
2011	Fringe	Mark Little / Cameron James	Episode: "Subject 9"	
2018	Saturday Night Live	Himself	Host; episode: "Chadwick Boseman/Cardi B"	
2021	What If...?	Star Lord T'Challa / T'Challa / Black Panther	Voice; 4 episodes; Posthumous release	

=== Theatre ===
Year	Title	Role	Notes	Ref.
1993	Crossroads	Playwright		
1997–2000	Rhyme Deferred	Co-writer; Performer	Part of the Hip Hop Theatre Anthology The Fire This Time	
2002	Hieroglyphic Graffiti	Playwright	Produced at Negro Playwright's Theatre; Kuntu Repertory Theatre; National Black Theatre Festival; Hip Hop Theatre Festival	
2005	Deep Azure	Playwright	Produced by Congo Square Theatre Company; Work-shopped at the Folger Shakespeare Library; Apollo Theater	

== Awards and honors ==
Honorary degrees
Location	Date	School	Degree
District of Columbia	May 12, 2018	Howard University	Doctor of Humane Letters (DHL)

- Boseman gave the commencement address at Howard University on May 12, 2018.

== See also ==
- Chadwick Boseman: Portrait of an Artist
- List of black Academy Award winners and nominees
- List of posthumous Academy Award winners and nominees
- List of black Golden Globe Award winners and nominees
