= Awol Erizku =

Ethiopian-American contemporary artist (born 1988)

- Born: June 11, 1988 (age 38)
- Education: Yale School of Art (MFA); Cooper Union (BFA)
- Known for: Painting, photography, sculpture, film
- Notable work: "Girl With A Bamboo Earring", "Serendipity", "Oh what a feeling, aw, fuck it, I want a Trillion"

Awol Erizku (June 11, 1988) is an Ethiopian-born American contemporary artist. His primary media are painting, photography, sculpture and film. Erizku works with a wide variety of found materials. Erizku was dubbed "the art world's new 'it' boy" by Vulture Magazine in 2016. He lives in New York City and Los Angeles.

== Career ==
Erizku was born in Ethiopia and raised in New York City's South Bronx neighborhood, He cultivated an interest in photography at Cooper Union, where he earned a BFA degree in 2010. He received an MFA degree from Yale University's visual arts program in 2014.

== Black and Gold ==
Erizku's first solo show, Black and Gold, was shown at New York's Hasted-Kraeutler gallery in 2012. The show featured a series of photo portraits depicting black figures cast within classic art-historical contexts. The most famous of the works was "Girl with a Bamboo Earring", visually recalling Johannes Vermeer's famous "Girl with a Pearl Earring" with a Black model as its focus.

== The Only Way is Up ==
In 2014, Erizku returned to the Hasted-Kraeutler gallery space with The Only Way is Up, a larger exhibition featuring a variety of sculpture, mixed media and photography. With his works, he displayed mastery of the cultural landscape, invoking Hip hop including homages to artists such as Marcell Duchamp, David Hammons, Donald Judd. The exhibition drew its title from the Quincy Jones album, in turn named after the Otis Clay song, "The Only Way Is Up".

"Although Erizku's work abounds with signifiers and indicators of African American culture, it speaks more broadly to a universal quest for self-discovery."

The centerpiece of the exhibition offers a nod to rapper Jay-Z, drawing its title, Oh what a feeling, fuck it, I want a trillion, from the rapper's 2013 song "Picasso Baby". With a nod to Donald Judd's "Stacks" and 1960s minimalism, Erizku aligns seven basketball rims with 24-karat gold-plated nets, with a Brooklyn Nets team mini-basketball resting atop the highest basket. "I thought it would be interesting to replace the stacked boxes with basketball hoops, a reference to David Hammons, and also signifiers of my life in New York City," Erizku said of his work. "The piece operates as a striking metaphor, embodying the anxieties inherent to life as a young contemporary artist by aligning basketball with the practice of making art—both are games, shaped half by talent and half by luck. If you ask me, you have more to chew on when you look at those stacked hoops than those metal boxes."

Erizku released an accompanying mixtape with DJ Kitty Ca$h, in collaboration with Vice magazine, to go along with the exhibition's artwork. "The majority of that mixtape was trap, because trap is hot in hip-hop right now,” Erizku told Vice. “Music is universal and I wanted to create a musical definition of my work that spoke to my generation about the issues and ideas my work represents." The mixtape also features audio from artist Kerry James Marshall discussing the issue of black invisibility in art.

== Serendipity ==
In 2015, in collaboration with MoMA PopRally, Erizku screened films and photos in "Serendipity", an event held at the Museum of Modern Art in May.

== Slow Burn ==
In 2018, Erizku launched his first solo exhibition in Asia, Slow Burn, where it included large neon light pieces hanging on the walls. These neon lights inspired by the streets of Hong Kong depict imagery representing culture, law enforcement, and identity as the press release detailed it. As Marianna Cerini writes on the exhibition, Erizku also provided a mixtape that is incorporated for viewers to engage with that includes Kendrick Lamar and numerous artists. Erizku fully embodies his work with personal experiences as well as ongoing societal issues that are being brought into the neon lights of the art world.

== Significance ==
Erizku's work asks questions about race within the context of art history. He is centrally concerned with blackness and how black artists are viewed and canonized. "I hate when people label my work urban," he said in 2012. "Just because it's African American subjects or people of color it's not urban."

“Honestly, I don't see [my work] as just being about black culture; it's about my culture, and I'm documenting my culture," Erizku told Vulture. If we label everything as black or white or yellow or whatever, then it becomes this thing of, this belongs here, this belong there. There's an aspect in my work that I want to be universal. I never go into my studio and say, 'Well, this is strictly for this group, and I don't want this group to get it.'"

== See also ==
- Ethiopian Americans
