= Get the Grift =

2021 Brazilian film

- Promotional release poster
- Portuguese: Os Salafrários
- Directed by: Pedro Antônio Paes
- Written by: Fil Braz
- Produced by: Mayra Lucas
- Starring: Zeca Carvalho; Thelmo Fernandes; Caito Mainier
- Cinematography: Julio Costantini
- Edited by: Leonardo Gouvea
- Music by: Zé Ricardo
- Distributed by: Netflix
- Release date: April 28, 2021
- Running time: 94 minutes
- Country: Brazil
- Language: Portuguese

Get the Grift (Portuguese: Os Salafrários) is a 2021 Brazilian crime comedy film directed by Pedro Antônio Paes, written by Fil Braz and starring Zeca Carvalho, Thelmo Fernandes and Caito Mainier.

== Plot ==
Ever since his childhood, Clovis had to change from family to family since his biological father, stepmother and stepfather kept remarrying. As an adult, Clovis is a con artist while moonlighting as an art forger who paints famous paintings to sell to a corrupt senator who in turn sells them in the black market for ten times the price. Clovis's expert conning technique enables him to get free goods and services but he abides by his principle of only conning the rich, as well as paying to buy goods and services from the poor.

== Cast ==
- Zeca Carvalho
- Thelmo Fernandes
- Caito Mainier
- Marcus Majella
- Pedroca Monteiro
- Pablo Sanábio
- Samantha Schmütz

== Release ==
The film was digitally released on April 28, 2021, by Netflix.
