= Sisters on Track =

- Promotional poster
- Directed by: Tone Grøttjord-Glenne; Corinne van der Borch
- Written by: Sean Gullette
- Produced by: Tone Grøttjord-Glenne; Anita Rehoff Larsen
- Starring: Tai Sheppard; Rainn Sheppard; Brooke Sheppard
- Cinematography: Derek Howard
- Edited by: Cheree Dillon; Andrew Doga; Sloane Klevin
- Music by: Mark Batson
- Distributed by: Netflix
- Release date: June 24, 2021
- Running time: 96 minutes
- Country: United States
- Language: English

Sisters on Track is a 2021 American documentary film made for Netflix and directed by Tone Grøttjord-Glenne and Corinne van der Borch. Its story follows sisters and track and field athletes Tai, Rainn, and Brooke Sheppard as they navigate the obstacles of living in a homeless shelter with their single mother. The film was released on June 24, 2021.
