= Prime Time (2021 film) =

2021 drama film

- Sundance release poster
- Directed by: Jakub Piątek
- Written by: Jakub Piątek; Łukasz Czapski
- Produced by: Jakub Razowski
- Starring: Bartosz Bielenia; Magdalena Popławska; Andrzej Kłak; Małgorzata Hajewska-Krzysztofik; Dobromir Dymecki; Monika Frajczyk
- Cinematography: Michał Łuka
- Edited by: Ula Klimek-Piątek; Jarosław Kamiński
- Music by: Teoniki Rożynek
- Production companies: Watchout Studio; Polish Film Institute; TVN; Krakow Festival Office
- Release date: January 30, 2021 (Sundance)
- Running time: 93 minutes
- Country: Poland
- Language: Polish

Prime Time is a 2021 Polish drama thriller film co-written and directed by Jakub Piątek in his directorial debut. The film stars Bartosz Bielenia, Magdalena Popławska, Andrzej Kłak, Małgorzata Hajewska-Krzysztofik, Dobromir Dymecki, and Monika Frajczyk.

The film had its world premiere at the 2021 Sundance Film Festival on January 30, 2021.

== Cast ==
The cast include:

- Bartosz Bielenia as Sebastian
- Magdalena Popławska as Mira Kryle
- Andrzej Kłak as Grzegorz
- Małgorzata Hajewska-Krzysztofik as Laura
- Dobromir Dymecki as Commander
- Monika Frajczyk as Lena
- Adam Nawojczyk as Station Chairman
- Juliusz Chrzastowski as Sebastian Father
- Pola Blasik as Kasia

== Release ==
The film had its world premiere at the 2021 Sundance Film Festival on January 30, 2021 in the World Cinema Dramatic Competition section.

== Reception ==
On the review aggregator website Rotten Tomatoes, 56% of 16 critics' reviews are positive, with an average rating of 5.4/10.
