= Deep Azure =

Play by Chadwick Boseman

- Written by: Chadwick Boseman
- Chorus: Street Knowledge
- Characters: Azure; Deep; Tone; Roshad
- Original language: English
- Setting: Washington, D.C.

Premiere
- Date premiered: September 2005
- Place premiered: Chernin Center for the Arts, Chicago

Deep Azure is a 2005 play written by Chadwick Boseman, using lyrical verse. It tells the story of Azure, a young black woman with an eating disorder, in the wake of her fiancé's death through an act of violence.

== Development ==
The director Derrick Sanders met playwright Chadwick Boseman at Howard University in Washington, D.C., where they were involved in the Hip-hop theater movement. Sanders then co-founded the Congo Square Theatre Company in Chicago, while Boseman continued to write, direct, and teach theater in New York City. After Sanders saw a production of Boseman's play Hieroglyphic Graffiti they began discussing a commission for Boseman to write for Congo Square, with both drawing on William Shakespeare's lyricism and relationship between story and character as an influence, as well as their hip hop background. Boseman had studied Shakespeare while at Oxford University with the British American Drama Academy, and had wanted to "take urban prose and poetry and kind of lift it up like Shakespearean verse". He had also been friends with Prince Jones, a Howard student who was killed by a police officer in 2000, and wanted to depict a similar story. He combined the killing with a relationship drama, to focus on a woman with an eating disorder. Prince Jones is alluded to in the play when the deceased character Deep is referred to by saying: "This Prince left us dense and went home to God too soon."

The play was first written by Boseman as a poem. Sanders commissioned it in 2004 as Congo Square's first production; he told The Guardian that Boseman intertwined ancestry and spiritual elements in the work, "not exactly magical realism but the spirits and the motivations for the characters are intertwined". Daniel Banks directed the play at the Folger Theatre in Washington, D.C., and said it "was written as a ritual of community healing." Boseman said at the time that it was "a fusion and progression of [his] previous plays", which he did not feel fit wholly in the Hip Hop theater genre. In 2008, Boseman turned his script into a screenplay, which Sanders later said Boseman always wanted to direct.

== Characters ==
Banks said that the "characters are invested in the cultural side of hip-hop, and the community knowledge and ancestral connection to the power of the word. They are members of the global culture of hip-hop and view themselves as having a responsibility to their community and to their origins as people of African heritage." The characters' stories deal with "self-hate and self abuse" originating in personal perceptions.

- Azure, originated by Bakesta King. She has anorexia-bulimia, which is contrasted with her fiancé, Deep's, death. Boseman said that her central story "points to a woman's struggles of body image and beauty, issues that are often ignored by the misogynistic brand of Hip Hop".
- Deep, originated by Terrance Watts. Deep is a victim of racial profiling and police brutality, and was Azure's fiancé before he was shot and killed by Tone. Boseman wrote that the main tragedy of Deep's death was his youth and unfulfilled potential, that "he is a Prince – a would-be king, a would-be husband, a would-be father, and a would-be leader – whose development has been aborted before he could serve out his true purpose."
- Tone, originated by Javon Johnson. Tone is a friend to Deep and Azure who tries to help her find out what really happened. Johnson and Boseman's families knew each other in Anderson, South Carolina, and following the original production the two collaborated on works and remained friends until Boseman's death.
- Roshad, originated by Ron Conner. Boseman described this character as "vengeful".

The chorus is called Street Knowledge, characters that use popping and locking and beatboxing in their storytelling. The heightened hip hop style allows for the elements of magical realism needed to have a classical chorus "without such pricey bells and whistles".

== Performances ==
Congo Square premiered Deep Azure at the Chernin Center for the Arts in Chicago in September and October 2005. It was workshopped by Congo Square during the Hip-Hop Theatre Festival at the Apollo Theater in New York City, prior to the full production premiere. The Chicago Tribune's Chris Jones "got a kick out of [this because it was] a reversal of the usual power structure in the theater". It was also workshopped at the Folger Theatre in Washington, D.C.

Deep Azure opened at the Globe Theatre in London in February 2026.

== Reception ==
The play was nominated for a 2006 Jeff Award for Best New Work. The play is mainly about police brutality, a daring subject in 2004. Chris Jones called Boseman a "fresh talent – new, young, sophisticated, African-American writer with all of the flaws that flow from youth and inexperience and all of the excitement that draws from those very same places", and highly praised the work for its rhythm; cultural references to properties as diverse as Shakespeare and Spider-Man; and exploration of black-on-black violence, but criticized that it needed better focus. He concluded that even so, he would "hand Boseman a [playwriting] commission. Several commissions." Kris Vire for Time Out said that "one gets the sense that Boseman is making the excited young playwright's mistake of trying to cram everything he ever wanted to say into one play [but] is plainly a talented writer, and there's a lot to admire here."

Reflecting on it in 2020, Chris Jones added that the play has elements similar to the popular musical Hamilton, which Sanders and others also suggested it was a cultural precursor to.
