= Tony Parker: The Final Shot =

- Directed by: Florent Bodin
- Starring: Tony Parker
- Distributed by: Netflix
- Release date: January 6, 2021
- Running time: 98 minutes
- Country: France
- Language: French

Tony Parker: The Final Shot is a 2021 French documentary film, directed by Florent Bodin.

== Cast ==
- Tony Parker
