= Kitty Love: An Homage to Cats =

- Poster
- Dutch: Poeslief: een ode aan de kat
- Directed by: Mark Verkerk
- Written by: Dennis Gerritsen; Trui van de Brug
- Production companies: Ems Films; Netflix Studios
- Release date: September 30, 2020
- Running time: 60 minutes
- Country: Netherlands
- Language: Dutch

Kitty Love: An Homage to Cats (Dutch: Poeslief: een ode aan de kat) is a 2020 Dutch documentary film directed by Mark Verkerk and written by Dennis Gerritsen and Trui van de Brug.

== Cast ==
- Abatutu – The Cat
- Nicolette Kluijver – (voice)
- Djae Van der Helm
- Sabine Van der Helm
- Milouska Meulens
