= Dolly Parton: A MusiCares Tribute =

- Promotional poster
- Produced by: George Flanigen
- Starring: Dolly Parton; Miley Cyrus; Chris Stapleton; Katy Perry; Little Big Town
- Production company: Netflix
- Distributed by: Netflix
- Release date: April 7, 2021
- Running time: 55 minutes
- Country: United States
- Language: English

Dolly Parton: A MusiCares Tribute is a 2021 American documentary film made for Netflix and produced by George Flanigen. The film presents the 2019 MusiCares Person of the Year concert where Dolly Parton became the first country artist to receive the honor. It was released on April 7, 2021.
