= Lai Choi San =

20th-century Chinese pirate

Lai Choi San (meaning Mountain of Wealth) was a Chinese pirate active in the 1920s and 1930s. Her historicity, or at the very least the historicity of most of what is known of her, is disputed since the main source on her life is the 1931 report I Sailed with Pirates by Aleko Lilius, a journalist of dubious repute.

== Historicity ==
The primary source on Lai Choi San is the report I sailed with Chinese pirates (1931) by Aleko Lilius. Although Lilius's account of Lai Choi San is not a wholly unlikely tale, Lilius is considered a journalist of dubious repute. He described himself as being from various different countries and was arrested on fraud charges in both the Philippines and Singapore. I sailed with Chinese pirates includes photographs of women on ships, but there is no evidence beyond Lilius's word that the subjects of the photographs were pirates.

There is another source that mentions Lai Choi San, at least indicating that she was a real figure; a report by a war journalist during the Sino-Japanese War that mentions the sinking of a pirate fleet and that its captain, Lai Choi San, had chosen to go down with her ships. This account is, however, not without controversy either; according to Ulrike Klausmann in the book Women Pirates and the Politics of the Jolly Roger (1997), some other sources indicate that Lai Choi San was captured and sentenced to life in prison by the international coast guard in 1939.

== Career ==
According to Lilius, Lai Choi San was the only daughter born into a family with four sons. Her father employed her as a servant-girl during his expeditions at sea and eventually joined a pirate gang. Her father moved up through the ranks and after some time became captain himself, commanding seven junks. After Lai Choi San's father died, she took command of the fleet and added five further junks, bringing the total number of ships under her command to twelve. Lilius describes her as intelligent, attractive, ruthless and cruel. He is believed to have emphasized her physical appearance for the sake of making her an interesting subject for his report.

Lilius supposedly met Lai Choi San, perhaps at a brothel, and claimed to have accompanied her on expeditions in the vicinity of Macao in the late 1920s. She supposedly dressed in a white satin robe and adorned herself with gold rings and jade while on land in Macao but dressed less elegantly while on her ships, where she wore pants and took off her shoes. According to Lilius she preferred to run her operations from land, dispatching order to the captains of her ships, but also at times set sail herself. While sailing she was always accompanied by her serving women and stayed in her private quarters, where other members of the crew were not allowed to enter. Lai Choi San operated semi-legally as an "inspector", someone who other boat owners paid money to in order to guard their boats from other pirates. Her fees were very high, bordering on extortion, and if her clients did not pay she kidnapped them and put them under torture until one of their relatives delivered the sum. She operated with little interference from either Portuguese or Chinese authorities.

Lilius describes her fleet as "twelve smooth-bore, medieval-looking cannons onboard, and two rather modern ones. Along the bulwarks of the junk were bolted rows of heavy iron plates". Her crew are referred to as ladrones (pirates, robbers) by the Portuguese and, according to Lilius, were "all fearsome fellows, muscular bare-chested men who wore wide-brimmed hats and tied red kerchiefs around their necks and heads."

== Influence in culture ==
In Missee Lee, Arthur Ransome's young adult novel set in the South China Sea waters, the title role is taken by a character who shares many of Lai Choi San's distinguishing characteristics. Missee Lee, who commands a flotilla of armed junks sailed by muscular Chinese pirates, both kidnaps and then rescues the heroic English children sailing in the area.

Lai Choi San was also the model for the Dragon Lady, one of the main villains which appeared in the comic, radio and television series Terry and the Pirates. The series creator Milton Caniff later claimed to have been inspired by reading a story about her. The character would heavily influence the stock character who is usually portrayed as a beautiful yet cold-hearted villainess, as seen in later popular culture. In another book called Los Futbolisímos by Roberto Santiago, a Spanish thief called Almudena García uses Lai Choi San's name as a pseudonym.
