= Terry and the Pirates (disambiguation) =

Terry and the Pirates is the title of:

- Terry and the Pirates (comic strip), the comic strip created by Milton Caniff
- Terry and the Pirates (radio serial), a radio serial based on the comic strip
- Terry and the Pirates (serial), a 1940 serial based on the comic strip
- Terry and the Pirates (TV series), a television series based on the comic strip
