= The Nesting =

1981 horror film

- Theatrical release poster
- Directed by: Armand Weston
- Written by: Daria Price; Armand Weston
- Produced by: Armand Weston
- Starring: Robin Groves; Christopher Loomis; Michael David Lally; John Carradine; Gloria Grahame
- Cinematography: João Fernandes
- Edited by: Jack Foster
- Music by: Jack Malken; George Kim Scholes
- Production company: Nesting Productions
- Distributed by: Feature Films
- Release date: May 8, 1981
- Running time: 104 minutes
- Country: United States
- Language: English

The Nesting (later released as Massacre Mansion) is a 1981 American supernatural horror film directed and co-written by Armand Weston, and starring Robin Groves, Michael Lally, John Carradine, and Gloria Grahame in her final film role. Its plot follows an agoraphobic novelist who rents a rural mansion that she comes to find is haunted by the prostitute victims of a mass murder that occurred there in the 1940s.

Filmed in Irvington, New York at the Armour-Stiner House, The Nesting was given a limited theatrical release in the spring of 1981 before being reissued by William Mishkin Motion Pictures in 1983 under the alternate title Massacre Mansion.

While not prosecuted for obscenity, the film was seized and confiscated in the UK under Section 3 of the Obscene Publications Act 1959 during the video nasty panic

== Plot ==
New York City novelist Lauren Cochran has agoraphobia. In an attempt to overcome her ailment, she rents a stately Victorian mansion in upstate New York from physicist Daniel Griffith and his ailing grandfather, Colonel Lebrun. A series of strange occurrences begin after Lauren moves in. When she meets Colonel Lebrun, he suffers a stroke at the sight of her, leading her to suspect that the house may be haunted after experiencing bizarre dreams of women lounging around the house. She also feels as though she has seen the home before and realizes that an illustration of it appears in one of her novels, entitled The Nesting.

One day, while investigating the turret at the peak of the house, Lauren becomes trapped outside on the window ledge, and has a vision of a woman inside. Her psychiatrist, Dr. Webber, arrives at the house, and is killed while attempting to save her. Several days later, Lauren is attacked by Frank Beasley, a handyman, at the house. He in turn has a vision of a phantom woman and is then attacked by invisible forces. He flees the house in terror, opens the door to his truck and sees a vision of two women's corpses inside. He runs into the woods and stumbles into a pond, where he is dragged under by ghostly hands and drowns.

Lauren, bothered by the events occurring in the house, visits a local man, Abner Welles, to ask about the house after having heard Frank mention his name. Abner, a drunk with a bad reputation in town, becomes erratic and violent when she inquires about the house's history, and chases her away in his car. The two get into a car accident, and Lauren flees on foot and hides in a barn. Abner finds her, and attempts to attack her with a pitchfork, but it is torn from his hands by an unseen force. Lauren then stabs him through the head with a scythe, killing him.

Lauren's visions in the house become increasingly bizarre, and she begins having precognitive dreams. It is revealed by Col. Lebrun to Daniel that the home was a former brothel during World War II, and that Frank and Abner murdered several prostitutes and soldiers in the home and dumped their bodies in the nearby pond.

At the house, Lauren has an intense hallucination, in which she meets Florinda, the madame of the brothel, and it is revealed that she is Florinda's granddaughter and, as an infant, was the lone survivor of the murders in the home. At the end of the film, she experiences a vivid hallucination in which her manuscript begins burning, and she witnesses Frank's truck crash into the house, and catch fire. At the end of the vision, she comes back to reality, and stumbles out of the house at dawn.

== Cast ==
- Robin Groves as Lauren Cochran
- Christopher Loomis as Mark Felton
- Michael Lally as Daniel Griffith
- John Carradine as Col. Lebrun
- Gloria Grahame as Florinda Costello
- Bill Rowley as Frank Beasley
- David Tabor as Abner Welles
- Patrick Farrelly as Dr. Webb
- Bobo Lewis as Catherine Beasley
- June Berry as Saphire
- Ann Varley as Gwen
- Cecile Liebman as Helga
- Ron Levine as Leland Lebrun

== Production ==
=== Filming ===
Prior to The Nesting, director Armand Weston had primarily worked as a director of pornographic films, such as Defiance! (1975) and The Taking of Christina (1976). The film was primarily shot on location at the Armour-Stiner House at 45 West Clinton Avenue in Irvington, New York, with an original working title of Phobia.

The film marked actress Gloria Grahame's final screen performance, as she died several months after the film's release.

== Release ==
The Nesting was initially given a limited theatrical release in the United States by Feature Film Releasing. It opened in Florida on May 8, 1981. It was released in Indianapolis, Indiana later in the year on December 4, 1981, and on December 11, 1981 in Buffalo, New York. In the fall of 1982, the film was shown on television on HBO.

In the spring of 1983, William Mishkin Motion Pictures, a distributor headed by William Mishkin, who was known for producing and distributing a variety of exploitation films, reissued the film under the alternate title Massacre Mansion, screening it in Philadelphia as a double feature with Blood Tide (1982). It continued to screen regionally in the United States under this title through 1984.

=== Home media ===
The Nesting was released on VHS by Warner Home Video in 1984.

The film was released on DVD and Blu-ray by Blue Underground on June 28, 2011, and as a DVD/Blu-ray mediabook by German company Motion Picture in May 2014. The latter edition features both a 103-minute and a 99-minute cut.

Vinegar Syndrome announced a forthcoming 4K UHD Blu-ray release scheduled for May 27, 2025, featuring an extended 110-minute cut of the film.

== Reception ==
Variety called the film an "effective tale of supernatural horror" that "resolves itself convincingly as an atmospheric haunted house thriller," also praising Groves's "intense" performance. Candice Russell, film and theater writer for the Fort Lauderdale News, described the film as a "nifty Gothic thriller" with director Armand Weston having "a firm hand on his material except for a prolonged chase near film's end". The Miami Herald's Bill Cosford praised the film, describing it as "scary and not overworked, and Weston shows a fine, gloomy hand at times."

Robert C. Trussell of The Kansas City Star praised Groves's performance, but felt the film overall was "a substandard horror effort that tries to compensate for its trite plot with large helpings of gratuitous sex and violence." The Plain Dealer's Michael Ward felt the film's tone, which mixed horror with occasional humor, was "done so badly that it is more horrible than horrifying."

TV Guide awarded the film 1/5 stars, calling it "an intriguing effort that effectively combines traditional haunted-house chills with a more modern emphasis on gore." Kurt Dahlke from DVD Talk gave the film a negative review, calling it "[an] under-the-radar 1980s potboiler". Dahlke criticized the film's lack of chills, "slo-mo sleuthing", and Loomis' character.

Brett Gallman from Oh, the Horror! wrote, "The Nesting sort of drags in general; it’s certainly too long at 103 minutes and is wildly uneven. When it wants to be a straight-up haunted house horror show, it works well; the score is definitely a high point when the film is in this mode, as the frenzied music shrieks to create tension and mood. I suppose the main problem is that it just doesn’t want to be that type of film enough."

Film historian Rob Craig wrote that the film: "Although at heart a pedestrian affair, with little in the way of character development, the production and cinematography in The Nesting are lush, and there are some impressive set pieces; overall The Nesting manages to sustain an air of dread unusual in films of this caliber."

== Sources ==
- Craig, Rob (2012). Gutter Auteur: The Films of Andy Milligan. Jefferson, North Carolina: McFarland. ISBN 978-0-786-46597-2.
- Lentz, Robert J. (2014). Gloria Grahame, Bad Girl of Film Noir: The Complete Career. Jefferson, North Carolina: McFarland. ISBN 978-0-786-43483-1.
- Parish, James Robert (1994). Ghosts and Angels in Hollywood Films: Plots, Critiques, Casts, and Credits for 264 Theatrical and Made-for-television Releases. Jefferson, North Carolina: McFarland. ISBN 978-0-899-50676-0.
