= Dragon Lady =

Stereotype and stock character

Dragon Lady is a stereotype of an East Asian or occasionally a South or Southeast Asian women with a strong, deceitful, domineering, mysterious, and often sexually alluring personality. Inspired by the characters played by actress Anna May Wong, the term comes from the female villain in the comic strip Terry and the Pirates. It has since been applied to powerful women from certain regions of Asia, as well as a number of Asian and Asian American film actresses. The stereotype has generated a large quantity of sociological literature. "Dragon Lady" is sometimes applied to persons who lived before the term became part of American slang in the 1930s.

"Dragon Lady" is one of two main stereotypes used to describe East Asian women, the other being the "Lotus Blossom" or "China Doll", which is hyper-sexualized but submissive. Dragon Lady is also used to refer to any powerful but prickly woman, usually in a derogatory fashion. (Note: Lady Bracknell in Oscar Wilde's The Importance of Being Earnest, 1895, is described in such tones and the playwright all but uses the word dragon. She is "perfectly unbearable. Never met such a Gorgon ... I don’t really know what a Gorgon is like, but I am quite sure that Lady Bracknell is one. In any case, she is a monster, without being a myth ...")

== Background ==
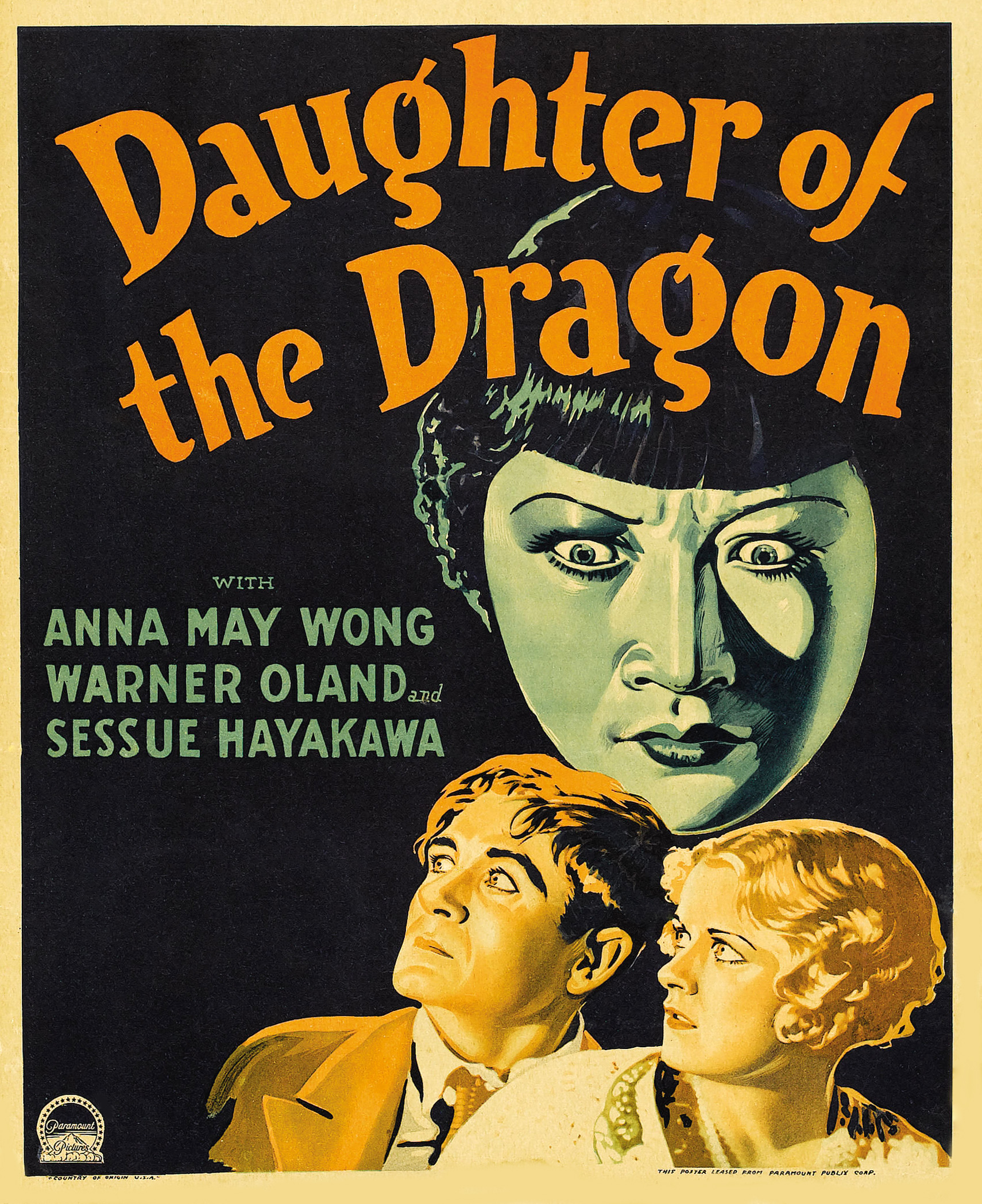
Anna May Wong as the daughter of Fu Manchu in Daughter of the Dragon (1931)

Although sources such as the Oxford English Dictionary list uses of "dragon" and even "dragoness" from the 18th and 19th centuries to indicate a fierce and aggressive woman, there does not appear to be any use in English of "Dragon Lady" before its introduction by Milton Caniff in his comic strip Terry and the Pirates. The character first appeared on December 16, 1934, and the "Dragon Lady" appellation was first used on January 6, 1935. The term does not appear in earlier "Yellow Peril" fiction such as the Fu Manchu series by Sax Rohmer or in the works of Matthew Phipps Shiel such as The Yellow Danger (1898) or The Dragon (1913). However, a 1931 film based on Rohmer’s The Daughter of Fu Manchu, titled Daughter of the Dragon, is thought to have been partly the inspiration for the Caniff cartoon name. Wong plays Princess Ling Moy, a version of Fu Manchu's daughter Fah Lo Suee.

== Terry and the Pirates ==
Terry and the Pirates was an action-adventure comic strip created by cartoonist Milton Caniff. Joseph Patterson, editor for the Chicago Tribune New York Daily News Syndicate, hired Caniff to create the new strip, providing Caniff with the idea of setting the strip in the Orient. A profile of Caniff in Time recounts the episode:

Patterson... asked: "Ever do anything on the Orient?" Caniff hadn't. "You know," Joe Patterson mused, "adventure can still happen out there. There could be a beautiful lady pirate, the kind men fall for." In a few days Caniff was back with samples and 50 proposed titles; Patterson circled Terry and scribbled beside it and the Pirates.

Caniff's biographer R. C. Harvey suggests that Patterson had been reading about women pirates in one of two books (or both) published a short time earlier: I Sailed with Chinese Pirates by Aleko Lilius and Vampires of the Chinese Coast by Bok (pseudonym for unknown). Women pirates in the South China Sea figure in both books, especially the one by Lilius, a portion of which is dedicated to the mysterious and real-life "queen of the pirates" (Lilius’ phrase), named Lai Choi San (Chinese: 來財山). "Lai Choi San" is a transliteration from Cantonese, the native language of the woman, herself—thus, the way she pronounced her own name. Caniff appropriated the Chinese name, Lai Choi San, as the "real name" of his Dragon Lady, a fact that led both Lilius and Bok to protest. Patterson pointed out that both books claimed to be non-fiction and that the name belonged to a real person; thus, neither the fact of a woman pirate nor her name could be copyrighted. (Neither Bok nor Lilius used the term "Dragon Lady". Sources are not clear on whether it was Patterson or Caniff who coined that actual term, though it was almost certainly one of the two.)

== Usage ==
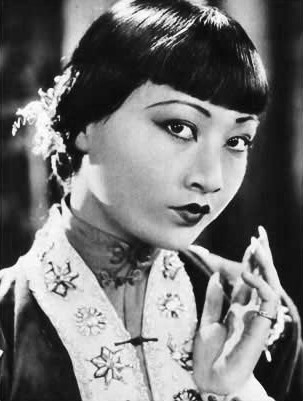
Actress Anna May Wong

Since the 1930s, when "Dragon Lady" became fixed in the English language, the term has been applied countless times to powerful East, Southeast and South Asian women, such as Madame Nhu of South Vietnam, also known as Tran Le Xuan, Soong Mei-ling, also known as Madame Chiang Kai-shek, Devika Rani of India, and to any number of Asian or Asian American film actresses. That stereotype—as is the case with other racial caricatures—has generated a large quantity of sociological literature.

Today, "Dragon Lady" is often applied anachronistically to refer to persons who lived before the term became part of American slang in the 1930s. For example, one finds the term in recent works about the "Dragon Lady" Empress Dowager Cixi (Empress Dowager Tzu-hsi; Chinese: 慈禧太后; pinyin: Cíxī Tàihòu; Wade–Giles: Tz'u^{²}-hsi^{¹} T'ai^{⁴}-hou^{⁴}), who was alive at the turn of the 20th century, or references to Chinese-American actress Anna May Wong as having started her career in the 1920s and early 1930s in "Dragon Lady" roles. In both these cases, however, articles written in the early 1900s about the Empress Dowager or reviews of Wong’s early films such as The Thief of Bagdad (1924) or Daughter of the Dragon (1931)—reviews written when the films appeared—make no use of the term "Dragon Lady". (One writer, however, did refer to the Empress Dowager as "a little lady Bismarck.") Today’s anachronistic use of "Dragon Lady" in such cases may lead the modern reader to assume that the term was in earlier use than appears to be the case.

Anna May Wong was the contemporary actress to assume the Dragon Lady role in American Cinema in the movie Daughter of the Dragon, which premiered in 1931. Josef von Sternberg's 1941 The Shanghai Gesture contains a performance by Ona Munson as 'Mother' Gin Sling, the proprietor of a gambling house, that bears mention within presentations of the genre. Other American or British films in which Asian women are hyper-sexualized include The Thief of Baghdad, The Good Woman of Bangkok, and 101 Asian Debutantes, where Asian women are portrayed as prostitutes. Miss Saigon is an American musical with examples of this as well.

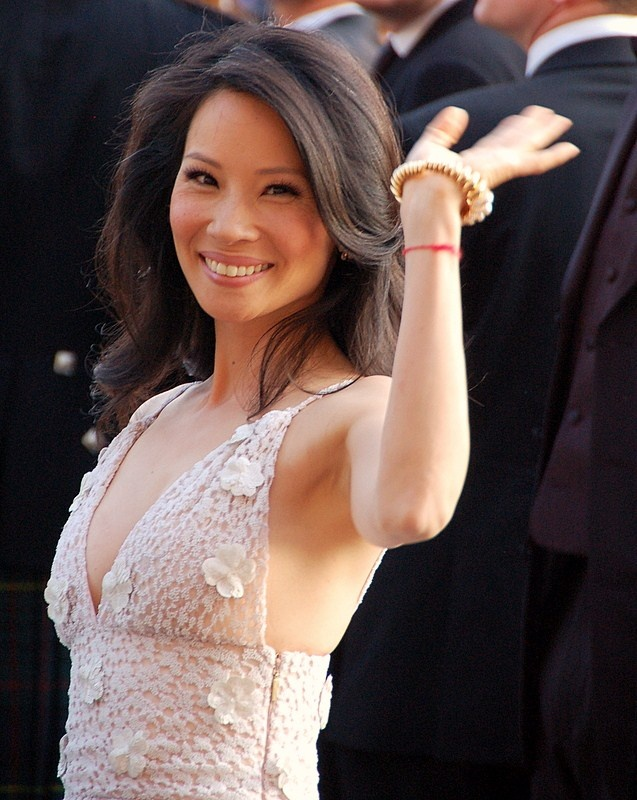
Actress Lucy Liu at the Cannes Film Festival in 2008

=== Modern usage (1990–present) ===
Contemporary actresses such as Michelle Yeoh in Tomorrow Never Dies may be constrained by the stereotype even when playing upstanding characters. These actresses portrayed characters whose actions are more masculine, sexually promiscuous, and violent. Lucy Liu is a 20th and 21st century example of the Hollywood use of the Dragon Lady image, becoming well known for her roles in Charlie's Angels, Kill Bill: Volume 1 and its sequel (2004), and Payback, playing spy- and assassin-type characters.

== Portrayal in Hollywood ==
Asian American women are constantly being portrayed as angry individuals in films and in the media. This portrayal ties into false narratives. The term "Yellow Peril" often ties into how the media is viewing Asian Americans to be angry and to continue using the term "Dragon Lady" against Asian American women. The "Yellow Peril" term has been used as a meme by the general public without respect to how Asian American women have become more traumatized in the media.

== Hollywood costuming ==
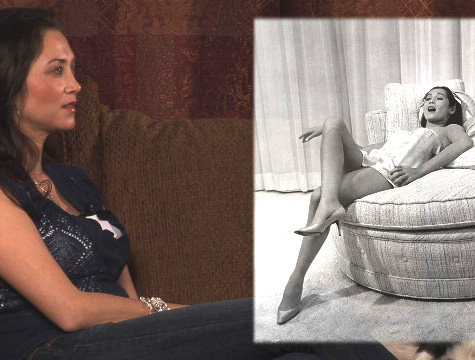
Nancy Kwan's costume in Flower Drum Song

Dragon Lady characters are visually defined by their emphasis on "otherness" and sexual promiscuity. An example of headwear for Dragon Lady costumes is the Hakka hat or other headdresses with eastern inspiration. For body wear, traditionally Dragon Ladies have been put in sexualized renditions of the cheongsam or kimono. Examples of this in The World of Suzie Wong include Nancy Kwan's character in a cheongsam that accentuates her hips and breasts.

=== Modern costuming ===
For modern-day Dragon Lady characters, much of costuming is closely linked to their archetypal characteristics and features. Bond girl Michelle Yeoh in Tomorrow Never Dies and Lucy Liu in Charlie's Angels both frequently wear tight-fitting black outfits in accordance with their characters' roles. In Kill Bill, Liu dons a kimono, harkening back to Dragon Ladies of past.

Asian women in the entertainment industry, such as Hollywood films, are often heavily sexualized. As a specific example states, “Doc Hata comments on the scene: I had never seen her move in such a way. I knew her body was like, of course, from when she was a young girl, and later, too, when’d swim or sunbathe at the house in a bikini, which was hardly a covering at all. She was always lithe and strong and sturdy-limbed, never too skinny or too softly feminine.” The sexualization can be seen with Asian American women having a much rounder body and bigger breasts than Asians.

== Relationship with other stereotypes ==
The "Dragon Lady" stereotype is most commonly presented in conjunction with, and in contrast to, that of the "Lotus Blossom", in portrayals, differentiated primarily through the moral codes of their characters. However, both tropes strongly emphasize the "otherness" of these characters in juxtaposition to their white counterparts, and their sexual relationships with white men in particular. The "Lotus Blossom" serves as a foil to the Dragon Lady, demure and submissive to her domineering and powerful. Both tropes are largely defined by their racial implications of sexuality, and desirability to the American audience.

The “Dragon Lady” stereotype is also portrayed through an emotional aspect in Hollywood film, especially towards men. An example is shown in Memoirs of a Geisha (2005) where Sayuri embodies the Lotus Blossom stereotype, which causes her emotions to be suppressed and subordinated into societal expectations, particularly in the needs of the male characters around her. The suppression Sayuri endures reflects the broader and historical expectations of Asian women to be passive and self-sacrificing.

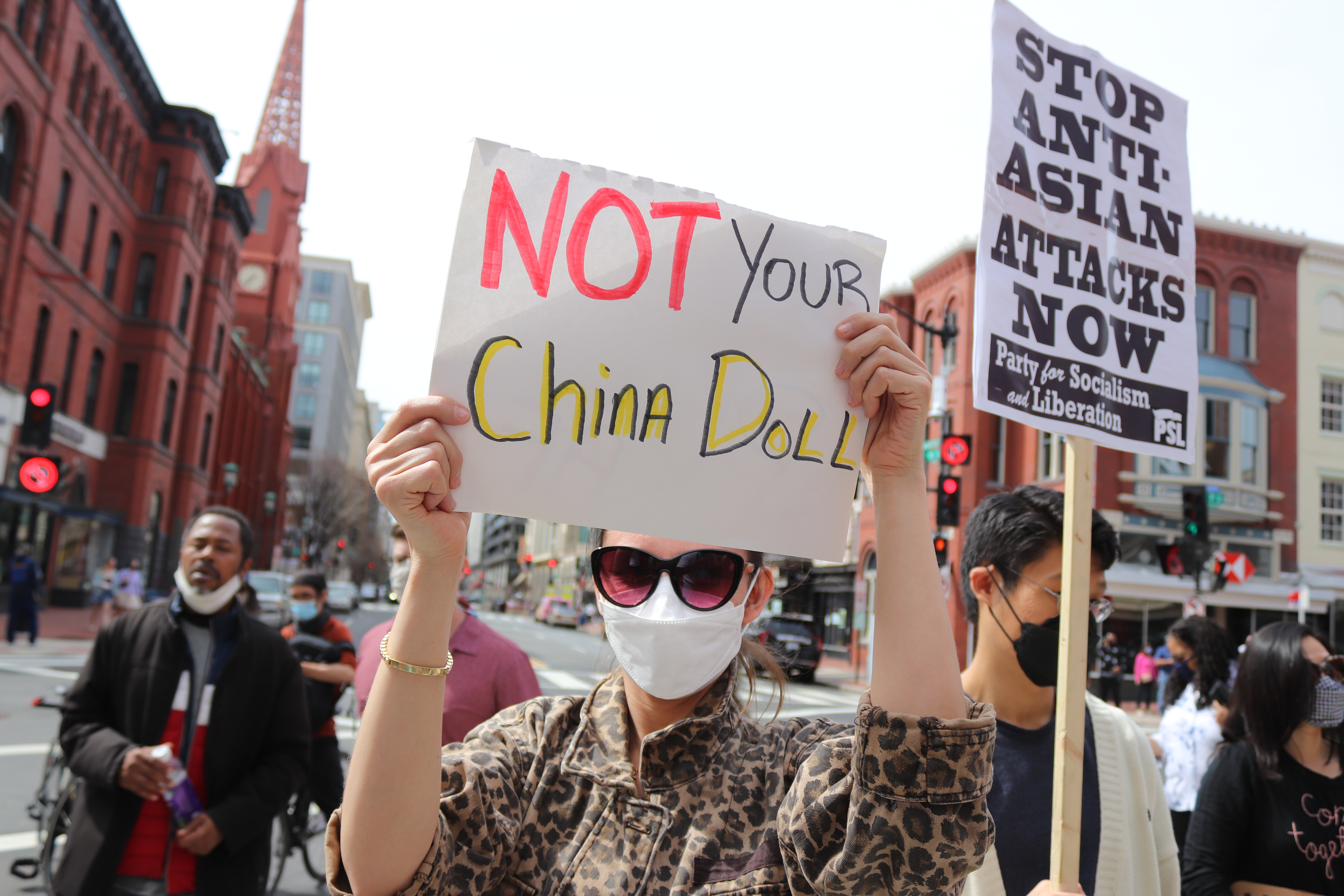
Sign at an anti-Asian violence event in Washington, D.C.

== Activist, academic, and critical response ==
The Dragon Lady stereotype has evoked significant conversation from critics and academics for its hyper-sexualization of Asian women and the impact on modern-day stereotypes and social issues. For example, one way the "Dragon Lady" and "Lotus Blossom" tropes have seen modern-day influence on the sexuality of Asian women is through pornography, where they are seen as more "submissive" and unlikely to take agency. Activists have called for a reclaiming of the sexual portrayal of Asian women, and point to the origins of these stereotypes and their desired effects to be rooted in anti-immigration and anti-miscegenation attitudes from the era of Chinese exclusion and the Page Act of 1875.

== See also ==
- Angry black woman
- Chun-Li
- Dragon Ladies: Asian American Feminists Breathe Fire
- Ethnic stereotype
- Ethnic stereotypes in comics
- Femme fatale
- Stereotypes of South Asians
- Tiger mother
- Xiaolongnü
