= List of Terry and the Pirates comic strips =

Milton Caniff's Terry and the Pirates promotional strip (October 21, 1934)

Terry and the Pirates is an American comic strip that originally ran from October 22, 1934, until February 25, 1973. The daily and Sunday strips ran separate storylines until August 25, 1936. A revival series (re-imagining the strip and setting it in the current day) ran from March 26, 1995, until July 27, 1997.

== Original series strips ==
=== Milton Caniff ===
Daily-Only Stories

- 001 - "The Lost Gold Mine" (10/22/34 to 1/25/35)
- 002 - "On a Mystery Cruise" (1/26/35 to 6/8/35)
- 003 - "Thugs and Lovers" (6/10/35 to 12/19/35)
- 004 - "St. Louis Blues on the Road to Mandalay" (12/20/35 to 4/23/36)
- 005 - "A Jewel of a Woman" (4/24/36 to 8/24/36)

Sunday-Only Stories

- 006 - "Enter the Dragon Lady" (12/9/34 to 3/10/35)
- 007 - "The Skull and the Dragon" (3/17/35 to 9/1/35)
- 008 - "Blaze and the Dragon" (9/8/35 to 1/26/36)
- 009 - "In Command" (2/2/36 to 8/23/36)

Combined Stories

- 010 - "Return of the Dragon Lady" (8/25/36 to 10/14/36)
- 011 - "Papa Pyzon" 10/15/36 to 2/4/37)
- 012 - "Sandhurst" (2/5/37 to 6/3/37)
- 013 - "On Trial" (6/4/37 to 9/9/37)
- 014 - "Burma's Return" (9/10/37 to 10/29/37)
- 015 - "Underwater Piracy" (10/30/37 to 12/19/37)
- 016 - "The Bandit General of the Guerilla War" (12/20/37 to 2/15/38)
- 017 - "The Duel" (2/16/38 to 4/3/38)
- 018 - "On the Road" (4/4/38 to 5/5/38)
- 019 - "War Profiteer" (5/6/38 to 7/10/38)
- 020 - "Papa Bountiful" (7/11/38 to 11/1/38)
- 021 - "In the Money" (11/2/38 to 12/8/38)
- 022 - "Shanghaied in Indo China" (12/9/38 to 2/26/39)
- 023 - "The Rescue of April Kane" (2/27/39 to 4/23/39)
- 024 - "The Dance" (4/24/39 to 7/2/39)
- 025 - "With the Guerillas" 7/3/39 to 9/9/39)
- 026 - "Siege" (9/10/39 to 11/4/39)
- 027 - "Wife Dealing and Gun Running" (11/5/39 to 3/9/40)
- 028 - "Babysitting" (3/10/40 to 6/7/40)
- 029 - "Prison Break" (6/8/40 to 9/1/40)
- 030 - "Ransom" (9/2/40 to 11/24/40)
- 031 - "Blue Tiger" (11/25/40 to 2/4/41)
- 032 - "Decoy" (2/5/41 to 4/27/41)
- 033 - "The Taste of Freedom" (4/28/41 to 6/22/41)
- 034 - "Raven Nevermore" (6/23/41 to 10/20/41)
- 035 - "Blackmail" (10/21/41 to 1/23/42)
- 036 - "Refugees" (1/24/42 to 3/29/42)
- 037 - "Normandie Meets the Dragon Lady" (3/30/42 to 6/12/42)
- 038 - "With the Air Corps" (6/13/42 to 8/21/42)
- 039 - "Terry the Spy" (8/22/42 to 12/19/42)
- 040 - "Flip Solo" (12/20/42 to 2/19/43)
- 041 - "Terry Joins Up" (2/20/43 to 3/21/43)
- 042 - "Escape" (3/22/43 to 5/16/43)
- 043 - "Amnesia" (5/17/43 to 8/29/43)
- 044 - "On the Wing" (8/30/43 to 10/29/43)
- 045 - "Jungle Rescue" (10/30/43 to 12/17/43)
- 046 - "The Fair Sex Revealed" (12/18/43 to 2/4/44)
- 047 - "Madame Shoo-Shoo" (2/5/44 to 5/19/44)
- 048 - "Jungle Monkeyshines" (5/20/44 to 7/24/44)
- 049 - "Honor Among Correspondents" (7/25/44 to 10/24/44)
- 050 - "Willow Kidnapped" (10/25/44 to 12/25/44)
- 051 - "The Dragon and the Snake" (12/26/44 to 4/3/45)
- 052 - "Back Among the Pirates" (4/4/45 to 5/18/45)
- 053 - "Marines to the Rescue" (5/19/45 to 9/2/45)
- 054 - "Wedding Bells" (9/3/45 to 11/5/45)
- 055 - "Forced Landing" (11/6/45 to 12/28/45)
- 056 - "Still the Traitor" (12/29/45 to 3/12/46)
- 057 - "Mustering the Post-War Crew" (3/13/46 to 5/17/46)
- 058 - "Unrequited Revenge" (5/18/46 to 7/16/46)
- 059 - "Nasty Trouble" (7/17/46 to 10/8/46)
- 060 - "Fanning Old Flames" (10/9/46 to 12/29/46)

=== George Wunder ===
- 061 - "Trouble in Tibet" (12/30/46 to 3/15/47)
- 062 - "Oil Hostage Crisis" (3/16/47 to 9/18/47)
- 063 - "Gun Running Frame-Up" (9/19/47 (to 2/5/48)
- 064 - "Ancient Greed" (2/6/48 to 8/30/48)
- 065 - "The Kidnapping of Chum Fun" (8/31/48 to 1/1/49)
- 066 - "The Bossy Blonde Baroness" (1/2/49 to 3/28/49)
- 067 - "Dame in Distress" (3/29/49 to 7/1/49)
- 068 - "Burgundy and the Bey" (7/2/49 to 9/18/49)
- 069 - "The Prisoner-Smuggling Underground" (9/19/49 to 1/3/50)
- 070 - "Jaws of Matrimony" (1/4/50 to 4/12/50)
- 071 - "The Gold Convoy" (4/13/50 to 7/3/50)
- 072 - "Texas Hospitality" (7/4/50 to 9/24/50)
- 073 - "The Rescue of Janus Janes" (9/25/50 to 1/11/51)
- 074 - "Re-enlisted" (1/12/51 to 2/28/51)
- 075 - "Hold-Out Behind Enemy Lines" (3/1/51 to 4/28/51)
- 076 - "All's Fair in Love and War" (4/29/51 to 7/3/51)
- 077 - "The Lin Report" (7/4/51 to 10/14/51)
- 078 - "Forced Combat" (10/15/51 to 12/30/51)
- 079 - "Black Market Blood" (12/21/51 to 4/24/52)
- 080 - "Kilocycle Kitty" (4/25/52 to 8/16/52)
- 081 - "Mistaken Identity" (8/17/52 to 11/29/52)
- 082 - "AWOL Agatha" (11/30/52 to 3/29/53)
- 083 - "Mosquito Outfit" (3/30/53 to 9/3/53)
- 084 - "Ransom" (9/4/53 to 12/8/53)
- 085 - "Behind the Bamboo Curtain" (12/9/53 to 3/28/54)
- 086 - "Something Blue" (3/29/54 to 5/28/54)
- 087 - "The General's Aide" (5/29/54 to 11/6/54)
- 088 - "The Defector" (11/7/54 to 3/28/55)
- 089 - "Operation Twice Fortunate Dragon" (3/29/55 to 7/10/55)
- 090 - "Operation Fall Guy" (7/11/55 to 10/31/55)
- 091 - "The Tower Contract Memo" (11/1/55 to 2/12/56)
- 092 - "Terry's Folly" (2/13/56 to 7/21/56)
- 093 - "The Secret Refueling System" (7/22/56 to 10/28/56)
- 094 - "Russian Guided Missile" (10/29/56 to 1/7/57)
- 095 - "Accused of Murder" (1/8/57 to 4/1/57)
- 096 - "Diplomatic Pressure" (4/2/57 to 7/7/57)
- 097 - "The Barracuda" (7/8/57 to 10/7/57)
- 098 - "The Red Deserter" (10/8/57 to 1/28/58)
- 099 - "The Sputnik in the Snow" (1/29/58 to 5/19/58)
- 100 - "The Anti-Lee Underground" (5/20/58 to 10/30/58)
- 101 - "Red Propaganda" (10/31/58 to 2/24/59)
- 102 - "The Mysterious Pryn Pasha" (2/25/59 to 7/6/59)
- 103 - "Escape to Freedom" (7/7/59 to 11/3/59)
- 104 - "The Scholar" (11/4/59 to 2/14/60)
- 105 - "Discoverer Deception" (2/15/60 to 6/5/60)
- 106 - "The Academy's Best and Brightest" (6/6/60 to 9/14/60)
- 107 - "Revenge" (9/15/60 to 12/24/60)
- 108 - "The Dragon Lady Cadet Corps" (12/25/60 to 6/18/61)
- 109 - "Finding One's Calling" (6/19/61 to 9/26/61)
- 110 - "Delphi Druid and the Russian Ballerina" (9/27/61 to 2/4/62)
- 111 - "The Date-Switching Wager" (2/5/62 to 4/4/62)
- 112 - "The Ghost of Morgan Le Fey" (4/5/62 to 6/11/62)
- 113 - "Raid on the Red Mining Compound" (6/12/62 to 10/21/62)
- 114 - "Red Ransom and Revenge" (10/22/62 to 2/17/63)
- 115 - "The Dragon Lady's Antique Forgery Racket" (2/18/63 to 6/29/63)
- 116 - "Bedcheck Charlie" (6/30/63 to 10/13/63)
- 117 - "Space Hypnosis" (10/14/63 to 12/23/63)
- 118 - "The Traitor" (12/24/63 to 3/8/64)
- 119 - "Coup in Latin America" (3/9/64 to 6/1/64)
- 120 - "Siamese Sabotage" (6/2/64 to 9/3/64)
- 121 - "Intrigue in India" (9/4/64 to 12/17/64)
- 122 - "Hanoi Hannah and the Red Dragon Spirit" (12/18/64 to 3/22/65)
- 123 - "Near East Pipeline Plot" (3/23/65 to 6/28/65)
- 124 - "La Rubia, Queen of Matadors" (6/29/65 to 10/22/65)
- 125 - "The 88th Republic of China Freedom Army" (10/23/65 to 1/28/66)
- 126 - "Shock Treatment" (1/29/66 to 6/12/66)
- 127 - "Dewey Dawn's Communist Clairvoyance" (6/13/66 to 9/5/66)
- 128 - "Our Hero" (9/6/66 to 1/22/67)
- 129 - "Nuclear Buzz-Bomb Threat" (1/23/67 to 5/17/67)
- 130 - "U.F.O. Hunting Expedition" (5/18/67 to 9/15/67)
- 131 - "Rescue Mission" (9/16/67 to 1/9/68)
- 132 - "Murder on Punter's Pride" (1/10/68 to 5/6/68)
- 133 - "The Art of Politics" (5/7/68 to 9/8/68)
- 134 - "The Devil's Players" (9/9/68 to 12/5/68)
- 135 - "Belisarius' Pledge of Honor" (12/6/68 to 3/25/69)
- 136 - "Subversion in the Near East" (3/26/69 to 7/8/69)
- 137 - "Sins of the Brother" (7/9/69 to 10/12/69)
- 138 - "The Field Grey Ghost" (10/13/69 to 1/5/70)
- 139 - "Hijacked" (1/6/70 to 6/1/70)
- 140 - "Death and Desecration in the Desert" (6/2/70 to 9/18/70)
- 141 - "Power to the People" (9/19/70 to 11/2/70)
- 142 - "The Decoy" (11/3/70 to 12/27/70)
- 143 - "Harridge's House of Horror" (12/28/70 to 2/10/71)
- 144 - "Coup D'Etat" (2/11/71 to 4/4/71)
- 145 - "Twelve Oar Bay" (4/5/71 to 5/15/71)
- 146 - "The Living Saint of Serendip" (5/16/71 to 6/19/71)
- 147 - "Theatrical Fraud" (6/20/71 to 7/24/71)
- 148 - "The Final Flight of the Mother Goose" (7/25/71 to 9/3/71)
- 149 - "Puppy Love" (9/4/71 to 10/30/71)
- 150 - "The Nation's First Dictator" (10/31/71 to 12/13/71)
- 151 - "Congress of Imposters" (12/14/71 to 2/28/72)
- 152 - "Run For the Border" (2/29/72 to 5/21/72)
- 153 - "Private War" (5/22/72 to 7/24/72)
- 154 - "V.I.P. Under the Gun" (7/25/72 to 9/27/72)
- 155 - "Bad Trip Experiment" (9/28/72 to 12/24/72)
- 156 - "Contraband" (12/25/72 to 2/25/73)

== Revival Series strips ==
=== Art: Greg and Tim Hildebrandt - Writing: Michael Uslan ===
- R01 - "Enter the Dragon Lady" (3/26/95 to 5/4/95)
- R02 - "Papa Python" (5/5/95 to 6/18/95)
- R03 - "Pirated Plutonium" (6/19/95 to 9/24/95)
- R04 - "Satellite Pirates" (9/25/95 to 12/31/95)
- R05 - "The Trial of the Dragon Lady" (1/1/96 to 3/31/96)

=== Art: Dan Spiegle - Writing: Jim Clark ===
- R06 - "A Fortune in Jade" (4/1/96 to 7/11/96)
- R07 - "Treasure Hunt" (7/12/96 to 11/18/96)
- R08 - "Justice" (11/19/96 to 1/10/97)
- R09 - "Search For the Missing Munitions" (1/11/97 to 4/25/97)
- R10 - "Nuclear Auction" (4/26/97 to 6/22/97)
- R11 - "The Corrupt Politician" (6/23/97 to 7/27/97)

== Sources ==
This information was compiled by consulting all of the original strips published in newspapers between 1934 and 1997. The story titles for the Milton Caniff stories (stories 001 to 060) were taken from Carl Horak's Terry and the Pirates Companion.
