= Kelvin Keech =

American actor, producer and radio announcer

- Born: Kelvin Kirkwood Keech; June 28, 1895; Honolulu, Republic of Hawaii
- Died: May 22, 1977 (aged 81); Jackson Heights, Queens, New York, U.S.
- Spouse: Marie Keech
- Presenting career
- Show: The Eveready Hour; The Fuller Brush Man; Bill and Betty; Popeye the Sailor; Terry and the Pirates
- Stations: 2LO, London
- Network: NBC
- Stations: WEAF, New York City
- Country: United Kingdom; United States

Kelvin Kirkwood Keech (June 28, 1895 – May 22, 1977) was an American actor, producer and old-time radio announcer.

Keech was known for being the announcer for several popular old-time radio programs including The Eveready Hour, Bill and Betty, Popeye the Sailor and Terry and the Pirates.

Keech was also known for remaking and redistributing the banjolele with his brother Alvin Keech in 1917.

== Early life ==
Kelvin Kirkwood Keech was born on June 28, 1895, in Honolulu, Republic of Hawaii to parents Alvin Welty Keech and Isabella Keech (née Weir). He had an elder brother Alvin Danglada Keech (1890 - May 22, 1948) who was also an expert banjo player. Kelvin Keech went to and graduated from Franklin & Marshall College in Lancaster, Pennsylvania, before concluding his studies in Boston.

== Career ==
=== The Keech Studios ===
In 1915, the Keech brothers founded The Keech Studios which was located at 435 Powell Street in San Francisco, California. The studio was responsible for the signing of employees to the Hawaiian company Matson, Inc., organizing concerts in California, tours in the Midwest and even manufacture.

=== World War I career and Europe ===
Keech served in the United States Army Signal Corps during World War I. Keech was a radio engineer in France. Keech was wounded in action in September 1918 and while recovering at the American Hospital in Neuilly-sur-Seine, France, Keech met Bill Henley and after Keech was discharged from the hospital, the two formed a jazz orchestra band entitled "The White Lyres". The group traveled throughout various parts of France and neighboring countries.

In April 1919, Keech moved to Paris where he showed off his banjo playing skills. The White Lyres performed at the Savoy Dancing Club and had a two-month engagement at the London branch of the Ciro's nightclub from October–December 1919. While in London in the 1920s, Keech befriended the at that time Prince of Wales Edward Windsor and even taught him to play the ukulele.

=== The Banjolele ===
In 1916, San Francisco resident John A. Bolander patented the first banjolele. The banjolele was a four-stringed musical instrument with a small banjo-type body and also had a fretted ukulele neck. In 1922 after Alvin joined Keech in Paris, the brothers distributed, made and sold several variations of what would become known as Keech Banjoleles. The instrument was very popular in Europe, specifically France, Italy and England, and even were sold in parts of Hawaii and Dallas. The Keech brothers along with their studios ceased manufacturing the banjoleles in 1939. The instrument itself has sharply declined in popularity however, several manufacturing companies in the United States that make the banjolele still exist.

=== Radio ===
Keech's career in radio began in the mid-1920s on 2LO, a syndicate of the British Broadcasting Company. Keech was a performer on various programs of the station. Keech could usually be found playing either the ukulele or the banjo when he performed on radio. He performed on 2LO for several years before he moved back to the United States in 1928. After announcing roles on several radio programs, he earned an audition for the NBC affiliate WEAF in New York. Despite numerous roles on the radio, Keech caught a case of mike fright. However, a second audition several weeks later earned Keech a spot on NBC's board of announcers.

Keech was most noted for announcing The Eveready Hour, Bill and Betty, Popeye the Sailor and Terry and the Pirates all on NBC during the 1920s, 1930s and 1940s.

== Personal life ==
In the historic city of Constantinople, Keech met his future wife Marie. Marie was born in Russia in 1896 and did not understand a word of English and at the same time Keech did not know a word of Russian. The two fell in love and were married. The two had no children.

Keech died on May 22, 1977, in Jackson Heights, Queens, New York at the age of 81. Keech is buried with his wife in Roslyn Cemetery in Roslyn, New York. Marie preceded Kelvin in death by 4 years.

== Filmography ==
=== Radio ===
- The Eveready Hour
- Fuller Brush Man
- Fireside Recitals
- Twenty Thousand Years in Sing Sing
- Heart Throbs of the Hills
- Bill and Betty
- Popeye the Sailor
- Terry and the Pirates

=== Film ===
- Alvin and Kelvin Keech (1926) himself; short film made in Phonofilm sound-on-film process
- Stephen Foster (1933) announcer
- On the Air and Off (1933) himself; short film

== Bibliography ==
- A Standard Method and Self-instructor on the Ukulele (1914)
- The Keech Banjulele and Ukulele Tutor by the Keech Brothers with Alvin D. Keech (1922)
