= Aleko Lilius =

Explorer, businessman, diplomat, writer, journalist, and photographer

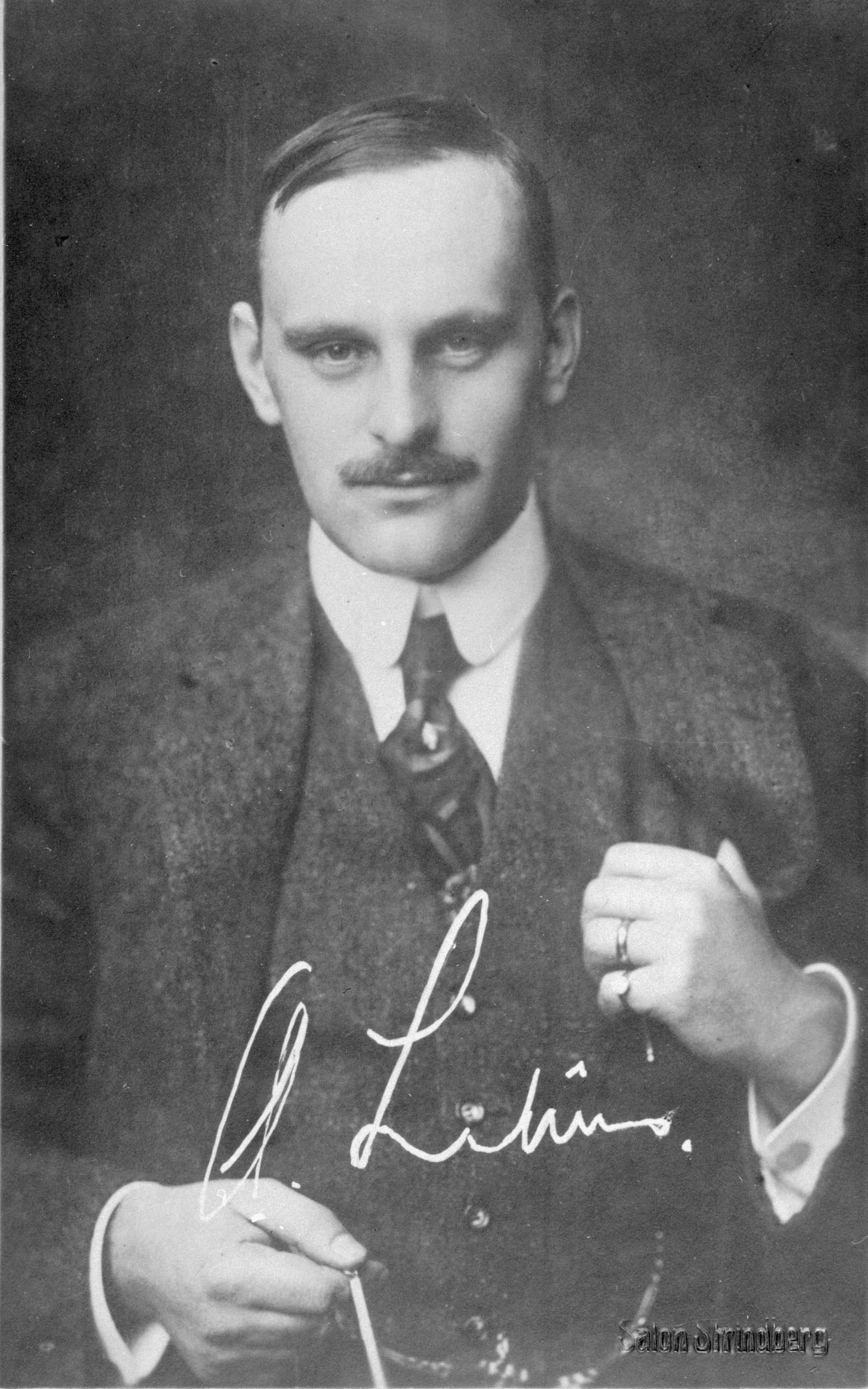
- Born: Aleko Axel August Eugen Lilius; 2 April 1890; Helsinki, Finland
- Died: 24 June 1977 (aged 87); Helsinki, Finland
- Notable work: I Sailed with Chinese Pirates (1931)

Aleko Axel August Eugen Lilius (2 April 1890 – 24 June 1977) was an explorer, businessman, diplomat, writer, journalist, and photographer of Finnish, Swedish, and Russian extraction. He has been described as an English journalist, a Russian Finn, an American of Finnish origin, a Swedish journalist and adventurer, and an intrepid American journalist. He is the author of I Sailed with Chinese Pirates, an account of the time he spent among pirates of the South China seas.

== Biography ==
Lilius was born in Saint Petersburg, Russia, on 2 April 1890. His father was a senior translator for the Senate of Finland and served as a staff captain in the Izmaylovsky Regiment. His mother was Natalia Starck who was born in the Caucasus and was the daughter of major general Julius Starck.

Before World War I, Lilius was a businessman whose exploits attracted much publicity. In 1916, Lilius was the highest taxed private individual in Finland as a private banker who owned the Privatbanken I Helsingfors.

As a young man, he explored much of the Americas, China, North Africa, and South Africa, before settling down for a while in the Philippines. Lilius' writing was based on his wide-ranging travels in places such as China, Morocco, and Mexico. The first mention of Lilius as a writer is as the author of the script for the 1919 Finnish film Venusta etsimässä eli erään nuoren miehen ihmeelliset seikkailut (In Search of Venus or The Marvelous Adventures of a Young Man). In China in 1927, he rescued the remnants of the American flag from the looted American consulate in Nanking. While in the Philippines, he participated in a project to photograph the Bugkalot tribe. During the 1920s and 1930s, Lilius worked as a foreign correspondent in Asia and North Africa. During the 1920s, he worked with linguist Rudolf Schuller as a photographer in Mexico. In the 1930s, Lilius lived in the United States, residing in the Armour–Stiner Octagon House in Irvington, New York.

He ran into conflict with the law several times in the 1930s. According to an article in the Singaporean The Straits Times, Lilius was convicted of fraud and "sentenced to two months hard labour" in 1929. Four years later while in the Philippines, he was again pronounced guilty of fraud for issuing four checks with insufficient funds and was sentenced to one year and one day in prison plus required to pay what he owed. Lilius appealed to a higher court for a reversal of the lower court's decision; his appeal was successful and the charges were reversed.

Lilius sued a Philippine railroad company after the car in which he and has family were traveling was hit by a locomotive in 1931. Although he won the suit in a lower court, the railroad company appealed to the Supreme Court. Lilius again succeeded and was awarded P30,865.

In the 1950s he lived in Morocco. In 1958 he moved to Helsinki, Finland, and later devoted himself to painting. Lilius died on 24 June 1977 in Helsinki, Finland.

== Works ==
=== I Sailed with Chinese Pirates ===
Lilius is primarily remembered as the author of I Sailed with Chinese Pirates, an account of the time he spent among the pirates of the South China seas. The original review in The New York Times (27 July 1931) reads in part:

A meeting with a mysterious woman pirate chief, Lai Choi San, with several thousand ruthless buccaneers under command ... Aleko E. Lilius, English journalist, while traveling in the Orient, according to the publishers, succeeded in winning the confidence of this unusual woman, and he accompanied her and some of her desperadoes on one of their expeditions on a junk equipped with cannon ... the only white man who has ever sailed with these pirates

Lai Choi San is widely believed to be the source of inspiration for the character of the Dragon Lady, the oriental femme fatale in Milton Caniff"s comic strip Terry and the Pirates. Lilius referred to Lai Choi San as Queen of the Pirates rather than Dragon Lady, but Caniff did use the Chinese name for his character. According to one source, this was the cause of a later legal dispute between Lilius and the syndicate that produced the comic strip.

== Partial bibliography ==
- (1919) Herr C.G's politiska affärer (Mr. C G's Political Affairs)
- (1920s) Extensive photography for the Rudolf Schuller Papers. These papers consist of field notes, vocabulary lists, manuscripts, and photos from Schuller's studies of a variety of Mexican and Central American Indian languages and dialects, with particular emphasis on the culture and language of the Huastecan Indians. The collection is now in the hands of the Middle American Research Institute of Tulane University.
- (1928) Min kinesiska Krigsbok (My Chinese War Diary). Publisher: Hökerbergs
- (1931) Lilius, Aleko E. (1931). I Sailed with Chinese Pirates. New York: D. Appleton & Co.
- (1948) The Romantic Thousand Islands, Their Towns and Times. Publisher: Holliday Publications Ltd., Canada.
- (1956) Lilius, Aleko E. (1956). Turbulent Tangier. London: Elek Books. ISBN 9789881815446. OCLC 28756841.
- (1956) Ung man i farten (Memoirs: A Young Man's Journey)
- (1957) Ett herrans liv (Memoirs: A Gentleman's Life)
- (1962) The Romantic Thousand Islands: Photographs – Maps – History. Publisher: Wallace
- Lilius also published a number of free-lance articles in magazines such as Argosy (UK) (May 1947), Stag (Feb 1952), Adventure Magazine (Jan 1953), The Wide World (Sep 1930, Publisher: George Newnes Ltd, London); and The Sphere Illustrated Newspaper (London) (4 July 1931), which was "a brief sketch of the Sultan of Sulu, courted by the U.S. in an effort to defuse Moro hostility during its governance of the Philippines"; and (1964) The Sultan of Sulu tells how England 'stole' North Borneo.
- (1991) Lilius, Aleko E. (1991). I Sailed with Chinese Pirates. Hong Kong: Oxford University Press reprint. ISBN 0-19-585297-4.
