= Armour–Stiner House =

Mansion in Irvington, New York

- U.S. National Register of Historic Places
- U.S. National Historic Landmark
- New York State Register of Historic Places
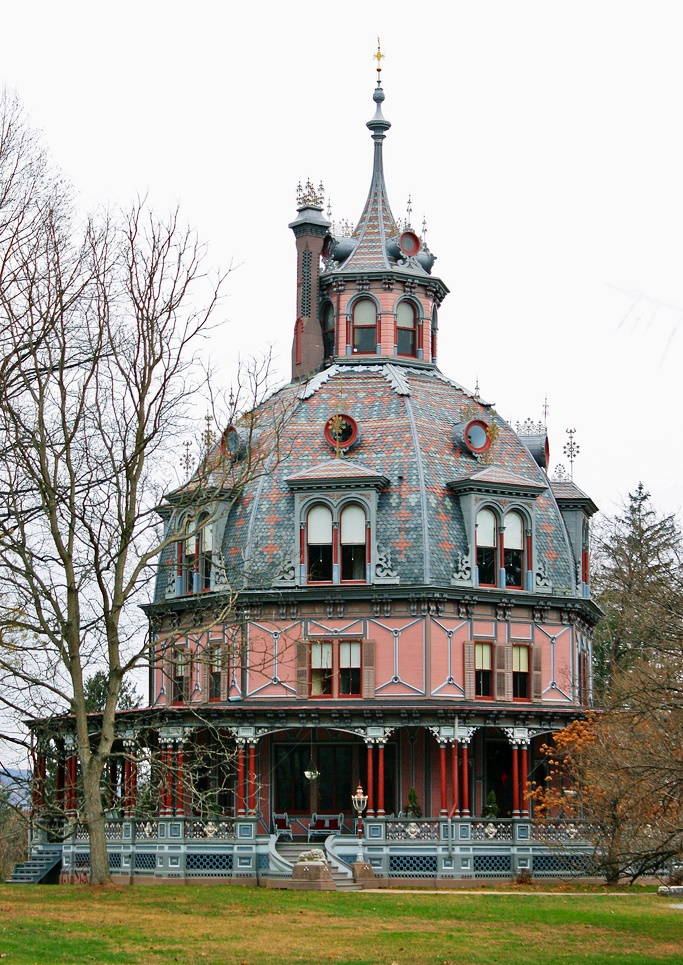
- (2009)

- Location within New York
- Interactive map showing the location of Armour-Stiner House
- Location: 45 W. Clinton Ave., Irvington, NY
- Coordinates: 41°1′51″N 73°52′14″W
- Built: 1860
- Architectural style: Eclectic: Octagon Mode
- NRHP reference No.: 75001238
- NYSRHP No.: 11956.000156

Significant dates
- Added to NRHP: December 18, 1975
- Designated NHL: December 8, 1976
- Designated NYSRHP: June 23, 19890

The Armour–Stiner House is an octagon-shaped and domed Victorian-style house located at 45 West Clinton Avenue in Irvington, in Westchester County, New York. It was designated a National Historic Landmark in 1976. It is the only known fully domed octagonal residence. The house was modeled after Donato Bramante’s 1502 Tempietto in Rome, which in turn was based on a Tholos, a type of ancient classical temple.

The house was built in 1859–1860 by financier Paul J. Armour based on the architectural ideas of Orson Squire Fowler, the author of The Octagon House: A Home for All Occasions. Fowler believed that octagonal houses enclosed more space, provided more interior sunlight, and that its rooms were easily accessible to each other. Fowler's ideas gained significant traction in the mid-to-late 19th century. The architect of the house is unknown. It is the only known octagonal house based on the domed colonnade shape of a Roman temple. The dome was added and the house was enlarged during 1872–1876 by Joseph Stiner, who was a tea importer. The Armour–Stiner House is said to be one of the most lavish octagon houses built in the period, and is now one of only perhaps a hundred still extant.

In the 1930s, the house was owned by Aleko E. E. Lilius, a Finnish writer and explorer, and from 1946 to 1976 by historian Carl Carmer, who maintained that the house was haunted. In 1976, the house was briefly owned by the National Trust for Historic Preservation to prevent it from being demolished. The Trust was unable to fund the amount of renovation the property required, and sold it to the preservationist architect, Joseph Pell Lombardi, who has conserved and renovated the house, interiors, grounds, and outbuildings.

The house remains a private residence. It is located on the south side of West Clinton Avenue, on the crest of a hill overlooking the Hudson River, to the west. It is about 1650 feet from the river, and about 140 feet above it, consistent with Fowler's siting ideas. The Old Croton Aqueduct, another National Historic Landmark, abuts the property on the east.

In September 2017, Lombardi offered the house for rent through Sotheby's, for $40,000 a month.

== Description ==
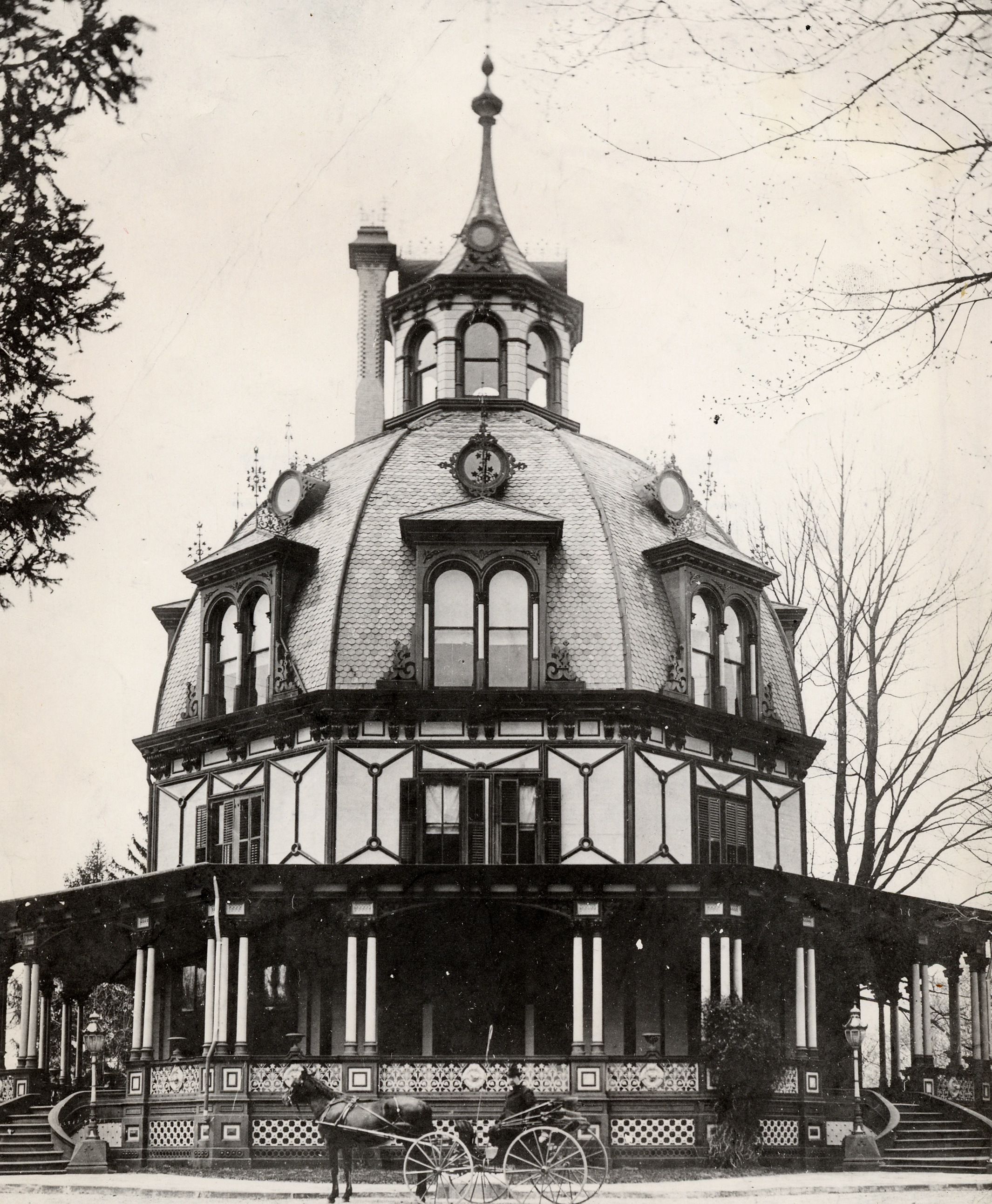
The Armour-Stiner Octagon House, 1882

The four-story house, plus an observatory, encompasses 8,400 square feet (780 m^{2}). The complex includes a barn, a carriage house, a well house used as a gazebo, and the original Lord & Burnham conservatory greenhouse. The house's main floor is surrounded by a veranda decorated with carved wooden gingerbread detailing and lit with gas lamps. The interior of the house includes an entrance hall, a solarium, a library, a curio room, a music room in the Egyptian Revival style, a 360-degree "dance room" added by Stiner, a billiard room, a wine cellar, seven bedrooms and three bathrooms, two kitchens and a pantry.

== Guided tours ==
In April 2019, the Armour-Stiner (Octagon) House opened its doors for guided tours by appointment. Reservations can be made through its website.

== In popular culture ==
- The house is the main setting for the 1981 horror film The Nesting.
- The house is featured in Tony Millionaire's Sock Monkey Volume 4, #2 (2003), reprinted in The Collected Works of Tony Millionaire's Sock Monkey.
- An exterior shot of the home was used in the film, Across the Universe. The Octagon House is seen briefly after the "Magical Mystery Tour" bus arrives in a wooded area. It is first depicted in psychedelic colors and then with a moat surrounding it. The building is described by Bono (playing "Dr. Robert") as the "Headquarters of the League of Spiritual Deliverance", the home of Dr. Geary (an allusion to Dr. Timothy Leary).

== See also ==
- List of National Historic Landmarks in New York
- National Register of Historic Places listings in southern Westchester County, New York
