= George Wunder =

American cartoonist

- Born: April 24, 1912 New York City, New York
- Died: December 13, 1987 (aged 75) New Milford, Connecticut
- Areas: Cartoonist, Writer, Artist, Inker
- Notable works: Terry and the Pirates
- Awards: United States Air Force Exceptional Service Award, 1963; National Cartoonists Society's Silver T-Square Award, 1970

George S. Wunder (April 24, 1912 – December 13, 1987) was an American cartoonist best known for his 26 years illustrating the Terry and the Pirates comic strip.

Born in Manhattan, Wunder grew up in Kingston, New York. As a youth, he planned a career as a professional comics artist. Other than correspondence courses, including the International Correspondence School art course, he was a self-taught artist. At the age of 24, he began as a staff artist at the Associated Press, where he worked alongside illustrator Noel Sickles and sports cartoonist Tom Paprocki. At AP, Wunder illustrated fiction and various editorial cartoon features, such as "Can Hitler Beat the Russian Jinx?"

During World War II, he served in the Army from 1942 to 1946. Returning to the Associated Press after World War II, he drew the strip See for Yourself in 1946 for AP Newsfeatures.

== Terry and the Pirates ==
In 1946, when Milton Caniff left Terry and the Pirates, there were about 100 artists who applied for the job, according to Caniff. Wunder submitted samples, and the Tribune-News Syndicate chose Wunder as Caniff's replacement (with former Caniff assistant Lee Elias a close runner-up). Wunder's first Terry and the Pirates appeared in newspapers on December 30, 1946, launching the story "Trouble in Tibet". Comics historian Don Markstein noted the transition:

Terry was left in the hands of George Wunder, a skilled cartoonist who maintained a high level of quality. But Caniff was a unique talent, and nobody could ever truly replace him. Terry Lee had joined the U.S. Air Force during World War II. Wunder left him there, and let him mature fully as an Air Force officer. During the Vietnam Era, military-oriented entertainment declined in popularity. The strip was discontinued in 1973. By that time, Wunder, too, had stopped doing it — although it still bore his byline, it was ghosted by Al Plastino, better known for his work on Superman. (Plastino was also handling the pantomime strip Ferd'nand, and later became Ernie Bushmiller's assistant on Nancy.)

Initially, Wunder drew the strip so it was similar to that of Caniff and Sickles, but he soon developed his own distinctive style. Hotshot Charlie, for example, was drawn in a more openly humorous manner than before. In 1953, Canada Dry offered a "premium giveaway" with a case of its ginger ale — one minibook in a trilogy series of Terry and the Pirates strips by Wunder, printed by Harvey Comics. Throughout the 1950s, the Sunday pages used color for psychological effect. One Wunder panel from that period has no blue or green shadows as one might expect; the panel was colored only with orange, red and yellow. In another, Terry is colored green in front, and his back is a yellow-orange. Wunder drew dramatic and highly detailed pictures, but comics historian Maurice Horn claimed it was difficult to tell one character from another and wrote that Wunder's stories lacked Caniff's essential humor. At the end of the 1950s, Hotshot Charlie was dropped from the strip, which was drawn and colored in a more sedate manner with careful attention to the airplanes flown by Terry Lee and his friends.

Writer-artist Bill Pearson noted that Wunder spent "decades producing a very solid adventure strip. He drew ugly people, even young women, which was certainly a curious trait, but he was one of the very best inkers in the business. His technique was flawless." With his clean and precise inking style, Wunder filled his panels with numerous foreground and background details, as landscape painter Bob Foster observed:

I read Wunder's Terry when I was a kid and even then was impressed by all the work he put into it. Every single panel was fully loaded with detailed backgrounds and detailed wrinkles, costumes and hairs, even on all the characters in the background, all the woodgrain in all the wood, and all those black shadows that lent an air of foreboding to each panel. I could never get over his 3/4 rear view of a character's eyeball straining to see something behind him. And all those overly bridged noses on both guys and gals all crying out for rhinoplasty. For many years I resented the overloaded panels and decided I didn't like Wunder's rendering of Terry and the Pirates. It was only in the last few years that I came to appreciate Wunder's work on Terry. One day I realized that he never cheated. He gave us everything in infinite detail in every panel and never deprived us of any wrinkles, bricks, tiles, leaves, woodgrain, fingernails, hairs, cloth patterns or buttons. Yeah, the look-alike facial features of all his characters in the later years of Terry was stylistic and bothersome, but he never cheated.

== Assistants ==
In mid 1962 former EC Comics and Classics Illustrated artist George Evans came on board as Wunder's assistant on the daily strip. As Evans related in an interview in The Comics Journal #177 (May 1995), "George would lay out the strip, pencil and ink the characters' heads, and I would finish the strip." Evans said that during these years Wunder did the Sunday pages all himself. In the same interview he told how he had drawn a daily strip where a general's uniform varied from the way Wunder drew the character in the Sunday for that week, necessitating re-drawing parts of the Sunday. Evans offered to help, but Wunder wouldn't let him saying, "It wasn't your mistake." Then he dug out his electric eraser and went to work on the Sunday. Evans worked on the strip until it was cancelled in 1973. Other artists who stepped in to assist Wunder included Lee Elias, Russ Heath, Fred Kida, Don Sherwood, Frank Springer and Wally Wood.

== Retirement ==
The strip was being carried in 100 newspapers when Wunder retired in 1973. The New York Daily News ran every Terry and the Pirates daily and Sunday except for the final three weeks by Wunder in 1973. At the time of his retirement, Wunder commented:

It's a strip I've enjoyed doing, but on the other hand, it has been, oh, a chore. The sheer mechanics of producing that much work week in and week out ties you down... Taste in strips seems to be changing. People just don't seem to follow continuity strips any more the way they used to. They get an average of three to four complete stories a night off the boob tube. There's no reason why they should hang around anywhere from eight to 12 weeks to find out just how one story came out."

When Wunder, who lived in Sherman, Connecticut, announced his retirement, the syndicate chose to cancel the strip on February 25, 1973. Wunder regarded the cancellation as a Vietnam War casualty, commenting, "The fighter pilot is no longer the glamorous, reckless defender of the free world against all comers. He's now the cold-blooded professional dropping napalm on women and children."

== Death ==
George Wunder's Terry and the Pirates (August 17, 1968). To read the dialogue in this strip, go to Thrilling Adventures.

Wunder died of a heart attack in the New Milford Hospital on Sunday, December 13, 1987, survived by his wife, Mildred, and his sister, Beatrice Bogert of Riverdale, New Jersey. At age 87, Mildred "Millie" A. Wunder (née Smith), who was known as "Mrs. Terry and the Pirates," died March 1, 2001, in Port St. Lucie, Florida after a short illness.

== Our Guest Star ==
Wunder's Our Guest Star was a 1955 promotional strip featuring characters from Terry and the Pirates with cameo appearances by film stars and other celebrities.

- January 27, 1955 (features Mary Martin)
- April 19, 1955 (features Grace Kelly)
- October 28, 1955 (features Robert Cummings)
- December 29, 1955 (features Charlton Heston)

== Awards ==
Wunder was a member of the Illustrators Club and the National Cartoonists Society. On June 11, 1963, he was honored by the United States Air Force with their Exceptional Service Award. In 1970, he received the National Cartoonists Society's Silver T-Square Award.

== See also ==
- Titles of George Wunder's 95 Terry and the Pirates stories from 1946 ("Trouble in Tibet") to 1973 ("Contraband")
