= Michael Lally (poet) =

American poet

- Born: May 25, 1942 (age 84); Orange, New Jersey
- Occupations: Poet, Playwright, Actor

Michael Lally (born May 25, 1942) is an American-born poet and the author of more than 30 books of poetry. He is considered part of the New York School of poetry, which began in the early 1950s and is acknowledged as one of the most influential movements of American poetry. He counts among his major influences the poets Frank O'Hara and William Carlos Williams, as well as writer William Saroyan.

== Biography ==
=== Early years ===
Lally was born in Orange, New Jersey, the youngest of seven in an Irish-American family of policemen, priests, and politicians, and raised in South Orange, New Jersey. His autobiographical style of poetry and prose reflects on American culture from the 1950s forward: civil rights, gay rights, women's rights and anti-war movements and his active participation in each.

Lally started out playing piano and reading his poetry in coffeehouses and bars in 1959. In 1962 he joined the United States Air Force, where he spent more than four years as an enlisted man, and later used the G.I. Bill to attend the University of Iowa Writers' Workshop. In the Fall of 1968, while living in Iowa, Lally actively campaigned for the position of Johnson County Sheriff as part of the Peace and Freedom Party ticket.

=== Writing career ===
In 1972 he wrote the autobiographical South Orange Sonnets which received a New York Poetry Center Discovery Award.

=== Acting career ===
He moved from New York to Los Angeles in 1982 and acted in movies and TV (as Michael David Lally), mostly as a bad guy and the occasional good guy. He was seen in films including Basic Instinct (1992), White Fang (1991) and Cool World (1992), as well as on TV as Captain Bubb in Deadwood (2004), Walter Hoyt on NYPD Blue (1995–97) and Detective Frank Costa on JAG (1997–98). His writing found its way into several movies including .

=== Personal life ===
Lally has been married three times. His first wife was Carol Lee Fisher from 1964 to 1979. His second wife was Penelope Milford from 1982 to 1984. He then wed a third time to Jaina Flynn in 1997 before separating in 2003. Lally has three children: Caitlin, Miles and Flynn.

== Bibliography ==
=== Books ===
- What Withers (poetry, Doones Press, 1970)
- "MCMLXVI Poem" (poem, The Nomad Press, 1970)
- The Lines Are Drawn (poetry, Asphalt Press, 1970)
- Stupid Rabbits (poetry, Morgan Press, 1971)
- The South Orange Sonnets (poetry, Some Of Us Press, 1972)
- "Late Sleepers" (poem, Pellet Press, 1973)
- Malenkov Takes Over (poetry/collage, A Dry Imager Production, 1974)
- Rocky Dies Yellow (poetry, Blue Wind Press, 1975)
- Mentally, He's a Sick Man (prose, Salt Lick Press, 1975)
- Dues (poetry, The Stonewall Press, 1975)
- My Life (poetry, Wyrd Press, 1975)
- Sex/The Swing Era (poetry, Lucy & Ethel, 1975)
- Oomaloom (prose, A Dry Imager Production, 1975)
- Charisma (poetry, O Press, 1976)
- "In the Mood" (poem, Titanic Books, 1978)
- Catch My Breath (poetry and prose, Salt Lick Press, 1978)
- Just Let Me Do It (poetry, Vehicle Editions, 1978)
- White Life (poetry, Jordan Davies, 1980)
- Hollywood Magic (poetry, Little Caesar, 1982)
- Attitude (poetry, Hanging Loose Press, 1982)
- What You Find There (poetry compact disc, New Alliance Records, 1994)
- Cant Be Wrong (poetry, Coffee House Press, 1996)
- It's Not Nostalgia: Poetry & Prose (Black Sparrow Press, 1999)
- Of (book-length poem, Quiet Lion Press, 1999)
- ¿Que Pasa, Baby? (prose poem, Wake Up Heavy Press, 2001)
- It Takes One to Know One: Poetry & Prose (Black Sparrow Press, 2001)
- March 18, 2003 (book-length poem with illustrations by Alex Katz, Libellum, 2004)
- Swing Theory (Hanging Loose Press, May 15, 2015)
- Another Way to Play (Seven Stories Press, April 19, 2018)
- Say It Again (Beltway Editions, 2024)

=== Plays ===
- Four Grown Men, The Ear of the Dog Poets Theater Festival, 1982, New York, NY
- Hollywood Magic, Stages Theater, 1983, Hollywood, CA 1983
- The Rhythm of Torn Stars, 1988, The Pacific Theater, Venice CA (co-wrote)
- Chicks: A Spiritual Quest, 1995, 321 Broadway, Santa Monica, CA

=== Film ===
- Co-authored Fogbound (with Ate De Jong), which was a finalist at the 2003 Hollywood Film Festival and winner of the 2003 Best Feature Film award at the 5th International Panorama of Independent Filmmakers Festival in Thessaloniki, Greece.
- Contributed to many screenplays including Drugstore Cowboy, Pump Up The Volume, The Laureate, and many more.

=== Notable awards ===
- The New York 92nd St. YMHA Poetry Center Discovery Award, 1972
- The Poets Foundation Award, 1974
- National Endowment for the Arts Poetry Fellowship, 1974 and 1981
- The Pacificus Foundation Literary Award, 1996
- PEN Josephine Miles Award for Excellence in Literature, 1997
- American Book Award, 2000
