= Dragon Lady (Terry and the Pirates) =

Fictional character from Terry and the Pirates

Milton Caniff's Terry and the Pirates (September 27, 1936).

The Dragon Lady, also known as Madam Deal, was a well-known character in the U.S. comic strip Terry and the Pirates, created by Milton Caniff, and in the movie serial, comic books, and TV series based on the comic strip. She was inspired and modeled after Lai Choi San, a real-life 20th century pirate, while her early physical appearance was taken from actress Joan Crawford.

== Origin ==
The Dragon Lady first appeared in December 1934, in the first Sunday strip story. She began as a stereotypically beautiful, seductive and evil Asian, but as the comic strip became more realistic, the character grew more complex. Fans of the strip recall her passionate love for the journalist and man-of-action Pat Ryan, and the time she taught Terry how to dance. In the years leading up to World War II, she became a heroic though Machiavellian figure, leading the resistance against the Japanese invasion of China.

According to Milton Caniff: Conversations, she "was modeled from a real person, as are all Caniff's characters", in this case a succession of them, starting with professional model Phyllis Johnson, though Joan Crawford was the initial inspiration.

== In other media ==
Various actresses played the Dragon Lady in the radio series of Terry and the Pirates (1937–48), including Agnes Moorehead, Adelaide Klein and Marion Sweet. In the 1940 film serial, the part was played by Sheila Darcy. Gloria Saunders was cast as the Dragon Lady in the brief 1953 television series.

Radio actress Marion Sweet as the Dragon Lady

Agnes Moorehead's portrayal of the Dragon Lady is mentioned in Harlan Ellison's "Jeffty is Five" as a comment marking the passage of time and things past.

== See also ==
- Dragon Lady – the stereotype derived from the character
