= Terry and the Pirates (radio serial) =

1937–1948 American radio serial

Terry and the Pirates is a radio serial adapted from the comic strip of the same name created in 1934 by Milton Caniff. With storylines of action, high adventure and foreign intrigue, the popular radio series enthralled listeners from 1937 through 1948. With scripts by Albert Barker, George Lowther and others, the program's directors included Cyril Armbrister, Wylie Adams, and Marty Andrews.

The central character, Terry Lee, was portrayed at various times by Jackie Kelk, Cliff Carpenter, Owen Jordan, and Bill Fein. Some newspapers say that Jackie Kelk was the first actor to play Terry, when the series debuted on NBC in late October 1937. Terry's buddy Pat Ryan was played by Bud Collyer, Warner Anderson, Bob Griffin, and Larry Alexander. Others in Terry's Far East entourage were Flip Corkin (Ted de Corsia), Elita (Gerta Rozan), Burma (Frances Chaney), Hotshot Charlie (Cameron Andrews) and Connie the coolie (Cliff Norton, John Gibson, Peter Donald). Throughout the Orient, they encountered plenty of evildoers, including the Dragon Lady (Agnes Moorehead, Adelaide Klein, Marion Sweet, Mina Reaume), in such adventurous episodes as "Pirate Gold Detector Ring," "Deadly Current," "The Mechanical Eye" and "The Dragon Lady Strikes Back."

== History ==
When the late afternoon series began, it was heard at 5:15pm, three times a week, sponsored by Dari-Rich, airing on NBC Red Network from November 1, 1937 to June 1, 1938. It switched to NBC Blue Network on September 26, 1938, continuing until March 22, 1939. Absent from the airwaves for over two years, it returned shortly before the Attack on Pearl Harbor, heard in the Midwestern United States on the Chicago Tribune's WGN. That series, sponsored by Libby's, aired five days a week from October 16, 1941 to May 29, 1942.

With increasing popularity during the World War II years, the show next took off at a fast pace on Blue Network, airing daily for 15 minutes on weekday afternoons beginning February 1, 1943. The Quaker Puffed Wheat and Puffed Rice "shot from guns" commercials often had a patriotic pitch. Douglas Browning was the announcer during the mid-1940s. After 1945, with no wartime villains for Terry and his pals to fight, ratings began to drop in the post-World War II period until the final episode on June 30, 1948.

== See also ==
- Terry and the Pirates (comic strip)
- Terry and the Pirates (TV series)
- Terry and the Pirates (serial)
