= Terry and the Pirates =

Comic strip

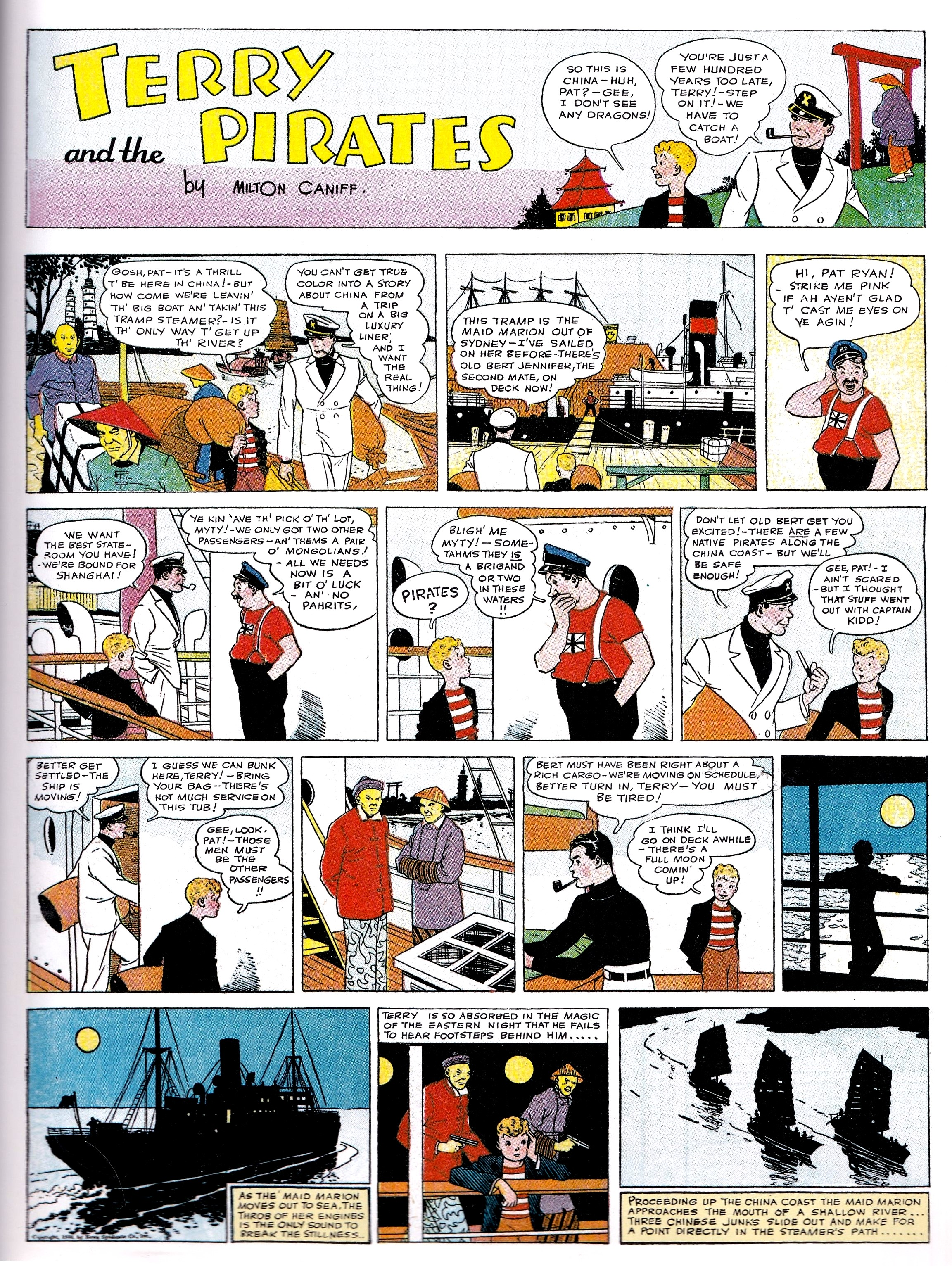
- The first Terry and the Pirates Sunday page was launched on December 9, 1934.
- Author: Milton Caniff (1934–1946); George Wunder (1946–1973)
- Current status/schedule: Concluded daily and Sunday strip
- Launch date: October 22, 1934
- End date: February 25, 1973
- Syndicate: Chicago Tribune New York News Syndicate
- Genre: Adventure

Terry and the Pirates is an action-adventure comic strip created by cartoonist Milton Caniff, which originally ran from October 22, 1934, to February 25, 1973. Captain Joseph Patterson, editor for the Chicago Tribune New York News Syndicate, had admired Caniff's work on the children's adventure strip Dickie Dare and hired him to create the new adventure strip, providing Caniff with the title and locale. The Dragon Lady leads the evil pirates; conflict with the pirates was diminished in priority when World War II started.

The strip was read by 31 million newspaper subscribers between 1934 and 1946. In 1946, Caniff won the first Cartoonist of the Year Award from the National Cartoonists Society for his work on Terry and the Pirates.

Writer Tom De Haven described Terry and the Pirates as "the great strip of World War II" and "The Casablanca of comics".

== Publication history ==
The daily strip began October 22, 1934, and the Sunday color pages began December 9, 1934. Initially, the storylines of the daily strips and Sunday pages were different, but on August 26, 1936, they merged into a single storyline.

Although Terry and the Pirates had made Caniff famous, the strip was owned by the syndicate, which was not uncommon at the time. Seeking creative control of his own work, Caniff left the strip in 1946, his last Terry strip being published on December 29. The following year, with the Field Syndicate, he launched Steve Canyon, an action-adventure strip of which Caniff retained ownership, which ran until shortly after his death in 1988.

After Caniff's departure, Terry and the Pirates was assigned to Associated Press artist George Wunder. Wunder drew highly detailed panels, but some critics, notably Maurice Horn, claimed that it was sometimes difficult to tell one character from another and that his work lacked Caniff's essential humor. Nevertheless, Wunder kept the strip going for another 27 years until its discontinuation on February 25, 1973, by which time Terry had reached the rank of colonel.

=== Reboot ===
On March 26, 1995, Michael Uslan and the Brothers Hildebrandt produced an updated version of the strip which carried over no continuity with the original. The Dragon Lady is portrayed as a Vietnam War orphan. The Hildebrandt/Uslan team left the strip and was replaced on April 1, 1996, with the team of Dan Spiegle (art) and Jim Clark (writing). The strip ended on July 27, 1997.

== Characters and story ==
The adventure begins with young Terry Lee, "a wide-awake American boy," arriving in then-contemporary China with his friend, two-fisted journalist Pat Ryan. Seeking a lost gold mine, they meet George Webster "Connie" Confucius, interpreter and local guide. Initially, crudely drawn backgrounds and stereotypical characters surrounded Terry as he matched wits with pirates and various other villains. He developed an ever-larger circle of friends and enemies, including Big Stoop, Captain Judas, Cheery Blaze, Chopstick Joe, Cue Ball, and Dude Hennick.

Milton Caniff's Terry and the Pirates (February 29, 1936). Terry, Pat Ryan, and Connie find themselves marooned on an island with mysterious Burma. Note Terry's boyish appearance in this early strip and backgrounds alternating from dark and detailed to blank.

Most notable of all was the famed femme fatale, the Dragon Lady, who started as an enemy and later, during World War II, became an ally. Caniff included a number of non-American female antagonists, all of whom referred to themselves in the third person. These included the Dragon Lady and crooks and spies like Sanjak and Rouge. In a rather bold move for a 1940s comic strip, Sanjak was hinted at being a lesbian cross-dresser with designs on Terry's girlfriend April Kane. Caniff purportedly named the character after an island next to the isle of Lesbos.

Over time, owing to a successful collaboration with cartoonist Noel Sickles, Caniff dramatically improved to produce some of the most memorable strips in the history of the medium. Ray Bailey, Caniff's assistant on Terry and the Pirates, went on to create his own adventure strip, Bruce Gentry.

=== Main ===
- Terry Lee: A teenager when the series begins, he is excitable and loves adventure. As the series goes on, he matures and joins the U.S. Army, becoming a pilot. After World War II, he works for the government in the post-war territories. In his last comic strip Feb 25, 1973, Colonel Lee is a USAF officer who helps break up a heroin smuggling ring which results in the arrest of its head, the President of a foreign country.
- Pat Ryan: Terry's friend and mentor, a writer and man of action who helps his young protégé out of scrapes. When World War II begins, he joins the U.S. Navy and sees action in the Pacific.
- Connie: George Webster Confucius, a Chinese man Terry and Pat hire as a guide. He speaks in Pidgin English and refers to himself in the third person. He is fiercely loyal to the duo. He eventually works with Pat as part of the Chinese resistance against the Japanese in the war.
- Big Stoop: A 9-foot-tall (2.7 m) Mongol whom Connie helped when he was being picked on by bullies. He remains with the trio out of gratitude. Immensely strong and mute, he earns his nickname from the phrase "he stoops to conquer". He was once a servant of the Dragon Lady; she cut out his tongue when he was young, earning his hatred. He works with Connie in the Chinese resistance during the war.
- The Dragon Lady: A beautiful but cold pirate queen who clashes with Terry and Pat continuously. As the Japanese invade China, she becomes a resistance leader, attacking Japanese forces, making it clear it is not out of patriotism but wanting to keep her riches intact. It is hinted she is in love with Pat, but she is unwilling to give up her empire for him. After the war ends, she returns to criminal activities.
- Burma: Real name unknown, a con artist, former pirate confederate and sultry singer with a good heart. She encounters Terry and Pat several times. She and Terry share a casual romantic connection, but Burma is afraid of letting it become serious. She has a habit of singing "St. Louis Blues".
- Normandie Drake: An heiress and Pat's true love, they grew close when he worked for her father. Her high society aunt refused to see her marry a "commoner" and forced her into an arranged marriage to the weak-willed Tony Sandhurst. When She and Pat meet again, she is pregnant with Tony's child and is committed to the marriage. When they meet again during the War, Normandie's child Merilly is four years old. When she discovers that Tony is working with the Axis powers, Normandie still refuses to divorce him.
- Raven Sherman: An heiress who used her fortune to support missionary work in China. She and Pat seem romantic, but she falls for pilot Dude Hennick. She dies in Hennick's arms after being attacked by Captain Judas and is buried in the China desert. Following her death in October 1941, Milton Caniff received annual reminders of her death.
- April Kane: A Southern belle who wins Terry's heart. She works as Pat's secretary when he is an agent of the Dragon Lady, but she leaves when she becomes the target of a blackmailer. She returns in 1944, having spent the last few years in a Japanese prison camp. The experience has hardened her, and she tries to make Terry jealous by cavorting with Flip Corkin. She tries to set up an airfield near an island army base but she learns too late that the Army is abandoning the island, and she is stranded there alone.
- Flip Corkin: Terry's flight instructor in the Air Force, who delivers the Sunday page lecture on military duty. Based on Phil Cochran.
- Taffy Tucker: Flip's girlfriend, an Army nurse. She briefly develops amnesia and is rescued by Pat, and they connect romantically. She returns to Flip after regaining her memory.
- Hotshot Charlie: Charles C. Charles, a comically flippant Boston pilot who becomes Terry's best friend in the Air Force. After the war ends, he is stifled by civilian life and jumps at the chance to help Terry out in post-war Asia doing government work.

=== Recurring ===
- Captain Blaze: A boisterous English pirate who helps Terry and Pat out against the Dragon Lady, later returning to help Pat out in China.
- Captain Judas: A debonair criminal who clashes with the heroes several times. A former partner of Burma's, he sustains severe facial burns when she throws a lamp in his face. He shoved Raven out of a truck, leading to her fatal injuries before being shot by Dude Hennick and presumably killed.
- Papa Pyzon: A corpulent criminal Terry and Pat meet in China who later returns as an Axis agent during the war.
- Nasty: Nastalathia Smythe-Heatherstone, a young heiress Terry and Burma rescue from a crashed plane. Her bratty and selfish attitude drives them crazy and nearly gets them killed. Years later, the now-grown Nasty returns to involve Terry and Charlie in her efforts to ship food to Chinese refugees, which is really an attempt to win Terry. She tries to woo Charlie to get at Terry.
- Tony Sandhurst: Normandie's rich but immoral husband, who puts himself above everyone. He tries to have Pat put in jail for ruining his business and is later revealed to be working for the Axis during the war and becomes a criminal kingpin in the post-war period.
- Hu Shee: The Dragon Lady's aide and confidante who sometimes impersonates her for some missions. She seems interested in a romance with Terry. She is apparently drowned under a sinking ship with new love, pirate Johnny Jingo.
- Cheery Blaze: Captain Blaze's hefty daughter who hates her father with a passion. She returns during the war working with the Axis but is arrested for her crimes.
- Singh-Singh: A dim-witted would-be warlord who clashes with Pat and the Dragon Lady. He later marries Cheery Blaze but is arrested with her.
- Chopstick Joe: An underworld figure who is a friendly rival of the Dragon Lady.
- Dude Hennick: An old friend of Pat's, an ace pilot who helps the heroes out. He goes to work for Raven Sherman, the two falling in love but she ends up dying in his arms. He vanishes from the strip and a Christmas, 1945 strip has Caniff saying he based the character on a pilot friend, Frank Cliff, who was killed in Shanghai and "Dude died with him."
- Sanjak: A Frenchwoman who dresses like a man, using a monocle to hypnotize people. She works for the Axis, impersonating a pilot to infiltrate Terry's Air Force base and is apparently killed in a crashing plane.
- Jos Goode: A Southern soldier who serves with Pat, Connie, and Big Stoop in the Pacific.
- Snake Tumblin: A fellow pilot of Terry's, he is apparently killed in a crashing plane. However, Caniff's final strips show him seemingly alive but blinded.
- Jane Allen: An Army nurse who falls in love with Snake. She and Terry seem to be getting closer but when she sees a picture of Snake alive, she leaves Terry on the tarmac in Caniff's final strip.

== During World War II ==
Caniff became increasingly concerned by the contemporary Second Sino-Japanese War, but he was prevented by his syndicate from identifying the Japanese directly. Caniff referred to them as "the invaders", and they soon became an integral part of the storyline.

After America's entry into World War II, Terry joined the United States Army Air Forces. The series then became almost exclusively about World War II with much action centering on a U.S. Army base in China. This change of tone is considered the end of the strip's prime, although it remained highly acclaimed. Terry gained a new mentor in flying instructor Colonel "Flip" Corkin, a character based on the real-life Colonel Philip "Flip" Cochran of the 1st Air Commando Group. Comic relief was provided by fellow flyer Hotshot Charlie. Pat, Connie and Big Stoop still made occasional guest appearances as marine commandos, while the Dragon Lady and her pirates became Chinese guerrillas fighting the Japanese.

One of the highlights of this period was the October 17, 1943, Sunday page, "The Pilot's Creed": Corkin gives the recently commissioned Terry a speech on his responsibilities as a fighter pilot, including the need to consider all who have contributed to the development of his plane, respect his support crew, spare a thought for ones killed in the fighting, and respect military bureaucracy which, for better or worse, has kept the American army going for over 150 years. In an unusual honor, the episode was read aloud in the U.S. Congress and added to the Congressional Record by Congressman Carl Hinshaw.

The intensely patriotic Caniff, who donated design and illustration work to the military, created a free variant of Terry and the Pirates for the military newspaper Stars and Stripes. Originally starring the beautiful adventuress Burma, it was racier than the regular strip, and complaints caused Caniff to rename it Male Call to avoid confusion. Male Call was discontinued in 1946.

== Awards ==
In 1946, Caniff won the first Cartoonist of the Year Award from the National Cartoonists Society for his work on Terry and the Pirates.

== Reprints ==
NBM, under its Flying Buttress Comics Library line, reprinted all of the Caniff Terry strips (10/22/34 to 12/29/46) in two hardcover series as well as in a series of trade paperbacks. The first 12-volume series contained all of the dailies and the Sundays in black and white. The second 12-volume series contained all of the Sundays in color with each page split between two pages. The daily strips were also printed by NBM in a 25-volume softcover edition (reprinting all of the dailies and the Sundays that ran concurrent storylines) with the strips in a smaller size and a lower quality than the hardcover volumes.

Kitchen Sink Press began a new hardcover reprint series with dailies and Sundays (in color and presented complete on one page, including title bars in the strips from the first year that were omitted from the NBM series), but discontinued it after only two volumes. These out-of-print series can be hard to find.

In March 2007, IDW Publishing announced a new imprint, The Library of American Comics. It published The Complete Terry and the Pirates a collection of six hardcover editions reprinting the Sunday strips with their original color alongside the daily strips.

As of 2015 Hermes Press has reprinted two volumes of the George Wunder comic strip (1946–1949) as 12" x 9" hardcovers with supplementary material and historic essays.

== In popular culture ==
In 1953, Canada Dry offered a "premium giveaway" with a case of its ginger ale — one mini-book in a trilogy series of Terry and the Pirates strips by Wunder printed by Harvey Comics.

Other incarnations of Caniff's work included a 1940 movie adventure-serial by Columbia, a television series, and radio show. The August–September 1953 issue (#6) of Mad featured a satire by Wally Wood titled "Teddy and the Pirates" where Teddy and Half-Shot Charlie encounter the Dragging Lady, resulting in Half-Shot being thrown to the sharks while Teddy reveals the reason for the strip's name — the pirates work for Teddy.

In the Warner Bros. cartoon China Jones, Daffy Duck plays a private detective, and goes to a Chinese bakery to receive a "hot tip". The informant sends him to visit the "Dragon Lady", who, upon meeting Daffy, breathes fire on him. Later, the informant asks him, "How was that tip?", and Daffy answers, "A little too hot for my taste."

Terry and the Pirates has been cited by fellow comic illustrator Doug Wildey as one of his main inspirations for the 1964 Hanna Barbera television cartoon Jonny Quest. Joseph Barbera directly credited Terry and the Pirates during Barbera's Oral History of Television interview as his inspiration for Jonny Quest.

Robert Culp said that the comic strip Terry and the Pirates was his inspiration for the "tone" and "spirit" and "noir heightened realism" of the 1965 NBC television series I Spy when he was writing the pilot. It had been Culp's ambition to write, produce, and direct a screenplay based on the comic strip, but Culp died in 2010, before he could finish it.

Enter the Dragon producer Paul Heller used the strip as a guide to production design and the look of the film. "It was high chroma reds, blues, golds, and it just lent itself to this project so closely," said Heller.

Artist John Romita Sr. got the idea to kill Peter Parker (Spider-Man)'s girlfriend, Gwen Stacy, after Terry and the Pirates' killing of Raven Sherman.

Umberto Eco's novel The Mysterious Flame of Queen Loana references Terry and the Pirates.

In 1995, the strip was one of 20 included in the "Comic Strip Classics" series of commemorative postage stamps.

In the 1983 movie, 'A Christmas Story', a Terry and the Pirates comic strip appears on back of the newspaper Ralphie's father (Darren McGavin) is reading when Ralphie's mom takes him upstairs after the BB gun incident.

The Dragon Lady and Hotshot Charlie have made cameo appearances in the Dick Tracy daily cartoon strip. Dick Tracy and Hotshot Charlie are acquainted with each other.

== See also ==
- List of Terry and the Pirates comic strips
- Terry and the Pirates (radio serial)
- Terry and the Pirates (serial)
- Terry and the Pirates (TV series)
