= Ska Daddyz =

American ska band

Ska Daddyz is an American ska band from Silver Strand Beach in Oxnard, California. They were founded in 1993. They are known for their cover version of Eagles', "Hotel California".

Ska Daddyz have played alongside bands such as Big Bad Voodoo Daddy, The Specials, No Doubt and Save Ferris across the west-coast. At the Ska-Summit 2003 in Las Vegas, the band joined acts with The Mighty Mighty Bosstones and Madness. The SkaDaddyZ describe their music as a blend of ska, funk, rasta, and punk - all this presented with extreme energy. The band has a self-produced album Rude Boyz with Übersee Records. Darren "Zorba" Cruz and Blake Cruz are both brothers of Brandon Cruz, the child actor of The Courtship of Eddie's Father fame, also lead singer of Nardcore original punks Dr. Know and Dead Kennedys.
