= Bill Bixby =

American actor and director (1934–1993)

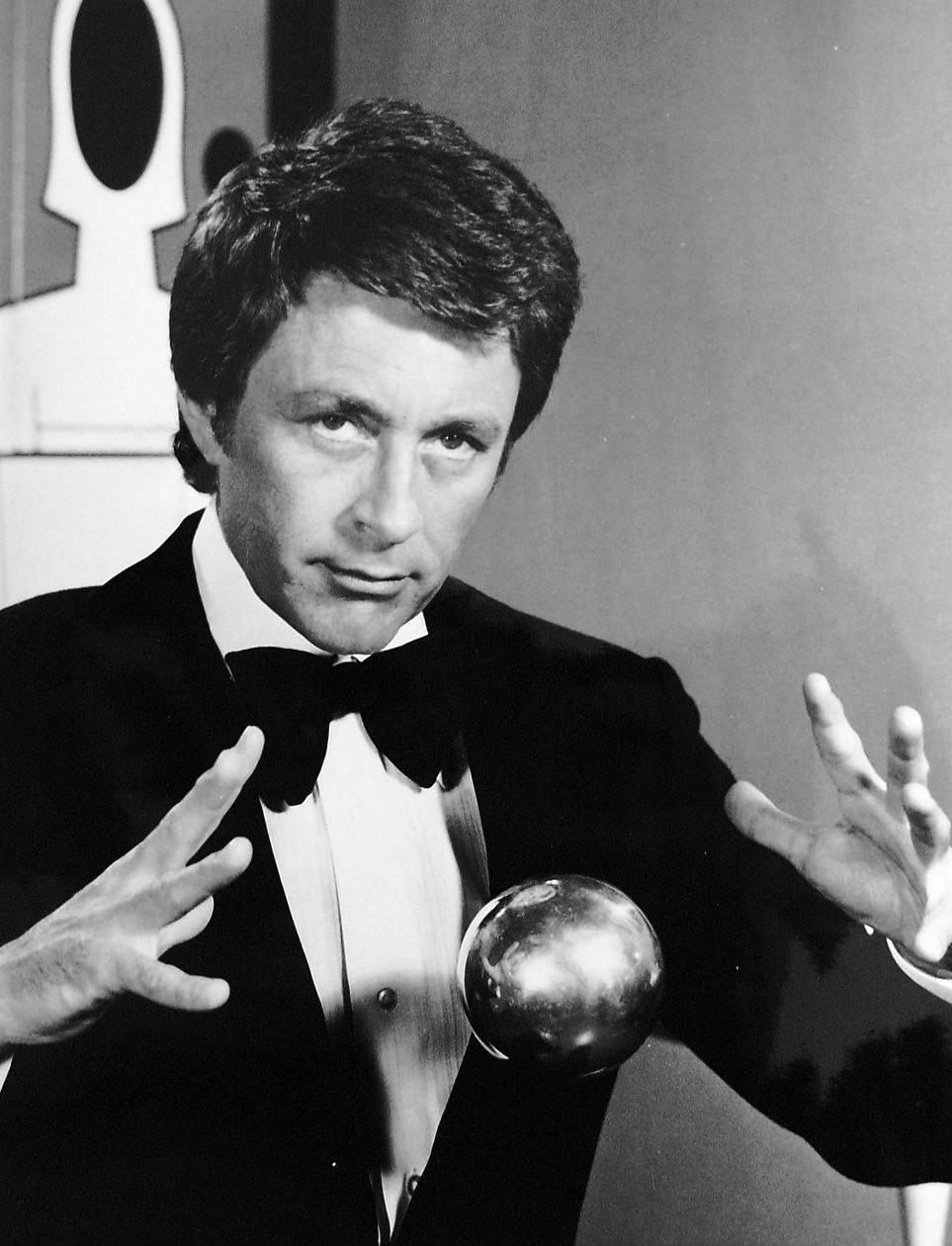
- Bixby as The Magician, 1973
- Born: Wilfred Bailey Everett Bixby III; January 22, 1934; San Francisco, California, U.S.
- Died: November 21, 1993 (aged 59); Los Angeles, California, U.S.
- Education: University of California, Berkeley
- Occupations: Actor; director; producer; game-show panellist
- Years active: 1959–1993
- Television: My Favorite Martian, The Courtship of Eddie's Father, The Magician, The Incredible Hulk
- Spouses: Brenda Benet (m. 1971; div. 1980); Laura Michaels (m. 1990; div. 1991); Judith Kliban (m. 1993)
- Children: 1

Signature
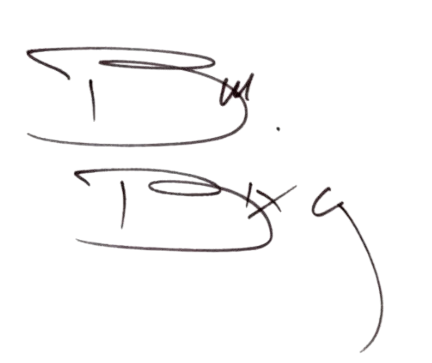

Wilfred Bailey Everett Bixby III (January 22, 1934 – November 21, 1993) was an American actor and television director. His career spanned more than three decades, including appearances on stage, in films, and on television series. He is known for his roles in the CBS sitcom My Favorite Martian as Tim O'Hara, in the ABC sitcom The Courtship of Eddie's Father as Tom Corbett, in the NBC crime drama series The Magician as stage illusionist Anthony Blake, in the ABC miniseries Rich Man, Poor Man as Willie Abbott, and the CBS science-fiction drama series The Incredible Hulk as Dr. David Bruce Banner.

== Early life ==
A fifth-generation Californian of English-Scottish descent and an only child, Wilfred Bailey Everett Bixby III was born on January 22, 1934, in San Francisco, California. His father, Wilfred Bailey Everett Bixby II, was a store clerk. His mother, Jane (née McFarland) Bixby, was a senior manager at I. Magnin & Co. In 1942, when Bixby was eight years old, his father enlisted in the Navy during World War II and traveled to the South Pacific. While in the seventh grade, Bixby attended Grace Cathedral and sang in the church's choir. In 1946 his mother encouraged him to take ballroom dance lessons, and from there he began dancing at various city events. He attended Lowell High School, where he perfected his oratory and dramatic skills as a member of the Lowell Forensic Society. Though he received average grades, he also competed in high-school speech tournaments regionally.

After graduating from high school in 1952, he majored in drama at City College of San Francisco, against his parents' wishes.

During the Korean War, Bixby was drafted shortly after his 18th birthday. Rather than report to the United States Army, Bixby joined the United States Marine Corps Reserve. He served primarily in personnel management with Marine Attack Squadron 141 (VMA-141) at Naval Air Station Oakland, and attained the rank of private first class before his 1956 discharge.

Later he attended the University of California, Berkeley, his parents' alma mater, and left just a few credits short of earning a degree. He explained that he had been majoring in pre-law only because it was what his parents expected of him, and he finally asked his parents to instead give him five years to find out if he could succeed as an actor. He then moved to Hollywood, California, where he had a string of odd jobs that included bellhop and lifeguard. He organized shows at a resort in Jackson Hole, Wyoming.

== Career ==
=== Beginning acting ===
In 1959 Bill Bixby made a shrewd business decision. Rather than competing with hundreds of hopefuls trying to gain a foothold in Hollywood movies, he broke into motion pictures by working in industrial films. The films were produced in Chicago by Jam Handy and by Norman Wilding. Bixby knew that these special-interest films would never be seen by the general public, but he saw them as a great opportunity to learn how to work before a camera and understand the functions of a film crew. He hoped to work in musical comedy, and in 1961 he joined the cast of the musical The Boy Friend at the Detroit Civic Theater.

He returned to Hollywood to make his television debut on an episode of The Many Loves of Dobie Gillis. He became a highly regarded character actor and guest-starred in many television series, including Ben Casey, The Twilight Zone, The Andy Griffith Show, Dr. Kildare, Straightaway, and Hennesey. He joined the cast of The Joey Bishop Show in 1962, which he later described as his "first big break." In 1963 he played a sailor with a Napoleon tattoo in the movie Irma La Douce, a romantic comedy starring Jack Lemmon and Shirley MacLaine, directed by Billy Wilder and based on the 1956 French musical. During the 1970s he made guest appearances on television series such as Ironside, Insight, Barbary Coast, The Love Boat, Medical Center, four episodes of Love, American Style, Fantasy Island, and two episodes each of The Streets of San Francisco and Rod Serling's Night Gallery.

While working on other Danny Thomas productions, Bixby would watch rehearsals for The Dick Van Dyke Show, which inspired him to want to be a director as well.

=== My Favorite Martian ===
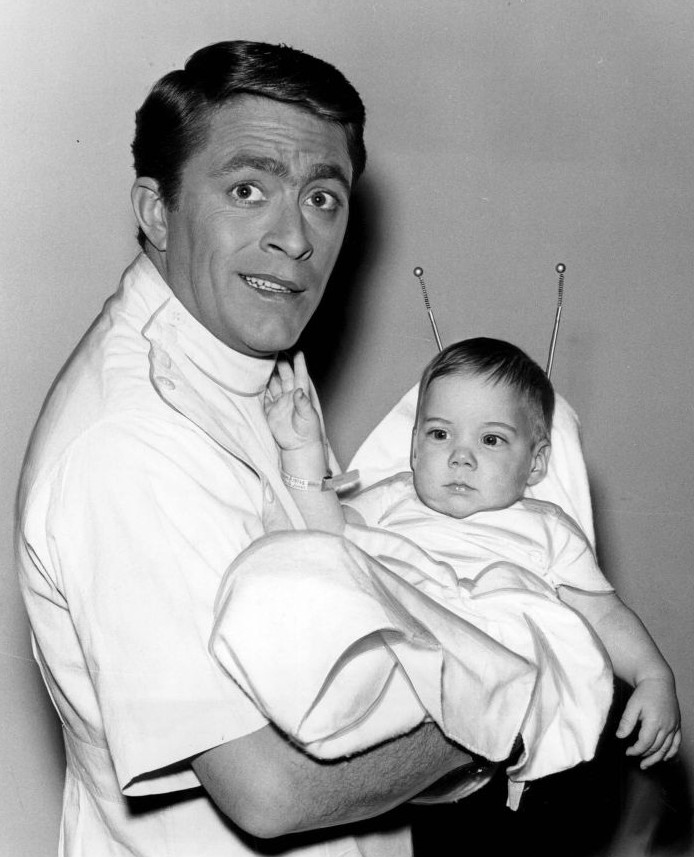
Bixby as Tim O'Hara in My Favorite Martian, when an accident turns Uncle Martin back into a baby (season 2, episode 28)

Bixby took the role of young reporter Tim O'Hara in the 1963 CBS sitcom My Favorite Martian, in which he co-starred with Ray Walston. This was Bixby's first starring vehicle, and he became a popular personality. The series, filmed in black-and-white at Desilu, was hugely successful, rating in the top 10 network programs during its first season. The second season saw the ratings slip slightly to the top 30, but they were respectable enough for CBS to renew the series for a third season, to be filmed in color at MGM. By 1966, however, higher production costs and lower ratings (now top 50) forced the series to be canceled after 107 episodes.

=== Other early roles ===
After its cancellation, Bixby starred in four movies: Ride Beyond Vengeance, Doctor, You've Got to Be Kidding!, and two of Elvis Presley's movies, Clambake and Speedway. He turned down the role as Marlo Thomas's boyfriend in the successful That Girl, though he later guest-starred in the show, and starred in two failed pilots.

=== The Courtship of Eddie's Father ===
In 1969, Bixby starred in his second high-profile television role, as Tom Corbett in The Courtship of Eddie's Father, a comedy drama on ABC. The series concerned a widowed father raising a young son, managing a major syndicated magazine, and at the same time trying to re-enter the dating scene. This series was in the vein of other 1960s and 1970s sitcoms that dealt with widowerhood, such as The Andy Griffith Show and My Three Sons. Eddie was played by novice actor Brandon Cruz. Cruz and Bixby developed a close rapport that translated to an off-camera friendship as well. According to Bixby, "The amazing thing is that when we're working in a scene together, there's never a thought of conscious acting. Our natural affection for one another is what appeals to the audience." The core cast was rounded out by Academy Award-winning actress Miyoshi Umeki, who played the role of Tom's housekeeper, Mrs. Livingston; James Komack (one of the series' producers) as Norman Tinker, Tom's pseudo-hippie, quirky photographer; and actress Kristina Holland as Tom's secretary, Tina. One episode of the series co-starred Bixby's future wife, Brenda Benet, as one of Tom's girlfriends.

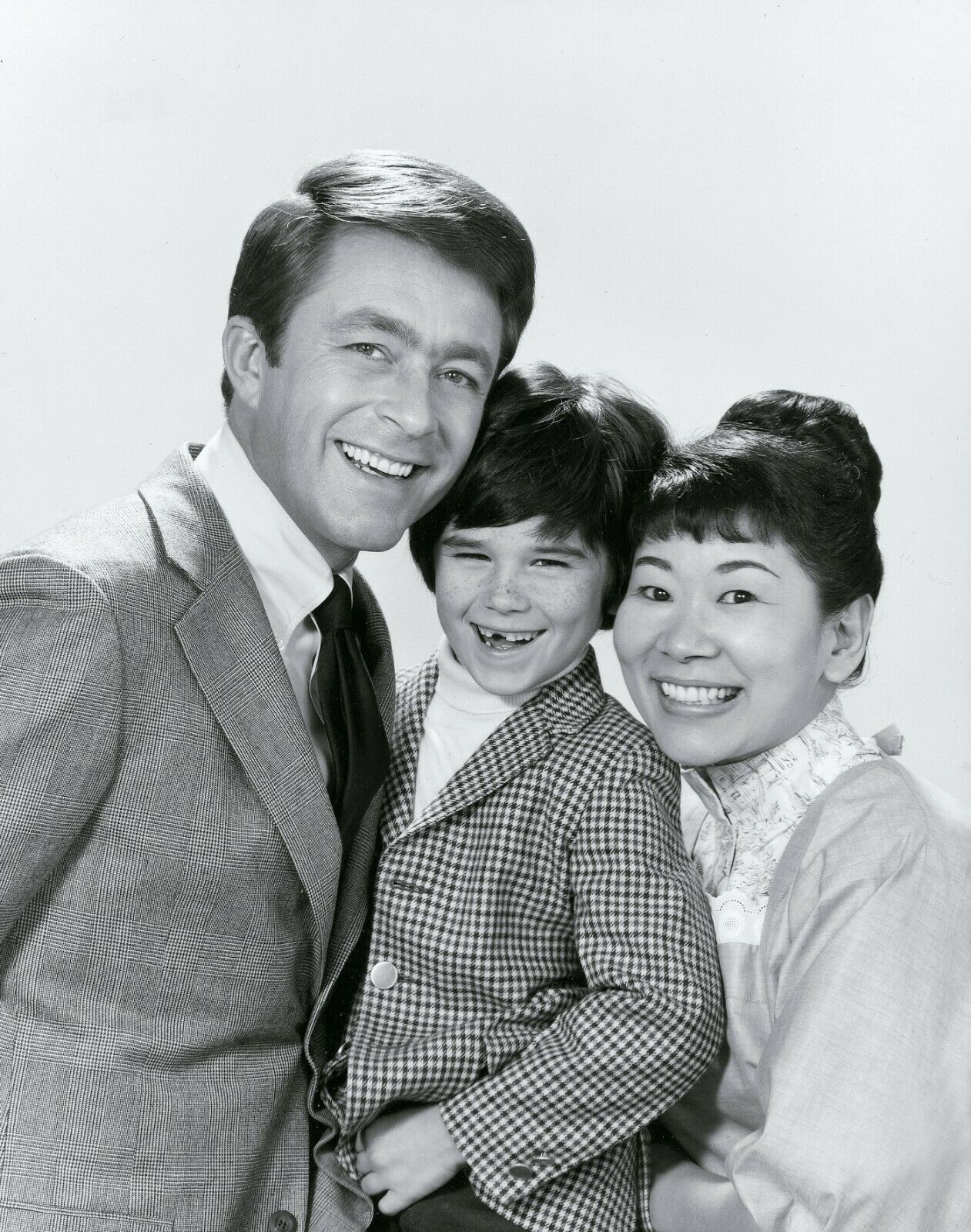
With The Courtship of Eddie's Father co-stars, Brandon Cruz and Miyoshi Umeki

Bixby was nominated for the Emmy Award for Lead Actor in a Comedy Series in 1971. The following year, he won the Parents Without Partners Exemplary Service Award for 1972.

Bixby made his directorial debut on the sitcom in 1970, directing eight episodes. ABC cancelled the sitcom in 1972 at the end of season three.

According to Bixby, his experiences on The Courtship of Eddie's Father helped make him ready for marriage and fatherhood.

After the show was cancelled, Bixby and Cruz remained in contact, with Cruz making a guest appearance on Bixby's later series, The Incredible Hulk. The death of Bixby's only child, in 1981, drew Bixby and Cruz closer still. The two remained in contact until Bixby's death in 1993. In 1995, Cruz named his own son Lincoln Bixby Cruz.

Brandon Cruz said of the show that developed a professional father–son relationship, compared to that of The Andy Griffith Show, "We dealt with issues that were talked about, but were never brought up on television. Bill wasn't the first actor to portray a single widowed father, but he became one of the popular ones, because of his easy-going way of this crazy little kid." Prior to Bixby's promotion to director, Cruz said, "He was looking for the best dolly grip, along with the boom operator that if something was called specifically and failed, Bill could be easily angry." On the kind of relationship Bixby had wanted with his co-star, Cruz also said, "Bill would never speak down to me. Bill treated me as an equal. He made sure that we had a lot of time together, just so he could kinda crawl inside my head and see what actually made a kid tick." Upon the death of Bixby's real-life father in 1971, Cruz stated, "He had that type of mentality that the show must go on, thinking it was just a great TV show, after he broke down weeping."

In a 2011 interview with Marilyn Beck and Stacy Jenel Smith about how Bill Bixby's fame was supposed to posthumously honor him for a star on the Hollywood Walk of Fame, Cruz said, "When I found out they were putting this out, I thought, 'It's about time.' Bill Bixby had an amazing body of work, not only Courtship of Eddie's Father, but My Favorite Martian, The Magician, The Incredible Hulk, and so many other things, as an actor, as a director — and he never got an Emmy. He's never been recognized posthumously by the Academy. And he doesn't have a star on the Hollywood Walk of Fame. That is criminal.... There are people who have stars that, not to be blunt, but I wouldn't bother spitting on their stars. Bill's talent would take a couple of blocks of stars compared to them. It really demeans the whole thing that Bill is not included."

=== 1973 to 1977 ===
In 1973, Bixby starred in The Magician. The series was well liked, but lasted for only one season. An accomplished amateur magician himself, he hosted several TV specials in the mid-1970s which featured other amateur magicians, and was a respected member of the Hollywood magic community, belonging to The Magic Castle, an exclusive club for magicians. During the show's popular, although short-lived, production, Bixby invited a few old friends along to co-star such as Pamela Britton (in her final role), Kristina Holland, and Ralph O'Hara.

Also in 1973, he starred in Steambath, a play by author Bruce Jay Friedman, on PBS with Valerie Perrine and Jose Perez.

Bixby became a popular game-show panelist, appearing mostly on Password and The Hollywood Squares. He was also a panelist on the 1974 revival of Masquerade Party, which was hosted by Richard Dawson. He had also appeared with Dawson on Cop-Out, an unsold 1972 pilot produced by Chuck Barris, and on the 1972 revival of I've Got a Secret. In 1974–1975, he directed four episodes of the eighth season of Mannix, guest-starring as Mannix's friend-turned-villain in one of the episodes.

In 1975, he co-starred with Tim Conway and Don Knotts in the Disney movie The Apple Dumpling Gang, which was well received by the public.

Returning to television, Bixby worked with Susan Blakely on Rich Man, Poor Man, a highly successful television miniseries in 1976. He played a daredevil stunt pilot in an episode of the short-lived 1976 CBS adventure series Spencer's Pilots, starring Gene Evans. In 1977, he co-starred in the pilot for the television series Fantasy Island; starred in "No Way Out", the final episode of the NBC anthology series Quinn Martin's Tales of the Unexpected (known in the United Kingdom as Twist in the Tale); and appeared with Donna Mills, Richard Jaeckel, and William Shatner in the last episode, "The Scarlet Ribbon", of NBC's Western series The Oregon Trail, starring Rod Taylor and Andrew Stevens. Bixby directed two episodes of The Oregon Trail.

In 1976, he was honored with two Emmy Award nominations, one for Outstanding Lead Actor for a Single Appearance in Drama or Comedy for The Streets of San Francisco and the other for Outstanding Single Performance by a Supporting Actor in Comedy or Drama Series for Rich Man, Poor Man.

Bixby hosted Once Upon a Classic on PBS from 1976 to 1980.

=== The Incredible Hulk ===
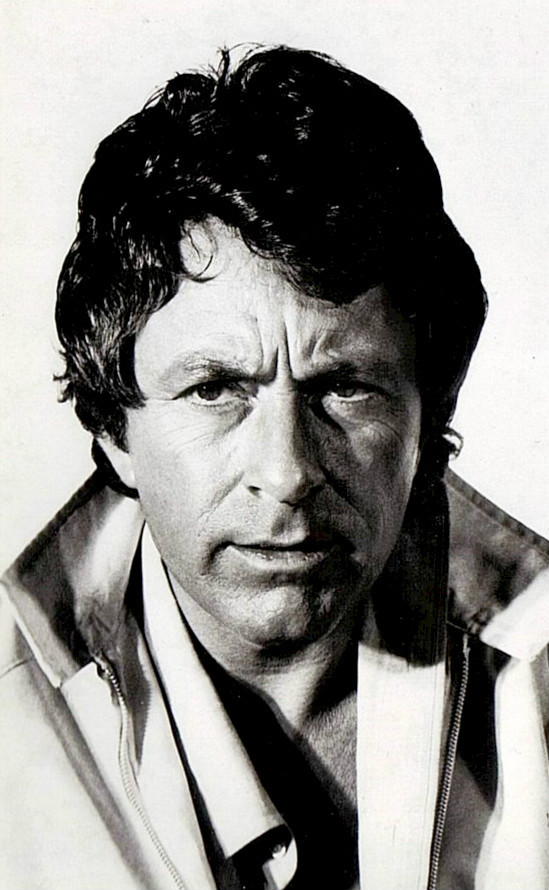
Bixby as Dr. David Bruce Banner in the 1977 pilot for the Incredible Hulk television series.

Bixby starred in the role of Dr. David Bruce Banner in the pilot movie The Incredible Hulk, based on the Stan Lee and Jack Kirby Marvel characters. Kenneth Johnson, the creator, director, and writer, said that Bixby was his only choice to play the part. When Bixby was offered the role, he declined it – until he read the script and discussed it with Johnson. The success of the pilot (coupled with some theatrical releases of the film in Europe) convinced CBS to turn it into a weekly series, which began airing in the spring of 1978. The pilot also starred Susan Sullivan as Dr. Elaina Marks, who tries to help the conflicted and widowed Dr. Banner overcome his "problem" and falls in love with him in the process. In a retrospective on The Incredible Hulk, Glenn Greenberg declared Bixby's performance to be the series' "foremost" strength, elaborating that he "masterfully conveyed the profound loneliness and tragedy of Dr. Banner while also bringing to the role an abundance of warmth, intelligence, humor, nobility, likability, and above all else, humanity."

During the series' run, Bixby invited two of his longtime friends, Ray Walston and Brandon Cruz, to guest-star with him in different episodes of the series. He also worked on the series with his friend, movie actress Mariette Hartley, who later starred with Bixby in his final series, Goodnight, Beantown, in 1983. Hartley appears in the well-regarded double-length episode "Married", and subsequently won an Emmy Award for her guest appearance. Future star Loni Anderson also guest-starred with Bixby during the first season. Bixby directed one episode of the series, "Bring Me the Head of the Hulk", in 1980 (original airdate: January 9, 1981). He had been scheduled to direct three episodes, but because playing the lead role in the series took up so much of his time (since The Incredible Hulk involved much more location shooting than Bixby's previous shows), he was forced to cut it down to just the one.

The series was cancelled after the following season, but leftover episodes aired as late as the next June. Bixby later executive-produced and reprised the role in three television movies – The Incredible Hulk Returns, The Trial of the Incredible Hulk, and The Death of the Incredible Hulk – the last two of which he also directed, and the first of which he has been said to have unofficially co-directed. Bixby was proud of the series as one that parents and children could watch together, though he did not allow his own son to watch the show for fear that he would be frightened by the sight of his father transforming into a green monster.

=== Later work ===
Bixby was executive producer and co-star of the short-lived sitcom Goodnight, Beantown (1983–84). He also directed three episodes of the series. During the same time, Bixby directed several episodes of another short-lived television series, Wizards and Warriors, which aired in 1983. From 1982 to 1984, he hosted a documentary series for Nickelodeon entitled Against the Odds. The series, which was cancelled after only two seasons, consists of short biographies of famous people throughout history. From 1986 to 1987, he hosted the syndicated weekday anthology series True Confessions. In 1987, he directed eight episodes of the satirical police sitcom Sledge Hammer!, including the episode "Hammer Hits the Rock" in season two, where he made an uncredited appearance as Zeke.

Bixby hosted two specials regarding Elvis conspiracy theories and his alleged sightings: The Elvis Files (1991) and The Elvis Conspiracy (1992).

Bixby made his last acting appearance in 1992, guest-starring in the television movie Diagnosis Murder: Diagnosis of Murder.

He finished his career by directing 30 episodes (in seasons two and three) of the NBC sitcom Blossom.

== Personal life and death ==
Bixby's first marriage was to actress Brenda Benet. They were married in 1971, and she gave birth to their son, Christopher, in September 1974. They divorced in 1980. A few months later, in March 1981, six-year-old Christopher died while on a skiing vacation at Mammoth Lakes with Benet. He went into cardiac arrest after doctors inserted a breathing tube when he suffered acute epiglottitis. Benet committed suicide the following year. The two deaths profoundly impacted Bixby; years later his home was still filled with pictures of Christopher, and he confessed to reporters that he would often speak to Christopher when he was alone.

Bixby met Laura Michaels, who had worked on the set of one of his Hulk movies, in 1989. They married a year later in Hawaii. In early 1991, he was diagnosed with prostate cancer and underwent treatment. Though Bixby felt he had recovered following the treatment, a year later the symptoms returned, and Michaels divorced him shortly after.

In late 1992, friends introduced Bixby to the artist Judith Kliban, widow of the cartoonist B. Kliban. He married her in October 1993.

In early 1993, after rumors began circulating about his health, Bixby went public with his illness, making several appearances on shows such as Entertainment Tonight, Today, and Good Morning America, among others. He also counselled other cancer patients.

On November 21, 1993, six days after his final assignment on Blossom, Bixby died of complications from prostate cancer in Century City, Los Angeles, California. He was 59 years old.

== Filmography ==
=== Film ===
Year	Title	Role	Notes
1962	Lonely Are the Brave	Airman in Helicopter	Billy Mims
1963	Irma la Douce	Tattooed Sailor	
1963	Under the Yum Yum Tree	Track Team Coach	Uncredited
1966	Ride Beyond Vengeance	Johnsy Boy Hood	
1967	Doctor, You've Got to Be Kidding!	Dick Bender	
1967	Clambake	James J. Jamison III	
1968	Speedway	Kenny Donford	
1975	The Apple Dumpling Gang	Russell Donovan	
1977	The Kentucky Fried Movie	Himself	(segment "Headache Clinic")

=== Television ===
Year	Title	Role	Notes
1961	Hennesey	Intern	Episode: "Welcome Home, Dr. Blair"
1961	Straightaway	Actor	Episode: "The Tin Caesar"
1961	The Many Loves of Dobie Gillis	Roger	Episode: "The Gigolo"
1961	Ben Casey	Intern at Party	Episode: "A Few Brief Lines for Dave"
1961	Bachelor Father	Paul	Episode: "The Law and Kelly Gregg"
1961	Checkmate	Pete Canaday	Episode: "To the Best of My Recollection"
1961, 1963	Make Room for Daddy	Joey / Mack / Tom Bradley, the Rival	3 episodes
1962	The Andy Griffith Show	Ronald Bailey	Episode: "Bailey's Bad Boy"
1962	Death Valley Days	Kinney	Episode: "Justice at Jackson Creek"
1962	Follow the Sun	Jason Wylie	Episode: "Chalk One Up for Johnny"
1962	The Joey Bishop Show	Charles Raymond	Recurring role (season 1)
1962	Alcoa Premiere	Bruce	2 episodes
1962	Dr. Kildare	Dr. John Grant	Episode: "The Soul Killer"
1963	The Twilight Zone	OOD Smith	Episode: "The Thirty-Fathom Grave"
1963	The Eleventh Hour	Art	Episode: "Try to Keep Alive Until Next Tuesday"
1963	Dr. Kildare	Dr. Ben Mollenhour	Episode: "The Balance and the Crucible"
1963	The Lieutenant	Private Stu Sallaway	Episode: "A Million Miles from Clary"
1963–1966	My Favorite Martian	Tim O'Hara	Main cast
1964–1965	Valentine's Day	Carl Pierce	Recurring role (9 episodes)
1966	Combat!	Kline	Episode: "The Losers"
1966–1974	Hollywood Squares	Himself (Center Square/Panelist)	Game show, series regular (114 episodes)
1967	Iron Horse	Dan Gilmore	Episode: "Appointment with Epitaph"
1967	That Girl	Harry Banner	Episode: "The Apartment"
1967	Dream Girl of '67	Himself (Bachelor Judge)	Game show, 10 episodes
1968	The Danny Thomas Hour	David	Episode: "Two for Penny"
1968	It Takes a Thief	George Palmer	Episode: "To Steal a Battleship"
1968	The Ghost & Mrs. Muir	Paul Wilkie	Episode: "The Ghost Hunter"
1968	Ironside	Edward Neufane	Episode: "Sergeant Mike"
1968	Hollywood Squares (prime time)	Himself (Panelist)	Game show, 3 episodes
1969, 1971	Insight	Johnny	2 episodes
1969	Love, American Style	Darian Patrick	Episode: "Love and the Legal Agreement"
1969	Win with the Stars	Himself (Celebrity Contestant)	Game show, 1 episode
1969	Stump the Stars	Himself (Panelist)	Game show, 1 episode
1969–1972	The Courtship of Eddie's Father	Tom Corbett	Main cast Nominated—Primetime Emmy Award for Outstanding Lead Actor in a Comedy Series (1971)
1970	Love, American Style	Alan	Episode: "Love and the Eskimo"
1970	Ironside	Tom Dayton	Episode: "Tom Dayton Is Loose Among Us"
1970	It Takes Two	Himself	Game show, 1 episode
1970	The Dating Game	Himself (Panelist)	Game show, 1 episode
1971	Big Fish, Little Fish	Ronnie Johnson	TV movie
1971	Congratulations, It's a Boy!	Johnny Gaines	TV movie
1971–1972	Love, American Style	Kenny Frasier	2 episodes
1971–1974	Password All-Stars	Himself (Celebrity Contestant)	Game show, 7 episodes
1972	Night Gallery	Noel / Bruce Tarrady	2 episodes
1972	Search	Mark Elliott	Episode: "The Adonis File"
1972	The Couple Takes a Wife	Jeff Hamilton	TV movie
1972	Medical Center	Dr. Hurst	Episode: "Pressure Point"
1973	Barnaby Jones	Alex Chandler	Episode: "To Denise, with Love and Murder"
1973	Steambath	Tandy	TV movie
1973	Shirts/Skins	Teddy Bush	TV movie
1973–1974	The Magician	Anthony Blake / Anthony Dorian	Title role
1974	Rex Harrison Presents Stories of Love	William	TV movie
1974	Ironside	Dr. Gallin	Episode: "Raise the Devil"
1974	The Streets of San Francisco	Jerry Schilling	Episode: "Target: Red"; Nominated—Primetime Emmy Award for Outstanding Guest Actor in a Drama Series
1975	Mannix	Tony Elliott	Episode: "The Empty Tower"
1975	Barbary Coast	Philippe Despard	Episode: "The Barbary Coast"
1976	The Streets of San Francisco	Eric Doyle	Episode: "Police Buff"
1976	Rich Man, Poor Man	Willie Abbott	Miniseries, main cast Nominated—Primetime Emmy Award for Outstanding Supporting Actor in a Miniseries or Movie
1976	Spencer's Pilots	Philo McGraw	Episode: "Pilot"
1976	The Invasion of Johnson County	Sam Lowell	TV movie
1976	The Great Houdini	Reverend Ford	TV movie
1976–1980	Once Upon a Classic	Himself (Host)	Anthology series, main cast Nominated—Daytime Emmy Award for Outstanding Individual Achievement in a Children's Program (1981)
1977	Fantasy Island	Arnold Greenwood	Episode: "Pilot"
1977	Quinn Martin's Tales of the Unexpected	Lieutenant Commander John Kelty	Episode: "No Way Out"
1977	Black Market Baby	Herbert Freemont	TV movie
1977	The Love Boat	John Ballard	Episode: "Message for Maureen/Gotcha/Acapulco Connection"
1977	The Oregon Trail	Fred F. Mason	Episode: "The Scarlet Ribbon"
1977–1982	The Incredible Hulk	David Bruce Banner	Main cast TV Land Award for Character You REALLY Don't Want to Make Angry (2008)
1982	Murder Is Easy	Professor Luke Williams	TV movie
1982	The Book of Lists	Himself (Host)	Television special (based on book The Book of Lists)
1982	I've Had It Up to Here	unknown role	TV movie
1983–1984	Goodnight, Beantown	Matt Cassidy	Main cast
1985	International Airport	Harvey Johnson	TV movie
1985–1986	True Confessions	Himself (Host)	Anthology series, main cast (season 1) (based on True Confessions magazine)
1986	Sin of Innocence	David McGary	TV movie
1987	J.J. Starbuck	Donald Iskin	Episode: "Pilot"
1987	Sledge Hammer!	Zeke	Episode: "Hammer Hits the Rock"
1988	The Incredible Hulk Returns	David Bruce Banner	TV movie
1989	The Trial of the Incredible Hulk	David Bruce Banner	TV movie
1990	The Death of the Incredible Hulk	David Bruce Banner	TV movie
1991	An American Story	Himself	Television special
1992	Diagnosis Murder: Diagnosis of Murder	Nick Osborne	TV movie
1993	Blossom	Cop (voice)	Episode: "Blossom's Dilemma"

== Production credits ==
=== Television ===
Year	Title	Contribution	Notes
1970–1972	The Courtship of Eddie's Father	Director	Director (8 episodes) – "Gifts Are for Giving" (1970) – "Two's Company" (1971) – "Happy Birthday to You" (1971) – "A Brave at Natchanoomi" (1971) – "The Karate Story" (1972) – "The Investors" (1972) – "In the Eye of the Beholder" (1972) – "Time for a Change" (1972)
1972–1973	Room 222	Director	Director (2 episodes) – "Elizabeth Brown Is Failing" (1972) – "The Noon Goon" (1973)
1974	The Magician	Director	Episode: "The Illusion of the Evil Spikes"
1975	Mannix	Director	Director (4 episodes) – "A Word Called Courage" – "A Ransom for Yesterday" – "The Empty Tower" – "Hardball"
1975	Barbary Coast	Director	Director (2 episodes) – "The Barbary Coast" – "Jesse Who?"
1975	Kate McShane	Director	Episode: "God at $15,732 a Year"
1976	Ber D'Angelo/Superstar	Director	Episode: "A Noise in the Streets"
1976	Spencer's Pilots	Director	Director (2 episodes) – "The Drone" – "The Hunted"
1976–1977	Rich Man, Poor Man — Book II	Director	Director (2 episodes) – "Chapter III (1976) – "Chapter XVIII" (1977); Nominated—Directors Guild Award for Outstanding Directorial Achievement in Dramatic Series (1977)
1977	Charlie's Angels	Director	Episode: "Dirty Business"
1977	The Oregon Trail	Director	Episode: "The Scarlet Ribbon"
1978	Three on a Date	Director	Television film
1978	The Many Loves of Arthur	Director	Television film
1981	The Incredible Hulk	Director	Episode: "Bring Me the Head of the Hulk"
1981–1982	Mr. Merlin	Director	Director (5 episodes) – "The Cloning of the Green" (1981) – "The Two Faces of Zac" (1981) – "Take My Tonsils...Please!" (1981) – "Change of Venue" (1982) – "I Was a Teenage Loser" (1982)
1982	Herbie, the Love Bug	Director	Director (3 episodes) – "My House Is Your House" – "Calling Doctor Herbie" – "Herbie the Third"
1983	Wizards and Warriors	Director	Director (3 episodes) – "The Unicorn of Death" – "Night of Terror" – "Skies of Death"
1983–1984	Goodnight, Beantown	Director/Executive Producer	Director (3 episodes) – "Hooking for Mr. Goodbar" (1983) – "A Felon Needs a Girl" (1983); also Executive Producer – "Peace on Earth"; Executive Producer (2 episodes) – "An Old Flame Flickers" (1984)
1983	The Best of Times	Director	Television pilot
1984	W*A*L*T*E*R	Director	Television pilot
1984	Dreams	Director/Producer	Director (5 episodes) – "Kiss Me Red"; also Producer – "Boys Are the Best"; also Producer – "Working Life"; also Producer – "Stuttering"; also Producer – "Suspicion"; also Producer; Executive Producer (12 episodes) – "Friends" – "Fortune and Fame" – "Alone" – "Head Over Heels" – "Rusted Dreams" – "Tears in the Night" – "The Birthday Party"
1985	Rockhopper	Director	Television film
1985	I Had Three Wives	Director	Director (3 episodes) – "You and I Know" – " 'Til Death Do Us Part" – "Bedtime Stories" – "Butterfly Murder" – "Runaround Sue"
1986	Better Days	Director	Director (3 episodes) – "Cheaters Never Win" – "Ground Rules" – "Never Blow Up the World"
1987–1988	Sledge Hammer!	Director	Director (8 episodes) – "Play It Again Sledge" (1987) – "Death a Few Salesmen" (1987) – "Hammer Hits the Rock" (1987) – "The Last of the Red Hot Vampires" (1987) – "Icebreaker" (1987) – "Sledge, Rattle 'n' Roll" (1988) – "It Happened What Night?" (1988) – "Here's to You, Mrs. Hammer" (1988)
1988	The Incredible Hulk Returns	Executive Producer	Television film
1988	Some Kinda Woman	Director	Television film
1988	Murphy's Law	Director	Director (2 episodes) – "Where Are My Socks and Other Mysteries of Love" – "Do Someone a Favor and It Becomes Your Job"
1989	The Trial of the Incredible Hulk	Director/Executive Producer	Television film
1989	The Nutt House	Director	Episode: "The Accidental Groom"
1990	The Death of the Incredible Hulk	Director/Executive Producer	Television film
1990	Ferris Bueller	Director	Director (2 episodes) – "Behind Every Dirtbag" – "Baby You Can't Drive My Car"
1991	Sons and Daughters	Director	Episode: "Melanie"
1991	Another Pair of Aces: Three of a Kind	Director	Television film
1991	Man of the People	Director	Episode: "Sleeping with the Enemy"
1991	Baby of the Bride	Director	Television film
1992–1994	Blossom	Director	Director (30 episodes) – "Runaway" (1992) – "Dear Mom" (1992) – "What Price Love?" (1992) – "The Joey Chronicles" (1992) – "Kids" (1992) – "Only When I Laugh" (1992) – "I Killed Chico Barranca" (1992) – "All Hallows Eve" (1992) – "The Making of the President" (1992) – "My Girl" (1992) – "The Frat Party" (1992) – "Losing Your...Religion" (1992) – "Ruby" (1992) – "Time" (1993) – "Mystery Train" (1993) – "The Best Laid Plans of Mice and Men" (1993) – "All Dressed Up" (1993) – "You Did What?" (1993) – "Sitcom" (1993) – "Hunger" (1993) – "Paris" (1993) – "Transitions" (1993) – "Kiss and Tell" (1993) – "Six and Sonny" (1993) – "Blossom's Dilemma" (1993) – "The Fifty-Minute Hour" (1993) – "True Romance" (1993) – "Let's Talk About Sex" (1993) – "Getting Lucky" (1994) – "Meat" (1994)
1993	The Woman Who Loved Elvis	Director	Television film
