= The Magician (American TV series) =

1973 American TV series

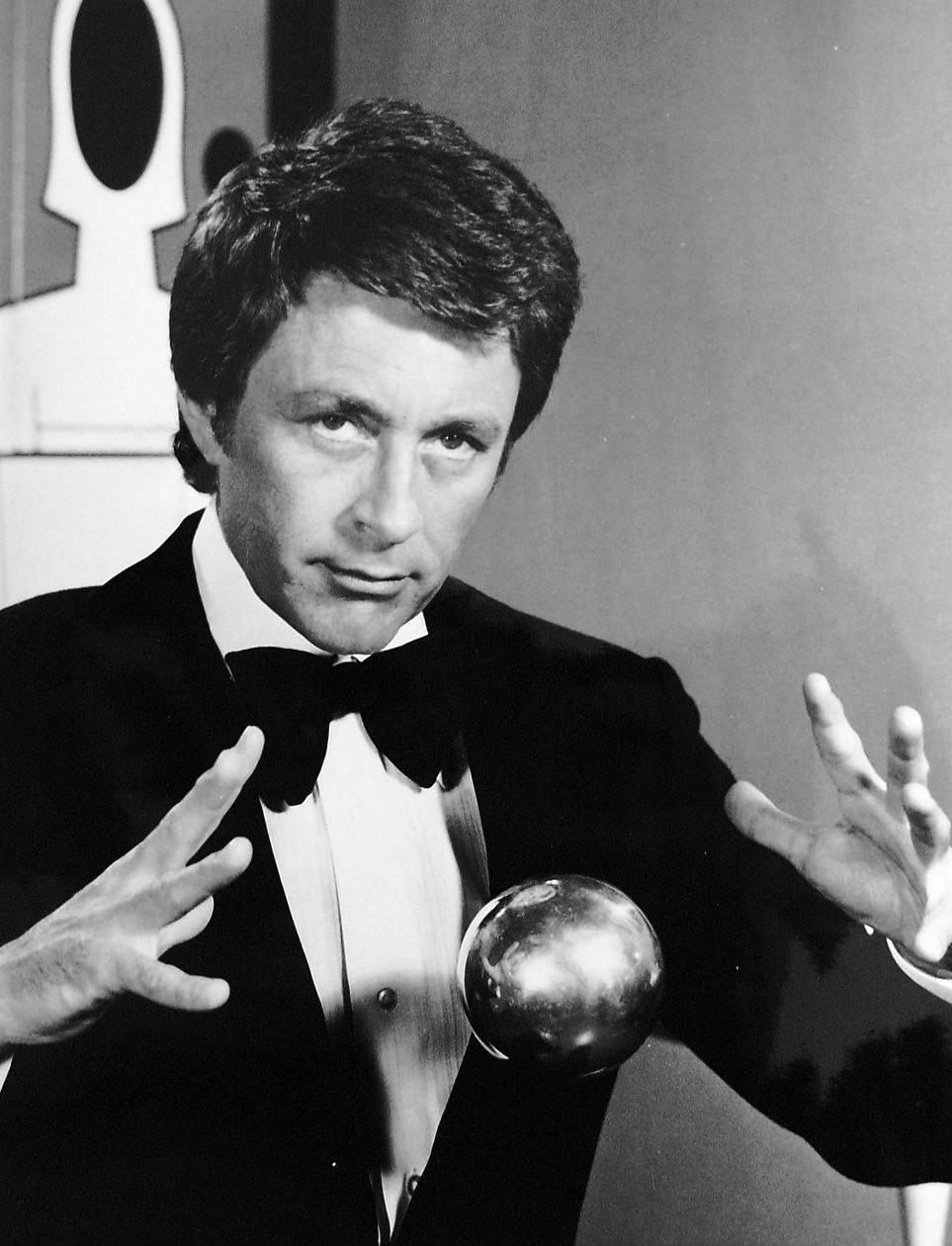
- Bixby as Tony Blake
- Starring: Bill Bixby
- Country of origin: United States
- No. of seasons: 1
- No. of episodes: 21

Production
- Running time: 45 minutes; 70 minutes (pilot episode)
- Production companies: B & B Productions, Inc.; Paramount Television

Original release
- Network: NBC
- Release: March 17, 1973 – April 15, 1974

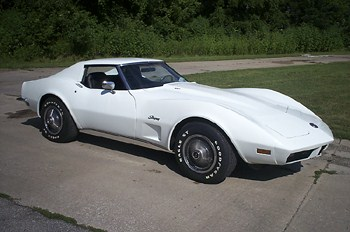
White '73 Corvette C3 like the one in the series, roof closed

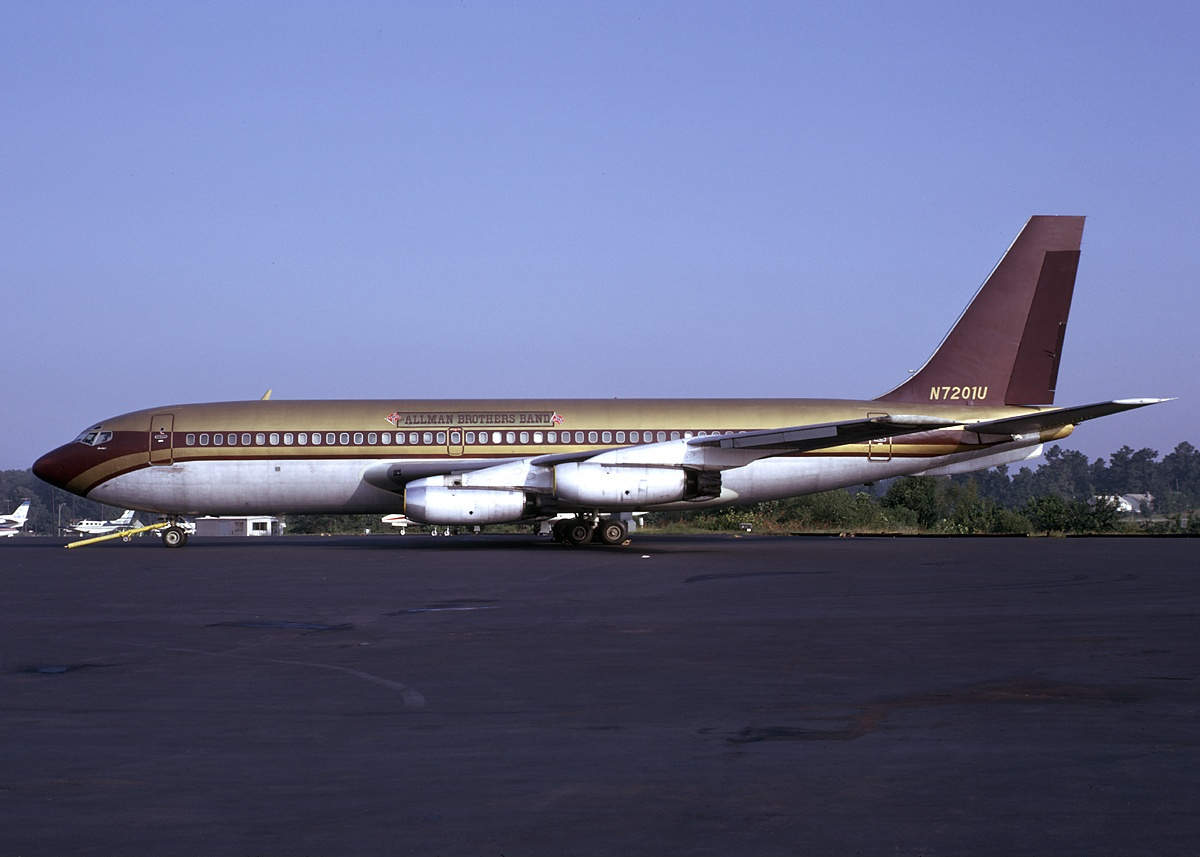
This Boeing 720 called The Starship was used by rock groups touring the US

The Magician is an American television series that ran during the 1973–1974 season. It starred Bill Bixby as stage illusionist Anthony "Tony" Blake, a playboy philanthropist who used his skills to solve difficult crimes as needed. In the series pilot, the character was named Anthony Dorian; the name was changed due to a conflict with the name of a real-life stage magician.

== Plot ==
Blake was a professional stage magician who used his skills to solve crimes and help the helpless. Years earlier, Blake had been in prison on a trumped-up espionage charge in an unnamed country in South America. He discovered a way to escape with his cellmate, which began his interest in escapology. The cellmate died and left him a fortune. The escape, apparently followed by exoneration of the false charges that had led to it, led to Blake's pursuit of a career in stage magic, which made him famous. He never forgot his unjust imprisonment, which motivated him to seek justice for others.

Initially, Blake used a private Boeing jet airliner named The Spirit as a base of operations; it was outfitted as a mobile residence ("It's like any other mobile home, only faster") with live-in pilot Jerry Anderson (Jerry Wallace in the pilot episode, played by the same actor). Blake drove a white '73 Chevrolet Corvette C3 with soft nose, mostly open T-top Targa roof and custom vanity license plates ("SPIRIT") and a car phone, at the time an exotic high-technology feature. Blake frequently received assistance from acerbic columnist Max Pomeroy, and Max's brilliant son Dennis, who used a wheelchair.

Starting with episode 6, the opening credits feature a narrator's voice stating, "All of the magic you're about to see is performed without trick photography of any kind... by Bill Bixby... The Magician".

=== Midseason changes ===
The pilot film showed a twin engine Boeing 737 jet airplane in gold and brown livery, parked on an apron in daylight, with Spirit painted as nose art.

The TV series showed a four engine jet airplane; it was probably the Boeing 720 called The Starship used by touring rock musicians in the 1970s, with gold and brown livery plus band logos from the Led Zeppelin North American Tour in mid 1973 to The Allman Brothers Band in summer of 1974. Then it was painted in US red-white-blue. In addition, the Corvette was shown entering the plane via a rear loading ramp, a feature only available on some dedicated cargo aircraft, but not on the Boeing 720, even when converted to freighter.

Midway through the program's run, the idea of the jet airplane mobile home was dropped and Blake took up residence in an upmarket apartment at The Magic Castle, a real club devoted to magic acts in Los Angeles, California. At the same time, the supporting cast of the show was replaced with a new, single character, Dominick, a somewhat comical sidekick. No explanation for the changes was given in the series. Jerry continued to make occasional minor appearances, and Tony recruited Jerry and Max together for one further case in the new format.

== Cast ==
=== Episodes 1–13 ===
- Bill Bixby as Anthony Blake (named Anthony Dorian in the pilot episode)
- Keene Curtis as Max Pomeroy
- Jim Watkins as Jerry Anderson (named Jerry Wallace in the pilot)

=== Episodes 13–21 ===
- Bill Bixby as Anthony Blake
- Joseph Sirola as Dominick

Some episodes feature Larry Anderson, who later created the JawDroppers video magic course, as Blake's assistant. Todd Crespi also made some appearances as Max's son Dennis.

== Production ==
=== Magic on the program ===
Bixby, a keen amateur magician, insisted on performing all of the illusions in person, without any trick photography, although it was not possible for this to be the case in the TV-movie/pilot. Many of the episodes of the regular series were preceded by an announcement that the magic tricks were accomplished without trick photography. He was instructed in these performances by the program's technical advisor, Mark Wilson, who was credited as "magic consultant". Bixby said, "I was a catalyst for the magic of Mark [Wilson] and Larry Anderson. They deserve the applause." Once the format changed to have the hero based in a magic club, Wilson could occasionally be seen on the stage there, as well. In addition to escapes, Bixby performed feats of sleight of hand, mentalism, and stage illusions. After the series' cancellation, Bixby went on to host a string of magic specials on NBC and a series, The Wonderful World of Magic, in first-run syndication.

== Reception ==
The Magician ranked 47th out of 80 shows during the 1973–74 season, with an average 17.6 household rating.

== Pilot ==
No.	Title	Directed by	Written by	Original release date
0	"The Magician"	Marvin J. Chomsky	Laurence Heath, Joseph Stefano	March 17, 1973

== Episodes ==
No.	Title	Directed by	Written by	Original release date
1	"The Manhunters"	Sutton Roley	Jimmy Sangster	October 2, 1973
Someone is trying to kill Max Pomeroy (Keene Curtis), Tony Blake's friend. The investigation leads Blake to an alcoholic lady gambler in distress and the plot thickens in a casino.: Guest Stars Marlyn Mason [Diane Thomson]; Stephen McNally [Manning Hargrove]; Co-Starring Vincent Beck [Stanley Owens] Scott Walker [hired killer]; Featuring Mort Thompson as Driscoll Lenore Stevens as Edith David Brandon as Reporter #1 Marcia Mae Jones as Woman Tony Cristino as Chief Box Man Sandra Wirth as Casino Cashier And Special Appearance By Jerry Quarry as Al; Uncredited: George Holmes [customer in casino], Cosmo Sardo [croupier in casino]
2	"The Vanishing Lady"	Marvin Chomsky	Harold Livingston	October 9, 1973
When Julie Carter, the singer in Tony Blake's Vegas magic act and personal friend, is kidnapped in her dressing room, the magician has to race against time to save her.: Guest Stars Peter Brown [Ray Weaver]; Amanda McBroom [Julie Carter]; Ramon Bieri [Police Lieutenant Phil Corcoran]; Co-Starring John Karlen [Jim Russell] Lilyan Chauvin [Anna] Lenore Kasdorf [Jane Roberts]; Featuring Byron Mabe as Tarlow Patti Elder as Woman Driver And Special Appearance By Craig Morton as Sgt. Drake
3	"Illusion in Terror"	Paul Krasny	Walter Brough	October 23, 1973
A car accident sees Tony Blake's girlfriend Joanna taken by ambulance and soon pronounced dead but the body has vanished. Suspecting foul play, Blake investigates Joanna's past and what he finds endangers his own life.: Guest Stars Cameron Mitchell [Canfield / Marsh]; Brenda Benét [Joanna Osborne]; Special Guest Star Macdonald Carey [Rich]; Co-Starring Tom Geas [Malcolm Gregorian] Bill Zuckert [Matt Osborne] Barbara Collentine [Hannah Osborne]; Featuring Carleton Young as Minister John Pickard as Sheriff Sturdivant Jerry Strickler as Deputy Harold Claudio Martinez as Luis Tony Cristino as Chief Box Man Sonja Dunson as Nurse; Uncredited: Chuck Hicks [hired killer]
4	"Lightning on a Dry Day"	Reza S. Badiyi	Walter Brough	October 30, 1973
A hospital patient is spooked senseless by the fire in one of Tony's charity magic acts. His investigation into the young man's past leads him to a small town riddled with suspicious residents.: Guest Stars Neville Brand [Sheriff Platt]; Geoffrey Deuel [Vic Reiser]; Special Guest Star Beah Richards [Mrs. Thatcher]; Co-Starring Mark Hamill [Ian Keefer] Susan Foster [Maggie Platt] Frances Reid [Eleanor Gilpin] Quinn Redeker [Doctor Sebring]; Featuring George Wallace as Steve Yates Kurt Grayson as Tom Leigh Hamilton as Nurse Owens Camiey Gwyn Sebring as Magician's Assistant
5	"Ovation for Murder"	Barry Crane	Walter Brough	November 6, 1973
During a backyard party where Tony Blake performs, the magician witnesses a Greek man he rescued earlier shoot another man. Blake suspects he was impaired and arranges an elaborate illusion in a hospital to catch the real killer.: Guest Stars Jack Kruschen [Albie Allikolos]; Susan Oliver [Susanna]; Walter Brooke [Orin Connover]; Co-Starring Roy Jenson [Frank Letterman] Wesley Lau [Captain Gottschalk]; Featuring Sid Grossfeld as Ulricht Dennis Cross as Guard Colton John Craig as Guard Morrison Eddy C. Dyer as Guard Troy; Uncredited: Candice Rialson [assistant in Tony's magic act]
6	"Man on Fire"	Reza S. Badiyi	Story by : Sam Roeca & James L. Henderson; Teleplay by : Sam Roeca & James L. Henderson and Juanita Bartlett	November 20, 1973
While arguing with her boyfriend, a woman falls down stairs and dies. The man is coerced into stuffing her body in a trunk and tossing it in a lake. Tony Blake gets involved when bad guys come after his new magic student, the man's son.: Guest Stars Carl Betz [Paul Ryerson]; Lloyd Bochner [Matt Matthews]; Brad David [Danny Ryerson]; Co-Starring Jane Merrow [Carol Spain / Lorna Hackett]; Featuring Erik Holland as Gruber Wayne Heffley as Sheriff Harris Miguel Landa as Lt. Sanchez Barry Cahill as Browning
7	"Lady in a Trap"	Leslie H. Martinson	Story by : Frank Telford; Teleplay by : Frank Telford and Marion Hargrove	November 27, 1973
Out scuba diving, Tony Blake rescues a ditzy assistant library curator he met earlier whose boyfriend tossed her off his yacht with intention to kill. An old copy of The Prince becomes the pivotal point of Blake's investigation.: Guest Stars Robert Webber [Arthur Zellman]; Kristina Holland [Stacy McGranahan]; Co-Starring William Jordan [Sheriff Sanders] Anthony Eisley [Ralph Turner]; Featuring Rob Townsend as Haney Brad Trumbull as Lt. Moore Tom Dever as Teddy Gail B. Cameron as Receptionist
8	"The Man Who Lost Himself"	Sutton Roley	Marion Hargrove	December 11, 1973
A man fleeing pursuers crashes into Tony Blake's stage, sending both of them to the hospital. The man wakes up amnesiac and Blake enlists his friends to help the man recover his memory.: Guest Stars Joe Flynn [George Blaisdell]; Yvonne Craig [Doctor Nora Zabriskie]; George Murdock (actor) [Timothy Dunagan] Hal Williams [Jonathan Gordon] Pamela Britton [Betty Foster]; Co-Starring John Milford [Stan Lubie] Yuki Shimoda [Father Fred] Russell Thorson [Alex Nicholson]; Featuring Joe Perry as Matchek Johnny Lee as The Grandson Allen Joseph as Ticket Seller; Uncredited: Larry Anderson [stage magician]
9	"Nightmare in Steel"	Reza Badiyi	Story by : Shimon Wincelberg; Teleplay by : Walter Brough & Shimon Wincelberg	December 18, 1973
The husband of Tony Blake's clumsy new assistant has been kidnapped and is being forced to help hijack a tanker. Tony infiltrates the tanker to rescue the man and avert the crime before it's too late. Leif Erickson, Christopher Stone and Anne Randall guest star.
10	"Shattered Image"	Michael O'Herlihy	Richard Hesse	January 8, 1974
Tony Blake must protect a little girl who is targeted by her father's former mob associates. In the process, Tony attempts to clear the man's name who himself is on the run, framed for murder. Joseph Campanella, Ed Gilbert and Leslie Parrish guest star.
11	"The Illusion of the Curious Counterfeit: Part 1"	Sutton Roley	Laurence Heath	January 14, 1974
Performing at the Magic Castle, Tony notices his ex-girlfriend in the audience, looking distraught. A man behind her is acting strange. Tony invites her onstage and makes her vanish but the bad guy is fast on their trail. Carol Lynley, John Colicos, L.Q. Jones and Lloyd Nolan guest star.
12	"The Illusion of the Curious Counterfeit: Part 2"	Sutton Roley	Laurence Heath	January 21, 1974
When his attempt to free his ex-girlfriend from a cell fails, Tony has a confrontation with her ex-mobster father. Carol Lynley, John Colicos and Barbara Rhoades guest star.
13	"The Illusion of the Stainless Steel Lady"	Alexander Singer	Story by : Richard Hesse; Teleplay by : Paul Playdon & Richard Hesse	January 28, 1974
Tony investigates the self-enforced isolation of his old, recluse movie-star friend, Irene Denore (Nina Foch), after an attractive blonde claiming to be her estranged granddaughter asks him for help. Anthony Zerbe, Edward Winter and Mark Lenard guest star.
14	"The Illusion of the Queen's Gambit"	Don Weis	Edward J. Lakso	February 4, 1974
Tony is performing onboard the Queen Mary when masked robbers interrupt his act. His friend, Ed Cassidy (William Shatner), is blamed for the robbery and Tony Blake sets out to prove his innocence. Brooke Bundy, Paul Mantee and Katherine Justice guest star.
15	"The Illusion of Black Gold"	Arnold Laven	Edward J. Lakso	February 11, 1974
Tony stages an elaborate illusion to fake the death of a political-defector scientist who can extract oil from shale rock, but the scientist is kidnapped and auctioned off to the highest bidder. Eric Braeden, Milton Selzer, Michael Cristofer and Lynda Day George guest star.
16	"The Illusion of the Lost Dragon"	Alexander Singer	Howard Berk	February 18, 1974
In order to find a jade dragon which has been stolen from his very old friend in Chinatown, Tony will have to face the threat of a horrible death in a lava pit when the floor is literally taken from under him. Soon-Tek Oh, France Nuyen, Joseph Wiseman and Philip Ahn guest star.
17	"The Illusion of the Deadly Conglomerate"	David Moessinger	David Moessinger	February 25, 1974
Tony reconnects with a homeless old magician friend; the shelter where he's landed specializes in murdering the downtrodden for profit and it's up to the magician to rescue him before it's too late. Eugene Roche, Jack Ging, Michele Marsh and William Sylvester guest star.
18	"The Illusion of the Fatal Arrow"	Leslie H. Martinson	Paul Playdon & David Chase	March 4, 1974
In order to prevent further murders by a hitman who uses a bow and arrow, Tony partners with a psychic who accurately predicted the first victim's death. Jeremy Slate, Pamela Franklin and Tim Matheson guest star.
19	"The Illusion of the Lethal Playthings"	Jack Arnold	Larry Brody	March 18, 1974
Someone is trying to kill a friend of Tony Blake's by detonating bombs and using marionettes and remote controlled toys. Tony's investigation brings him to a toy shop and he becomes the target of the mad man. Scott Hylands, Louis Hayward, Joanna Miles and Simon Scott guest star.
20	"The Illusion of the Cat's Eye"	Paul Stanley	David Chase & Paul Playdon	March 25, 1974
A museum enlists Tony Blake's help to investigate the "smoke & mirrors" theft of a highly guarded Egyptian cat statue. Joseph Ruskin, Marianna Hill, John Dehner and Claudette Nevins guest star.
21	"The Illusion of the Evil Spikes"	Bill Bixby	David Moessinger	April 15, 1974
A magician is killed during the filming of a highly risky magic trick. Blake takes on both the investigation and his friend's place in recreating the Table of Death illusion for the cameras. Jessica Walter, Lew Ayres and Herbert Anderson guest star.

== Home media ==
Visual Entertainment released the complete series on DVD in Region 1 on August 25, 2017.

== Influence ==
Though it ran only a single season, The Magician was an influence on later series. The show was a favorite of The X-Files creator Chris Carter, who worked it into Special Agent Fox Mulder's "origin" story: a teenaged Mulder was waiting to watch The Magician when his sister Samantha was abducted by mysterious forces.

In the Quantum Leap episode "The Great Spontini", Scott Bakula's character, Dr. Sam Beckett, leaps into an amateur magician in 1974 who aspires to appear on Bill Bixby's The Magician; however, owing to his partial amnesia, Dr. Beckett, at first, can only recall Bixby's connection with The Incredible Hulk, which had not been made at that time.

The Incredible Hulk series featured an episode that paid homage to both The Magician and Bixby's earlier series, My Favorite Martian. In The Incredible Hulk's "My Favorite Magician" episode, Bixby's character became the temporary apprentice to a stage magician played by Bixby's Martian co-star, Ray Walston. Mark Wilson was on hand again as the episode's "magic consultant" as well. In addition, Martian co-star Pamela Britton appeared in an episode of The Magician.

Actor Andrew Robinson has stated that his Star Trek: Deep Space Nine character, Elim Garak, was partially influenced by Bixby's character.
