= Brandon Cruz =

American actor, musician, drug and alcohol recovery specialist

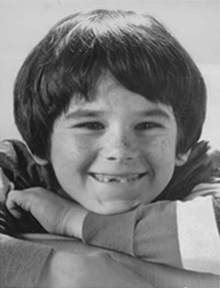
- Brandon Cruz, circa 1969.
- Born: Brandon Edwin Williams; May 28, 1962 (age 64); Bakersfield, California, U.S.
- Occupations: Actor, singer, editor, consultant
- Known for: The Courtship of Eddie's Father
- Spouse: Elizabeth "Liz" Finkelstein (div. 2018)
- Children: 2, including Ruby Cruz

Brandon Cruz (born Brandon Edwin Williams on May 28, 1962) is an American musician, actor, editor and consultant. He is best known as a child actor for his role as Eddie Corbett, son of widower Tom Corbett (played by Bill Bixby), on the television series The Courtship of Eddie's Father. Cruz is also a punk rock musician, having sung for bands such as Dr. Know and the reunited version of the Dead Kennedys.

== Early life ==
Cruz was born in Bakersfield, California, U.S., to Mexican-American parents. When he was two months old, the family moved to Silver Strand Beach in Oxnard, California.

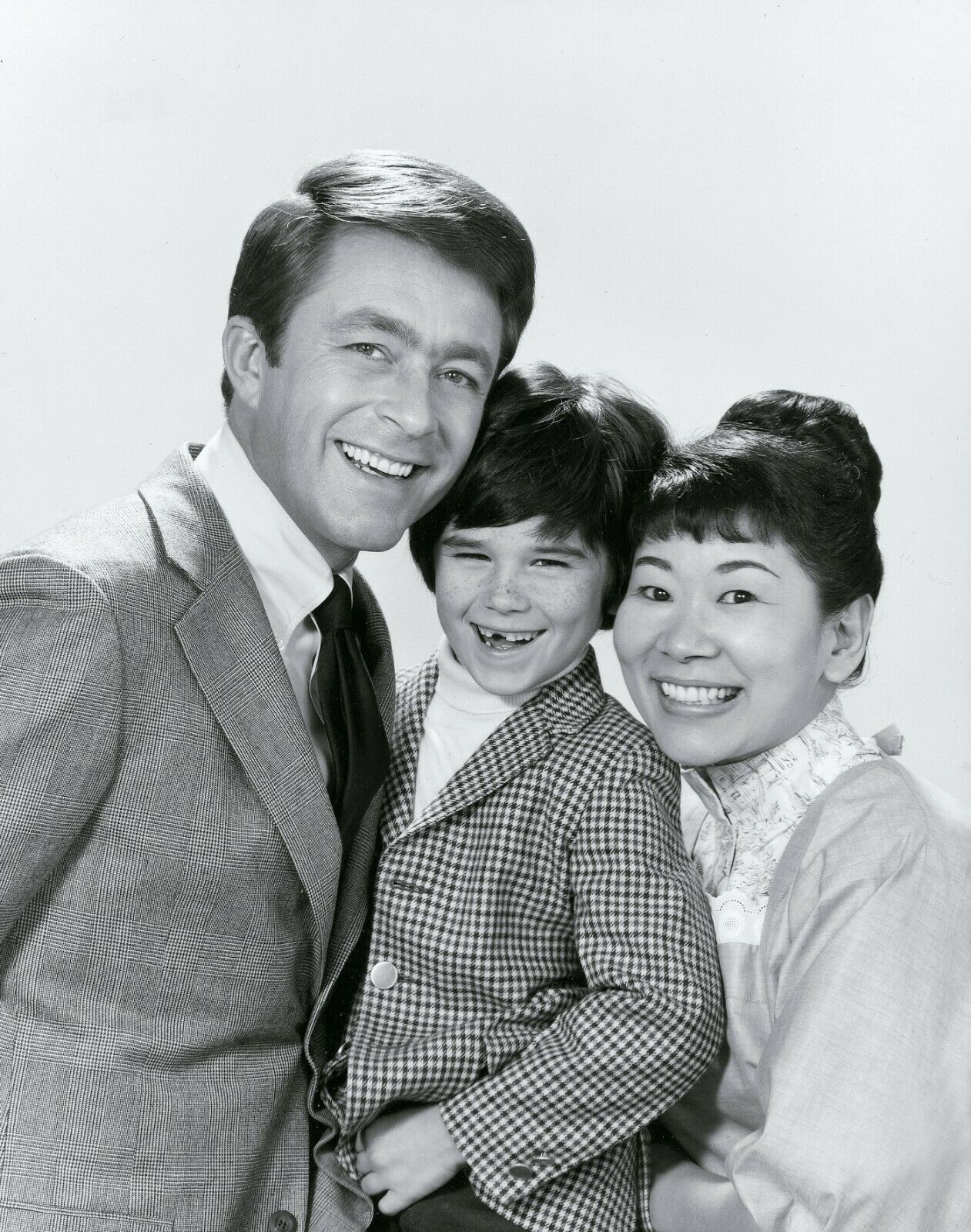
Cruz (center) with The Courtship of Eddie's Father co-stars Bill Bixby and Miyoshi Umeki

== Career ==
=== Acting ===
At age seven, he auditioned for and won his breakthrough role as Eddie Corbett in the television series The Courtship of Eddie's Father, which aired from 1969 to 1972. Co-star Bill Bixby and Cruz spent considerable time together, especially when the show was on hiatus, prompting Cruz to tell American Profile magazine "Bill Bixby was like my second father."

Cruz continued as a child actor for several years following the cancellation of The Courtship of Eddie's Father with a number of guest appearances in television shows like Kung Fu, Gunsmoke, and The Incredible Hulk—which reunited him on-screen with Bixby. Cruz also played the role of Joey Turner in the 1976 movie The Bad News Bears.

=== Music ===
Cruz turned his attention to punk rock in the late 1970s, and in 1981 was performing with the hardcore punk band Dr. Know. The group released several records, and after a name change to KNOW, toured Europe in 2017. Cruz also was the lead vocalist with Dead Kennedys from 2001 until 2003. Cruz was interviewed in the documentary American Hardcore: The History of American Punk Rock, 1980–1986. Reflecting on life after being a child star, which has brought tragedy to so many others, Cruz told American Profile "Surfing and punk rock probably saved my life."

=== Editing ===
Cruz has worked behind-the-scenes in television and film, such as an assistant editor on the animated series South Park. He later worked for the United Paramount Network, the Discovery Channel and American Chopper.

== Honors and awards ==
In 1991, Cruz was honored by the Young Artist Foundation with its Young Artist Former Child Star Lifetime Achievement Award for his role as Eddie on The Courtship of Eddie's Father.

== Personal life ==
Cruz and nurse Elizabeth "Liz" Finkelstein were married in 1994. They divorced in 2018. They have a son, Lincoln Bixby Cruz (born 1995), and a daughter, actress Ruby Jean Cruz (born 2000). Cruz now works as a consultant to people suffering from addictions and is a practicing Buddhist. A book on his life is in the early stages.

== Filmography ==
Year	Title	Role	Notes
1969	80 Steps to Jonah	Little Joe	
1969–1972	The Courtship of Eddie's Father	Eddie Corbett	73 episodes
1970	But I Don't Want to Get Married!	Bernard	ABC Movie of the Week
1972	Gunsmoke	Jimmy Morgan	Episode: "The Drummer"
1972	Kung Fu	Peter Gideon	Season 1, Episode 1: "King of the Mountain"
1973	Medical Center	Mooch	Episode: "Night Cry"
1973	The Going Up of David Lev	David	Television movie
1973	Love, American Style	Ernie	Segment "Love and the Unsteady Steady"
1974	Family Theatre: Married Is Better		Television movie
1974	Police Story	Victor Rollins	Episode: "Cop in the Middle"
1974	Doc Elliot	Robert Wells	Episode: "A Time to Grow"
1976	The Bad News Bears	Joey Turner	
1976	Jeremiah of Jacob's Neck	Clay Rankin	Television movie
1976	ABC Afterschool Special	Benny Singleton	Episode: "Mighty Moose and the Quarterback Kid"
1978	The One and Only	Sherman	
1978	The Incredible Hulk	Kevin	Episode: "747"
1995	Safe	Steve	
1997	Jesus Rides Shotgun	Chintz	
1998	Beyond Belief: Fact or Fiction		Episode: "The Card Game"
2004	Eddie's Father	Slice	
2012	The Lords of Salem	Ted Delta	
