= Brenda Benet =

American actress (1945–1982)

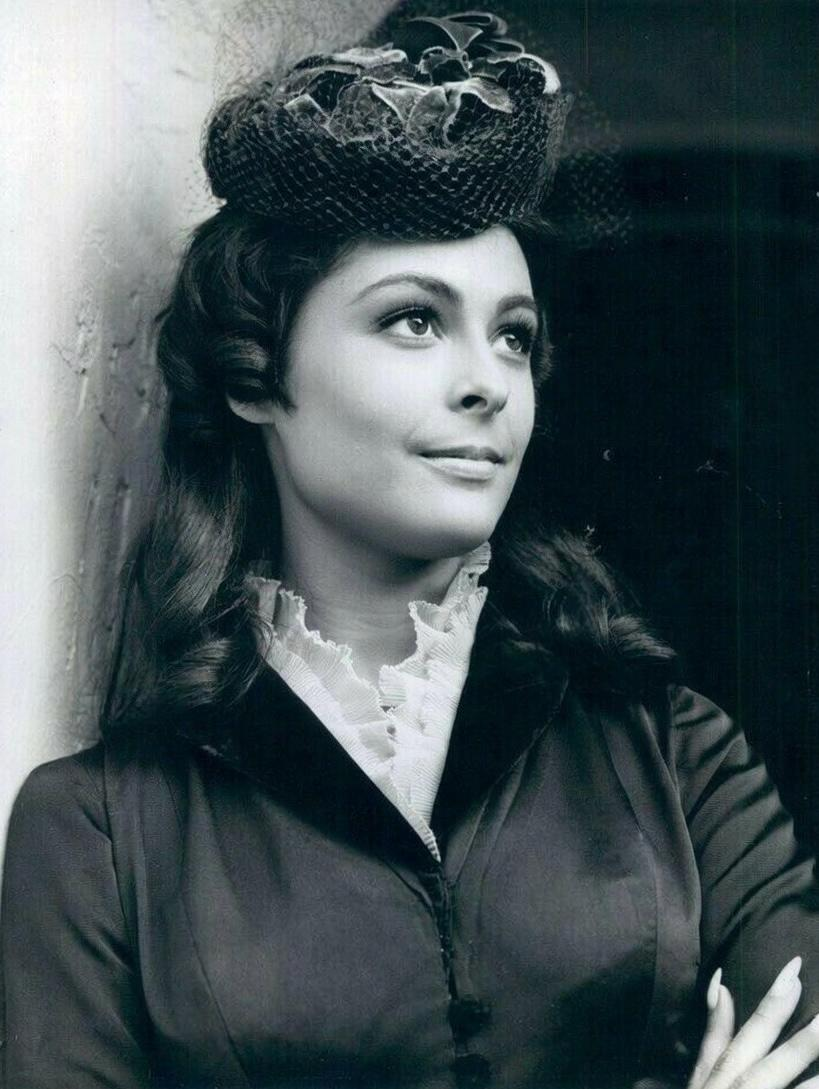
- Benet in The High Chaparral, 1969
- Born: Brenda Ann Nelson; August 14, 1945; Los Angeles, California, U.S.
- Died: April 7, 1982 (aged 36); Los Angeles, California, U.S.
- Cause of death: Suicide by gunshot
- Occupation: Actress
- Years active: 1964–1982
- Spouses: Paul Petersen (m. 1967; div. 1970) Bill Bixby (m. 1971; div. 1980)
- Partner: Tammy Bruce (1980–1982)
- Children: 1

Brenda Benet (born Brenda Ann Nelson; August 14, 1945 – April 7, 1982) was an American actress. She was best known for her roles on the soap operas The Young Marrieds (1965–1965) and Days of Our Lives (1979–1982). She was also featured in an episode of Hogan's Heroes in 1968.

== Early life ==
Benet was born Brenda Ann Nelson in Hollywood, Los Angeles, California; later, her family moved to South Gate. She graduated from South Gate High School, attended Los Angeles City College, then studied at the University of California at Los Angeles, majoring in languages. She studied with San Francisco Ballet, was featured in several productions of the Los Angeles Civic Light Opera, was a musician who played piano, flute and violin, and was fluent in five languages.

== Career ==
Her first acting roles were in 1964, with appearances on Shindig! and The Young Marrieds. She eventually became an actress very much in demand for roles in episodic primetime television in the 1960s and 1970s, including I Dream of Jeannie, McHale's Navy, Daniel Boone, Mannix, The Green Hornet (TV series), My Three Sons, Hogan's Heroes, Love, American Style, Wonder Woman, The Love Boat, and The Courtship of Eddie's Father. She also had a major role in the feature film Walking Tall (1973).

She portrayed Lee DuMonde on the daytime serial Days of Our Lives, a role she played from 1979 until her death in 1982.

== Personal life ==
Benet's first marriage was to The Donna Reed Show actor Paul Petersen in 1967. In 1969, Benet left Petersen for actor Bill Bixby.

After her divorce from Petersen became final, Benet married Bixby in 1971. The couple had a child, Christopher Sean, in September 1974, and then divorced in 1980.

In 1980, Benet became lovers with her 17-year-old personal secretary, Tammy Bruce. Later, Benet and Bruce lived together for nearly a year before Bruce moved out in early 1982.

Benet experienced a number of personal and professional challenges after her divorce from Bixby. Her role on Days of Our Lives made her extremely unpopular with fans; Benet's character was breaking up one of the show's popular couples, Doug and Julie, and fans were outraged. However, Benet's most personal challenge occurred when her six-year-old son Christopher died in March 1981. While they were on a weekend ski trip at Mammoth Lakes, Christopher suffered acute epiglottitis, going into a coma and cardiac arrest after doctors subsequently carried out a tracheotomy.

== Death ==
Benet was devastated by her son's death and sank into a severe depression. On April 7, 1982, she died of a self-inflicted gunshot wound at her home in Los Angeles. She was 36.

== Filmography ==
Film
Year	Title	Role	Notes
1965	Beach Ball	Samantha	
1965	Harum Scarum	Emerald	Alternative title: Harum Holiday
1967	Track of Thunder	Shelly Newman	
1973	Walking Tall	Luan Paxton	Listed in credits as Brenda Benét
Television
Year	Title	Role	Notes
1964	Wendy and Me	Shamir	1 episode
1965	McHale's Navy	Karema	1 episode
1965–1966	The Young Marrieds	Jill McComb #4	Unknown episodes
1966	The Girl from U.N.C.L.E.	Gizelle	1 episode
1966	Daniel Boone	Princess Little Fawn	1 episode
1966–1970	My Three Sons	Elyse; Maureen	2 episodes
1967	The Iron Horse	Kitty Clayborne	1 episode
1967	The Green Hornet	Girl	1 episode
1967	I Dream of Jeannie	Eleanor	1 episode
1968–1969	It Takes a Thief	Nicole; Angela Peters	2 episodes
1968–1970	Hogan's Heroes	Janine Robinet; Marie Bizet	3 episodes
1969	The High Chaparral	Anita de Santiago y Amistad	1 episode
1969	To Rome With Love	Tina	1 episode
1969	The F.B.I.	Stewardess	1 episode
1969–1972	Love, American Style		3 episodes
1970	Death Valley Days	Chela	1 episode
1970	Paris 7000		1 episode
1971	The Most Deadly Game	Mindy	1 episode
1971	The Courtship of Eddie's Father	Brenda	1 episode
1971	The Men From Shiloh, the rebranded name of The Virginian	Susan Masters	1 episode
1971–1975	Mannix	Ellen Parrish (S4-Ep16); Edie	2 episodes
1972	Wednesday Night Out		Television movie
1972	Search	Carol Lesko	1 episode
1973	The Horror at 37,000 Feet	Sally	Television movie
1973	The Magician	Joanna Marsh / Osborne	1 episode
1976	Tattletales	Herself	5 episodes
1977	The Love Boat	Maureen Mitchell	1 episode
1978	Wonder Woman	Morgana	1 episode
1978	Fantasy Island	Ginny Winthrop	1 episode
1979	Carter Country	Natalya	1 episode
1979–1982	Days of Our Lives	Lee DuMonde Carmichael Williams	255 episodes
1980	The Incredible Hulk	Annie Caplan	1 episode
1982	Father Murphy	Rachel Hansen	1 episode, (final appearance)
