= The Funky Phantom =

Australian animated television series

- Genre: Comedy; Mystery; Adventure
- Created by: William Hanna; Joseph Barbera
- Directed by: William Hanna; Joseph Barbera
- Voices of: Daws Butler; Tommy Cook; Jerry Dexter; Micky Dolenz; Kristina Holland; Don Messick
- Composer: John Sangster
- Countries of origin: United States; Australia
- No. of seasons: 1
- No. of episodes: 17

Production
- Producers: William Hanna; Joseph Barbera
- Running time: 22 minutes
- Production companies: Hanna-Barbera Productions; Air Programs International

Original release
- Network: ABC
- Release: September 11, 1971 – January 1, 1972

The Funky Phantom is an American-Australian Saturday morning animated television series, produced by Hanna-Barbera Productions, in association with Australian production company Air Programs International for the American Broadcasting Company (ABC). The show was a clone of Hanna-Barbera's popular Scooby-Doo, Where Are You!, with a trio of teenage detectives driving around the country and solving crimes. In this case, the "Scooby-Doo" role was taken by a Revolutionary War-era ghost, voiced by Daws Butler in a manner almost identical to that of Snagglepuss.

Reruns of the show ran during the 1972 season and, briefly, in 1980, as part of Hanna-Barbera's Godzilla series.

== Plot ==
Trying to find shelter from a storm while driving their "Looney Duney" dune buggy, three teenagers — brainy redhead Skip Gilroy, beautiful blonde April Stewart, and Skip's brawny dark-haired best friend, Augie Anderson — and his dog Elmo, entered an old house where a grandfather clock displayed an incorrect time. Upon setting the clock to midnight, it released two Revolutionary War-era ghosts: an American patriot named Jonathan Wellington Muddlemore, whom the kids call "Mudsy", and his cat Boo. The two explained that, during the Revolutionary War, they had stumbled upon two Redcoats so they hid inside the clock. They evaded discovery, but they were unable to get out of the clock and eventually died inside. After being freed by their new friends, Mudsy and Boo have accompanied them on many mysteries, providing invisible assistance.

This set-up shows a certain similarity to the 1946 Abbott and Costello film The Time of Their Lives, in which two Revolutionary War-era ghosts are also held earth-bound due to a secret hidden in a clock.

== Production ==
The character voice of Mudsy was provided by Daws Butler and was identical to his voice work for Snagglepuss, down to the use of Snagglepuss's catchphrase, "...even". Butler's Snagglepuss voice was originally an impersonation of comedian Bert Lahr.

Like many animated series created by Hanna-Barbera in the 1970s, the show contained a studio-created laugh track, and indeed, it was one of the first such productions to do so. Syndicated versions, on Cartoon Network and Boomerang have the track muted.

== Cast ==
=== Main ===
- Daws Butler as Jonathan Wellington "Mudsy" Muddlemore, Fingers (in "Pigskin Predicament")
- Tommy Cook as Augie Anderson
- Micky Dolenz as Skip Gilroy
- Kristina Holland as April Stewart
- Don Messick as Elmo the Dog, Boo the Cat, Farmer Higgins (in "Don't Fool with a Phantom"), Raven/Otis Carter (in "Don't Fool with a Phantom"), Chickenman/Mr. Angus (in "Who's Chicken"), Ichabod Crane (in "The Headless Horseman"), Mayor (in "We Saw a Sea Serpent"), Packy (in "We Saw a Sea Serpent"), Ghost/Bill Sands (in "Haunt in Inn"), Hotel Guest (in "Haunt in Inn"), Lifeguard (in "Haunted in Inn"), Spirit of '76/Hank Miller (in "Mudsy and Muddlemore Manor")

=== Additional voices ===
- Julie Bennett as Lori Elwood (in "The Headless Horseman")
- Jerry Dexter as Richard Travers (in "The Headless Horseman")
- Casey Kasem as Professor Lundgren (In "Spirit Spooked"), Winfield Wheely (in "April's Foolish Day")
- Jim MacGeorge
- Allan Melvin as Mayor Iversen (in "Mudsy and Muddlemore Manor")
- Barney Phillips as Ghost of Montezuma (in "Spirit Spooked")
- Mike Road as Henchman (in "I'll Haunt You Later"), Blackie (in "Ghost Town Ghost")
- Hal Smith as Ringo (in "Ghost Town Ghost"), Houndman/Barkley (in "The Hairy Scary Houndsman")
- John Stephenson as Ghost of Jean Lafitte/Malcolm Rogers (in "I'll Haunt You Later"), Headless Horseman (in "The Headless Horseman"), Gas Station Attendant (in "We Saw a Sea Serpent"), Black Lake Creature (in "We Saw a Sea Serpent"), Mr. Warnock (in "We Saw a Sea Serpent"), Hugo (in "Haunt in Inn"), Ghost of Widow Wilson's Inn (in "Haunt in Inn"), Parafiend (in "The Liberty Bell Caper"), Slippery Stark (in "Ghost Grabbers")
- George Tyler
- Janet Waldo as Widow Wilson (in "Haunt in Inn")
- Lennie Weinrib (uncredited) as Ichabod Crane (in “The Headless Horseman”)and The Headless Horseman (in “The Headless Horseman”)

== Episodes ==
No.	Title	Original release date
1	"Don't Fool With a Phantom"	September 11, 1971
Mudsy comes to the aid of Farmer Higgens when a mysterious villain called the Raven has been sabotaging the barnyard in order to claim the property. When the group plans to enter a local cross-country race for the money to pay off the mortgage, the Raven plans to sabotage their attempts.
2	"Heir Scare"	September 18, 1971
The Looney Duney gets lost in a swamp and they end up outside of Conway Mansion. They end up aiding Michael Conway when he is stalked by a Marsh monster that is after the Conway fortune.
3	"I'll Haunt You Later"	September 25, 1971
Skip, April, Augie, and Mudsy stumble onto an abandoned truck somewhere in the swamp. While looking for the driver, they stumble onto a castle that is haunted by the Ghost of Jean Lafitte.
4	"Who's Chicken"	October 2, 1971
Chickenman steals a shipment of chickens bound for Chicken Delicious owned by April's Uncle Henry.
5	"The Headless Horseman"	October 9, 1971
The Looney Duney gets a flat tire outside of Sleepy Hollow. Skip, April, Augie, and Mudsy encounter the Headless Horseman who is targeting a descendant of Ichabod Crane.
6	"Spirit Spooked"	October 16, 1971
While competing in a race in Mexico, The Funky Phantom Gang is stopped by the ghost of Montezuma and a Sun God. They also meet two men who both claim to be the archaeologist Professor Lundgren.
7	"Ghost Town Ghost"	October 23, 1971
The Looney Duney arrives in the western town of Plainville where its 50 Year Frontier Celebration is crashed by two outlaws named Ringo and Blackie, who are disguised as Bob Dalton and Jesse James.
8	"We Saw a Sea Serpent"	October 30, 1971
Mudsy, Skip, Augie, and April learn about a sea serpent called the Black Lake Creature which is scaring away the locals near Black Lake. They are unaware that Mr. Warnock and his minion Packy are using the Black Lake Creature for their own personal reasons.
9	"Haunt in Inn"	November 6, 1971
Mudsy, Skip, Augie, and April end up staying at Widow Wilson's Inn, which is haunted by a ghost that has been scaring away its customers.
10	"Mudsy Joins the Circus"	November 13, 1971
Mudsy, Skip, Augie, and April visit the Barnaby Bros. Circus where they spot a gorilla robbing the circus. They suspect that the circus's gorilla Gigantua is behind this and eventually discover that the gorilla in question is connected to a counterfeiting operation.
11	"Pigskin Predicament"	November 20, 1971
The football playoff game between Central High and Westside is interrupted when criminals Fingers and Lefty steal the $1,000,000 necklace of Brockton Van Cleef and store it inside a football, which ends up in a mix-up upon colliding with the Central High team. Now Fingers and Lefty plan to reclaim the football containing the necklace by posing as members of the other team.
12	"The Liberty Bell Caper"	November 27, 1971
The Parafiend has stolen the original U.S. flag made by Betsy Ross and leaves a poem riddle for his next caper. Mudsy, Skip, Augie, and April figure out that the Parafiend is after the Liberty Bell.
13	"April's Foolish Day"	December 4, 1971
Mudsy, Skip, Augie, and April enter the Looney Duney in the Desert Race. Known racer Winfield Wheely is hired to ride the Road Hog Roadster by Cyrus Road Hog, and Winfield Wheely ends up taking April as his navigator. Yet Cyrus Road Hog has his own plans for winning the race.
14	"The Forest's Prime-Evil"	December 11, 1971
While in the Sequoia National Forest, Mudsy, Skip, Augie, and April end up camping out there. The next morning, the group find tracks left by Bigfoot and end up stumbling upon an illegal logging activity.
15	"The Hairy Scary Houndman"	December 18, 1971
Elmo is entered in a dog show. Houndman targets Mrs. Alstair's dog Cromwell, yet his henchmen mistake Elmo for Cromwell since the two dogs look alike.
16	"Mudsy and Muddlemore Manor"	December 25, 1971
Mudsy, Skip, Augie, and April arrive at Muddlemore Manor, which was a showplace for George Washington and his Continental Army. They find the place haunted by a ghost claiming to be the Spirit of '76. Meanwhile, Mayor Henry Iverson, a descendant of Mudsy's arch-nemesis, plans to have Muddlemore Manor torn down.
17	"Ghost Grabbers"	January 1, 1972
Arriving in East Muddlemore, Skip, Augie, and April learn more of Mudsy's past where he and Boo hid inside the longcase "grandfather" clock inside which both were eventually trapped and died upon stumbling onto the two renegade Redcoats who were burying their loot on the grounds. The group decides to look for the lost treasure when the hotel clerk Mr. Richford and the criminal Slippery Stark plan to capture Mudsy, hoping that he will lead them to the lost treasure, by disguising themselves as the ghosts of the two renegade Redcoats.

== Home media ==
On October 26, 2010, Warner Archive released The Funky Phantom: The Complete Series on DVD in region 1 as part of their Hanna-Barbera Classic Collection. This is a Manufacture-on-Demand (MOD) release, available exclusively through Warner's online store and Amazon.com. The series is also available in Digital media format at iTunes Store for Apple.

== Comics ==
In the 1970s, comic books of The Funky Phantom were released by Western Publishing and Gold Key Comics. The comics were both original stories as well as adaptations of some of the TV episodes. The stories in the comics, however, took a different turn from the TV episodes. While on the show, the "ghost" was always a villain in a mask (like Scooby-Doo), in some of the original comic stories, the villains would often turn out to be other ghosts from in or around the colonial era (the show never addressed why it seemed that there were no other ghosts besides Mudsy and Boo). The comics even did a twist on the series when the gang traveled back to colonial times via an erratic time machine, only to find out that the kids are now the ghosts (the machine could only transport spiritual matter) and Mudsy is once more inside his original flesh-and-blood body. Also, the comics introduced a new regular character who never appeared in the show and made a few appearances in some of the comic books. Priscilla Atwater was a ghostly matron from Mudsy's time, who lusted after Mudsy and pursued him actively, although she tended to flirt with just about any other ghost who happened to come along.

In 2018, the Phantom appeared in a backup story in the DC comic Black Lightning/Hong Kong Phooey Special #1; in this story, Jason Blood conjures Muddlemore's ghost so that some reporters and citizens can ask Mudsy what he thinks about the Second Amendment.

== Other appearances ==
- Mudsy appeared with Boo in the Harvey Birdman, Attorney at Law episode "High Speed Buggy Chase", where he was voiced by Chris Edgerly. The question "What makes the Funky Phantom so funky?" is finally asked and answered.
- Mudsy and his friends appear in the Scooby-Doo! Mystery Incorporated episode "Mystery Solvers Club State Finals" with Mudsy voiced by Tom Kenny and Boo voiced by Rick D. Wasserman. He and his team appear alongside other Hanna-Barbera mystery teams (consisting of Mystery Inc., Jabberjaw, Speed Buggy, and Captain Caveman and the Teen Angels) in a fever dream of Scooby-Doo's. When the teenage sleuths are kidnapped by a flaming skeletal spirit called Lord Infernicus (also voiced by Rick D. Wasserman), the sidekicks are left to solve the mystery. Mudsy believes Scooby cannot solve the case. It is revealed that Mudsy is the true culprit and not a real ghost, but a British down-on-his-luck actor who joined a team of teen sleuths who mistook him for a real ghost. Tired of being reduced to sidekick status, he kidnapped the teenage sleuths so he could become the hero instead of a sidekick and send the kids to Africa, which was in desperate need of teen mystery solvers in his eyes. Boo then states "You lied to me" in a deep voice and attacks Mudsy as retaliation. When Scooby wakes up, he finds that the State Finals have been moved to next week with the chairman that arrived having a strange resemblance to Mudsy. Of course, since this was just a dream and the fact that this is Scooby-Doo! Mystery Incorporated, this is not canon to the actual Funky Phantom show, let alone any other Hanna-Barbera series.
- Mudsy appeared in the MAD segment "ParaMorgan", where he was shown with other popular fictional ghosts.
- The second episode of Scooby-Doo and Guess Who? titled "A Mystery Solving Gang Divided" is a crossover with this series, with Mudsy once again voiced by Kenny who also voices Augie, now joined by Billy West as Skip and Kate Micucci as April. The group meets Mystery Inc. when it comes to a mystery involving the ghost of a Civil War sergeant. In order to get both groups to work together, Mudsy poses as the Ghost of Abraham Lincoln (voiced by John DiMaggio). A running gag in this episode is that Velma keeps asking Skip, Augie, and April what holographic technology they are using to pull off Mudsy's appearance.
- Mudsy and Boo both appear in the HBO Max original series Jellystone! with Mudsy voiced by Paul F. Tompkins. Mudsy's voice in Jellystone! is more unique sounding so that he would not sound similar to Bert Lahr. He is portrayed as an ex-world famous wrestler, forced to retire after using his ghostly powers against his opponents like he did when he possessed his opponent Mightor, now working as the spokesman for an avocado arrangement business. Mayor Huckleberry Hound arranged a wrestling event commentated by Snagglepuss and Mildew Wolf where the citizens in their wrestling name went up against each other to determine who would face off against the Funky Phantom. This lasted until Yogi in his wrestler name of Dr. Pain remained. The Funky Phantom uses his ghostly abilities on Dr. Pain causing Mayor Huckleberry to recall what happened in the Funky Phantom's infamous match and join the fight as the "Avocadog". He rallied the defeated wrestlers to help defeat the Funky Phantom. While the Funky Phantom apologized to Mayor Huckleberry for his misuse of his ghostly abilities, police chief Touché Turtle prepared to arrest the Funky Phantom for misusing his ghostly abilities causing the Funky Phantom to possess him. In "Jailcation", the Funky Phantom was shown to be an inmate at Santo Relaxo.
