= Hennesey =

American military comedy-drama television series

- Jackie Cooper as Hennesey
- Genre: Comedy drama
- Created by: Don McGuire
- Starring: Jackie Cooper; Abby Dalton
- Country of origin: United States
- Original language: English
- No. of seasons: 3
- No. of episodes: 96

Production
- Executive producers: Jackie Cooper; E.W. Swackhamer
- Producer: Jackie Cooper
- Running time: 24–26 minutes
- Production companies: Hennesey Productions; Jackie Cooper Productions; Outlet Productions (in association with the CBS Television Network)

Original release
- Network: CBS
- Release: September 28, 1959 – September 17, 1962

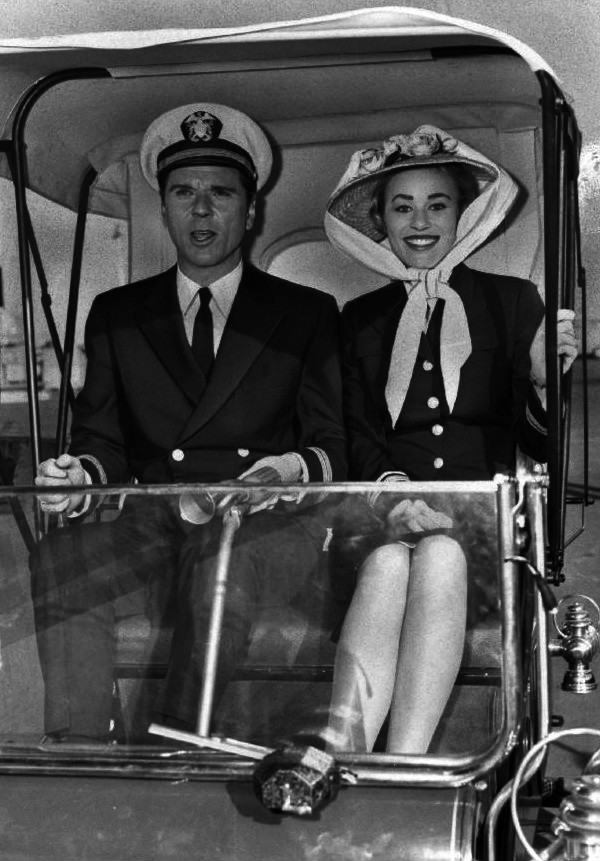
Jackie Cooper and Abby Dalton (1960)

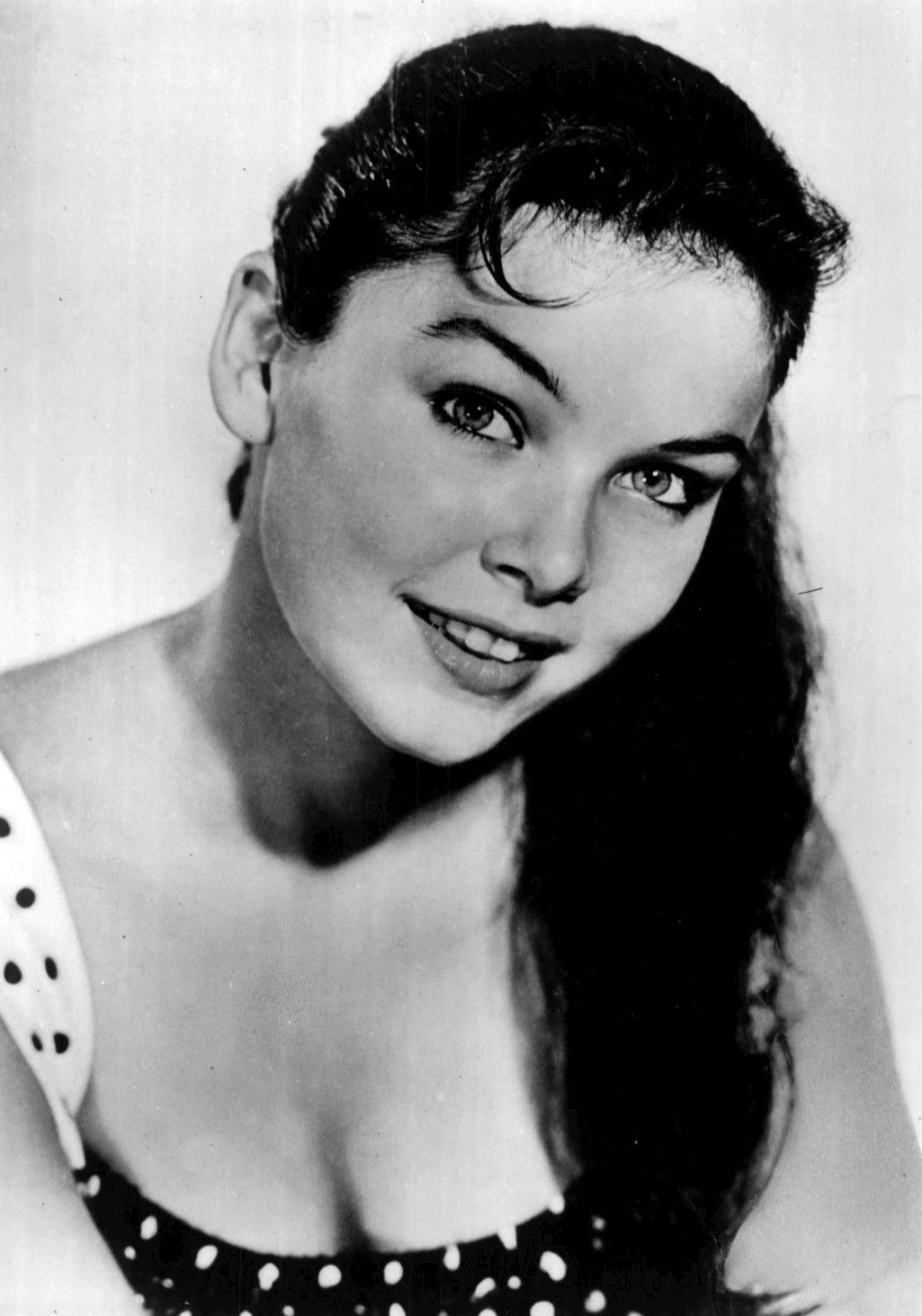
Guest star Yvonne Craig (1960)

Hennesey is an American military comedy-drama television series that aired on CBS from 1959 to 1962, starring Jackie Cooper and Abby Dalton.

Cooper played a United States Navy physician, Lt. Charles W. "Chick" Hennesey, with Abby Dalton as Navy nurse Lt. Martha Hale. In the story line, they are assigned to the hospital at the U.S. Naval Station in San Diego, California.

== Cast ==
=== Regulars ===
- Jackie Cooper as Lt. (later Lt. Commander) Charles "Chick" Hennesey, M.D.
- Abby Dalton as Lt. (JG) Martha Hale, R.N.
- Roscoe Karns as Capt. (later Rear Admiral) Walter Shafer
- Henry Kulky as Chief Petty Officer Max Bronski

=== Recurring cast (5 or more epsidoes) ===
- James Komack as Harvey Spencer Blair, III, D.D.S. (16 episodes)
- Herb Ellis as Dr. Dan Wagner (10 episodes)
- Arte Johnson as Seaman Seymour Shatz (5 episodes)
- Frank Gorshin (3 episodes), succeeded by Norman Alden (7 episodes) as Seaman Herman Pulaski

== Episodes ==
=== Season 1: 1959–60 ===
No. overall	No. in season	Title	Directed by	Written by	Original release date
1	1	"Hennessey"	Hy Averback	Don McGuire	September 28, 1959
Series pilot.
2	2	"Hennesey Meets Honeyboy Jones"	Unknown	Don McGuire	October 5, 1959
3	3	"Hennesey Meets Harvey Spencer Blair III"	Unknown	Don McGuire	October 12, 1959
4	4	"Hennesey and Peyton Place"	Unknown	Don McGuire	October 19, 1959
5	5	"Shore Patrol"	Don McGuire	Don McGuire	October 26, 1959
6	6	"Pork Chops and Apple Sauce"	Gene Reynolds	Hugh King	November 2, 1959
7	7	"The Baby Sitter"	Robert Butler	Don McGuire	November 16, 1959
8	8	"Hennesey Meets Mrs. Horatio Grief"	Unknown	Don McGuire	November 23, 1959
9	9	"Hennesey Goes Home"	Unknown	Don McGuire	November 30, 1959
10	10	"Hennesey and the Lady Doctor"	Robert Butler	Don McGuire	December 7, 1959
11	11	"Harvey Blair Returns"	Gene Reynolds	Don McGuire	December 14, 1959
12	12	"The Christmas Show"	Unknown	Don McGuire	December 21, 1959
13	13	"The Matchmaker"	Unknown	Don McGuire	December 28, 1959
14	14	"More of Harvey Spencer Blair"	Unknown	Don McGuire	January 4, 1960
15	15	"Space Man"	Unknown	Richard Baer	January 11, 1960
16	16	"Hennesey Joins the Marines"	Gene Reynolds	Don McGuire	January 18, 1960
17	17	"Hennesey Meets Fuji"	Robert Butler	Hugh King	January 25, 1960
18	18	"Hello, Cobra Leader"	Don McGuire	Don McGuire	February 1, 1960
19	19	"Hennesey and the Ancient Vehicle"	Unknown	Don McGuire	February 8, 1960
20	20	"Dr. Blair Again"	Unknown	Don McGuire	February 15, 1960
21	21	"The Annapolis Man"	Unknown	Arthur Julian	February 22, 1960
22	22	"Hennesey Meets Mr. Wilkins"	Unknown	Don McGuire	February 29, 1960
23	23	"Senior Nurse"	Unknown	Richard Baer	March 14, 1960
24	24	"Scarlet Woman in White"	Unknown	Richard Baer	March 21, 1960
25	25	"Angel Face"	Unknown	Richard Baer	March 28, 1960
26	26	"What Is Dr. Blair?"	Unknown	Don McGuire	April 4, 1960
27	27	"We're Glad It's You"	Unknown	Richard Baer	April 11, 1960
28	28	"Calling Dr. King"	Unknown	Richard Baer	April 18, 1960
29	29	"Which One Is Wagner?"	Unknown	Richard Baer	April 25, 1960
30	30	"Big Brother"	Unknown	Richard Baer	May 2, 1960
31	31	"Bonjour, Mr. Hennesey"	Unknown	Don McGuire	May 9, 1960
32	32	"Goodbye, Dr. Blair"	Unknown	Don McGuire	May 16, 1960

=== Season 2: 1960–61 ===
No. overall	No. in season	Title	Directed by	Written by	Original release date
33	1	"Hail to the Chief"	Don McGuire	Richard Baer (t)	October 3, 1960
34	2	"Tell It to the Chaplain"	Don McGuire	Richard Baer	October 10, 1960
35	3	"Hennesey à la Gunn"	Don McGuire	Don McGuire	October 17, 1960
36	4	"The Marriage of Dr. Blair"	Unknown	Don McGuire	October 24, 1960
37	5	"The Captain's Dilemma"	Unknown	Richard Baer	October 31, 1960
38	6	"Miss San Diego Navy"	Unknown	Don McGuire	November 14, 1960
39	7	"Hennesey and the Submarine"	Unknown	Don McGuire	November 21, 1960
40	8	"Come Home, Dr. Rogers"	Unknown	Don McGuire	November 28, 1960
41	9	"Harvey's Horse"	Unknown	Don McGuire	December 5, 1960
42	10	"The Underfed Fullback"	Unknown	Richard Baer	December 12, 1960
43	11	"The Reunion"	Unknown	Richard Baer	December 26, 1960
44	12	"The Hat"	Unknown	Richard Baer	January 2, 1961
45	13	"The Stutterer"	Unknown	Richard Baer	January 9, 1961
46	14	"The Promotion"	Unknown	Richard Baer	January 16, 1961
47	15	"The Specialist"	Unknown	Richard Baer	January 23, 1961
48	16	"Harvey Spencer Blair and His Electric Money Machine"	Don McGuire	Don McGuire	January 31, 1961
49	17	"Hennesey vs. Crandall"	Unknown	Richard Baer	February 6, 1961
50	18	"Join the Navy, Please"	Unknown	Richard Baer	February 13, 1961
51	19	"The Apartment"	Unknown	Don McGuire	February 20, 1961
52	20	"Max Remembers Papa"	Unknown	Richard Baer	February 27, 1961
53	21	"The Novelist"	Unknown	Don McGuire	March 6, 1961
54	22	"Harvey's Doll"	Unknown	James Komack	March 13, 1961
55	23	"The Wedding"	Unknown	Don McGuire	March 27, 1961
56	24	"The Green-Eyed Monster"	James Komack	Richard Baer	April 3, 1961
57	25	"Admiral and Son"	Unknown	Richard Baer	April 10, 1961
58	26	"The Nogoodnik"	Unknown	Richard Baer	April 17, 1961
59	27	"Harvey's Pad"	Unknown	Richard Baer	April 24, 1961
60	28	"The Patient Vanishes"	Unknown	Richard Baer	May 1, 1961
61	29	"Shore Patrol Revisited"	Unknown	Don McGuire	May 8, 1961
62	30	"A Star Is Born"	Unknown	Don McGuire	May 15, 1961
63	31	"His Honor, Dr. Blair"	Don McGuire	Don McGuire	May 22, 1961
64	32	"The Signover"	Unknown	Don McGuire	June 5, 1961

=== Season 3: 1961–62 ===
No. overall	No. in season	Title	Directed by	Written by	Original release date
65	1	"The Gossip-Go-Round"	Jackie Cooper	Richard Baer, James Komack	September 25, 1961
66	2	"The Holdout"	Jackie Cooper	Richard Baer	October 2, 1961
67	3	"Welcome Home, Dr. Blair"	Jackie Cooper	James Komack	October 9, 1961
68	4	"The Cohen Mutiny"	Unknown	Don McGuire	October 16, 1961
69	5	"My Daughter, the Nurse"	Unknown	Richard Baer	October 23, 1961
70	6	"Aunt Sarah"	Unknown	Richard Baer	October 30, 1961
71	7	"Get Me Clyde Dingle"	Unknown	Don McGuire	November 13, 1961
72	8	"Professional Sailor"	Jackie Cooper	Richard Baer	November 20, 1961
73	9	"Aloha, Dr. Hennesey"	Unknown	Richard Baer	November 27, 1961
74	10	"Remember Pearl Harbor?"	Jackie Cooper	Richard Baer	December 4, 1961
75	11	"The Sightseers"	Unknown	Richard Baer	December 11, 1961
76	12	"Going Home"	Unknown	Richard Baer	December 18, 1961
77	13	"Santa Hits Harvey"	Unknown	Richard Baer	December 25, 1961
78	14	"The Man in the Crow's Nest"	Unknown	Richard Baer	January 1, 1962
79	15	"Hysteresis Synchronous Can Be Fun"	Jackie Cooper	Don McGuire	January 8, 1962
80	16	"Harvey and the Ring"	Unknown	Richard Baer	January 15, 1962
81	17	"Little Girl"	Unknown	James Komack	January 22, 1962
82	18	"Tight Quarters"	Unknown	James Komack	January 29, 1962
83	19	"Close Enough for Jazz"	Unknown	James Komack	February 5, 1962
84	20	"Patti's Tune"	Unknown	Unknown	February 12, 1962
85	21	"The Hobby"	Unknown	Don McGuire	February 19, 1962
86	22	"Harvey's Pills"	Unknown	James Komack	February 26, 1962
87	23	"The Bicep Caper"	Unknown	Don McGuire	March 5, 1962
88	24	"The Old Pro"	Unknown	Dee Mordacai	March 12, 1962
89	25	"Big Bertha"	Unknown	Richard Baer	March 19, 1962
90	26	"Buttons and Bones"	Unknown	James Komack	March 26, 1962
91	27	"No Down Payment"	Unknown	Don McGuire	April 2, 1962
92	28	"The Best Man"	Unknown	James Komack	April 9, 1962
93	29	"Calling Doctor Good-Deed"	Unknown	Don McGuire	April 13, 1962
94	30	"Hennesey Meets Soupy Sales"	Jackie Cooper	James Komack	April 23, 1962
95	31	"Martha"	Unknown	E.W. Swackhamer	April 30, 1962
96	32	"I Thee Wed"	Unknown	Richard Baer	May 7, 1962

== Guest stars ==
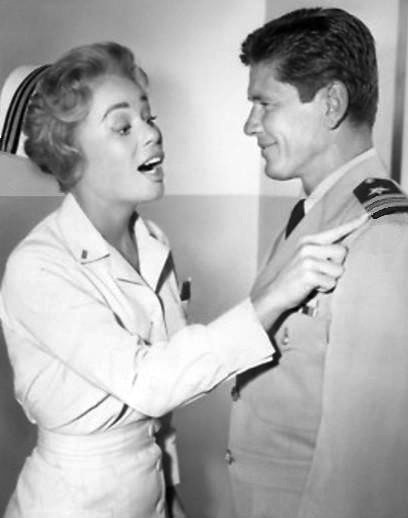
Abby Dalton with guest star Charles Bronson

Actor and singer Bobby Darin was cast in the second episode (October 5, 1959) as "Honeyboy Jones". That same week Darin became famous with his version of the song, "Mack the Knife".

Prior to being cast as Opie Taylor on The Andy Griffith Show, child actor Ron Howard played "Walker", a little boy temporarily left in Hennesey's care in the 1959 episode "The Baby Sitter". Gary Hunley, another child actor, appeared in the same episode.

Charles Bronson, en route to a long film career, was cast twice as Lt. Cmdr. Steve Ogrodowski, a Navy intelligence officer.

Don Rickles was cast in the 1961 episode "Professional Sailor" as CPO Ernie Schmidt. From 1976 to 1978, Rickles played the lead with the same rank in the NBC military sitcom, C.P.O. Sharkey.

Bandleader Les Brown and His Band of Renown and comedian Soupy Sales appeared in separate episodes as themselves.

Other guest stars:

- Raymond Bailey
- Roy Barcroft
- Gertrude Berg
- Ken Berry
- Bill Bixby
- Jolene Brand
- Charles Bronson
- Jean Byron
- Jack Carter
- Jack Cassidy
- Phyllis Coates
- Ellen Corby
- Yvonne Craig
- Robert Culp
- Sammy Davis Jr.
- Donna Douglas
- James Franciscus
- Robert Foulk
- Bob Hastings
- Hoke Howell
- Marty Ingels
- Vivi Janiss
- Arch Johnson
- Helen Kleeb
- Ruta Lee
- Jimmy Lydon
- Doug McClure
- Jaye P. Morgan
- Ed Nelson
- J. Pat O'Malley
- Sue Randall
- Stafford Repp
- Chris Robinson
- Mickey Rooney
- Walter Sande
- William Schallert
- Johnny Seven
- Olan Soule
- Larry Storch
- Dick Wessel
- Grace Lee Whitney
- Meg Wyllie

== Production notes ==
The series theme tune by Sonny Burke was a jazzy hornpipe played by tuba and piccolo. Hennesey was also innovative for being the first series to employ what has since become a standard device in television: beginning the dialog and action of each episode during opening credits.

Cooper starred in, produced, and directed the series, drawing upon his real-life experience as a World War II Navy veteran and his continuing service for many years as an officer in the United States Naval Reserve. He was a former child actor who starred in the Our Gang comedies of the early 1930s and then moved into feature films.

Beginning in 1960, scriptwriter Richard Baer wrote 38 of Hennesey's episodes, which earned him an Emmy nomination.

For the series finale, "I, Thee Wed", broadcast on May 7, 1962, characters Chick and Martha were married following their series-long romance.
