= Dr. Know (band) =

American punk band

- Origin: Oxnard, California
- Genres: Nardcore, crossover thrash, punk rock
- Years active: 1981–1991, 1998–2010, 2012–present
- Labels: Mystic (1981–1986); Death (1986–1988); Unrest (2008–present)
- Members: Brandon Cruz; Fred Mattaquin; Larry White; Adam Fuscaldo; Angelo Miles Sr
- Past members: Joey Pena; Ismael Hernandez; Robin Cartwright; Marc Fischer; Kyle Toucher; Steve Contreras; Rick Contreras; Rik Heller; Ron Baird; Dave Cassilas; Tony Black; Mike Vallejo; Jody Hill; Nick Townsend; Liberty Allen; Eric Larzelere; Eric Vasquez; Craig Cano; Larz White; David Smash; Gizz Lazlo; Mike Purdy; Mike Vega; Tim Harkins; Steve Morrison; Bill Bensen

Dr. Know is an American punk band, which began as a Nardcore band from Oxnard, California. They are regarded as founding fathers of the so-called "Nardcore" punk movement which originated in and around Oxnard, California.

== History ==
The band was started by Kyle Toucher, Ismael Hernandez, and Robin Cartwright in early 1981, and after auditioning a few singers, local Silver Strand Beach surfer/skater Brandon Cruz got the job. Silver Strand Beach in Oxnard, California was the birthplace of Nardcore. The band recorded studio versions of several early songs with Cruz, however the early momentum was somewhat derailed by inner turmoil and it led to him leaving the group in 1983, leaving Toucher to take over vocals just as the band was starting recording of Plug in Jesus for Mystic Records. Several more albums followed, including the Burn EP, This Island Earth, and Wreckage in Flesh, which were subsequently released on Death Records/Metal Blade, signaling a shift to a crossover direction in their sound. For This Island Earth, the lineup was founding member Kyle Toucher on vocals and guitars, drummer Rik Heller and bassist Ismael Hernandez. Before an American tour for This Island Earth with Scottish street punks The Exploited, Ismael Hernandez quit the band and was replaced by ex-Stäläg 13 members, bassist Tony Black and second guitarist Tim Harkins.

After another short U.S. tour and attempt at writing a new album, Rick Heller quit the band before moving to Scotland, where he joined The Exploited and drummer Larry White was brought in to finish writing and begin recording of what would become Wreckage in Flesh. During this period Tony Black was replaced by Mike Purdy and the album was finished April 1988. Two subsequent tours followed in support of the album with bands such as Circle Jerks, D.R.I., Murphy's Law, 7 Seconds as well as shows with up and coming thrash metal bands Forbidden, Vio-lence, Holy Terror, and Metal Church.

Dr. Know disbanded to pursue other projects in 1991. Slayer covered the Toucher penned "Mr. Freeze" on their 1996 Undisputed Attitude album. The Dr. Know song "Piece of Meat," written by Toucher and Cruz, is used on the 1998 (season two) South Park episode entitled "Clubhouse".

In 1998, Cruz called Hernandez and together they approached Toucher. Toucher declined, but Hernandez and Cruz recruited others and embarked on a North American tour with big-name punk acts of the time. In September 2001, Cruz was asked to sing with old friends, the reunited Dead Kennedys, leading to a gig that lasted until April 2003. Dr. Know still managed another record, entitled Father, Son, and Holy Shit! and toured the West Coast with Stäläg 13 and Ill Repute. Dr. Know released their last record in 2009, on Unrest Records, entitled "Killing For God." Cruz, Hernandez, and the Contreras cousins, Rick and Steve, all wrote the record, recorded in Santa Cruz, California.

Dr. Know with Hernandez and Cruz played a couple of sort of final gigs, in Santa Cruz, Ca., and in Oakland, November 25 and 26, 2011. On November 27, 2011, Brandon Cruz posted the official end of his and Hernandez' version of Dr Know, but on the same day Kyle Toucher announced the reformation of the Wreckage in Flesh era line up. Called The Real Dr. Know featuring Kyle Toucher, the lineup is Toucher, Mike Purdy, Tim Harkins, and Steve "El Steevo" Morrison. As of late 2011, the Toucher-led Dr. Know has reformed and have played a few successful West Coast gigs. The two lineups went back and forth and each played when the other didn't. Overall, there is a split among Toucher or Cruz fans, depending on those who like metal or punk.

After Toucher complained and attempted to copyright material that he didn't draw, the very distinct Dr. Know girl, drawn by Jaime Hernandez, the attempt failed. The Cruz and Hernandez version of the band gave birth to KNOW, in November 2016. Known as KNOW, ex-members of the band playing the punk music of Dr. Know, began rehearsing with Cruz, Hernandez, Larry White, ex drummer from the metal era, and Fred Mattaquin, the 2nd guitarist on the Burn ep. KNOW went to Europe with Stäläg 13 to begin the Nardcore Summer Tour on July 22, 2017. It started off with a festival in Copenhagen with Discharge and ended at the Rebellion Festival in Blackpool, England, and was a great success.

KNOW changed back to Dr. Know after Toucher reportedly lost interest in doing his metal version occasionally. An appearance at Punk Rock Bowling happened September 24, and 26th in Las Vegas in 2022. Then a tour with the duo The Garden of the East Coat and Southwest happened in November. Dr. Know replaced original bassist Hernandez after legal troubles and added Adam Fuscalo, a local friend and tattoo artist, and as of May 2023, have added second guitarist Angelo Miles, a Pt. Hueneme resident and tattooist, also the lead guitarist of Boilerman. A new album is in the works with Mattequin and Miles writing most of the music, while Cruz will add a few riffs and all lyrics.

== The Danish Connection ==
In 2018 - the band got some gigs in UK and Denmark. Unfortunately it was not economically viable to fly everybody in from Oxnard. Since Brandon was in Denmark at the time, he gathered some friends and got them to perform as Dr. Know. The band members came from CopWeaps, Pleasure Squad, President Fetch & The Natural Disasters.

They played in Leeds, Rebellion (Blackpool) and Copehagen. It was a great success.

== Discography ==
- We Got Power, Party or Go Home - Compilation LP (Mystic,1983)
- It Came From Slimy Valley, Compilation LP (Mystic, 1983)
- Party Animal, We Got Power II - Compilation LP (Mystic,1984)
- Covers, Compilation LP (Mystic,1984)
- Mystic Super Seven Sampler No. 1, Compilation LP (Mystic,1984)
- Mystic Sampler No. 1, Compilation LP (Mystic)
- Mystic Sampler No. 2, Compilation LP (Mystic)
- Mystic Sampler No. 3, Compilation LP (Mystic)
- Nardcore, Compilation LP (Mystic, 1984)
- Return to Slimy Valley, Compilation LP (Mystic)
- Plug-in Jesus, 12-inch LP (Mystic, 1984)
- Burn, 7-inch EP (Mystic, 1985)
- This Island Earth, 12-inch LP (Death Records, 1986)
- The Original Group, 12-inch LP (Mystic, 1987) This was actually the first recording, done with Brandon Cruz in 1981.
- Wreckage in Flesh, 12-inch LP (Death Records, 1988)
- This Island Earth/Wreckage in Flesh, CD (Death Records, 1990)
- Father, Son, and Holy Shit, LP ( recorded in 2000)
- Habily: What Was Old Is New, CD (Cleopatra, 2001)
- Fish & Vegetables, Compilation CD (Hello Records, 2001)
- Best of Dr. Know, CD (Mystic, 2003)
- Welcome to the Neighborhood, Compilation CD (Let Them Eat Records, 2005)
- Killing For God, CD /Vinyl LP (Unrest, 2008)
