= Kristina Holland =

American actress (1944–2023)

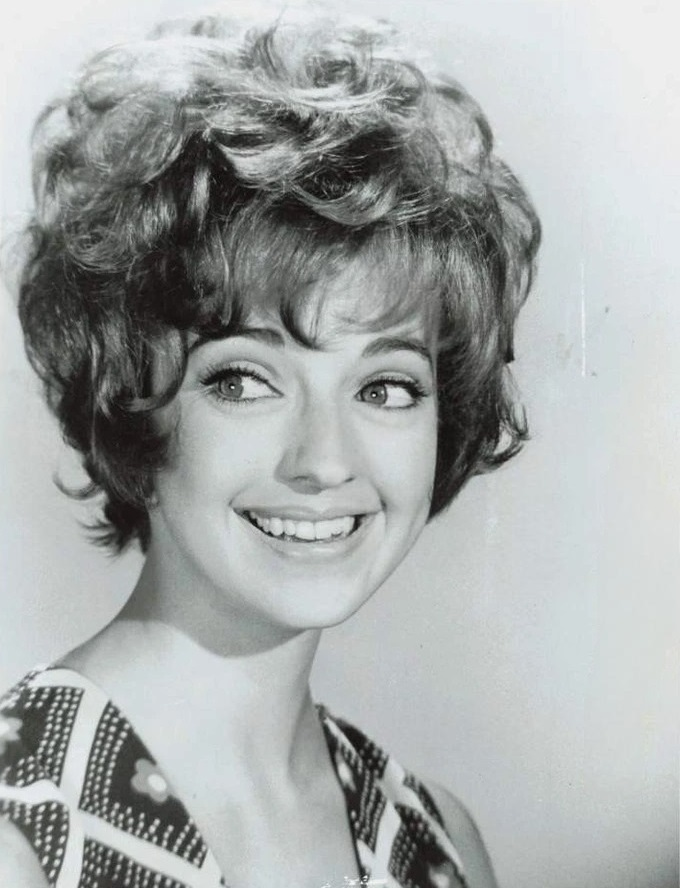
- Holland in 1970
- Born: February 25, 1944; Fayetteville, North Carolina, U.S.
- Died: February 22, 2023 (aged 78)
- Education: Pacifica Graduate Institute
- Occupation: Actress
- Spouse: Ron Poindexter

Kristina Holland (February 25, 1944 – February 22, 2023), born Kristina Jane Hermanson, (other sources spell her last name Hermansen) was an American actress who performed in more than 22 television series, two films, and voiceover talent for at least two video games. She later worked as a professional psychotherapist.

Holland was perhaps best known for her recurring role as Tina Rickles, secretary to Tom Corbett (Bill Bixby) in the television series The Courtship of Eddie's Father. She was the voice of April Stewart in the animated series The Funky Phantom, the voice of Stephanie in the animated series Butch Cassidy and the Sundance Kids and the voice of Alice Boyle in the animated series Wait Till Your Father Gets Home.

== Life and career ==
Holland was born in Fayetteville, North Carolina, on February 25, 1944. She attended Woodside High School and received the Outstanding Student Award her senior year. Her birth surname is Danish. Because she thought Hermansen was too difficult to spell she picked Holland for her professional surname. She initially desired to be a ballerina, but a problem with her knee caused her to abandon that goal.

She graduated from Pacifica Graduate Institute in 2002 and was a practicing psychologist from 2000.

Holland was married to choreographer Ron Poindexter.

Holland died on February 22, 2023, aged 78.
