= Silver Strand Beach =

Beach neighborhood in California, United States

Coordinates: 34°9′12″N 119°13′12″W

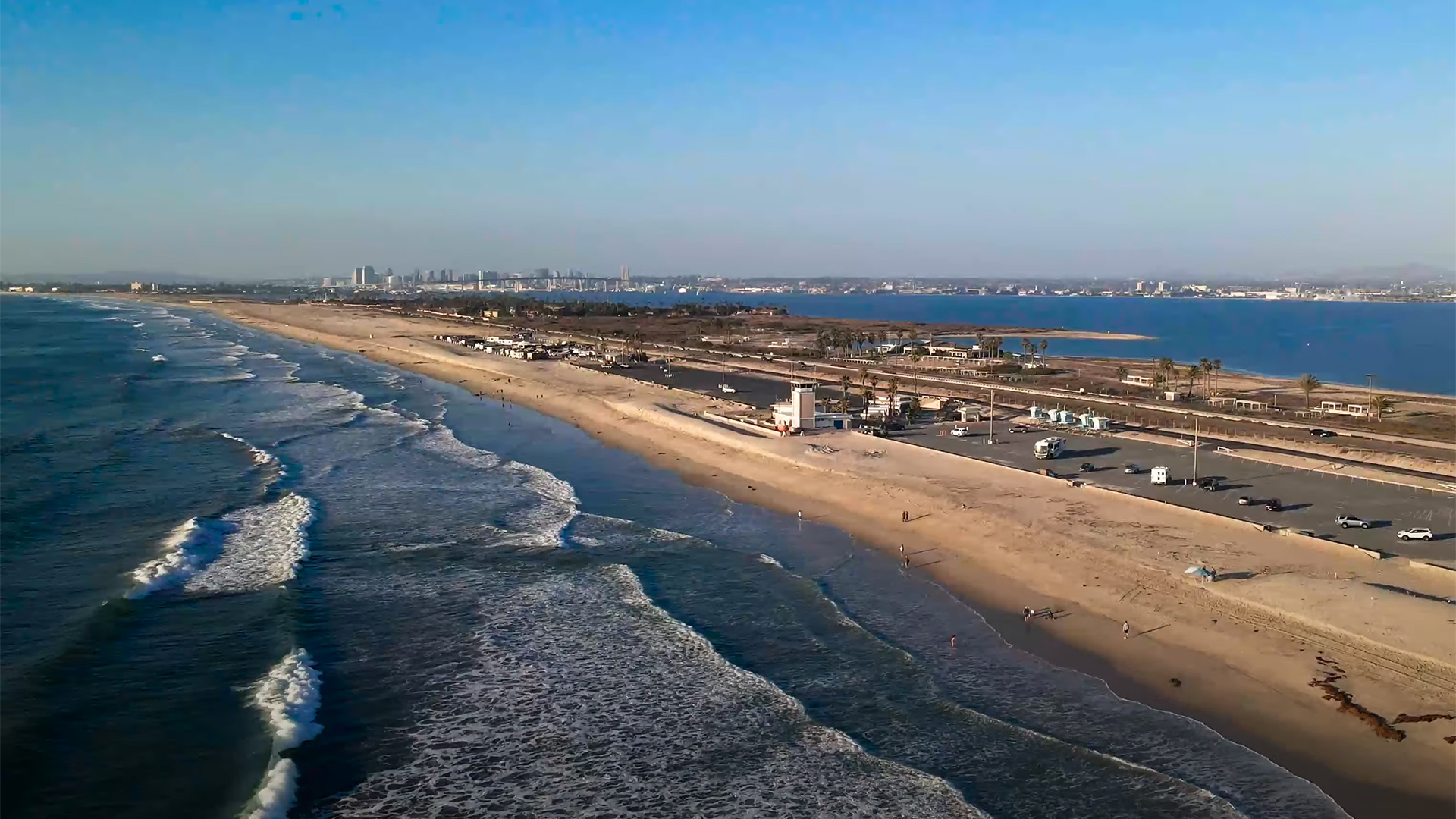
SIlver Strand State Beach San Diego, California

Map of Silver Strand Beach (area inside the red lines)

Silver Strand Beach is an unincorporated beach neighborhood in Ventura County, California, United States. Lying between the mouth of Channel Islands Harbor on the north and the ocean entrance to the Port of Hueneme on the south, the eastern side of the beach community lies along the boundary of the Naval Construction Battalion Center Port Hueneme. The harbors and the Naval base almost completely surround Silver Strand, keeping the area relatively separate from the city of Oxnard and making it accessible by only one main road, Victoria Avenue.

For statistical purposes, the United States Census Bureau has combined Silver Strand with two other historic neighborhoods, Hollywood Beach and Hollywood by the Sea, to define a census-designated place (CDP) named Channel Islands Beach.

Because of its location near an open water trench, it is common to see a large array of marine life including dolphins, seals, and jellyfish. Silver Strand is also home to the Oxnard Base of the United States Coast Guard.

== Description ==
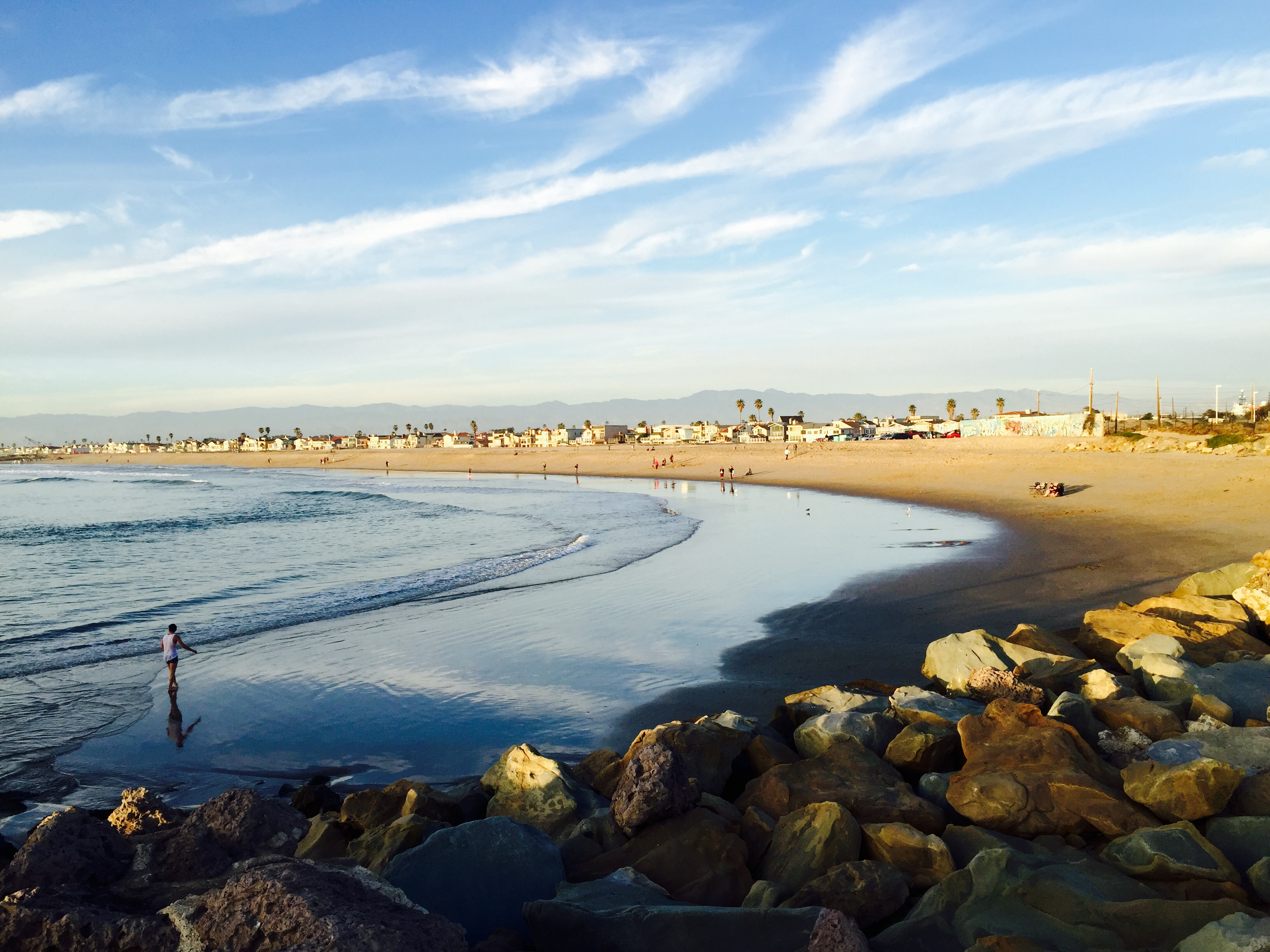
Silver Strand Beach, January 2015

Silver Strand, commonly referred to as "The Strand" or "Strand", is a collection of mostly post-WW II single-family homes, some multi-family homes, and some newer homes directly on the beach. There are two small zoned commercial districts. The main commercial district is centered around Roosevelt Boulevard and consists of a collection of small restaurants, a yoga studio, and a few real estate offices and other small businesses. The second commercial zone is located at the southern end of the beach and features a local beer and wine establishment.

Channel Islands Beach Community Services District provides local control over utilities services for Silver Strand and the unincorporated beach-front communities to the north that were separated by the construction of the ocean entrance to Channel Islands Harbor. The Population is 3,315. Median Household income is $71,850 with a per capita income $42,974. Median age is 39. The population is 89% White Non-Hispanic.

=== Name ===
Silver Strand is known by numerous different names and spelling. When the name was created as part of the Hollywood Beach subdivision in 1924 it was spelled as one word Silverstrand. However, in the Ventura county coastal zoning ordinance the area is referred to with two words Silver Strand.

== History ==
The Silver Strand Beach community dates back to 1924 when the Hollywood Beach subdivision was initiated in unincorporated Ventura County. Silver Strand was mapped in 1925, and Hollywood by the Sea in 1926. Hollywood by the Sea is located adjacent to Silver Strand on the east side of Victoria Avenue / Roosevelt Boulevard. The harbor, which was constructed in the 1960s, is located where much of Hollywood by the Sea once stood. The original Hueneme lighthouse, constructed in 1874, was adjacent to the south end of the neighborhood but the establishment of the Naval Construction Battalion Center blocked direct access to Hueneme on the other side of the port and took over the south five blocks of the Silver Strand.

=== Shipwreck ===
In 1970, the declining luxury cruise liner La Jenelle, formerly known as the SS Arosa Star, had been anchored off Silverstrand awaiting investments for reconditioning. On April 13 strong winds pushed the ship near the entrance of the Port of Hueneme. With only two crewmen aboard, they were unable to keep the wind and high waves from pushing the boat onto a sand bar near the beach where the ship capsized. Since the boat was well over 50 years old, it was abandoned by its owners and quickly started disintegrating in the surf. To prevent injury, the navy cut the exposed top off the boat and then filled hull and surrounding area with rocks and sand. This created a breakwater for the port as well as a popular fishing spot on the south end of the beach. Parts of the deck and hull are still visible from the south jetty and a full-length view of the ship can be seen from the ocean.

== Beach ==
Silver Strand Beach is a one-mile-long sandy beach (1.6 km) about 150-yard in width (140 m). It is capped by the north and south jetties which both have small parking lots and limited restroom facilities. In February 2014, construction started close to the parking lot near the north jetty to build a 2-story lifeguard tower with restrooms to replace the previous one that was there since 1967, but demolished in 2002 due to storm damage. The coast is a sandy bottom beach break which can sometimes feature rip tides and an undertow. Lifeguards are on duty every day during the summer and off duty from Sept to May.

The Mural Wall at The Ship parking lot, Silverstrand Beach.

== Localism ==
The area's isolated setting and blue-collar/Naval history contributes to a reputation for localism among Silver Strand's surfers. The Silver Strand Locals, often referred to as SSL, have been featured in the documentary The Swell Life.

== Music and entertainment ==
Silver Strand Beach is credited as being the birthplace of the Nardcore style of hardcore punk music. Oxnard was the epicenter of the early 1980s hardcore punk scene in Southern California, and many of its founding genre bands were from Silverstrand, most notable being Dr. Know, Stalag 13, Ill Repute, and Agression.

== See also ==
- List of beaches in California
