= The Courtship of Eddie's Father (TV series) =

American sitcom (1969–1972)

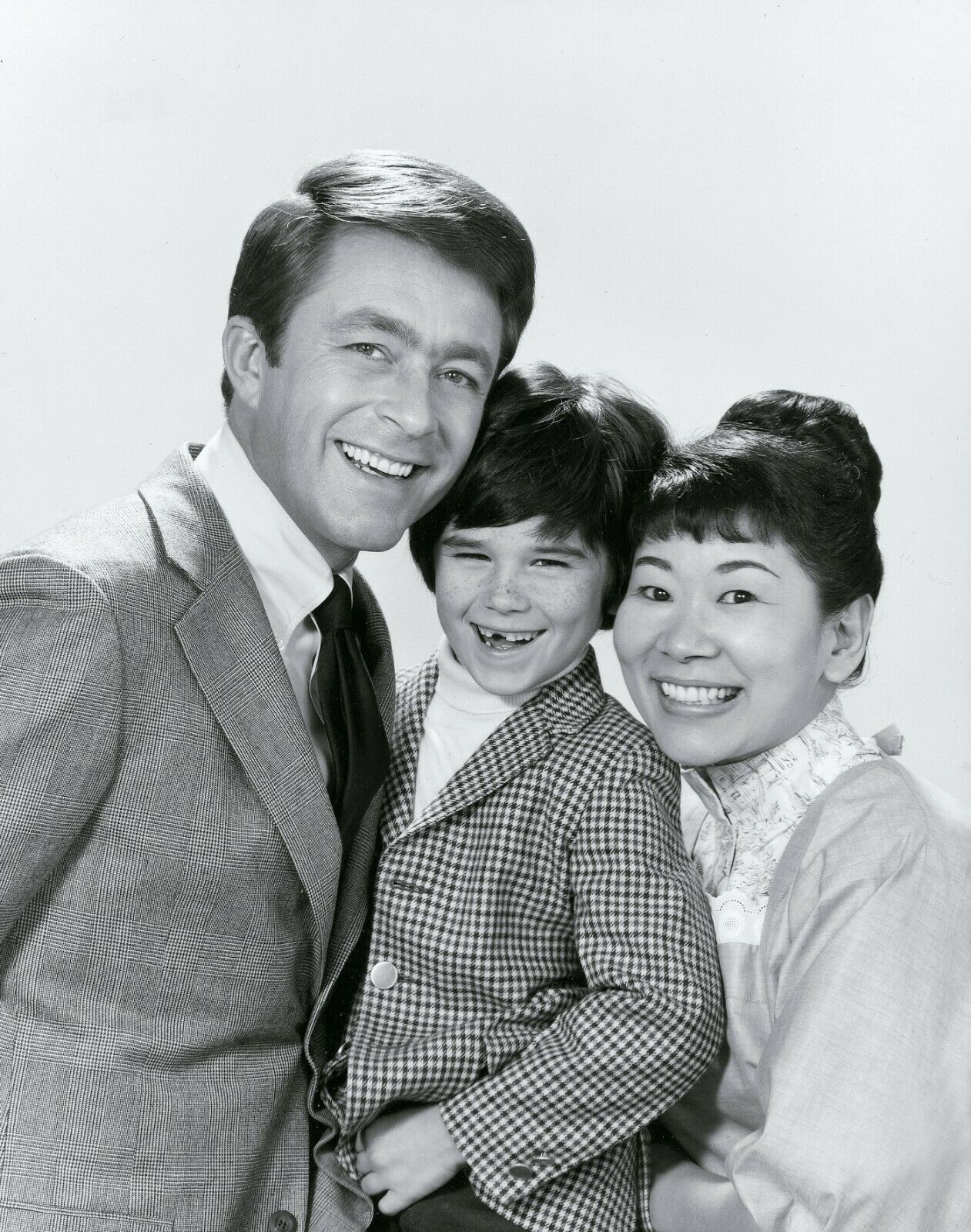
- From left: Bill Bixby, Brandon Cruz and Miyoshi Umeki, 1969
- Genre: Family sitcom
- Created by: James Komack
- Starring: Bill Bixby; Brandon Cruz; Miyoshi Umeki; James Komack; Kristina Holland
- Opening theme: "Best Friend" performed by Harry Nilsson
- Composer: George Tipton
- Country of origin: United States
- Original language: English
- No. of seasons: 3
- No. of episodes: 73 (list of episodes)

Production
- Running time: 26 minutes
- Production company: MGM Television

Original release
- Network: ABC
- Release: September 17, 1969 – March 1, 1972

The Courtship of Eddie's Father is an American sitcom based on the 1963 film of the same name, which was based on a novel by Mark Toby (edited by Dorothy Wilson).

The series is about a widower, Tom Corbett (played by Bill Bixby), who is a magazine publisher, and his young son Eddie (played by Brandon Cruz). Eddie believes his father should marry and manipulates situations surrounding the women his father is interested in. (Eddie's matchmaking efforts were the theme of the film but gradually became less central to the storylines in the series.)

The series debuted on September 17, 1969, and was last broadcast on March 1, 1972.

Bixby received an Emmy nomination for the show.

== Plot ==
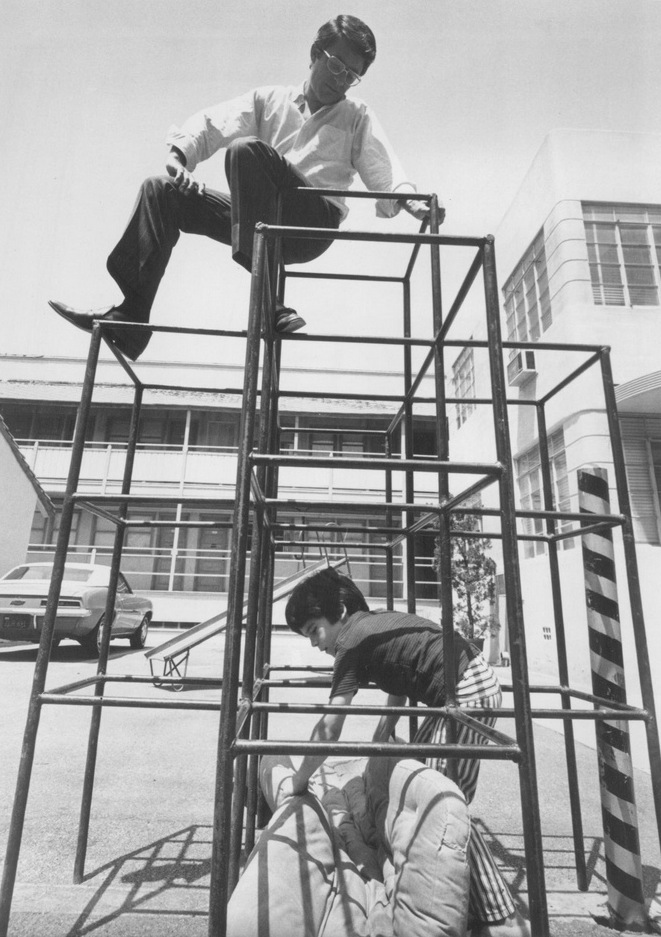
Bixby and Cruz as Tom and Eddie

The show centered on Tom Corbett (Bill Bixby), a handsome thirty-something magazine publisher and widower from Los Angeles. Following the death of his wife Helen, Tom is left to raise his mischievous, freckle-faced son, six-year-old Eddie (Brandon Cruz). Eddie wants a new mother, so to that end, he cleverly manipulates his father's relationships with women, sometimes even trying to set his father up to fall for women Eddie knows and likes first.

The father-son duo's domestic arrangements are managed, with great discretion, by their Japanese housekeeper, Mrs. Livingston (Miyoshi Umeki). Her sage advice adds to the comic mix in situations where she looks after Eddie and sometimes helps him further his schemes to marry off his father and find a new mother. Mrs. Livingston addresses her employer Tom as "Mr. Eddie's Father." Characters from Tom Corbett's office included Tina Rickles (Kristina Holland) as his secretary and Norman Tinker (James Komack) as the magazine's photographer and hip friend. Norman served as Eddie's honorary uncle.

== Cast ==
=== Main cast ===
Bill Bixby and Brandon Cruz are the only two actors to appear in every episode of the series.

- Bill Bixby as Tom Corbett – A widower and a magazine editor
- Brandon Cruz as Eddie Corbett – Tom's son
- Miyoshi Umeki as Mrs. Livingston – Tom's and Eddie's housekeeper
- Kristina Holland as Tina Rickles – Tom's secretary
- James Komack as Norman Tinker – Tom's partner at a magazine company

=== Guest cast ===
During its three-season run, many familiar actors guest-starred on the show, as did many up-and-coming actors who went on to become successful stars, including: Jodie Foster, Sally Struthers, Bruce Kirby, Pat Harrington Jr., Diana Muldaur, Willie Aames, Warren Berlinger, Suzanne Pleshette, Yvonne Craig, Cicely Tyson, Richard X. Slattery, Tippi Hedren, Trisha Noble, John Fiedler, Alan Oppenheimer, Lou Jacobi, Will Geer, Bill Dana, Jerry Stiller, Anne Meara, Ronny Graham, Lori Saunders, Ann Prentiss, Ron Ely, Carol Lawrence, and George Takei. Future Happy Days stars Pat Morita and Erin Moran also made guest appearances. Other established stars had cameo appearances, such as Eve McVeagh as a grumpy neighbor named Lorraine Karn, Sammy Davis Jr. as an insurance man, and Bixby's then wife Brenda Benet as Tom's girlfriend.

== Production ==
=== Filming ===
Actors Brandon Cruz and Bill Bixby developed a close rapport that translated to an off-camera friendship as well. According to Bixby, "The amazing thing is that when we're working in a scene together, there's never a thought of conscious acting. Our natural affection for one another is what appeals to the audience." After the show ended, Bixby and Cruz remained close, and in 1995, two years after Bixby's death, Cruz named his own son Lincoln Bixby Cruz.

Comedy producer James Komack served as the show's creator and executive producer. In 1970 Bill Bixby made his debut as a director, going on to direct eight of the show's episodes.

=== Theme song ===
The theme song, "Best Friend", was written and performed by Harry Nilsson; it was an adaptation of his song "Girlfriend" with new lyrics written for the show. The theme was played over opening credits showing Tom and Eddie in various happy moments. For the initial episodes of the series, Nilsson sang all the music cues himself, working with arranger George Tipton. As Alyn Shipton wrote in her biography of Nilsson, "Pinning down a busy musician to record dozens of cues that were often only a few seconds long proved difficult, and after nine episodes or so, Nilsson's interjections were gradually phased out, and Tipton handled the majority of the cues instrumentally, with studio singers sometimes dubbing in additional words."

An edited version of "Best Friend" was used as the theme song for the 2006 MTV series Rob & Big.

=== Cancellation ===
The show was cancelled in 1972, when Bixby and Komack had a falling out over the show's direction. Many of the later episodes focused on Norman, Tom, and Eddie rather than on the relationship between Tom and Eddie. Years after the show was cancelled, it became popular as reruns in syndication.

== Home media ==
Warner Bros. has released all three seasons of The Courtship of Eddie's Father on DVD in Region 1 via their Warner Archive Collection. These are Manufacture-on-Demand (MOD) releases, available via WBShop.com and Amazon.

DVD name	Ep #	Release date
The Complete First Season	26	September 27, 2011
The Complete Second Season	24	October 9, 2012
The Complete Third Season	23	January 14, 2014

== Failed re-makes ==
There have been three attempts at remaking the show, none of which resulted in a new series.

As early as 1999, Entertainment Weekly reported plans for Nicolas Cage to star in and produce a feature-film remake of the series. In a 2011 interview, Brandon Cruz believed Cage was likely no longer interested in the project because Cage's son Weston, who would have played Eddie, had grown too old for the part.

In 2003 filming began on a new television pilot which starred Ken Marino and Josh Hutcherson, but it was not picked up by a network. The child star of the previous series, Brandon Cruz, played a supporting role.

In 2014 Willie Garson was developing a version in which he would star as Norman Tinker. Garson was going to write and produce alongside feature filmmakers Mark Levin, Jennifer Flackett, and Conan O'Brien. The series never went into production.
