= James Komack =

American television producer, director, screenwriter, and actor (1924–1997)

- Born: August 3, 1924; New York City, U.S.
- Died: December 24, 1997 (aged 73); Los Angeles, California, U.S.
- Resting place: Forest Lawn Memorial Park
- Occupations: Television producer; Television director; Screenwriter; Actor
- Spouse: Marilyn Cluny Cohen (m. 1955)
- Children: 1

James Arenson Komack (August 3, 1924 – December 24, 1997) was an American television producer, director, screenwriter, and actor. He is best known for producing several hit television series, including The Courtship of Eddie's Father, Chico and the Man, and Welcome Back, Kotter.

Over the course of his career, Komack was nominated for two Golden Globe Awards and two Primetime Emmy Awards.

== Early life and family ==
James Komack was born in New York, the son of Max Komack (1894–1956) and Frances Greenstein Komack (1899–1986). He had one sister, Roslyn "Roz" Komack (later Baldassare, 1920–1992).

== Career ==
Komack performed in both the film and the original Broadway cast of the musical Damn Yankees. In both productions, he played the role of a baseball player performing the song "(You Gotta Have) Heart". Komack also appeared in Frank Capra's film A Hole in the Head as Julius Manetta, the inept son of Mario (Edward G. Robinson) and Sophie (Thelma Ritter).

Early in his career, Komack worked as a stand-up comedian and was cast in sixteen episodes over three seasons as United States Navy millionaire dentist Harvey Spencer Blair III, in the CBS military sitcom/drama, Hennesey, starring Jackie Cooper and Abby Dalton. The second season he began writing some of the scripts. From there he went on to directing, including episodes of the Dick Van Dyke Show, Gallant Men, Combat, 77 Sunset Strip, the Lloyd Bridges Show, and received an Emmy nomination for Dr. Kildare.

Komack's first hit of writing was topical night club material. In addition to writing for himself, he sold songs and patter to other performers, notably Eartha Kitt and Robert Clary. He recorded a gold hit record, "The Knickname Song". Komack made a record album of his comedy routine, James Komack at the Waldorf. He also recorded a music album on RCA Victor in 1957 titled Inside Me, under the orchestra direction of Dennis Farnon. In total, he made 8 albums and 14 singles, mostly comedy routines but also some songs.

Also in 1957, he guest starred as “Buck Pierce”, a helpful & kind cowboy who was part of the crew heading west on Wagon Train (S1E14 - “The Julie Gage Story”).

In December 1960, Komack appeared as Dr. Franklin in the episode "Emergency" of the CBS anthology series, The DuPont Show with June Allyson.

Komack was the guiding force behind several television hits. After directing "Some Tarzans" for TV in Mexico, he returned to Los Angeles in the late 1960s to create The Courtship of Eddie's Father and also appeared as "Uncle Norman" Tinker. He appeared in and created Me and Maxx, whose title character was inspired by and named after his daughter. He also appeared in Get Smart, created Chico and the Man (including directing the "Sammy Steps In" episode with Sammy Davis Jr.) and helped produce Welcome Back, Kotter. Komack is credited with discovering and launching the careers of John Travolta and Freddie Prinze. He was director of the Star Trek: The Original Series episode "A Piece of the Action".

Komack was the creator and executive producer of the short-lived 1978 CBS situation comedy Another Day and directed the last of the original Porky's films, Porky's Revenge!, in 1985.

During his career peak years, he lived with his wife Cluny and daughter Maxine in Beverly Hills, where their lifestyle could easily serve as the premise for another TV comedy, "it is like open house 24 hours a day," he described it.

== Death ==
Komack died of heart problems at Cedars-Sinai Hospital in Los Angeles, California on December 24, 1997, at the age of 73.

== Awards and nominations ==
Year	Award	Category	Nominated work	Result
1970	22nd Primetime Emmy Awards	Outstanding Comedy Series	The Courtship of Eddie's Father	Nominated
1971	28th Golden Globe Awards	Best Television Series – Musical or Comedy	The Courtship of Eddie's Father	Nominated
1976	33rd Golden Globe Awards	Best Television Series – Musical or Comedy	Chico and the Man	Nominated
1976	28th Primetime Emmy Awards	Outstanding Comedy Series	Welcome Back, Kotter	Nominated
