= The Other Man =

The Other Man may refer to:

== Film ==
- The Other Man (1916 film), a film starring Fatty Arbuckle
- The Other Man (1918), a silent film directed by Paul Scardon
- The Other Man (1970), an NBC television film directed by Richard A. Colla, based on the 1963 novel Mrs. Maitland's Affair by Margaret Lynn
- The Other Man (1973 film), an Egyptian drama film
- Doosra Aadmi (1977), translated as The Other Man, a Hindi-language romantic drama film
- The Other Man (2008 film), a film starring Laura Linney, Liam Neeson and Antonio Banderas

== Literature ==
- "The Other Man" (short story) (1888), a short story by Rudyard Kipling
- The Nine Bears (1910), a novel by Edgar Wallace, published under the American alternative title The Other Man
- The Other Man (1932), a novel by Katharine Tynan
- The Other Man (1947), a novel by Angus MacVicar
- The Other Man (1958), a novel by Francis Durbridge
- The Other Man (1995), a novel by Karen Van der Zee
- "The Other Man" (2017), a short story in The Refugees

== Music ==
- "The Other Man" (song) (2001), a song by Canadian rock band Sloan

== Television ==
- The Other Man (1956), a BBC television serial starring Tony Britton and Duncan Lamont, directed by Alan Bromly
- The Other Man (Play of the Week), a 1964 television play

=== Episodes ===
- "Chapter 3: The Other Man", Trial & Error season 1, episode 3 (2017)
- "The Other Man", Acropolis Now series 5, episode 4 (1992)
- "The Other Man", Master of None season 1, episode 5 (2015)
- "The Other Man", Special Branch series 3, episode 10 (1973)
- "The Other Man", The Middle season 9, episode 12 (2018)
- "The Other Man", The Ropers season 2, episode 12 (1979)

== See also ==
- Other Minds (disambiguation)
- Other People (disambiguation)
- Other Worlds (disambiguation)
- The Other Girl (disambiguation)
- The Other One (disambiguation)
- The Other Woman (disambiguation)
