= Ethel Owen =

American actress (1893–1997)

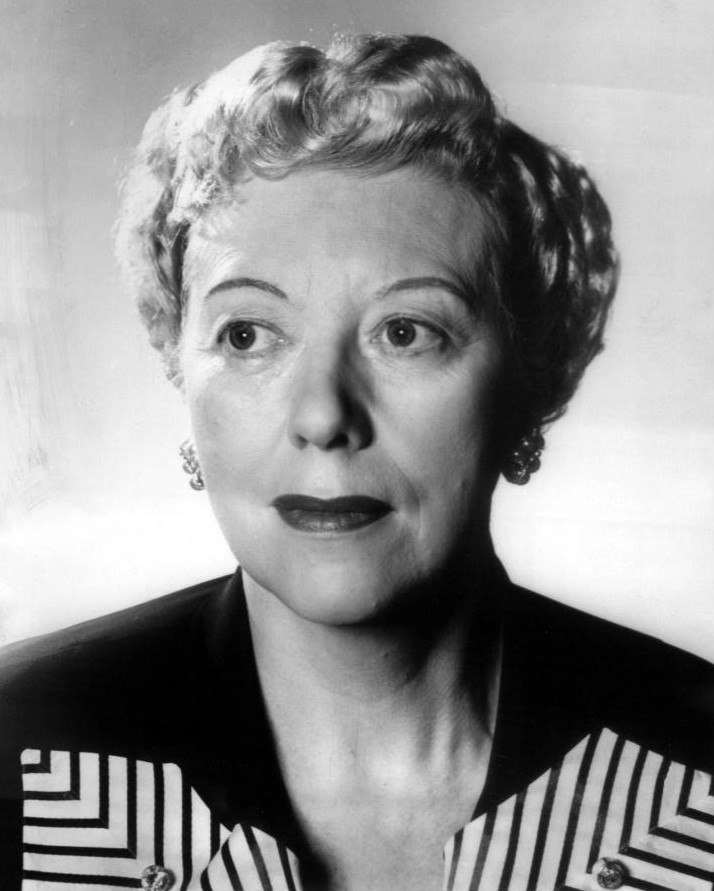
- Owen in 1952
- Born: Ethel Marguerite Waite; March 30, 1893; Chicago, Illinois, U.S.
- Died: February 16, 1997 (aged 103); Savannah, Georgia, U.S.
- Occupation: Actress
- Years active: 1907–1956
- Spouses: Raymond G. Owens (m. 1919; died 1926) John Hale Almy (m. 1949; died 1967)
- Children: 3, including Pamela Britton

Ethel Owen (née Ethel Marguerite Waite; March 30, 1893 – February 16, 1997) was an American actress with a lengthy career on stage as well as radio and television. In her early sixties, during the mid-1950s, she had a memorable recurring TV role on The Honeymooners, playing Mrs. Gibson, Ralph Kramden's sharp-tongued, interloping mother-in-law.

== Early years, marriage and three daughters ==
Born in Chicago, Ethel Marguerite Waite started performing around 1907, at age 14. Although she is credited with appearances on a number of vaudeville circuits, her primary venue was the legitimate stage, mostly as a member of regional touring theatre groups. Following marriage, in her early twenties, to a Wisconsin veterinarian, Raymond G. Owens, on June 19, 1919, she had three daughters. Her eldest child, Mary, would later move to Texas, where in Fort Worth she worked professionally as a social worker; however, Ethel's younger girls, Virginia and Armilda Jane, followed their mother into show business as actresses.

While raising a family, Ethel Waite continued to act but under the new stage name "Ethel Owen", although she opted to drop the "s" in her married surname. Daughter Armilda Jane, born in Milwaukee in 1923, even began her own career as a child actress in her mother's plays. Well known in summer stock by her tenth birthday, she was offered a film contract at a time when the popularity and rising success of Shirley Temple on screen prompted various studios to conduct searches for other young talented performers, but her mother decided against the move to motion pictures. In succeeding years, Armilda Jane became a teenage performer in musical comedy and, changing her stage name to Pamela Britton, had co-starring roles on Broadway and in a few films, including two classics, the 1945 musical Anchors Aweigh, playing Frank Sinatra's Brooklyn-accented girlfriend, and the 1950 noir, D.O.A.. Eventually, Britton moved to TV sitcoms, appearing, for example, as the scatterbrained title character in Blondie (1957), and as the inquisitive landlady, Mrs. Brown, in My Favorite Martian (1963–1966).

The middle daughter, Virginia (1921-2011), proceeded in her mother's footsteps by retaining her own given name and likewise adopting "Owen" as a stage surname. Put under contract with RKO Pictures, she was mentioned in Louella Parsons' November 26, 1946 column, regarding "an interesting announcement" soon to be made concerning "William Hornstein, a Los Angeles business executive", but no further details were revealed until over three years later, when another story described Virginia Owens' 1950 marriage to University of North Carolina graduate William A. Loock Jr. During her brief 1946–48 sojourn into film acting at RKO, the sole on-screen credit she received was for playing dance-hall girl Ginger Kelly, fifth-billed second female lead in Zane Grey-based Thunder Mountain, the first of 29 entries in Tim Holt's 1947–52 B-western series.

== As a New York actress, on Broadway and radio ==
At the start of the Depression 1930s, the Owens family left Milwaukee to settle in New York City, where Ethel Owen, now in her late thirties and early forties, found steady work in regional theatre, radio plays and even the black operetta, Africana, with a mixed cast, which had its November 26, 1934 opening night at Broadway's newly renamed Venice Theatre disrupted by a man claiming to be the story's uncredited co-author. Saddled with negative reviews (The New York Times called it "Whimper of the Jungle"), the show closed on the 28th.

Much and, eventually, most of her work came from radio, the prime home entertainment medium of the 1930s and 1940s. The tens of thousands of broadcast hours, especially those featuring dramatic presentations, required a constant supply of voice professionals who were called upon to perform in multiple shows within the course of a single day, thus making the list of credits for a hard working performer such as Ethel Owen run into the thousands. One of her most-consistent regular assignments was on the long-running 1936–57 police series Gang Busters which featured listener participation in apprehending criminals. She also played Abbey Trowbridge in the soap opera Valiant Lady.

In 1926, the newly-widowed actress continued her non-stop working schedule during the World War II years, while still looking after her daughters. In 1943–44 and in 1946, she was in two Broadway shows, the Phoebe and Henry Ephron comedy Three's a Family and the revival of Show Boat. The three-act Family, which Henry Ephron also directed, opened at the Longacre Theatre on May 5, 1943 and ran for 497 performances, transferring to the Belasco Theatre on May 28, 1944, and closing there on July 8. Show Boat, with music by Jerome Kern and lyrics by Oscar Hammerstein II, opened at the Ziegfeld Theatre on January 5, 1946, eight weeks after Kern's death on November 11, 1945. The production, with 115 cast members, including Ethel Owen in the non-singing role of Parthy Hawks, the mother of Magnolia, played by Jan Clayton, counted 418 performances, closing on January 4, 1947 — the longest-running revival of a stage musical at that point in Broadway history.

Ethel Owen married insurance executive John Hale Almy (1886–1967) on April 2, 1949. They lived in New York City's affluent suburb of Bronxville. It was there, in March 1950, that the wedding of Virginia Owen to William A. Loock Jr. was held, with John Hale Almy giving his stepdaughter in marriage.

== On television ==
Starting in 1947–48, at the dawn of a period referenced as the Golden Age of Television, Owen began appearing in the numerous live drama series emanating from New York. One of her earliest performances was in the title role of "Old Lady Robbins", the November 3, 1948 episode of NBC's hour-long series Kraft Television Theatre. Also in the presentation, in her first screen appearance, was eighteen-year-old Grace Kelly. Owen's other dramatic roles included roles in shows such as Inner Sanctum, Armstrong Circle Theatre, and the two-part 1954 Robert Montgomery Presents Christmastime production of "The Reward," an adaptation of Charles Dickens' David Copperfield, in which she portrayed Aunt Betsey.

Owen's gained recognition for the frequent appearances she made between 1952-1957 on various incarnations of CBS's popular Jackie Gleason Show, specifically for her sketch comedy work on The Honeymooners.

== Final years ==
Ethel Owen gradually retired from acting in the mid-1960s, upon reaching her early seventies. She died in Savannah, Georgia in 1997, six weeks short of her 104th birthday, outliving by almost 71 years her first husband, Raymond Owens, and, by more than two decades, their youngest daughter Armilda (best known as actress Pamela Britton), who died in 1974 at the age of 50 from cancer.

Four days before Ethel Owen's death, a story in a local publication reported on a production of Brigadoon at the Contra Costa Musical Theatre. Owen's granddaughter (by Britton), chorus member Kathy Ferber, is described as taking center stage at the final bows as a tribute to her mother who had played Meg Brockie in the original 1947–48 Broadway production. Ferber also referenced her 103-year-old grandmother in the tribute.
