= Ann Barnes =

American actress (1945–2005)

- Ann Barnes (as Dixie Ann Barnes) on Classics Records' "Soda Pop Babies" Audio CD
- Born: Dixie Ann Cheney; June 17, 1945; Lansing, Michigan, U.S.
- Died: September 13, 2005 (aged 60); Lansing, Michigan, U.S.
- Other name: Dixie Ann Barnes

Ann Barnes (born Dixie Ann Cheney; June 17, 1945 – September 13, 2005) was an American actress and pop singer, best known for appearing as Cookie Bumstead on the short-lived television series Blondie (1957), based on the popular Chic Young comic strip.

== Biography ==
Barnes attracted a casting director's attention because of her resemblance to Pamela Britton.

When Blondie was cancelled after 28 episodes, Barnes appeared on other television series, including NBC Matinee Theater, Leave it to Beaver, and My Three Sons.

When even these acting roles dried up, Barnes took a brief stab at a recording career, recording a bouncy pop ballad called "Whispering Wind", circa 1962. Recording under the name Dixie Ann Barnes, she sang about every teenage girl's lament: puppy love. "Whispering Wind" can be found on the pop CD anthologies Soda Pop Babies and Restless Doll. Barnes is pictured on the cover of Soda Pop Babies.

According to the liner notes in Soda Pop Babies, Barnes was crowned the "Princess of Hollywood" for April 1962, by the Hollywood Chamber of Commerce.

According to long-time colleague and fellow child actor Paul Petersen, Barnes had a difficult childhood at the hands of abusive parents. In her adult life, she rarely spoke about her years in show business, and reclaimed her birth name of Dixie Ann Cheney.

Barnes eventually returned to her birth town of Lansing, Michigan, to retire. She died on September 13, 2005. According to Petersen, the body of this forgotten, exploited talent was not discovered for almost a week.

In 2005, Petersen wrote a loving tribute to his colleague and friend on his website devoted to advocacy for former and current child performers, A Minor Consideration. Entitled "When Sparrows Fall", Petersen recounts the lives and obscure deaths of two child actors, Ann Barnes and Tommy Bond.
