= The Other Woman =

The Other Woman or The Other Women may refer to:

- Mistress, a woman in an intimate relationship with a man who is married to a different woman

== Film and television ==
=== Films ===
- The Other Woman (1918 film), an American silent drama film
- The Other Woman (1921 film), an American silent drama film
- The Other Woman (1924 film), a German silent drama film
- The Other Woman (1931 film), a British drama film
- The Other Woman (1954 film), an American film noir by Hugo Haas
- The Other Woman, a 1959 Hong Kong film directed by Griffin Yueh Feng
- The Other Woman, an alternate title for As a Wife, As a Woman, a 1961 Japanese film by Mikio Naruse
- The Other Woman, a 1978 Egyptian drama film directed by Ashraf Fahmy
- The Other Woman (1983 film), a made-for-television film written by and starring Anne Meara
- The Other Woman (1995 film), a made-for-television film
- The Other Woman (2006 film), or The Unknown Woman, a 2006 Italian film
- The Other Woman, a 2008 television film adaptation of the Fielding novel, directed by and featuring Jason Priestley
- Souten: The Other Woman, a 2006 Indian drama film
- The Other Woman (2009 film), a 2009 American film starring Natalie Portman
- The Other Woman (2014 film), a 2014 American comedy film directed by Nick Cassavetes

=== Television episodes ===
- "The Other Woman", 90 Day Fiancé: The Other Way season 3, episode 7 (2021)
- "The Other Woman", ABC's Matinee Today episode 2 (1973)
- "The Other Woman", Bergerac series 7, episode 4 (1989)
- "The Other Woman", Blondie (1957) episode 4 (1954)
- "The Other Woman", December Bride season 4, episode 8 (1957)
- "The Other Woman", Doc (1975) season 1, episode 3 (1975)
- "The Other Woman", Family Ties season 6, episode 4 (1987)
- "The Other Woman", Feud season 1, episode 2 (2017)
- "The Other Woman", Heathcliff (1984) season 1, episode 42b (1984)
- "The Other Woman", Laverne & Shirley season 6, episode 7 (1981)
- "The Other Woman", Lost season 4, episode 6 (2008)
- "The Other Woman", Mad Men season 5, episode 11 (2012)
- "The Other Woman", Maggie (1998) episode 2 (1998)
- "The Other Woman", Matlock (1986) season 3, episode 11 (1989)
- "The Other Woman", Mister Ed season 1, episode 22 (1961)
- "The Other Woman", My Three Sons season 9, episode 20 (1969)
- "The Other Woman", Offspring season 1, episode 10 (2010)
- "The Other Woman", On the Buses series 4, episode 4 (1970)
- "The Other Woman", Pacific Palisades episode 3 (1997)
- "The Other Woman", Petticoat Junction season 7, episode 3 (1969)
- "The Other Woman", Play for Today series 6, episode 11 (1976)
- "The Other Woman", Scandal season 2, episode 2 (2012)
- "The Other Woman", That Girl season 2, episode 21 (1968)
- "The Other Woman", The 5 Mrs. Buchanans episode 2 (1994)
- "The Other Woman", The Ann Sothern Show season 3, episode 12 (1960)
- "The Other Woman", The Closer season 2, episode 10 (2006)
- "The Other Woman", The Dumplings episode 8 (1976)
- "The Other Woman", The Jeffersons season 5, episode 18 (1979)
- "The Other Woman", The Ropers season 2, episode 17 (1980)
- "The Other Woman", To Have & to Hold (Philippine) episode 21 (2021)
- "The Other Woman", What I Like About You season 1, episode 11 (2003)
- "The Other Woman", Wilderness episode 2 (2023)

== Literature ==
- "The Other Woman", a 1891 short story by Richard Harding Davis, first published in Scribner's Magazine and featured as the third segment of the 1891 book Gallegher, and Other Stories
- The Other Woman, a 1905 novel by L. T. Meade
- The Other Woman, a 1917 novel by Octavus Roy Cohen and John Ulrich Giesy
- The Other Woman, a 1972 novel by Rona Jaffe
- The Other Woman, a 1980 novel by Jessica Steele
- The Other Woman, a 1983 novel by Joy Fielding
- The Other Woman, a 1992 Lloyd & Hill novel by Jill McGown
- The Other Woman, a 1995 novel by Francine Pascal; the sixteenth installment in the Sweet Valley University series
- The Other Woman, a 2001 novel by Patricia Kay
- The Other Woman, a 2003 novel by Eric Jerome Dickey
- The Other Woman, a 2005 novel by Iris Gower
- The Other Woman, a 2005 novel by Jane Green
- The Other Woman, a 2006 novel by Brenda Novak
- The Other Woman (Ryan novel), a 2012 novel by Hank Phillippi Ryan
- The Other Woman, a 2015 memoir by Toby Olson
- The Other Woman, a 2017 novel by Laura Wilson
- The Other Woman (Silva novel), a 2018 novel by Daniel Silva

== Music ==
=== Albums ===
- The Other Woman (Ray Price album), 1965, with the title song "The Other Woman (In My Life)"
- The Other Woman (Ray Parker, Jr. album), 1982
- The Other Woman, Michael Dunford of Renaissance album, 1994
- The Other Woman (Miss Jones album), 1998
- The Other Woman (Deni Hines and James Morrison album), 2007
- The Other Women (album), a 2000 album by The Corn Sisters

=== Songs ===
- "The Other Woman", a song written by Jessie Mae Robinson and performed by Sarah Vaughan in 1957, by Nina Simone from the 1959 album Nina Simone at Town Hall, and covered by Lana Del Rey, Jeff Buckley, and Anne Sofie von Otter.
- "The Other Woman" (Ray Parker Jr. song), 1982
- "The Other Woman" (Loretta Lynn song), 1963

== See also ==
- Other Women (disambiguation)
- The Other Girl (disambiguation)
