= Other Women =

Other Women may refer to:

- "Other Women", television series episode of Charmed
- "Other Women", 2018 television series episode, see list of The Handmaid's Tale episodes

== See also ==
- The Other Woman (disambiguation)
