= A Letter for Evie =

1946 film by Jules Dassin

- Film poster
- Directed by: Jules Dassin
- Written by: Alan Friedman; DeVallon Scott
- Based on: The Adventure of a Ready Letter Writer; 1920 story in The Saturday Evening Post by Blanche Brace
- Produced by: William H. Wright
- Starring: Marsha Hunt; John Carroll; Hume Cronyn; Spring Byington; Pamela Britton
- Cinematography: Karl Freund
- Edited by: Chester W. Schaeffer
- Music by: George Bassman
- Production company: Metro-Goldwyn-Mayer
- Distributed by: Loew's Inc.
- Release date: June 27, 1946
- Running time: 89 minutes
- Country: United States
- Language: English

A Letter for Evie is a 1946 American comedy film directed by Jules Dassin and starring Marsha Hunt, John Carroll and Hume Cronyn. It was produced by Metro-Goldwyn-Mayer. The story is a spinoff of Cyrano de Bergerac, updated to a modern setting.

== Plot ==
In the last months of World War II, New York City girl Evie O'Connor works as a secretary for the Trojan Shirt Co. in Brooklyn, which provides uniform shirts to the Army. She has her mind set on finding a tall, strong man to marry—one that can wear a Trojan shirt with a 16 1/2 neck size.

She writes a short letter and puts it in a shirt that eventually ends up on Private Edgar "Wolf" Larsen, who has quite a reputation as a ladies' man. Wolf reads the letter aloud to his bunk mate, John Phoneas McPherson, then throws it away. John picks it up again and becomes interested in finding the woman behind the letter. Although John is not big and strong like Wolf, but short and small, he decides to pursue Evie by writing her back.

John and Evie become pen pals, but when she asks for a picture of him, he sends her a picture of Wolf. He is afraid she will lose interest if he admits to not being of the same size and dimension.

Some time later, John's unit passes through New York, and he goes to see Evie, posing as his own friend, Wolf. He is smitten at first sight. The two get along wonderfully, but he is afraid that if she discovers his deception she will hate him. He continues the masquerade. Wolf finds out about the correspondence between John and Evie, and makes a surprise visit at Evie's place when John is there. Wolf takes her in his arms and kisses her, pretending to be the man who wrote the letters. Evie is at first madly in love with him, but soon realized that the chemistry she felt in the letters is missing. He explains that he can be eloquent when writing, but not when speaking.

A commotion occurs when John tries to stop Evie and Wolf from being alone with each other; he is also fending off the advances of Evie's roommate, Barney Lee, who is attracted to him. He eventually pretends to be drunk and forces Wolf and Evie apart.

Jealous, John strikes Wolf outside Evie's apartment and tells him to stay away from "his" girl. Wolf ignores John's command and meets Evie again in secret. John finds out about their meetings when Wolf answers her phone call.

John rushes to Evie's apartment building and starts a fire to smoke the couple out. In the ensuing commotion, Wolf trips and falls, hurting his head. Not in his right mind, Wolf asks Evie to marry him. She accepts, but the marriage is postponed because the unit is to be shipped overseas the next morning. While in Europe, Wolf meets and marries a French girl, leaving John to tell Evie the truth.

Evie has not received any letters from John for several months and is becoming worried. She goes to visit John's family in New York. While there, she looks through a photo album and discovers that the man whose home she is visiting, the man who wrote her the letters, is the man she knows as Larson. She is heartbroken, and back home she cries to her roommate that she never wants to see either man again. She also confesses to being confused as to which man she really loved: the one who kissed her, or the one who wrote the letters.

Meanwhile, John, who doesn't know that Evie knows the truth, is trying to figure out how to break the news to her. Just released from the Army hospital with a wounded leg, he decides to protect both Wolf's honor and Evie's faith by telling her that John is dead, and that he died loving her. He gives Evie his purple heart. Evie realizes that this is the man who loves her, and this is the man whom she loves. She is delighted, and they unite in a kiss.

== Cast ==
- Marsha Hunt as Evie O'Connor
- John Carroll as Edgar 'Wolf' Larson
- Hume Cronyn as John Phineas McPherson
- Spring Byington as Mrs. McPherson
- Pamela Britton as Barney Lee
- Norman Lloyd as DeWitt Pynchon
- Percival Vivian as Mr. McPherson
- Donald Curtis as Capt. Budlowe
- Esther Howard as Mrs. Edgewaters
- Robin Raymond as Eloise Edgewaters
