= The Other Girl =

The Other Girl can mean:

- The Other Girl, a 1903 stage play by Augustus Thomas
  - The Other Girl, a 1915 or 1916 film adaptation of the play starring boxer James J. Corbett
- The Other Girl (film), 1917 film
- "The Other Girl" (song), 2020 song

== See also ==
- No Other Girl (song), a 1981 song by The Blasters off the eponymous album The Blasters
- The Other Woman (disambiguation)
