= Pamela Britton =

American actress and singer (1923–1974)

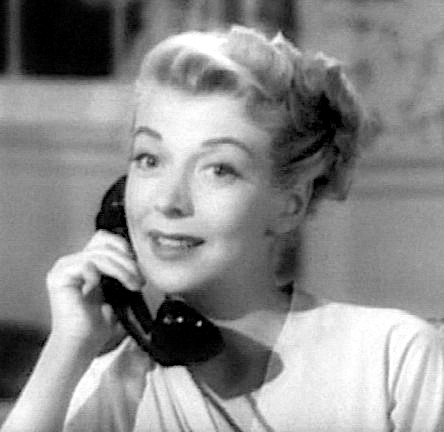
- Britton in the film D.O.A. (1950)
- Born: Armilda Jane Owens; March 19, 1923; Milwaukee, Wisconsin, U.S.
- Died: June 17, 1974 (aged 51); Arlington Heights, Illinois, U.S.
- Other name: Gloria Owen
- Education: State Teacher's Normal School, Milwaukee, Wisconsin
- Occupation: Actress
- Years active: 1945–1973
- Spouse: Arthur Steel (m. 1945)
- Children: 1
- Parent(s): Raymond Owens and Ethel Waite

Pamela Britton (born Armilda Jane Owens; March 19, 1923 – June 17, 1974) was an American actress, best known for appearing as Lorelei Brown in the television series My Favorite Martian (1963–1966) and for her female lead in the film noir classic D.O.A. (1950). Throughout her acting career, Britton appeared often on Broadway and in several Hollywood and television films.

== Early career ==
Britton's mother was Ethel Waite (known as Ethel Waite Owen and Ethel Owen), a stage, radio, and early television actress who played Ralph Kramden's mother-in-law in the Honeymooners TV show of the 1950s. She had two sisters: Virginia, who was an actress for RKO Radio Pictures; and Mary, a social worker. Armilda attended Holy Angels Academy and the State Teacher's Normal School in her home town of Milwaukee.

By the age of nine she was doing summer stock, and Hollywood came calling at age ten. Her mother rejected the advances, saying she wanted her to be an actress, not a child star. Owens started auditioning for roles at the age of 15, using the name "Gloria Jane Owen". She found that as soon as people knew who her mother was, they expected her to be as accomplished an actress. She used a pseudonym to audition, choosing Pamela (from a British book) and Britton (to emphasize the source).

== Theatre work ==
Courtesy of MGM, Britton helped entertain the troops in November 1944 at Camp Roberts, California, starring in The New Moon along with Joseph Sullivan. After a stint touring with bandleader Don McGuire, Britton's big break came when she was cast as "Gertie" and also understudied Celeste Holm (in the role of "Ado Annie") in the original Broadway production of Oklahoma! She played Meg Brockie in the Broadway production of Brigadoon (1947). When Oklahoma! went on tour, she took over Holm's role as Ado Annie.

== Hollywood ==
Britton's first role in a major production was as Frank Sinatra's girlfriend in Anchors Aweigh. Afterward, however, came a forgettable part in A Letter for Evie in 1946. She went on hiatus to play the comic role of Meg Brockie in the original 1947 production of Brigadoon on Broadway. She returned to the big screen opposite Clark Gable in Key to the City (1950), and then went on to make her most significant film appearance in the classic D.O.A., also in 1950. She made her third film of the year in the Red Skelton vehicle, Watch the Birdie (1951). About 19 years passed before she returned to the big screen.

Britton portrayed the title role of the TV version of the Chic Young newspaper comic strip Blondie (1957), opposite Arthur Lake as her husband, Dagwood Bumstead. She reprised her role in Brigadoon in 1954, appeared in Annie Get Your Gun at the Santa Barbara Bowl, and then returned to Broadway to replace an ailing Janis Paige in Guys and Dolls.

=== My Favorite Martian ===
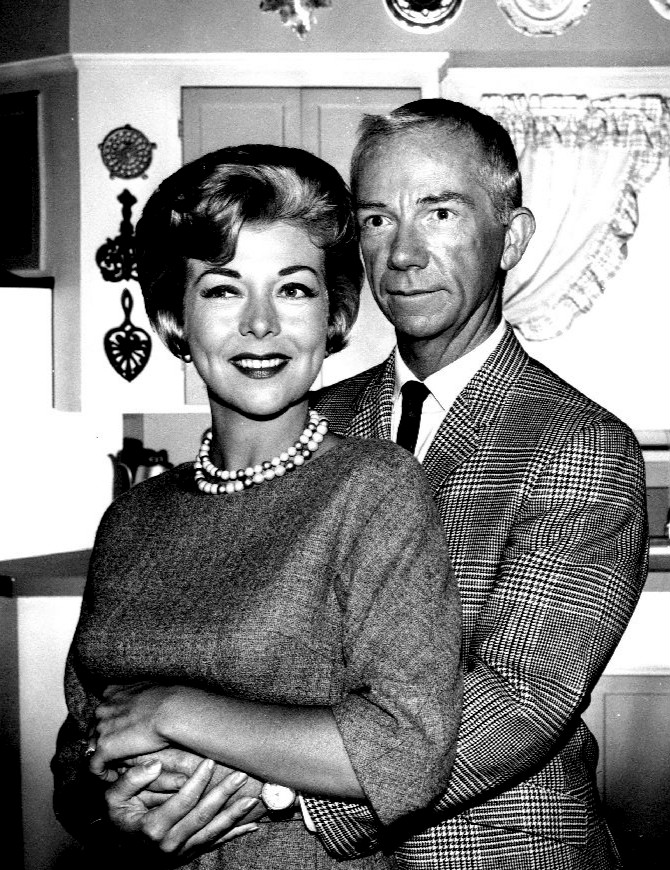
Britton as Lorelei Brown, 1963

What is perhaps her signature role began in 1963 and lasted until 1966 when she appeared as the nosy and ditzy landlady, Mrs. Lorelei Brown, in My Favorite Martian. After the series ended, Britton appeared in the movies, If It's Tuesday, This Must Be Belgium and Suppose They Gave a War and Nobody Came.

== Personal life and death ==
Britton was married on April 8, 1943, in Texas, to Captain Arthur Steel after they met on a blind date arranged by one of her sisters. After the wedding, he was posted to Italy on active service while Britton remained working at home. They had a daughter, Katherine Lee (born September 8, 1946). After the war, Steel worked as an advertising executive and went on to manage the Gene Autry hotels (Steel and Autry were first cousins). As their daughter grew up, Britton worked mainly in West Coast theater. After performing on tour with Don Knotts in The Mind with the Dirty Man, Britton was admitted to Northwest Community Hospital in Arlington Heights, Illinois, where she died of brain cancer on June 17, 1974, aged 51.

== Filmography ==
| Year | Title | Role | Notes |
|---|---|---|---|
| 1945 | Anchors Aweigh | Girl from Brooklyn | |
| 1946 | A Letter for Evie | Barney Lee | |
| 1950 | D.O.A. | Paula Gibson | |
| 1950 | Key to the City | Miss Unconscious | |
| 1950 | Watch the Birdie | Mrs. Shanway | |
| 1969 | If It's Tuesday, This Must Be Belgium | Freda | |
| 1970 | Suppose They Gave a War and Nobody Came | Sgt. Graham | |

== Television ==
| Year | Title | Role | Notes |
|---|---|---|---|
| 1950 | The Silver Theatre | Marge Porter | |
| 1954 | Blondie | Blondie | TV Movie, unsold pilot |
| 1956 | Damon Runyon Theater | Zelda | |
| 1957 | Blondie | Blondie Bumstead | 26 episodes |
| 1960 | 77 Sunset Strip | Paula Conway | |
| 1961 | Peter Gunn | Vicki Landell | S3.E21 "Than a Serpent's Tooth" |
| 1961 | Gunslinger | Peggy Morgan | |
| 1962 | Father of the Bride | Gladys Marshall | S1.E19 "The Pine Pillow" |
| 1963-1966 | My Favorite Martian | Mrs. Lorelei Brown, Lorelei Glutz (S3.E1) | 62 episodes |
| 1973 | The Magician | Betty Foster | |
