= John L. Greene =

American screenwriter

- Born: November 10, 1912; Buffalo, New York, U.S.
- Died: October 4, 1995 (aged 82); Los Angeles, California, U.S.
- Education: State University of Iowa
- Occupations: Screenwriter, radio writer
- Years active: 1930s–1976
- Spouse: Helen Greene
- Children: 2

John L. Greene (November 10, 1912 – October 4, 1995) was an American screenwriter. He was the creator of the American science fiction sitcom My Favorite Martian.

Greene started his career in the 1930s writing for radio programs. He started writing for television in 1951 on the short film Tinhorn Troubadors. His television credits include The Adventures of Ozzie and Harriet, Our Miss Brooks, Bewitched, Petticoat Junction, The Real McCoys, The Andy Griffith Show, Green Acres and I Dream of Jeannie. He retired in 1976, last writing credits being for 2 episodes of Chico and the Man.

Greene died in October 1995 of natural causes in Los Angeles, California, at the age of 82.
