= My Favorite Martian =

American sitcom (1963–1966)

- Title card
- Genre: Sitcom
- Created by: John L. Greene
- Starring: Ray Walston; Bill Bixby; Alan Hewitt; Pamela Britton
- Theme music composer: George Greeley
- Composer: George Greeley
- Country of origin: United States
- No. of seasons: 3
- No. of episodes: 107 (75 in black-and-white, 32 in color)

Production
- Executive producer: Harry Poppe
- Producer: Jack Chertok
- Camera setup: Single-camera
- Running time: 25 minutes
- Production companies: Jack Chertok Television Productions; CBS Television Network

Original release
- Network: CBS
- Release: September 29, 1963 – May 1, 1966

Related
- My Favorite Martians

My Favorite Martian is an American sitcom that aired on CBS from September 29, 1963, to May 1, 1966, for 107 episodes. The show stars Ray Walston as "Uncle Martin" (the Martian) and Bill Bixby as Tim O'Hara. My Favorite Martian was one of the first of the "fantasy" situation comedies prevalent on American television in the mid-1960s featuring characters who could do extraordinary things, predating My Living Doll (1964–1965), Bewitched (1964–1972), and I Dream of Jeannie (1965–1970). The first two seasons, totaling 75 episodes, were in black and white, and the 32 episodes of the third and final season were filmed in color.

John L. Greene created the central characters and developed the core format of the series, which was produced by Jack Chertok.

== Premise ==
A human-looking extraterrestrial in a one-man spaceship nearly collides at high altitude with the U.S. Air Force's rocket plane, the North American X-15. The spaceship's pilot is a 450-year-old anthropologist from Mars. Tim O'Hara, a young newspaper reporter for The Los Angeles Sun, is on his way home from Edwards Air Force Base, where he had gone to report on the flight of the X-15. Returning home to Los Angeles, O'Hara spots the same silver spaceship crash land nearby.

Tim takes in the Martian, saying to other people that he is Tim's Uncle Martin. The Martian refuses to reveal any of his special traits to humans, other than Tim, to avoid both publicity and human panic. Tim agrees to keep the Martian's Earth identity a secret while he attempts to repair his spaceship. Uncle Martin has various unusual powers: He can raise two retractable antennae from the back of his head and become invisible; he is telepathic and can read and influence minds; he can levitate objects with the motion of his index finger; he can communicate with animals; he can freeze people or objects; and he can speed himself (and other people) up to do any kind of work.

Also an inventor, Uncle Martin builds several advanced devices, such as a time machine that transports Tim and the Martian to England in the Middle Ages and other times and places, such as St. Louis in 1849 and the early days of Hollywood, and brings Leonardo da Vinci and Jesse James into the present. Another device he builds is a "molecular separator" that can take apart the molecules of a physical object, or rearrange them (making a squirrel into a human). Another device can take memories and store them in pill form to "relearn" them later. Other devices create temporary duplicates, or levitate Martin and others without the need of his index finger.

Tim and Uncle Martin live in a garage apartment owned by a congenial but scatterbrained landlady, Mrs. Lorelei Brown (a former WAVE as revealed in the first episode of season one) who often shows up when not wanted. The Martian and she have an awkward romance from time to time, but Uncle Martin never gets serious for fear of his ultimately going home to Mars. She later dates a vain, cold-hearted, plain-clothes police officer, Detective Bill Brennan, who dislikes Uncle Martin and is highly suspicious of him and his activities.

"Martin O'Hara's" real name is actually Exigius 12 1/2. Revealed in the episode "We Love You, Miss Pringle", it was heard again when his real nephew, Andromeda (played by young actor Wayne Stam), crash-landed on Earth late in the show's third season. Andromeda, originally devised to bring younger viewers to the show, disappeared without explanation after this single episode, and was not referred to again in the live-action series' eight remaining episodes. Andromeda was, however, a regular on the later My Favorite Martians animated series. Andromeda had a single antenna, which Martin explained was because his baby antennae had fallen out and only one adult antenna had come in so far. Uncle Martin also reveals that on Mars he lives on Fulton Canal, which ultimately leads to comedic mix-ups and confusion with Canal Fulton, Ohio.

== Cast ==
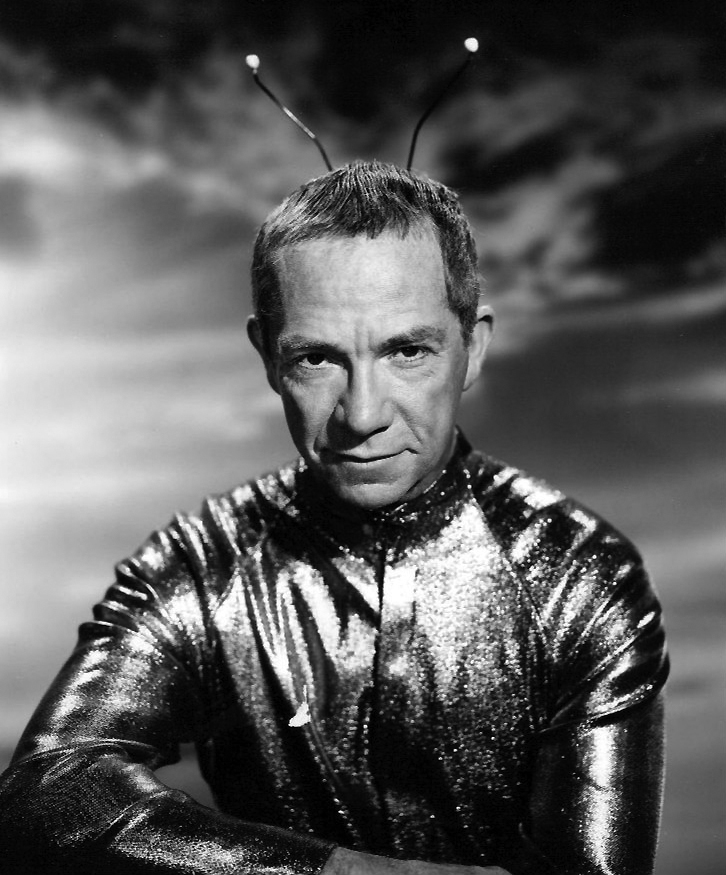
Ray Walston as Uncle Martin O'Hara

- Ray Walston as Uncle Martin O'Hara (The Martian)
- Bill Bixby as Tim O'Hara
- Pamela Britton as Mrs. Lorelei Brown
- J. Pat O'Malley as Mr. Burns, Tim's boss (first season)
- Alan Hewitt as Detective Bill Brennan (second and third seasons)
- Roy Engel as Police Captain (third season)

== Production ==
=== Broadcast ===
The series was produced by Jack Chertok Television in association with CBS Productions. The show was originally syndicated by Wolper Pictures, then it moved to syndicator Telepictures, and finally by successor-in-interest to Warner Bros. Television Distribution.

=== Music ===
The theme music for the series was composed by George Greeley and performed in part on an Electro-Theremin by Paul Tanner, a former member of Glenn Miller's band. It was influential in Brian Wilson's engagement of Tanner in 1965 and 1966 to work with the Beach Boys on their landmark hit, "Good Vibrations". Greeley also scored the series; an album of his music from the first two seasons was released by La-La Land Records in 2007 (dedicated to the composer, who died while the album was being prepared).

=== Filming ===
Unhappy with early script submissions from creator/producer Jack Chertok, the network hired script doctor Sherwood Schwartz to lend a hand. Schwartz changed the Tim-centric scripts to focus more on the Martian, as a "fish out of water", on, as he termed it "this backwards planet." The pilot featured Mrs. Brown's niece, Annabelle, as Tim's love interest, but she was dropped to allow Tim to become more of a playboy. In a major change, Mrs. Brown, who was multi-talented, intelligent, and suspicious in the pilot, became decidedly more scatterbrained.

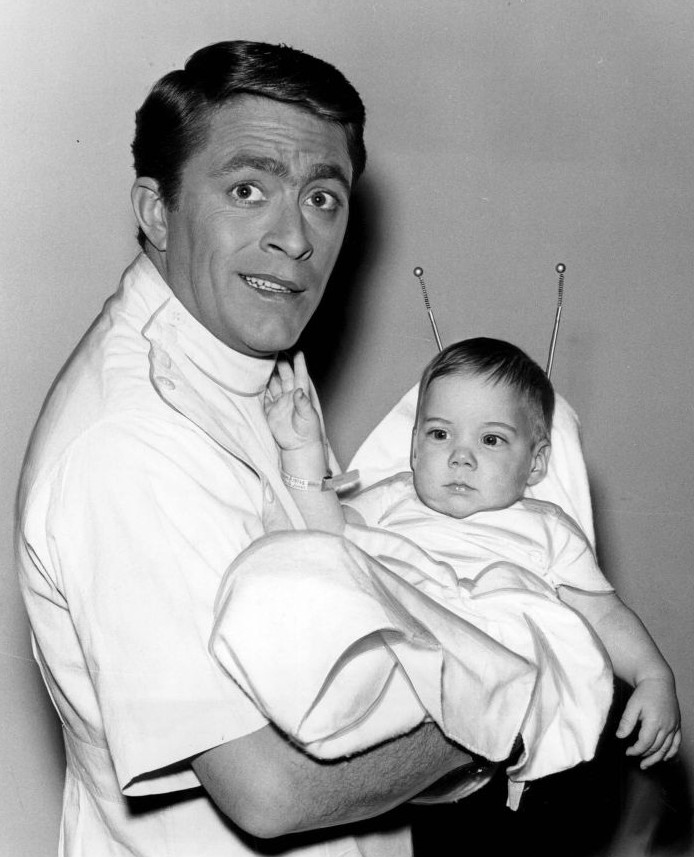
Bill Bixby in a 1965 episode when a malfunction takes Uncle Martin back to babyhood

Tim actor Bill Bixby said that co-star Ray Walston served as a mentor to him during their time on the show, stating that "I can see the change between the first and third year and my growth as an actor is due directly to Ray Walston. He was my teacher, my on-the-job-training teacher."

The first two seasons were filmed in black-and-white (at Desilu), but the final season was shot in color (at MGM), resulting in minor changes in the set and the format of the show. In addition to the extraterrestrial powers indicated in the first two seasons, Martin was able to do much more in the final season, such as stimulating mustache growth to provide Tim and himself with quick disguises, and levitating using his nose. Brennan's boss, the police chief, was involved in many episodes in the third season, generally as a device to humiliate the overzealous detective Brennan.

== Episodes ==
=== Series overview ===
| Season | Episodes | Originally released | |
| Season | Episodes | First released | Last released |
|---|---|---|---|
| 1 | 37 | September 29, 1963 | June 28, 1964 |
| 2 | 38 | September 27, 1964 | June 27, 1965 |
| 3 | 32 | September 12, 1965 | May 1, 1966 |

=== Season 1 (1963–64) ===
All episodes in black-and-white

| No. overall | No. in season | Title | Directed by | Written by | Original release date |
|---|---|---|---|---|---|
| 1 | 1 | "My Favorite Martin" | Sheldon Leonard | John L. Greene | September 29, 1963 |
Pilot episode: Newspaper reporter Tim O'Hara (Bill Bixby), while covering a flight of the Air Force X-15, finds a damaged spaceship that contains a genuine Martian (Ray Walston). The Martian is a professor of anthropology who specializes in the planet Earth. Tim brings the injured Martian back to his house. To get past Tim's nosy landlady, Mrs. Lorelei Brown (Pamela Britton), the Martian turns invisible. After writing an article about the pilot of the X-15 seeing a flying saucer, Lt. Murphy (Simon Oakland) comes to question Tim. Tim passes the Martian off as his Uncle Martin. Because he won't reveal his source for the story to Col. Whitehead (Herbert Rudley) of the Air Force, Tim is put in jail. Uncle Martin comes up with a way to get Tim off the hook. Martin now has to find a way to repair his spaceship. (J. Pat O'Malley appears as Harry Burns, Ina Victor as Annabelle, Ann Marshall as Angela Brown, Lee Krieger as Radarman, and Marc Towers as Plainclothes Man.)
| 2 | 2 | "The Matchmakers" | Sidney Miller | John L. Greene; Paul David | October 6, 1963 |
Tim is looking after his boss Mr. Burns dog George. Martin finds out that George is in love with Chloe, the dog from next door. Martin learns from Chloe that her owner, Marsha Carson (Laura Shelton), has had an unhappy experience with a man and now hates all men, leading her to be overly protective of Chloe and preventing George from meeting her. If Tim can't get George to be happy, he's sure Mr. Burns will fire him. Martin suggests that Tim romance Marsha so the dogs can be together. After an engineered meeting, Tim and Marsha do start a relationship, but Angela Brown (Ann Marshall) becomes jealous and suggests to Marsha that Tim is fickle in his affections, reconfirming Marsha's opinion in men and ending the relationship. Martin learns that Marsha's boyfriend Howard Loomis (Linden Chiles) left for Mexico without saying goodbye, and gets in touch with him. Howard comes back, explains why he had to leave, and clears the air with Marsha. Marsha asks Tim to watch Chloe while she and Howard go off to get married. So now everything works out for George and Chloe.
| 3 | 3 | "There Is No Cure for the Common Martian" | Sidney Miller | James Komack | October 13, 1963 |
Uncle Martin's cold wreaks havoc when he disappears upon every sneeze and his antennae are stuck in the "up" position. Meanwhile, Tim is sent to Trimbles Department Store to review their children's outer space exhibit. Trimble (Willard Waterman), a large advertiser in The Sun, wants a good review, despite the display being total fantasy. But Tim can't write the review because he takes one of Martin's sleeping pills. Knowing there's a deadline, Martin writes the review based on what he knows about space. Trimble hates the review and wants Mr. Burns to fire Tim unless Tim apologizes and writes a retraction. Tim decides to apologize, but Martin doesn't want him to compromise his principles. Tim with Martin's help, stands up to Trimble. Trimble's daughter Gloria (Sharon Farrell), who had to set up the exhibit, also stands up to her father about its quality. Trimble admires the courage of Gloria and changes his mind about Tim. (Phil Garris as Delivery Boy).
| 4 | 4 | "Russians 'R' in Season" | Alan Rafkin | James Komack | October 20, 1963 |
Martin reads about a $2 billion American space program and he doesn't believe it can be successful. Tim writes an anonymous letter to the paper because he doesn't want to see the government waste $2 billion. After showing the letter to his boss, Tim writes a newspaper story criticizing the wasted $2 billion. Government agents arrive telling Tim they know he faked the letter. James J. Jackson (Richard Deacon), from the government, wonders why he wrote the letter. One of the agents thinks Tim might be a Russian spy. Tim is hooked up to a lie detector and when asked about Martin, things go bad. The agents bring in Martin and question him under the lie detector, hypnosis, and through brainwashing. He manages to overcome each one. But when they give Martin truth serum, he tells them about being a Martian. After that the agents let Tim and Martin go. They assume Martin is delusional, which caused stress on Tim and that made him write the letter. (Edward Holmes as Agent No. 1. Frank Aletter as Agent No. 2. Bryan O'Byrne as Dr. Weisbord.)
| 5 | 5 | "Man or Amoeba" | Alan Rafkin | Jerry Seelen; Leo Rifkin | October 27, 1963 |
A Professor Newton Jennings (John Fiedler) claims that life on Mars could be no more advanced than amoebas or jellyfish. Tim begins to question whether Martin is really a Martian. Martin helps Angela write a report contradicting what Jennings claimed and it gets her a failing grade. Martin's tries to reason with Angela's teacher, Miss Weaver (Betsy Jones-Moreland), but she says Angela has to rewrite the report. Martin figures the only way to save face is to speak to Jennings and expose him as a fraud. In looking over his notes, Martin finds flaw in Jennings calculation that caused him to come up with his theory. Because of something that Martin gets Tim to say, Jennings corrects the calculation. Jennings gives Tim an interview where he corrects his theory and now says there could be intelligent life on Mars. Angela now gets an A on her report and an apology from Miss Weaver.
| 6 | 6 | "The Man on the Couch" | Sidney Miller | William Blinn; Michael Gleason | November 3, 1963 |
The humidity and heat have become unbearable for Martin. Seeking comfort in cool air, Martin goes atop a water tower. A passerby (Robert Paget) thinks he's a jumper and calls the police. Lt. Harland (Henry Beckman) tries to talk Martin down, but Martin just says he wants to be left alone. Tim is ordered by his editor to get the story of the 'jumper' but his car is in the workshop. Mrs. Brown gives him a lift and they are shocked to find Martin. Tim climbs the tower to talk to him and Martin decides it's time to go home, but is promptly sent to the psychiatric ward to be assessed by Dr. Harvey Bonnett (Frank Behrens). Martin thinks by reading Dr. Bonnett's mind he will be able to tell him what he wants to hear and be discharged. However, Dr. Bonnett's mind is distracted over his own marriage problems, and the patient-doctor rolls become reversed. Martin is eventually released.
| 7 | 7 | "A Loaf of Bread, a Jug of Wine, and Peaches" | Alan Rafkin | Earl Barret | November 10, 1963 |
After Tim tries to describe "love at first sight", Uncle Martin hopes to experience the emotion himself. Martin believes he has fallen for a woman he saw on a park bench. She leaves before Martin can find out anything about her. While walking down the street, he sees a picture of her on a building. Her name is Peaches Ancream (Kathie Browne) and she is an exotic dancer. Tim sets up a dinner date for Peaches and Martin. Peaches and Martin hit it off and he tells Tim he would like to marry her. Peaches admires honesty more than anything else, so Martin decides to tell Peaches the truth about himself. She doesn't believe him. Her last boyfriend, Police Officer Thorp (Noam Pitlik), shows up. They had broken up because he told her 6 different places where he was from. He confesses to her that he doesn't know where he was born as he grew up in an orphanage. Peaches goes back to the man she feels is being more truthful. (Eleanor Berry as the Nurse, Greta Randall as the Model).
| 8 | 8 | "The Awful Truth" | Oscar Rudolph | Arnold Peyser; Lois Peyser | November 17, 1963 |
Tim talks Martin into giving him the power of levitation for a 24 hour period. When Tim realizes that this power really can't help him with his job, he asks Martin to give him the power of mind-reading. Martin grants him his wish, starting the next day and lasting until midnight. Tim uses his power during his lunch date with Daphne and it gets him in trouble. Tim has an interview that afternoon with Councilman Jack Gramby (Alan Reed). He wants to use his power to help him write a story about the Councilman's true political intentions. While reading his mind, Tim is unable to get any definite answers because Gramby hasn't really committed to any certain thing. Tim writes a story about Gramby's indecisiveness. Later that evening Mr. Burns tells Tim that Gramby wants to congratulate the paper. Reading the story made Gramby realize that he as a politician really did need to take a stand. (Dal McKennon as Mailman.)
| 9 | 9 | "Rocket to Mars" | Leslie Goodwins | Austin Kalish; Elroy Schwartz | December 1, 1963 |
Junk men Mike (Tom Kennedy) and Bruno (Karl Lukas) mistakenly empty Martin and Tim's garage instead of Mrs. Brown's, and wind up taking Martin's space ship. Mrs. Brown doesn't know the name of the junk yard. Martin notices that Booboo, a neighborhood dog, was hanging around and may have seen the junk men. Booboo and his dog friends help Martin track down the junk yard. When Martin and Tim get to the junk yard, the Junkyard Manager (Vito Scotti) tells them that the ship has already been sold to a Mr. Carter (Cliff Norton). Turns out Carter is using it as a "rocket" carousel at a children's amusement park. When Martin offers to buy it, Mr. Carter refuses to sell it. Martin decides to disappear and fly the space ship away. He also has Tim slip Carter the money for the ship anonymously. As a thank you, Martin provides a steak dinner for Booboo and all his friends. (Craig Huxley as Boy #2.) Note: Episode was originally scheduled for November 24, 1963. However, the entire season was delayed by one week due to network coverage of the assassination of John F. Kennedy.
| 10 | 10 | "Raffles No. 2" | Oscar Rudolph | Austin Kalish; Elroy Schwartz | December 8, 1963 |
Martin almost gets a parking ticket, so Tim thinks it's time he gets an actual drivers license. At the Department of Motor Vehicles, Martin, who has no finger prints, has to come up with something when he is about to be finger printed. He steals the prints of another man at the DMV. Unfortunately for Martin, the print matches an unidentified print at a major jewel robbery. Martin and Tim notice that the police are watching them. Martin reads the mind of one of them and finds out they suspect he is the jewel thief. Martin sees in the paper that a Mrs. Summer Winthrop (Madge Blake) will be displaying the galaxy diamond necklace at a fundraiser. He thinks the thief will show up and he will recognize him. At the party, Martin recognizes the thief, Brian Henley (Howard Morton). Henley manages to slip the necklace off Mrs. Winthrop. No matter where Henley tries to hide the necklace, Martin levitates it back into his pocket. Henley is quickly apprehended, and Martin and Tim cleared. (Norman Alden as Detective Harris. Olan Soule as Motor Vehicle Clerk. George Cisar as Policeman. John Anderson as Capt. Farrow.)
| 11 | 11 | "The Atom Misers" | Leslie Goodwins | James Menzies | December 15, 1963 |
Martin needs a substance called silibalt to repair his space ship, but it has not yet been invented on Earth. To make some, he needs a cyclotron. Martin tries to build a cyclotron in Tim's kitchen but there isn't enough power. Learning there is a powerful cyclotron at the university, Martin goes with Tim to interview 13-year old physics genius Donald Mumford (Flip Mark). Martin and Donald get together to discuss the making of silibalt. Tim speaks with Dr. Jackson (Jerome Cowan) of the Physics department and Jeanine Carter (Jean Hale), his assistant. Dr. Jackson is against Donald being admitted to the school. Donald and Martin cause an explosion while working on the cyclotron. Dr. Jackson immediately expels Donald and Martin is banished from the university. Martin convinces Dr. Jackson that Donald should be kept at the school. Donald manages to make some silibalt for Martin. Martin's only problem now is that he has no instrument hard enough to cut or mold the silibalt. (Emil Sitka as Workman-1.)
| 12 | 12 | "That Little Old Matchmaker, Martin" | Oscar Rudolph | Terry Ryan | December 22, 1963 |
Tim is crazy about a new co-worker named Cynthia Parker. Martin reads her mind and finds out that Cynthia is passionate about the classical arts. Tim studies up on all the things she would like. Cynthia starts to fall for Tim, and he is starting to feel guilty about deceiving her. Tim can't tell her the truth, so he decides to find her her dream man. Martin reads the minds of the men at the office and finds a perfect match in Bill Fisher (Robert Colbert). The problem is that Bill is seeing Peggy Collins. Martin discovers that Peggy is better suited to Tim and Cynthia to Bill. At a concert that all four are attending, Martin pulls it off so that Bill and Cynthia sit together and Peggy and Tim sit together. Each pair hit it off. A month later, Bill and Cynthia get married. Tim is a bit freaked out when Peggy catches Cynthia's wedding bouquet.
| 13 | 13 | "How to Be a Hero Without Really Trying" | Sidney Miller | Ed James; Seaman Jacobs | December 29, 1963 |
To help in fixing his ship, Martin needs some Glink, an ore located on Earth but not yet discovered by humans. He believes there's some on Sunset Mountain, which is not far away. Tim and Martin meet a little boy named Stevie (future Munsters co-star Butch Patrick), who likes to pretend he's from Mars. They then meet his grown up sister Jennifer Richmond. The Richmonds are new neighbors. Tim invites Stevie and Jennifer on a picnic to Sunset Mountain. Martin goes off looking for Glink and Stevie joins him. Stevie plays a game and climbs up the mountain, but then realizes he can't get down on his own. Martin suggests that Tim be a hero and climb up and get Stevie, but Tim is afraid of heights. Martin tells Tim that he will be safe with the help of Martin's remote control gravitation machine. Tim climbs the mountain, but doesn't know that Martin's machine breaks while he's halfway up. Despite a couple of close calls, Tim and Stevie make it down. Tim faints when he finds out the truth about the gravitation machine. (Richard Reeves as Picnicker. George Cisar as Patrolman #1. Dick Wilson as Patrolman #2.)
| 14 | 14 | "Blood Is Thicker Than the Martian" | Oscar Rudolph | Al Martin; Bill Kelsay | January 5, 1964 |
Tim's cousin Harvey (Paul Smith) is coming for a visit. The problem is that Harvey would know that Tim has no Uncle Martin. Plus, Tim remembers that Harvey is the biggest mooch in the world. After he arrives, Harvey tells Tim that he wants Tim's help getting a job at The Sun. Making sure Harvey doesn't see Martin becomes a problem. Tim's boss agrees to give Harvey a job. Harvey mentions the high stress of this new job to Tim. After several days, Martin comes up with an idea. He poses as an old newspaper buddy of Tim's looking for a job at a small town paper. Martin talks about the stress of a job at a big town paper and how it caused him to sees things. Martin starts moving things with his levitation finger, causing Harvey to think he's stressed out from his new job. Harvey decides to return home to his old job.
| 15 | 15 | "Poor Little Rich Cat" | James Komack | James Komack | January 12, 1964 |
Martin reads in the paper where a Rosemary Willis left her cat, Max, $650,000 in her will. Morton Beanbecker (Bernie Kopell), the lawyer for the estate, tells Tim there were actually two wills. The second will gave the money to a children's orphanage, but it was either never signed or hidden. Martin reads Morton's mind and finds he really wants the second will to be found. Tim and Martin speak with Max's trustees who are Rosemary's sister, Aggie (Moyna Macgill), and her husband, Charles (Dub Taylor). Aggie and Charles are spending money on Max and themselves. Max the cat tells Martin that he is miserable with all the money, and it was he who hid the second will because Rosemary did forget to sign it. Max leads Martin to the will. Beanbecker and Martin come up with a plan to overturn the first will. They decide to hold a séance. Martin, pretending to be Rosemary, tells Aggie that she wants the money turned over to the orphanage. Aggie agrees to follow her older sisters wishes.
| 16 | 16 | "Rx for Martin" | James Komack | James Komack | January 19, 1964 |
Mars in unusually close-to-Earth orbit means Martin can fly even his wounded spaceship home. He has a 10 hour window of opportunity. Just as he is about to leave, he slips down the stairs and sprains his ankle, and also sprains his disappearing antenna. Mrs. Brown immediately calls for an ambulance. When the ambulance doctor takes Martin's vital signs, he realizes something is not quite right. At the hospital, Doctor Rothman (Bill Zuckert) tells Martin that he will give him a complete physical. Martin knows that to get out of the hospital, he needs to have normal human vital signs. With Tim's help, Martin passes the exam. But the doctor now wants a fluoroscope of Martin. Tim manages to take the fluoroscope for Martin. Martin regains the use of his disappearing antenna and manages to escape from the hospital. With one hour to spare, Martin gets ready to leave again. Martin slips down the stairs and sprains his other ankle. He now misses his opportunity to get home to Mars. (Yale Summers as Intern.)
| 17 | 17 | "Going, Going, Gone" | Oscar Rudolph | Austin Kalish; Elroy Schwartz | February 2, 1964 |
Something is wreaking havoc with Martin's metabolism and powers. He loses control of his levitation finger. His clothes become magnetized. He uncontrollably levitates and then later becomes electrically charged. He shrinks and then he disappears. Martin learns that the cause of his problems are an increased activity of sunspots. After several days, Martin is still invisible. Mrs. Brown had recently sold Martin an insurance policy with Tim as beneficiary. The police now believe Martin's disappearance is due to Tim killing him for the insurance money. Not wanting Tim to go to jail, Martin decides to tell the police about his Martian identity. But before he can, the sunspots stop and Martin reappears, just in time to save Tim. (Henry Beckman as Ass't D.A. Ronald Bradley. Jonathan Hole as William Stone.)
| 18 | 18 | "Who Am I?" | Leslie Goodwins | Ben Starr | February 9, 1964 |
Martin reads that Professor Downey, the foremost expert on rocket fuel, is in town. He wants Tim to interview the Professor so Martin can look at the Professors notes. Martin believes that can help him get back to Mars. Martin is hit on the head with a monkey wrench and gets amnesia. He now has no idea that he's a Martian. Tim takes Martin to see a doctor. After speaking to both Martin and Tim, Dr. Gilbert isn't sure which one really needs to be examined. While there, Martin learns that he has the power of levitation. Martin performs some levitation in front of Dr. Gilbert, but Tim says it's just magic. Back at the apartment, Martin is once again struck on the head and he regains his memory. Unfortunately, Professor Downey has already left town for good.
| 19 | 19 | "Now You See It, Now You Don't" | Leslie Goodwins | Ben Gershman; Bill Freedman | February 16, 1964 |
Martin learns that long-time museum curator Wilbur Canfield (Cecil Kellaway) is questioning his own abilities. It seems he has just bought an expensive Egyptian piece for the museum, but the museum's board is questioning its authenticity. The board is bringing in an expert, Pietro Donati (Maurice Marsac). If Martin can get a look at the piece, he will know if the piece is authentic. That way, Tim can get an exclusive story and Martin can validate Canfield as an expert. Martin finds a way to levitate the piece to him. He authenticates the piece and then manages to get it back into the museum. Donati arrives and says the piece is a fake since the mark of Ra is not there. Martin tells him to look a little more closely under the couple thousand years of residue. Donati clears off some residue and finds the mark of Ra. Tim gets his exclusive story, but it was so good, Mr. Burns appoints him special culture editor, which Tim is not thrilled about. (John Qualen as Matt the Guard. Harry Lauter as John the Guard.)
| 20 | 20 | "My Nephew the Artist" | Oscar Rudolph | Ben Starr | February 23, 1964 |
Martin feels bad that he can't contribute to the household financially. He decides to sell some paintings he has done. Mr. Green (Cyril Delavanti) of the Green Gallery thinks Martin's first piece is just like a Van Gogh. Mr. Green asks Martin to paint some more, and they sell as quickly as Martin can get them to the gallery. When the gallery wants to have a showing of Martin's work, Tim thinks it may raise questions about Martin himself. Martin tells Mr. Green that Tim actually did all the paintings. At the show, art expert Mr. Bentley (Richard Deacon) doubts that Tim is the artist, and challenges Tim to execute paintings in the styles of Rembrandt, Lautrec, Picasso, Gauguin, and van Gogh. At the demonstration, Martin has an allergic reaction which affects him helping Tim. Martin discovers the source is a corsage worn by Mrs. Bentley (Cathleen Cordell). After Martin gets rid of the corsage, Tim, with Martin's help, proceeds with the painting demonstration. Mr. Bentley now claims Tim a major art talent. Martin finds a way to get Tim out of an art career. (Hazel Shermet as Bargaining Woman.)
| 21 | 21 | "Hitchhike to Mars" | Oscar Rudolph | Bill Freedman; Ben Gershman | March 1, 1964 |
Reading that the Inter-Galaxy Corporation is launching a rocket to either Mars or Venus, Martin hopes to stowaway on it to return home. Inter-Galaxy's President J.M. Buckley (Herbert Rudley), a very superstitious man, is about to announce that the rocket will be sent to Mars until he realizes that it's Friday the 13th. Martin convinces Buckley that Friday the 13th is actually a very lucky day. But Buckley delays the announcement again when he realizes that he has lost his lucky rabbit's foot. Martin recreates the rabbit's foot and Buckley finds it. Buckley makes the announcement that the rocket will launch to Mars in two days. To thank the corporation, Martin suggests adding a magnetic oscilloscope to the rocket. But this backfires because, by adding the oscilloscope, there is no more room in the rocket for a stowaway. (Alice Backes as Miss Maxwell. Vito Scotti as Waiter.) In this episode, Tim refers to Martin as "my favorite Martian."
| 22 | 22 | "Uncle Martin's Broadcast" | Oscar Rudolph | James Komack | March 8, 1964 |
Tim discovers that Martin's antennae can pick up radio and television signals and other things. While Martin's asleep, Tim tunes him into a police frequency hoping for a newspaper scoop. He hears about a robbery, and calls the police the next day to find out more information. The police pick up both Tim and Martin, because Tim knew just a little too much about the robbery. Sgt. Seeley (Don Haggerty) thinks Tim is committing crimes so that he can get stories for the newspaper. Because Martin can't be fingerprinted, he decides to break out of jail, leaving Tim behind. Martin goes to the scene of the crime to see if he can find any clues. He finds clues that lead him to Jim (Paul Sorensen) and Harry (Lane Bradford) at a waterfront bar. Martin reads their minds and finds out that Seeley is involved. Martin returns to the police station and makes a confession which is exactly what Seeley is thinking. Seeley then confesses and says he wanted to boost his career. (Dick Wilson as Charlie.)
| 23 | 23 | "An Old, Old Friend of the Family" | Leslie Goodwins | John L. Greene | March 15, 1964 |
Martin makes Tim miss a deadline and Tim is not happy about it. Tim was to write a story about Jakobar (Charles Maxwell), the rogue leader of the country of Kobima, who is in town. Martin happened to know Jakobar's great-grandfather Kobima, for who the country was named. Martin thinks he'll be able to get Tim an exclusive interview. After Martin displays the sign of Cocobahn, which was Martin's name in Kobima, Jakobar agrees to see him. Jakobar is suspicious, but Martin talks him into speaking with Tim. But when Tim arrives, suspicion gets the better of Jakobar, and he refuses to talk to Tim. After speaking about Kobima and being a better leader, Martin once again gets Jakobar to agree to see Tim. This time, because Jakobar begins to trust Martin, Tim gets his interview. (Henry Corden as East Indian. Joseph V. Perry as Guard #2.)
| 24 | 24 | "Super-Duper Snooper" | Leslie Goodwins | Al Martin; Bill Kelsay | March 22, 1964 |
Martin learns that Mrs. Brown is taking a correspondence course on how to be a private detective. Her first assignment is to prepare a report on an unsuspecting person and her choice is Martin. Mrs. Brown finds Martin's flight log, which is written in Martian, and takes some pictures of it. Martin discovers what she's done and is worried that she will send the film to someone to decipher. He then learns that she mailed the film to the president of the correspondence school, J. Nathaniel Pierce (Cliff Norton). Martin goes to the school to intercept the film. At the office, Martin searches for the film but can't find it. He then has to listen to a sales pitch from Pierce. The mailman comes by and asks Pierce if he will pay the postage on Mrs. Brown's film since she forgot to do so. After Pierce says to send it back, Martin levitates the film and leaves with it. Martin tries to tell Mrs. Brown that being a private detective can be very dangerous. But, instead of quitting the course, she decides to protect herself by taking judo lessons.
| 25 | 25 | "The Sinkable Mrs. Brown" | Oscar Rudolph | Al Martin; Bill Kelsay | April 5, 1964 |
Pete Dudley (Allan Melvin), a shifty real estate man, tells Mrs. Brown that her house is run down and she should sell it. Tim and Martin are worried because of the hidden spaceship. They try to talk Mrs. Brown out of selling. Dudley already has prospective buyers, Edgar (George Dunn) and Emily (Elvia Allman) Graham. Edgar is interested in the garage as he wants to make it into a workshop. When Dudley and the Graham's make a surprise visit, Martin is able to hide the spaceship long enough. Mrs. Brown has second thoughts about selling but she has already signed a contract. Martin comes up with a plan. With a couple of tricks, he gets the Grahams to see that the house has far too many problems. Dudley loses the sale and Mrs. Brown gets to keep her house.
| 26 | 26 | "Martin and the Eternal Triangle" | Oscar Rudolph | Ben Gershman; Bill Freedman | April 12, 1964 |
Martin wants to take Tim to the Philharmonic, but Tim has plans. Tim suggests Martin take Mrs. Brown. Turns out she also has a date for that evening with Andre Philippe Charles Dupre (Albert Carrier), a suave, debonair fashion designer. After meeting Andre, Martin is actually a little jealous. Tim tells Martin to see if he can find any flaw in Andre to be able to discredit him with. When Martin finds nothing, he feels ashamed about his selfishness. He decides to help further Mrs. Brown's relationship with Andre. But, Martin reads her mind and learns that she doesn't find Andre to be as romantic as she had hoped. Martin still makes their next date the best it could be. Andre proposes, but Mrs. Brown turns him down and decides not to see him again. She felt the evening was too perfect and she would prefer a man with a few imperfections, someone like Martin. (Dovima appears as Model.)
| 27 | 27 | "Danger! High Voltage!" | Leslie Goodwins | Ben Gershman; Bill Freedman | April 19, 1964 |
Martin has his space ship working again. He needs to electrically charge himself to send a message back to Mars. But he overcharges himself and damages the ship again. When Martin tries to discharge the excess electricity, he blacks out half of Los Angeles. And his sneezing causes electrical switches to turn on. The power company is looking for the source of the blackout and have called in the police to investigate. Martin decides the best way to discharge the electricity in a hurry is to do it at the source: the power station. Martin turns invisible and hides in the power truck that's come to investigate their neighborhood. After distracting Homer P. Gibson (Henry Gibson), the power man on duty, Martin manages to discharge his electricity safely back into the system. (Milton Frome as Mr. Logan.)
| 28 | 28 | "If You Can't Lick Them" | Oscar Rudolph | Blanche Hanalis | April 26, 1964 |
Martin can't work on his spaceship because neighborhood boy, Horace, won't leave him alone. Martin is so stressed that his antennae get stuck in the up position and he loses some of his powers. Knowing that Horace is on the way, Martin makes a pair of antennae for Tim to wear. Now Horace also wants to play Martian and goes out to try to buy a pair of antennae. All the boys in town are now wearing antennae. A magazine wants to interview Martin and he doesn't want the publicity. With a simple hiccup, Martin's stuck antennae and powers are fixed. Mr. Barnaby (Hal Smith), the person who manufactured Horace's antennae, tells Martin that he wants to patent the toy. To solve their problem, Martin decides to create a new fad to replace the antennae craze.
| 29 | 29 | "Unidentified Flying Uncle Martin" | Leslie Goodwins | James Komack | May 3, 1964 |
Martin needs to fly his space ship because inactivity is not good for it. Martin's ship is seen in the sky by multiple people, including Mrs. Brown. Mrs. Brown has called in the authorities and Jim (Don Keefer) and Jack (James Callahan) show up. They want to use Tim's apartment as a sighting station. Jim and Jack brought with them a plutron counter that can sense Martin's ship. Despite this, Martin needs to make a second flight. To cause a distraction, Martin slips some plutron into Mrs. Brown's apron pocket and the machine points in her direction and Tim then causes another distraction. Martin makes his flight undetected and gets back to the apartment safe and sound.
| 30 | 30 | "How Are You Gonna Keep Them Down on the Pharmacy?" | Leslie Goodwins | James Komack | May 10, 1964 |
Being on Earth has caused Martin to develop a vitamin deficiency and he is losing energy. If someone looks him in the eyes, they fall asleep since they are sapped of their energy by Martin. Martin needs some vitamins immediately or he will grow weaker and weaker. But it's Sunday and all the stores are closed. Tim gets his friend, Doc Mullen (Herbie Faye), to open his pharmacy. Martin gets the vitamins he needs and is about to start taking them. But now when Tim looks at Mrs. Brown, Doc Mullen and Martin, they all fall asleep. Martin figures out that when he is cured, Tim will be cured. After quite a bit of maneuvering, Martin gets the vitamins he needs, but he takes too much. He becomes over-energized and this in turn causes everyone else around him to feel over-energized. Fortunately, there is a simple cure for that.
| 31 | 31 | "Miss Jekyll and Hyde" | Oscar Rudolph | Al Martin; Bill Kelsay | May 17, 1964 |
Mrs. Brown's niece Paula Clayfield (Marlo Thomas), a former child prodigy, comes for visit. Paula notices Martin's sketches for a space ship and tells him there are several flaws in the design. The next day, Paula comes by with an idea how to help with the design and notices a piece of a Martian alloy that she cannot identify. Martin is concerned about Paula finding out his Martian identity. Despite her Plain Jane looks, Martin wants Tim to ask her out and keep her occupied. Martin learns that Paula and a Dr. Edgar Edgarton (Tom Skerritt) have an understanding, but he is away. To get Tim to ask Paula out again, Martin transforms Paula into a ravishing beauty without her knowledge. Tim takes her out and asks her to marry him. Martin turns Paula plain again and convinces her that she can make herself beautiful. Edgar comes for a visit, and notices the transformation in her appearance. Paula has accidentally taken Martin's alloy, which she and Edgar are going to get tested. In the end, Martin gets his alloy back and Edgar and Paula get married.
| 32 | 32 | "Who's Got the Power?" | Leslie Goodwins | James Komack | May 24, 1964 |
An electrical storm causes Martin to develop popsy, which makes him appear and disappear uncontrollably. Martin needs to long ground himself electrically to cure the popsy. Mrs. Brown drops by and accidentally becomes part of the grounding. She now has Martin's levitation power. Martin temporarily cures the popsy with a mixture of household cleaners. With a lot of maneuvering and wiring, Martin manages to transfer the levitation power back to himself from Mrs. Brown. Martin tries the grounding procedure again and the popsy is finally cured.
| 33 | 33 | "Oh, My Aching Antenna" | Oscar Rudolph | Ted Sherdeman; Jane Klove | May 31, 1964 |
Martin finds that he is prematurely aging due to the increased gravity on Earth compared to Mars. He thinks he has found a way to de-gravitize himself. Martin creates some wristbands from parts of his space ship to help in his therapy. But when he turns them on, it causes havoc for those around him and for some reason it affects Mrs. Brown's garden. There's a giant vine coming through Martin's window and it appears to be coming after him. Martin makes some adjustments which at first seem to help. However, now the corn in Mrs. Brown's garden grows at an incredible pace. Before Mrs. Brown's gardener Ezel (Jay Sheffield) can ask too many questions, Martin finds a way to explain how the corn grew so fast. But Martin still needs a few more therapy sessions to cure himself.
| 34 | 34 | "The Disastro-nauts" | Leslie Goodwins | Ben Gershman; Bill Freedman | June 7, 1964 |
Omar M. Keck (Alan Hale Jr.), the sausage tycoon, is privately financing a rocket trip destined for Mars. Tim hopes to use his connections as a reporter to get Martin a tryout for the astronaut position. Despite the other applicants being younger, Martin's Martian abilities get him the job. Martin allows Tim to write a story about his uncle being an actual Martian that can be published after Martin has taken off. While taking Martin to the launch pad, Tim leaves a tape of Martin's story on Mr. Burns' desk. When the launch of the rocket is delayed, Tim and Martin have to rush back to Burns' office to get the tape before he does. After they destroy the tape, Tim and Martin rush back to base only to see the rocket take off without Martin in it. (Buck Taylor as Bruce Baker. Frank De Vol as Prof. Crenshaw.)
| 35 | 35 | "Shake Well and Don't Use" | Oscar Rudolph | Al Martin; Bill Kelsay | June 14, 1964 |
Tim and Mr. Burns' nephew, Freddie Carson (Kip King), are up for the same promotion at the newspaper. Martin learns that Mr. Burns is a gourmet and decides to invite him for a meal, which will include some special Martian condiments. That should earn Tim some extra points toward the promotion. Mr. Burns has a reaction to the meal, starts to move in slow motion, and then freezes still. Martin's antidote causes Mr.Burns to speed up and then freeze still. Meanwhile, Freddie arrives to take his uncle to the airport to meet the newspapers publisher. Tim and Martin hide Mr. Burns in the bedroom and Martin works on figuring out the correct antidote. Thinking that his uncle had stepped out for a moment, Freddie lets slip about the newspaper and a possible merger. He also has some unfaltering things to say about his uncle. Martin finds a simple cure, Mr. Burns overhears what Freddie said, and Tim gets the promotion.
| 36 | 36 | "A Nose for News" | Alan Rafkin | William Blinn; Michael Gleason | June 21, 1964 |
Tim gets mad at Martin because he believes that Martin ruined his date with Linda (Maggie Pierce). The next day, Tim sneaks out of the office to buy Linda a gift. Mr. Burns calls the apartment looking for Tim because he wants Tim to do a story on Ambassador Lloyd Thomas (David White). Martin goes on the story in Tim's place, reads Lloyd's mind and phones back to Mr. Burns with an exclusive using Tim's voice. Mr. Burns then sees Tim in the office while he is also talking to him on the phone. Tim confesses that it is Martin on the phone and Mr. Burns now wants to hire Martin. Mr. Burns learns that Lloyd is going to sue the paper for invasion of privacy because of the story. It also turns out that Burns and Lloyd know each other and do not get along. Martin finds a way to get Harry Burns and Lloyd Thomas to be friends again. (Sheila Bromley as Mrs. Thomas.)
| 37 | 37 | "Uncle Martin's Wisdom Tooth" | Oscar Rudolph | James Komack | June 28, 1964 |
A toothache of his "eye" tooth is causing vision problems for Martin. Tim thinks Martin should go to an oculist, but Martin wants to go to a dentist. Not having typical human teeth, Martin wants Tim to take his place at the dentists office. Martin just needs to get into the office to get some dental powders and pumice. They go to see Dr. Herbie Little (Lennie Weinrib). Martin manages to get what he wants and they leave. But the remedy causes Martin's eye teeth to go crossed eyed, as does his vision. The only thing left to do is remove the tooth. At Dr. Little's office, Martin removes his own tooth with neither the Doctor nor Nurse Norma (Francine York) remembering what happened.

=== Season 2 (1964–65) ===
All episodes in black-and-white

| No. overall | No. in season | Title | Directed by | Written by | Original release date |
|---|---|---|---|---|---|
| 38 | 1 | "Dreaming Can Make It So" | Oscar Rudolph | Ben Gershman; Bill Freedman | September 27, 1964 |
Martin dreams in 2D, which means in form but not in substance. Without Martin knowing it, Mrs. Brown gives him some low-fat brownies. This changes Martin's constitution because polyunsaturates affect Martians. His dreams change from being 2D to 3D, they also don't go away and they grow larger in size. Among other things, Martin dreams up a piece of Martian seismonitricite, a powerful explosive. Martin finds out that the brownies were low-fat. He consumes a large amount of poly-saturates and all the things that he dreamed up, including the explosive, vanish.
| 39 | 2 | "The Memory Pill" | Oscar Rudolph | Benedict Freedman | October 4, 1964 |
When Tim complains that he can't seem to remember certain things, Martin tells him how overly cluttered his mind is. Martin says that Tim can store unneeded memories in an electronic memory box. The box will make a pill that will bring the memory back. While Martin is out, Tim uses the box and accidentally stores all memories of Martin away. Martin tries to tell Tim that he is a Martian that Tim befriended. A frightened Tim tells Mrs. Brown that Martin is a Martian and she thinks that Tim is sick. Mrs. Brown calls Dr. Nichols (David White) to examine Tim. The doctor shows up and things get very confusing. Memory pills and tranquilizers get mixed up and Dr. Nichols and Mrs. Brown swallows the wrong pills. This now gives them some Martian memories. While Martin tries to correct things, the machine blows up and returns everyone back to normal.
| 40 | 3 | "Three to Make Ready" | Leslie Goodwins | Bruce Howard; Bud Nye | October 11, 1964 |
Martin reads about an unmanned rocket that is going to Mars. He can't decide whether to go home or stay on Earth with Tim. Martin creates a neuro cerebral stimulator to help him make up his mind. A lightning strike causes Martin to split into three: two decisive Martins and one indecisive Martin. If the three Martins can come to a decision about the rocket flight, they will rejoin. Tim tries to hide two of the Martins from Mrs. Brown and her doctor. Tim has to drive the three Martins to the base, so he hides them in a trunk and some bags. The doctor sees Tim loading them into his car and calls the police. Agreeing that they didn't want Tim to get into trouble, the three Martins join together before the police find the three bodies. Unfortunately, Martin misses the rocket launch. (Sheldon Allman as Patrolman Culbreth.)
| 41 | 4 | "Nothing but the Truth" | Oscar Rudolph | Blanche Hanalis | October 18, 1964 |
Martin has hidden his spaceship away from the house. Mrs. Browns' sister Dulcy, her husband Henry (Don Keefer) and their son Stanley come for a visit. Henry doesn't let Stanley believe in anything that doesn't have a logical and scientific explanation. That night, Stanley sees Martin putting the spaceship back in the garage. He runs to tell his father, who punishes him for telling lies. Martin feels bad and wants to find a way to help Stanley. Using his spaceship, Martin gets Henry to understand that imagination can seem real and make believe can be fun. (Stafford Repp as Police Sergeant.)
| 42 | 5 | "Dial M for Martin" | Oscar Rudolph | Fred S. Fox; Iz Elinson | October 25, 1964 |
Tim accidentally cuts a live telephone wire while fixing Mrs. Brown's TV antenna. The wire hits Martin and turns him into a live telephone. Meanwhile, Mrs. Brown has called the police to help her locate her missing pocketbook and Det. Brennan is sent over. Martin reads Mrs. Brown's mind and learns that she merely misplaced her pocketbook and he locates it in her house. Det. Brennan is still a little suspicious of Martin and Tim. Martin continues to try to figure out how to disconnect himself back to normal. Martin and Tim overhear on Martin's telephone a plot to steal the Vandeleer diamond. Martin finds a way for Det. Brennan to capture the crooks. He also figures out how to turn off the telephone inside him. (Edward Colmans as Mr. Blackstone.) Alan Hewitt joins the cast as Detective Bill Brennan.
| 43 | 6 | "Extra! Extra! Sensory Perception!" | Leslie Goodwins | James Komack | November 1, 1964 |
Tim is working on some articles on the study of extra-sensory perception. He is to meet with Professor Hammerschlag (Leonid Kinskey), an authority on ESP. Martin asks Tim to not bring him to the apartment as the professor might uncover Martin's true identity. Unfortunately, Tim had no choice but to bring Hammerschlag to the apartment. Martin temporarily hides his sensory perception in a house plant so the professor can't perceive his thoughts. While looking at the plant, Mrs. Brown gets Martin's sensory perception. In a human this causes regression all the way back to babyhood. Because Mrs. Brown inhaled Martin's sensory perception, she must sneeze it out of her body. Martin finds a way to get his sensory perception back and to have Hammerschlag not remember anything he saw.
| 44 | 7 | "My Uncle the Folk Singer" | Oscar Rudolph | Lee Karson | November 8, 1964 |
Martin has been recording Earth music for a couple hundred years with his mind. Tim's latest girlfriend, Della Darwell (Pat Priest), owns a coffee house. At the coffee house, Martin has a reaction to a cappuccino containing cinnamon. It turns on his recorder playback, and out comes a folk song that Martin pretends to sing. The song is a hit with the club patrons. Della asks Tim to try to persuade Martin to sing at the club to help the business. Martin agrees to help Della out. It doesn't take long for his popularity to go to Martin's head. To bring him back to his senses, Tim breaks Martin's playback function with a large dose of cinnamon. Martin finds a way to perform one last show, but it doesn't have the desired effect that Martin intended. (Stanley Ralph Ross as Folk Singer.)
| 45 | 8 | "The Great Brain Robbery" | Oscar Rudolph | Rik Vollaerts | November 15, 1964 |
In an effort to help Tim financially, Martin decides to do some tutoring. Martin informs Tim that Martians are rendered brain dysfunctional when exposed to pure silver. Martin's first student is belligerent 12-year old Eddie Prescott, the son of Air Force Captain Edward Prescott (Frank Marth). Edward wants his son to enter into the prestigious air force academy. Martin finds out that Eddie puts on an act because he feels he's not smart enough to learn. During Martin and Eddie's first lesson, disaster strikes because of Eddie's silver braces, which Martin doesn't know he has. Eddie begins to learn, Martin begins to forget, because Eddie is robbing Martin's brains. Martin finally finds out about Eddie's braces. Another problem arises when Martin learns that Eddie and his family are moving to Washington DC that night. Martin finds a way to get his brains back and leave Eddie with a thirst for knowledge.
| 46 | 9 | "Double Trouble" | Leslie Goodwins | Ben Gershman; Bill Freedman | November 22, 1964 |
Martin creates a duplicating machine. But the lifespan of the duplicates is limited. Tim accidentally leaves the machine on and it duplicates Mrs. Brown right before her date with Det. Brennan. Det. Brennan winds up taking out the duplicate. Martin realizes that they have less than an hour before the duplicate fades away. Martin and Tim decide to bring the real Mrs. Brown to the restaurant and somehow switch her with the duplicate. The two Mrs. Brown's running around the restaurant causes a lot of confusion and near misses. Martin comes up with a plan but things go wrong when he accidentally duplicates Det. Brennan. Martin is able to distract the real Mrs. Brown and Det. Brennan while the duplicates disappear. (Mel Prestidge as Maitre d'. Irene Tsu as Leilani.)
| 47 | 10 | "Has Anyone Seen My Electro-Magnetic Neutron Converting Gravitron?" | Leslie Goodwins | Albert E. Lewin; Burt Styler | November 29, 1964 |
Martin and Tim are in the woods with the spaceship preparing for a test flight. Six-year old runaway Peter Pendleton comes across the spaceship while Martin and Tim are going back to the car to get a flight plan. Peter actually manages to take a flight on the ship. After landing, Peter gets away and Martin and Tim figure out there was a little boy flying the ship. Peter tells a policeman and his Aunt Lily (June Dayton) about the spaceship and they pretend to believe him. Reporter Grinnel (Herb Ellis) writes an article about Peter's story. Grinnel becomes suspicious when he also hears that the Air Force reported a UFO that same night. Martin discovers that Peter has taken his Electro-Magnetic Neutron Converting Gravitron from the ship. Martin comes up with a plan to get it back before nosy reporter Grinnell gets the truth and the device from Peter.
| 48 | 11 | "Don't Rain on My Parade" | Leslie Goodwins | James Komack | December 6, 1964 |
During a dry spell, Mr. Baldetti, Mrs. Brown's neighbor, claims he can make it rain like he did in the old country. He brings a rain making machine out of his garage. While using the machine, Baldetti blasts Martin with a puff of "smog" which makes Martin tear up. Martin accidentally blasts a hole in a cloud with his levitating finger which causes it to rain. While Martin tries to figure out how to repair the cloud, it rains for 7 days and 7 nights. Baldetti, feeling bad because he thinks he caused the rain, says he wishes he were a plumber that could shut of the rain. This gives Martin an idea and he stops the rain.
| 49 | 12 | "Night Life of Uncle Martin" | Oscar Rudolph | Albert E. Lewin; Burt Styler | December 13, 1964 |
When a Martian is fatigued and overworked, they create a double of themselves as a defense mechanism. Martin has been working on a project for two days without sleep. When he finally does go to sleep, his double materializes. Martin's double is his "play" half and he goes out on the town. Tim is on a date and he sees Martin's double, who is a womanizer named Pierre. Martin finds out that Pierre is engaged to a woman named Flossie (Joyce Jameson). Martin figures out a way to have Flossie lose interest in Pierre. (Hal Baylor as Harold. Dick Wilson as Davey. Clarence Lung as Maitre D'.)
| 50 | 13 | "To Make a Rabbit Stew, First Catch a Martian" | Leslie Goodwins | Al Martin; Bill Kelsay | December 20, 1964 |
Pammie Goodwin's pet rabbit, Cleo, accidentally swallows one of Martin's vitamins. It causes Cleo to grow into a 6-foot tall rabbit with a 6-foot tall rabbit appetite. While Martin tries to figure out how to restore Cleo, they have to hide her from Pammie, Mrs. Brown and Det. Brennan. Before Martin can give Cleo the antidote he whipped up, Cleo makes her way into Mrs. Brown's masquerade party. Despite a suspicious Det. Brennan constantly around, Martin manages to secretly slip Cleo the antidote just in time. (Ollie O'Toole as Man with Dog.)
| 51 | 14 | "Won't You Come Home, Uncle Martin, Won't You Come Home?" | Leslie Goodwins | S : Marty Roth; T : Bill Kelsey, Al Martin | December 27, 1964 |
Martin finds out that Det. Brennan is trying to find out about his background. Hoping to get Brennan off his trail, Martin uses a benevolence light bulb that when shone on Martians, permeates them with a "like me" glow. Brennan shows up and instantly wants to be Martin's best friend. Tim gets in front of the bulb and when he sees Mrs. Brown, she slaps him. Martin tells Tim that the bulb has the exact opposite effect on humans, it permeates them with a "hate me" glow. Martin needs to find some fluorencium to counteract the bulb's effect on Tim. Tim has an important interview with Mr. Phelps (J. Edward McKinley) that he tries to postpone. Tim is on the verge of losing his apartment, his girlfriend and his job, when Martin returns with the fluorencium.
| 52 | 15 | "The Case of the Missing Sleuth" | Oscar Rudolph | Bill Freedman; Ben Gershman | January 3, 1965 |
Martin creates an Ultrasonic Microcosmic Molecular Separator. It's a device that breaks down objects to their individual molecules. Because the molecules are so small, the object becomes invisible to the naked eye. By reversing the machine, it can put the molecules back together. Det. Brennan comes by and accidentally zaps himself with the Separator. Not knowing what she is doing, Mrs. Brown vacuums up his molecules and they get thrown in the trash. Fortunately, Martin retrieves all the molecules, but then loses some. The police send Det. Collins (Michael Constantine) to investigate Brennan's disappearance. A suspicious Collins complicates getting Brennan back together. But before Collins takes Martin and Tim in for questioning, Martin manages to bring Brennan back.
| 53 | 16 | "How Are Things in Glocca Martin?" | Byron Paul | Albert E. Lewin, Burt Styler | January 10, 1965 |
Tim's rich Grand Uncle Seamus (Sean McClory) comes for a surprise visit. Seamus sees Martin doing some of his Martian trickery, and believes that Martin is a leprechaun. Seamus would like Martin to find his one true love, Eileen McGinty (Virginia Gregg), who he hasn't seen in 25 years. Martin finds Eileen, a plain housemaid, and transforms her into a refined woman. She confesses that she didn't lose Seamus to another woman, but to his love of money. She's afraid he won't love her because she is poor. Before they are about to meet, Martin makes Seamus appear to be a poor slob. Seamus now thinks she's rich, and she thinks he's poor. When the truth comes out, their old differences crop up again. Martin finds away to bring them together.
| 54 | 17 | "Gesundheit, Uncle Martin" | Oscar Rudolph | Ben Gershman; Bill Freedman | January 17, 1965 |
Martin's sneezing is affecting his short-term memory. Martin realizes that it's the first day of sneezaphobia week, which occurs every 300 years. There is a simple remedy, but because of a sneeze, Martin can't remember the last key ingredient. Not wanting prying Det. Brennan to find anything, Tim recommends that Martin hide his spaceship and his Martian belongings. Tim reminds Martin to write down where he hides it in case he sneezes and forgets. Unfortunately he writes it in a book that Tim lends to Mrs. Brown to give to Det. Brennan. Martin manages to get the book back, but can't remember how to read his Martian notes. Just in time, Martin remembers the last ingredient for the remedy.
| 55 | 18 | "Martian Report No. 1" | Oscar Rudolph | Blanche Hanalis | January 31, 1965 |
Martin thinks that Earth children should be deep-frozen until adulthood. This would spare them the unhappiness of being relatively unproductive. Tim suggests that Martin have a little more personal contact with children to see what they're like. Martin goes to an orphanage that has an out-child program for the weekend. Despite being a problem child, Martin brings home Doris. They wind up having a lot of fun together. Doris finds Martin's report on her and realizes that she is just an experiment to him. Doris runs away. After Martin finds her, he admits that he was wrong about the sadness and non-productivity of children. He also says he was wrong to use Doris as an experiment and adults should sometimes act like a child. (Olan Soule as Investigator.)
| 56 | 19 | "Uncle Martin and the Identified Flying Object" | Byron Paul | Marty Roth; Lissa Charrel | February 7, 1965 |
Martin's levitation finger is malfunctioning due to overexposure to the sun. A Martian sedative will temporarily control the finger. But before Martin takes the sedative, his finger causes some flying objects in Mrs. Brown's apartment. Because of a phone call Mrs. Brown made, Prof. Clemmens (Vaughn Taylor), a psychic phenomenon expert, is coming to inspect her house. If Martin can't find a permanent fix for his finger, it will cause a major catastrophe due to the build up of energy. Prof. Clemmens would like to look inside the garage, but Martin finds a way to stall him. Martin accidentally stumbles onto the permanent fix for his finger. Martin then comes up with a way to provide the professor with a scientific explanation for the weird goings-on.
| 57 | 20 | "A Martian Fiddles Around" | Oscar Rudolph | Albert E. Lewin; Burt Styler | February 14, 1965 |
Mrs. Brown is playing a bad violin and it is causing Martin to short circuit and become transparent. Martin waves his finger and breaks the strings on the violin. He tells Mrs. Brown that he can fix it. Martin takes apart the violin, fixes a few fundamental flaws and the violin sounds beautiful. The violin maker is Mrs. Brown's teacher, Signor Almafi (Ernest Sarracino). His family violin business is in threat of going under due to the poor quality of the instruments. After hearing the new and improved instrument, Amalfi figures he did something right, he just doesn't know what. Martin finds a way to pass on his violin making knowledge to Amalfi without Amalfi knowing the true source. (Michael Pataki as Johnny Amalfi.)
| 58 | 21 | "Humbug, Mrs. Brown" | Oscar Rudolph | Al Martin; Bill Kelsay | February 21, 1965 |
Martin finds out that Mrs. Brown is in a bad financial situation due to her overly generous nature. Using noodle soup, Martin gives her some subliminal messages to save money. But his plan backfires when Mrs. Brown becomes overly frugal. As she no longer trusts banks, she withdraws all her money and keeps it at home. Martin and Tim learn that Hank the cat-burglar (Len Lesser) in the neighborhood. Mrs. Brown kicks Tim and Martin out of the apartment for being late with their rent. Hank does try to steal Mrs. Brown's money, but while stopping him, Martin and Tim end up with the money. Martin disappears and Tim is charged with the theft. Martin finds a way to have Hank and Mrs. Brown brought to the police station. With the help of some more noodle soup subliminal messages, Martin gets Hank to confess and brings Mrs. Brown back to normal. (Harry Lauter as Detective Smithers. Paul Sorensen as 1st Policeman. Ray Kellogg as 2nd Policeman. Gloria Marshall as Police Dispatcher.)
| 59 | 22 | "Crash Diet" | Byron Paul | Robert and Phyllis White | February 28, 1965 |
Martin needs to lose 3 pounds to be able to fly his spaceship properly. He has a machine that can shrink the 3 pounds from his body. But, Tim presses the wrong switch and instead shrinks the spaceship to the size of a toy. Martin says that the ship will expand back to its normal size in time, but he doesn't know when. A dog comes by and takes off with the ship. The dog brings the ship to his master, Mr. Albert (Cliff Norton), who is a Jolly Toys executive. The dog tells Martin what happened. Tim and Martin go to Mr. Albert's office to steal the ship, except they end up with a toy version. Martin learns that his ship has been sent to a toy store. At the store, Martin and Tim get the growing ship away from a little boy. They find a way to get the fully restored ship back home. (Marge Redmond as Mother. Sue Randall as Miss Turner. Bern Hoffman as Fred.)
| 60 | 23 | "Gone, but Not Forgotten" | Byron Paul | Benedict Freedman | March 7, 1965 |
Martin has a dime-shaped Martian Identity Disk which contains all his personal information. After Martin gets a splinter of invisiflex in his finger, everything he touches temporarily becomes invisible. This causes him to lose his ID Disk and turn most of the furniture in the apartment invisible. Mrs. Brown stops by and Tim tells her that the furniture was stolen. Martin finds his invisible ID Disk and puts it in his jacket pocket. Mrs. Brown calls Det. Brennan. Because of some suspicious items found in the jacket, Brennan takes it to the police station. At the station, Brennan returns the coat. But he has the ID Disk and thinking it is a dime, inserts into a vending machine. Martin has to get it out before it starts sending out its vocal distress signal. Martin manages to get it out of the machine and his invisiflexed finger aids in hiding it from Brennan. (Hedley Mattingly as Gerald Waley. Dick Winslow as Sgt. Leffler.)
| 61 | 24 | "Stop or I'll Steam" | Oscar Rudolph | Burt Styler; Albert E. Lewin | March 14, 1965 |
Martin can literally "let off steam" when aggravated, and Det. Brennan is aggravating him more than usual. While helping to paint Mrs. Brown's house, Det. Brennan throws out his back. They put him in Tim's bed for the time being. But, the Doctor (Arthur Peterson) says he must stay there till he is better. Martin tells Tim that he needs some cold air therapy quickly to normalize his system. Tim will need to keep Mrs. Brown preoccupied. Martin meanwhile will "take care" of Det. Brennan, a statement Brennan overhears and he thinks the worst. Brennan is feeling better, but pretends to still be hurt so as to keep an eye on Martin. Brennan sees Martin hooked up to his cold air contraption. Martin tells him the truth knowing that Brennan will just think he's crazy. (Harry Lauter as Marvin.)
| 62 | 25 | "The Magnetic Personality and Who Needs It" | Oscar Rudolph | Bill Freedman; Ben Gershman | March 21, 1965 |
Tim accidentally magnetizes Martin, turning him into a living magnet. Martin manages to demagnetize himself. Mrs. Brown's introduces her new handyman, reformed pickpocket Andy Fuller (Herbie Faye). Some of Martin's magnetized particles spill onto Andy's hands. Andy's magnetized hands attract Mrs. Brown's new metal brooch. Andy tells Martin and Tim that he thinks he's falling back into his old habits. Knowing that Andy will only be magnetized for another hour, Martin and Tim watch him to keep him out of trouble. It doesn't help that Mrs. Brown puts Andy into a compromising position. But Martin finds a way to protect Andy.
| 63 | 26 | "We Love You, Miss Pringle" | Oscar Rudolph | Blanche Hanalis | March 28, 1965 |
Miss Pringle (Doris Packer), Tim's old high school English teacher, stops by his apartment. The students have chosen Tim to sit on the committee to choose the teacher of the year. Martin reads her mind and finds she being forced to retire due to her age. He also learns that she has been visiting many old students to be reassured that her work was worth while. Martin suggests that Tim get Miss Pringle nominated. Tim doesn't think he can do it, as she was such a tough teacher at Cahuenga High and many people didn't like her. Martin finds a way for the students to learn all the things Miss Pringle did for them and never wanted any credit for. She does become teacher of the year, and she is surprised and touched. She now knows her life work was not in vain. (Randy Kirby as George. Melinda Plowman as Sally. Harry Holcombe as Principal Joseph Arons.)
| 64 | 27 | "Uncle Baby" | James V. Kern | Marty Roth | April 4, 1965 |
Martin is starting to feel old. He needs to go through the process of rejuvenation, which is done with a special light. Before the process is completed, Tim accidentally unplugs the light. This causes Martin to be changed into a baby. Det. Brennan comes by and Tim tells him that the baby was left at his doorstep. Brennan takes the baby to the hospital nursery. Tim brings the light to the hospital, but takes the wrong baby. The light turns the child into an adult formed baby who goes missing. Tim manages to get Martin turned back to normal. They find the other baby and change him back, despite the meddlesome Det. Brennan. (Natalie Masters as Nurse 1.)
| 65 | 28 | "Once Upon a Martian's Mother's Day" | James V. Kern | S : Marty Roth; T : Bill Kelsay | April 11, 1965 |
It's almost Martian Mother's Day and Martin is feeling sad because he misses his mother. Martin runs into Miss Cora Darling (Madge Blake), a spinster who is the spitting image of his mother. Martin wants to do something nice for her. He temporarily turns a worthless but sentimental ring of hers into a valuable piece. But, he didn't think she would sell it to Mr. Hoskins (James Millhollin), a jeweler. Martin devises a plan to get the money from Cora by doing construction work around her house. He then buys the ring back from Hoskins. (Sara Haden as Dora Darling. Richard Reeves as Detective.)
| 66 | 29 | "Uncle Martin's Bedtime Story" | Oscar Rudolph | Burt Styler; Albert E. Lewin | April 25, 1965 |
Mrs. Brown has just bought a new electric bed. Martin intends to piggyback his spaceship to an impending rocket launch to Mars. Turns out Mrs. Brown's bed has a spring in it that matches Martin's brain frequency. She can hear Martin's thoughts whenever she's in bed. Mrs. Brown and Det. Brennan think she has ESP. Martin learns the cause of Mrs. Brown's ESP and has to keep her out of that bed until the launch. Even though she is going to Palm Springs, Brennan will stay at her house. While Martin tries to keep Brennan out of the bed, Brennan winds up doing something that will make Martin miss the launch. At least during all this, the bed spring gets bent and no longer tunes into Martin's brain.
| 67 | 30 | "006 3/4" | Oscar Rudolph | Blanche Hanalis | May 2, 1965 |
Tim comes into possession of a distress note from Agent 006 of TopSecte, an organization to prevent worldwide hostilities. Agent 006 is being tracked by Crush, an international ring of cutthroats, because he has discovered the location of their headquarters. Tim takes the note to Mr. Clary (Les Tremayne) at TopSecte headquarters. Clary asks Tim to assist Agent 004 in defeating Crush and saving 006. Tim agrees when he sees 004, a beautiful woman named Kitty (Susanne Cramer). Clary gives Tim the code name 006 3/4. With invisible Martin's help, Tim and Kitty get into Crush headquarters. Turns out Kitty is a double agent and Martin and Tim get captured. In the end, Kitty really does work for TopSecte and they manage to find and save 006. (Dan Seymour as Fat Man.)
| 68 | 31 | "Never Trust a Naked Martian" | Leslie Goodwins | James Komack | May 9, 1965 |
Tim touches one of Martin's antenna. He becomes invisible and is thrown into limbo. Martin finds a small crack into the dimension but it's getting smaller and smaller. With a running start, Tim makes it through. But he sneezes and falls back into limbo. Tim is about to try again when Mrs. Brown comes by with handyman Mister Dinkle (Robert Jellison). The opening is now gone and Martin must come up with another plan. He remembers that Tim will be able to get out of limbo by actually doing the limbo under a burning broomstick. Tim tries it and makes it out.
| 69 | 32 | "Martin's Favorite Martian" | James V. Kern | Phyllis White; Robert White | May 16, 1965 |
Martin and Tim are out in Death Valley to fix Martin's space ship which was damaged by smog. Martin goes off looking for some restorium, a material he needs to fix the ship. Tim tries on Martin's space suit and fools around with his laser gun. He is captured by Daniel Farrow (Olan Soule), who thinks Tim's a Martian. Daniel's children, Sally (Linda Evans) and Gerald (Kim Tyler), seem to like Tim. Martin goes under cover as a prospector to help Tim. Gerald finds Martin's hidden ship. To distract the family, Tim acts like a kind but powerful Martian. Meanwhile, Martin repairs his ship. With Martin's help, Tim flies away in the ship. Martin convinces Daniel that Tim was friendly.
| 70 | 33 | "The Martian's Fair Hobo" | James V. Kern | S : Lila Garret, Bernie Kahn; T : Marty Roth | May 23, 1965 |
Martin is trying to contact a Martian patrol ship. Martin doesn't know it, but he contacts an Earth rocket named Martian Scout. He is told to contact Shorty Smith, who in actuality works in the Australian tracking station. After a lot of searching, Martin finds a hobo named Shorty Smith (Guy Marks) and brings him home. Mrs. Brown comes by and introduces her widowed friend, Jenny Holbrook (Amzie Strickland). When Martin finds out the truth about the Martian Scout and the real Shorty Smith, they kick their Shorty Smith back out onto the street. Having gotten used to finer living, Shorty comes back. Martin comes up with the idea to hook Shorty up with Jenny. At first Shorty thinks Jenny is too good for him, but they get together when he realizes that the two have something in common. (Johnny Jacobs as Newscaster.)
| 71 | 34 | "A Martian Sonata in Mrs. B's Flat" | Oscar Rudolph | Ron Friedman | May 30, 1965 |
Martin is mixing up some liquid musical distillate. It can transfer the energy of music into a person and they will be able to perform it. Mrs. Brown asks Tim and Martin to listen to her piano performance at her woman's club meeting. She is awful. She uses the excuse that she needs her music which is in Tim's apartment. Mrs. Brown finds some of Martin's distillate and thinks it's perfume. When she returns, she is now a virtuoso. Mrs. Wooster (Mona Bruns), the club chair, thinks that Mrs. Brown should be the main attraction at a musical fund-raiser. Martin convinces retired concert pianist, Ilya Politnikoff (Leon Belasco), to perform instead. Mrs. Wooster suggests the two play a duet. Before the concert, Politnikoff uses some of the distillate, which is in the form of hand cream and meant for Mrs. Brown. Unfortunately, this causes Politnikoff to become musically incapacitated. Martin disables the strings in the two pianos. He then has the music come out of him while Politnikoff and Mrs. Brown think they're playing.
| 72 | 35 | "The Green Eyed Martian" | Oscar Rudolph | Phyllis White; Robert White | June 6, 1965 |
Martin is working on a rocket fuel and needs to get rid of nosy Det. Brennan. Martin decides to use his irresistible serum on a suitable suitor for Mrs. Brown, hoping she will fall for that person and dump Brennan. Mrs. Brown finds the liquid, and thinking it's perfume, sprays it on herself. Martin sees her and falls madly in love with her. Next it's Mr. Sanders (Henry Corden) the butcher and Brennan who fall for her. Tim figures out what happened. Martin wants to fly Mrs. Brown to another planet. Tim finds the book with the antidote and learns that it is simple everyday aspirin. Tim gets Mrs. Brown to take the aspirin right before Martin is to fly her away and reveal his Martian identity to everyone involved. (Owen Bush as Postman.)
| 73 | 36 | "El Senor from Mars" | Oscar Rudolph | Ben Gershman; Bill Freedman | June 13, 1965 |
Martin and Tim jet to Mexico to prevent a treasure chest from exposing a tablet inside marking Martin's arrival on Earth during the Aztec era. The tablet also has a carving of Martin's likeness. They find the chest, which is scheduled to be opened at a big festival the following day, in the Police Chief's (Dan Seymour) office. Because he ate too many peppers, Martin's antenna won't go down and he must wear a sombrero. After creating a diversion, Martin gets the tablet out of the chest and disappears, leaving Tim to deal with the chief. However, Martin's antenna didn't disappear when he did, leaving a floating pair of antenna. Martin destroys the tablet. He also realizes that his ailment has reached a critical stage, and he will eventually go invisible forever except for his antenna. Martin remembers just in time that a certain mineral contained in the chest is an antidote for his ailment. (Bernie Kopell as Señor Pepe Lopez.)
| 74 | 37 | "Time Out for Martian" | James V. Kern | Marty Roth | June 20, 1965 |
Martin builds a time machine hoping to go back to before he crashed his space ship. Tim touches the machine and inadvertently sends the two of them back to England in 1215 AD. Martin sets about to fix the broken time machine. Tim helps a young man being attacked and in doing so, prevents the Magna Carta from being delivered to the Archbishop of Canterbury. Before Martin and Tim can take the Magna Carta to the Archbishop, they meet the Duchess of Brimstone. She actually works for King John (Anthony Eustrel), who opposes signing the Magna Carta. She distracts Tim and drugs Martin, allowing her henchman Basil to destroy the parchment. Plus, the drug shrinks Martin. Martin helps Tim create a copy of the Magna Carta and they go to see the King. Martin's tiny size and Martian tricks scare the King into signing. Martin also finds an antidote for the drug he took. Tim and Martin get to the time machine and return home. Note: This episode was postponed for broadcast until the end of the series' third and final season, airing it finally on May 8, 1966.
| 75 | 38 | "Portrait in Brown" | James V. Kern | Phyllis White; Robert White | June 27, 1965 |
Martin builds a machine that turns 3D items into 2D. Mrs. Brown inadvertently walks in front of the machine and gets turned into a 2D object. Being organic, the 2D Mrs. Brown will become permanent in 18 hours. Martin needs a certain metallic compound to restore her. In the mean time, Martin makes her look like a painting. Det. Brennan sees the painting and suggests hanging it in a friend's art gallery. Tim and Martin sneak into the gallery that night. But before they can do anything, some art thieves steal the painting of Mrs. Brown. The thieves whitewash over the canvasses so they can smuggle them away. Martin and Tim find the thieves' hide-out. They elude the thieves and Det. Brennan and get Mrs. Brown's painting. Mrs. Brown is restored in time. Lisa Seagram as Felicia Fratoli. (Herb Andress as Mechanical Man. Harvey Lembeck as Rembrandt Jones.) Note: Last black-and-white episode.

=== Season 3 (1965–66) ===
All episodes now in color.

| No. overall | No. in season | Title | Directed by | Written by | Original release date |
|---|---|---|---|---|---|
| 76 | 1 | "Go West, Young Martian: Part 1" | David Alexander | Martin Roth | September 12, 1965 |
Brennan flicks a switch on Martin's time machine and Martin and Tim are accidentally transported to St. Louis, circa 1849. Because neither of them were holding the time machine, it was sent back in time but stayed in California. When they eat before leaving, Tim pays with 20th century money which the owner says is counterfeit. They are arrested by a Marshal Brennan, Brennan's ancestor. They manage to escape and get on a riverboat. Onboard, they meet Mrs. Brown's ancestor, Lorelei Glutz. Because her dowry's been stolen, she won't make it to California and produce her child that would lead to Mrs. Brown. The thief knows about Martin and Tim's escape from Marshal Brennan. Before he can turn them in, they jump into the Mississippi. They make it to land, but are captured by the thief. They escape again and help Lorelei win big at poker. But, they are then caught by Marshal Brennan. (Hal Baylor as Red. Ken Mayer as Pete. James Jeter as Waiter. Emile Meyer as Ship's Captain.) Note: First color episode.
| 77 | 2 | "Go West, Young Martian: Part 2" | David Alexander | Martin Roth | September 19, 1965 |
Still stuck in the past and imprisoned to boot, Martin draws Tim a map of where the time machine is located in case they are separated. After they break out, they are ambushed by Red and Pete. Pete finds Tim's map and believes it's to a gold mine. They wake up in a wagon train headed west, where Loralei is taking care of them. Tim realizes the map is gone and Martin figures that whoever stole it must be on the wagon train. Red and Pete kidnap Loralei and hold her hostage in exchange for Tim and Martin forgetting about the map. They find Red, Pete and Loralei and scare off the thieves, who leave the map behind. Martin, Tim and Loralei are then abducted by Indians, who have also captured Marshall Brennan. Martin tricks the Indians into letting them all go. Martin and Tim get separated from Loralei and Brennan. The Indians and now the Cavalry, thanks to Brennan, are after Martin and Tim. They find the time machine to transport themselves back to 1965 just as the Cavalry and Indians are arriving. Back home they find the time machine damaged and an Indian came back with them. (John Alvin as Colonel.)
| 78 | 3 | "Martin of the Movies" | John Erman | Albert E. Lewin & Burt Styler | September 26, 1965 |
Martin reveals to Tim that he starred in a silent film in 1925. That film is scheduled to air on television tonight. Since his appearance in the movie would raise questions, he needs to use his time machine and go back to change things. Tim accidentally winds up going back in time with Martin. At the movie set, Martin cannot help getting involved again. But instead of playing the part himself, he decides to find someone else. He chooses a waiter named Joe (John Considine), who with the help of a Martian pill, will be a great actor. The only problem is that leading lady Viola Normandy (Arlene Martel) wants Tim for the part. Tim gets swept up in the moment and thinks he's a star. Martin finds a way to get Tim to give up on being famous. He also finds a way to ease Tim missing Viola. (Leon Askin as Von Reinbein. Howard Morton as Irving. Barbara Perry as Miss Hotchkiss.)
| 79 | 4 | "Keep Me from the Church on Time" | John Erman | James B. Allardice & Tom Adair | October 3, 1965 |
Martin shows Tim his Futuroid camera that has the ability to take a photograph of events 24 hours in the future. Both men are shocked to see what appears to be Tim getting married. Tim wants to avoid women for the next 24 hours, but has to do a story at the Kitten Club. At the club, Martin and Tim run into Louise Babcock (Yvonne Craig). Because she hasn't given Tim the time of day in the past, they figure it's not her in the picture. She's in love with a man named Sam Evans (Noam Pitlik). Louise wants Sam to show his love by being more jealous. Back at home, Louise shows up on Tim's doorstep. Martin and Tim discover that she is the woman in the photograph. Louise's strict father (Parley Baer) and strong brother barge in on them. Mr. Babcock insists that Tim marry Louise in Tijuana. Martin manages to get Sam involved. Though it seems Tim and Louise get married, Tim was only a proxy stand-in for Sam. (Don Diamond as Judge Gonzales. Penny Santon as Miss Gonzales. Shannon Farnon as Caroline.)
| 80 | 5 | "I'd Rather Fight Than Switch" | David Alexander | Philip Rapp | October 10, 1965 |
Martin's latest invention causes him to accidentally swap his psyche with Mrs. Brown. To make matters worse, Mrs. Brown has a date with Det. Brennan and her brother Leroy (Bill Idelson) is coming in from Washington. Martin, looking like Mrs. Brown, goes on the date and tries to not attract the detective's suspicion. Martin learns that Brennan wants to propose to Mrs. Brown. He needs to change himself and Mrs. Brown back within a couple of hours, or this switch will be permanent. Martin has run out of the mineral needed to make the change, but a diamond will also work. Martin, as Mrs. Brown, gets the diamond ring from Brennan just in time to change himself and Mrs. Brown back. Mrs. Brown's brother shows up. But, after the change back, Mrs. Brown has no recollection of any part of the evening. Martin levitates the ring back into Brennan's pocket, who starts to think he's losing his mind. (Jack Donner as Master of Ceremonies.)
| 81 | 6 | "Tim the Mastermind" | David Alexander | Burt Styler & Albert E. Lewin | October 17, 1965 |
Martin starts getting green spots after developing an allergy to his memory pills. Without the pills, he won't be able to complete his gravitational studies. Tim reluctantly agrees to take the pills instead as he has excess unused brain capacity. After taking the pills, Tim is now the smartest man on Earth. Martin also makes it so that a snap of a finger will bring him in and out of the genius state. Tim is called off to cover a story on DeWitt Merrick (Lee Bergere), an astronomical engineer. Before meeting Merrick, Tim passes a flamenco dancer, who snaps his fingers, putting Tim in a state of brilliance. Merrick believes Tim can solve all of his scientific problems. Tim goes to work for the US government on Project Galileo, which deals with Mars. Martin gets to Tim and reverses the effects of the pills. But he exacts too much of Tim's brain power and turns him into the equivalent of a child. Back at home, Martin turns Tim back into himself. (Harry Holcombe as Arthur Nelson.)
| 82 | 7 | "Martin Goldfinger" | Wesley Kenney | Burt Styler & Albert E. Lewin | October 24, 1965 |
Martian develops a gold deficiency which means that everything he touches turns to gold. To fix his problem, Martin realizes he needs to eat something that has been grown in gold enriched soil. Because Martin can't touch anything, he decides Tim should go to Fort Knox. There Tim could pick up some greens that have grown by a stream that runs close to the gold vault. But before Tim can leave, they get stuck having dinner with Mrs. Brown and Det. Brennan. As they are leaving after dinner, Martin touches a dinner roll and turns it into gold. Brennan does some detecting and believes that Martin and Tim are smuggling gold. Tim arrives home with the greens just in time to cure Martin's gold deficiency. Martin changes the furniture he had turned to gold back to wood before Brennan can arrest them. (Harry Lauter as Police Captain.)
| 83 | 8 | "Bottled Martin" | Wesley Kenney | Burt Styler & Albert E. Lewin | October 31, 1965 |
Martin is too heavy for his spaceship. He finds a way to shrink himself to 6 ounces, but the process is temporary. Martin asks Tim to cork him inside a wine bottle with the necessary gas that will make the shrinking process longer lasting. If the experiment works, he will then fill his ship with the same gas. Martin plans to stay inside the bottle all day to make sure it works. Unfortunately, the bottle gets collected with an overseas relief package destined for Baghdad. Tim flies off to Baghdad. The package gets delivered to the home of Abu (Paul Verdier), whose girlfriend Nadja (Linda Gaye Scott) is to marry the Sultan (Howard Caine). Abu releases Martin from the bottle and believes he is a genie. Despite Tim and Abu being captured by the Sultan, Martin finds a way to free them and get Nadja back for Abu. (Naomi Stevens as Mama.)
| 84 | 9 | "Hate Me a Little" | Mel Ferber | Gene L. Coon | November 7, 1965 |
Martin fixes his benevolence bulb so it works on humans and turns them into very nice people. Tim ends up using it on Det. Brennan, but the effect is delayed. Despite not liking Brennan, Martin doesn't think a detective should be too nice. Using his futuroid camera, Martin finds that Brennan will become nice when he encounters notorious bank robber, Frank Talbert (Norman Alden) the next day. Martin rigs a device to change Brennan back to mean just as he's in the bank. But the device accidentally turns Martin catatonic. Tim brings Martin to the bank hoping for the best. Martin accidentally turns the Bank Guard (Don Haggerty) and Talbert into nice guys. Brennan shows up to the bank and turns nice. Brennan and Talbert happily go to the jail to talk over old times. While sitting in the jail cell reminiscing, Martin changes them back to their bad old selves.
| 85 | 10 | "Girl in the Flying Machine" | Mel Ferber | Blanche Hanalis | November 14, 1965 |
Martin accidentally pulls a Slobodian astro-ship and its beautiful female pilot down from orbit. To give him time to figure out what to do, he puts her memory on Martian tape, and he brings her back to the apartment. Martin tells her she is his niece, Zelda (Jill Ireland), and that she has a case of amnesia. Martin figures he can fix Zelda's ship in 24 hours using parts from his own ship. Meanwhile, Mrs. Brown's psychologist nephew, George (Bernie Kopell), is trying to help Zelda unlock her memory. Tim learns the space agency has narrowed down where they figure Zelda's ship has crashed. Another problem is that Mrs. Brown finds Zelda's memory tape and has gained Zelda's memory of being an astro-pilot, giving Mrs. Brown a split personality. Martin manages to fix Zelda's spaceship and transfer her conscious memory back from Mrs. Brown. But Zelda finds out the truth of the entire situation. Because of the kindness of strangers who helped fix her ship, Zelda vows to keep Martin being a Martian a secret. (Chick Hearn as Radio Voice.)
| 86 | 11 | "That Time Machine Is Waking Up That Old Gang of Mine" | Jean Yarbrough | James Allardice & Tom Adair | November 21, 1965 |
Martin's time machine malfunctions, causing Jesse (Mort Mills) and Frank James (L. Q. Jones) to appear in Tim's kitchen. The James brothers hold Martin and Tim hostage. Mrs. Brown walks in and is also held hostage. The brothers decide to use the time machine steal things from various times in history. They take Mrs. Brown, her car and the time machine and leave. Before time traveling, the brothers decide to rob a train in a remote, deserted "western" town. Martin and Tim get there, but are tied up by a Railroad Detective (Stafford Repp). They get free but then are caught by Frank and Jesse. Using some cowboy hats and some recorded gunshots, Martin tricks the brothers back to their proper time. Martin then uses a mind clearing device to get Mrs. Brown to forget what happened with Frank and Jesse.
| 87 | 12 | "Avenue 'C' Mob" | John Erman | Blanche Hanalis | November 28, 1965 |
Martin temporarily ages himself 400 Martian years as part of a study of old age on Earth. He then takes a job as a night watchman so he can experience the pursuit of independence in old age. At work, Martin catches two elderly sisters, Tessie (Lurene Tuttle) and Matilda Harvey (Nydia Westman) breaking into the warehouse. They claim that their valuable possessions are being stored there by a Mr. Filbert (Murray Matheson). He won't let them sell the items to open a teahouse. Filbert shows up and Martin hides the women. What no one knows is that he is a jewel thief and has just had the Raja sapphire stolen. He hides it in one of the Harvey's covered chalices. After Filbert leaves, Martin allows the sisters to leave, but not before they take the chalice with the sapphire, which they don't know is inside. The sisters find the sapphire and bring it to Martin. Martin sets a trap for Filbert. Despite some complications, Martin captures Filbert. Tim gets a story and the sisters get the reward money. (Jamie Farr as Benny. John Crawford as Announcer (voice).)
| 88 | 13 | "Tim and Tim Again" | John Erman | S : Martin Roth; T : Bill Kelsay | December 5, 1965 |
Martin changes his duplicating machine to make the duplicates permanent. He accidentally ends up duplicating Tim. Martin leaves to gather a necessary element to reverse the process. George (Steve Franken), Mrs. Brown's psychologist nephew, comes snooping around. Using Martin's personality altecator, the duplicate changes his personality to evil. The evil Tim takes the real Tim's money, the real Tim's girl, and plans to reveal Martin's identity. He also plans to take the real Tim's life by proving he's the original and not the duplicate. The evil Tim tries to sell the story to a magazine, but the real Tim gets to the office just in time to stop the deal. Martin shows up and figure outs which Tim is which and the evil Tim is eliminated. George's snooping does cause one more problem. (Melinda O. Fee as Sylvia.)
| 89 | 14 | "Lorelei Brown vs. Everybody" | Jean Yarbrough | Bill Kelsay | December 12, 1965 |
Mrs. Brown can't remember what she did with a letter of Martin's. To help her concentrate, Martin gives her a concentration pill. She finds the letter before taking the pill, but keeps the pill. Mrs. Brown then goes to a Police Officers award night with Det. Brennan. She takes the pill there and she now concentrates on enforcing law and order. Lorelei starts writing out tickets for everything and to everyone. She even buys a short wave radio to monitor police calls. Mrs. Brown goes on a call that involves Mugs Carson (Victor French), an armed criminal holed up in a house. She slips into the house and then Brennan, Martin and Tim follow her. Lorelei, Brennan and Tim are captured by Mugs. An invisible Martin helps Mugs to be captured. The effects of the pill wear off, and Mrs. Brown is back to her old self. (Roy Engel as Police Captain. Charles Stewart as Patrolman.)
| 90 | 15 | "The O'Hara Caper" | John Erman | Albert E. Lewin & Burt Styler | December 19, 1965 |
Tim missed out on an important story about the robbery of the Beaudelaire jewels and is demoted to writing obituaries. Martin reluctantly agrees to let Tim use Martin's time machine to go back and get the story. Once back, Tim inadvertently gets involved with the robbery. The crooks get away but Tim is arrested as their look-out man. While speaking to Det. Brennan, Tim makes it sound as though Martin were the mastermind behind the theft. Tim also identifies the two real thieves, Slippery Sam and Roger the Rake (Howard Morton). Brennan informs Tim that the thieves have been in jail and couldn't have robbed the jewels. Martin goes undercover as a prisoner to find out how Sam and Roger pulled off the job if they were supposed to be behind bars. Martin finds out how they escaped and sets up a trap to catch them red-handed with the jewels. (Bryan O'Byrne as Salesman.)
| 91 | 16 | "Who's Got a Secret?" | John Erman | Martin Roth | December 26, 1965 |
Mrs. Brown's big talking brother, Alvin Wannamaker (Gavin MacLeod), arrives for a visit. Mrs. Brown's woman's club luncheon hosts a General (Donald Briggs) as a guest speaker. Alvin suggests to the General that he is working on a top secret project with Martin. Soon the story gets out that there is a Project Jiminy and the Department of Defense wants to put Martin on their payroll. The terrorist organization Crush kidnaps Alvin because of their interest in the secret project. Martin and Tim find Crush headquarters, but Alvin gets them captured as well. Martin finds a way for him, Alvin and Tim to escape. Martin does come up with something for Project Jiminy and he shows it to both the US and Russian governments. (Larry D. Mann as Fat Man. Ben Wright as Vladimir. James Sikking as Aide.)
| 92 | 17 | "Heir Today, Gone Tomorrow" | Jean Yarbrough | Ben Starr | January 2, 1966 |
Tim stands to inherent some money from the estate of Martha and Ralph O'Hara (Bruce Glover). Assuming he can prove he is the right Tim O'Hara. Clarence O'Hara (Allan Melvin) claims that family records say that Tim O'Hara does not have an Uncle Martin. Using Martin's time machine, Tim goes back to 1920 and the day that Martha and Ralph register the name of their newborn son Frank. Tim gets Ralph to change the name to Martin instead, thus putting a Martin in the family. Trying to get home, Tim winds up in 1945 Cleveland instead. He finds out that Frank aka Martin becomes a murderer and bank robber. Which means back in 1965, Martin is a wanted man. Tim goes back to 1920 and Ralph and Martha name the boy Roger. Tim eventually makes it back to his apartment in 1965. There he learns the entire estate was only $4 worth of depreciated stocks. (Jonathan Hole as Walter Poppe. Paul Sorensen as 1st Policeman. Norman Bartold as 2nd Policeman.)
| 93 | 18 | "Martin's Revoltin' Development" | Jean Yarbrough | Leigh Chapman | January 16, 1966 |
Tim is to go on an assignment with photographer Jimmy McClain. Tim claims that whenever Jimmy is around, something goes wrong. Martin has read Jimmy's mind and knows that since childhood Jimmy has been told he can't do anything right. Martin would like to help him. At the assignment, Jimmy gets an exclusive photograph but it includes Martin. Martin sadly has to destroy the photograph and Jimmy gets fired. Martin makes plans for Jimmy to get an exclusive photo of notorious gangster Joey Makin. Before leaving, Jimmy touches one of Martin's machines which makes him lose his balance for a temporary period of time. At the crime scene, Jimmy gets Martin, Tim and himself caught by Joey. Martin manages to free Jimmy. With the help of his levitation finger, Martin then helps Jimmy capture Joey and his gang. Jimmy gets his job back and has gained self-confidence for the first time in his life. (Michael Conrad as A.C. Nicholas Colasanto as Orville.)
| 94 | 19 | "TV or Not TV" | John Erman | Michael R. Stein & Jack Gross Jr. | January 23, 1966 |
Martin develops a short-circuit which causes him to start intermittently transmitting everything he sees and hears onto television worldwide. He has a special pair of sunglasses to wear that will block the transmitter. Martin needs to get some wiring from a television camera to fix the short circuit. He goes with Tim to the television station, where Tim is to interview matinée idol Chad Foster (Conrad Janis). Chad would like to try on Martin's sunglasses. When he returns the glasses, a series of accidents exposes that Chad wears a toupee, shoulder/chest/thigh pads, lifts in his shoes and a girdle. Unfortunately, this occurs just as Martin's transmitter turns on, broadcasting all of this to the entire television viewing public. Chad's career could be over. Martin comes up with a plan to save Chad's career. Tim interviews Chad once again and without Chad knowing it, Martin broadcasts it to the world. The interview changes Chad, matinée idol, into Chad the funny-man. Chad's career is saved. (Patricia Smith as Peggy Reynolds. Dan Frazer as Clete Baxter. Chick Hearn as Announcer (voice).)
| 95 | 20 | "Man from Uncle Martin" | John Erman | James Allardice & Tom Adair | January 30, 1966 |
Mrs. Brown's brother, Alvin, buys a worthless piece of junk invention with Mrs. Brown's money. He's calling the machine "Wannamaker's Widdle Wife Saver" and it's a housewife's answer to chores. Alvin believes that once Martin gets it working it will make them rich. Even Martin can't fix it. Martin and Tim decide to try to sell it back to the man Alvin bought it from. Dr. Dunlap (Arthur Malet) is a swindler, but Martin convinces him that the machine will make millions. Martin also had Alvin ready to sell until Alvin and Lorelei see Martin do some Martian trickery with the machine. Alvin now believes the machine really works. Martin comes up with a plan to get Dunlap to pay much more for the machine than what Alvin paid for it. (John Lasell as Mr. Morgan.)
| 96 | 21 | "Martin the Mannequin" | David Alexander | Martin Roth | February 6, 1966 |
A reaction to Homme Fatale, a cologne in a department store, causes Martin to freeze up like a mannequin. It could be permanent unless he gets blasted by some molecular revitalizing rays from his ray gun. The store's floor manager (Woodrow Parfrey) won't let Tim take the mannequin or buy him. Tim goes home and gets the gun. When Tim gets back, Mrs. Brown and Det. Brennan are also at the store. With them around, Tim can't shoot Martin. Tim gets a young boy to try to shoot the gun. Unfortunately he shoots Mrs. Brown instead, turning her into a mannequin as well. Tim manages to unfreeze Martin. Martin tries to keep Brennan busy, while Tim tries to give Lorelei the antidote, a whiff of Homme Fatale. Tim breaks the bottle of perfume and someone just bought the last bottle of it in the store. It takes some doing, but they track down the perfume and unfreeze Mrs. Brown. (Eve McVeagh as Mother. Ted Quinn as little boy, Alfred.)
| 97 | 22 | "Butterball" | David Alexander | Blanche Hanalis | February 13, 1966 |
CRUSH is reactivated when their leader Butterball (Larry D. Mann) escapes from prison. Tim is worried that Butterball will come after him because Tim helped put him in jail. Martin tells him not to worry and leaves. Butterball kidnaps Tim. Martin finds where they are keeping Tim, but gets captured as well. Butterball thinks that Martin and Tim have some vital information about TopSeek that he needs. Martin learns that henchman Delilah (Eileen O'Neill) was drugged and put under Butterball's control. Martin brings her back from the drug and she tells him that Butterball intends to blow up TopSeek's headquarters. They manage to capture Butterball. While Tim and Delilah try to warn TopSeek, Martin tries to find the mechanism that will detonate the bomb. Butterball gets free and captures the three again. Thanks to a trick a certain TV witch uses, Martin prevents Butterball from blowing up the bomb. (Kathryn Minner as Mama. Tony Martinez as Glob.)
| 98 | 23 | "When a Martian Makes His Violin Cry" | John Erman | Austin & Irma Kalish | February 20, 1966 |
Mrs. Brown's purse is stolen at a carnival. Brennan suspects and arrests Raymond (John Considine), a young gypsy. Martin reads Raymond's mind and knows he didn't do it. Raymond places a curse on Mrs. Brown so she will constantly drop things. Brennan and Martin believe Mrs. Brown's curse is all in her mind. At the jail, Martin asks Raymond to lift the curse. He refuses and because Brennan won't release him, he puts the same curse on Brennan. Martin goes undercover as a gypsy and is about to remove the curse from Mrs. Brown. Brennan is arresting other gypsies and also takes Martin in. Brennan is about to book all the gypsies down at the police station. Martin says that he has lifted the curse from Mrs. Brown and has placed it on Brennan. The real thief of Mrs. Brown's purse is caught and is not a gypsy. With a little Martian trickery, Martin gets all the gypsies released. (Penny Santon as Grandmother. Len Lesser as Carlo. Shelley Morrison as Narita. Roy Engel as Police Captain.)
| 99 | 24 | "When You Get Back Home to Mars, Are You Going to Get It" | Jean Yarbrough | Martin Roth | February 27, 1966 |
Martin's 11-year-old nephew Andromeda steals his father's ship and crash lands on Earth. Andromeda is a proud Martian, and doesn't understand why Martin is pretending to be an Earthling. Andromeda refuses to wear Earth clothes and be called Andy. When Mrs. Brown and Det. Brennan show up, Andy tells them he is from Mars. They think he just has an active imagination. To help him fit in, Martin sends Andy to school. But Andy again refuses to hide his Martian background and demonstrates his Martian abilities to his teacher and classmates. The children all go off running from an obvious alien. Andy is hurt by their attitude, but Martin tried to warn him. The police arrive at Tim's apartment and discover Martin's spaceship. Martin uses his time machine to take the three of them back to just before Andy heads off to school. Andy has learned his lesson and won't start anymore trouble. Note: Despite the ending indicating Andromeda was to stay with Tim and Martin, this was the only appearance of the character in the live-action series. Andromeda would later appear in the animated series.
| 100 | 25 | "Doggone Martin" | John Erman | Albert E. Lewin | March 6, 1966 |
Tim brings home a lost dog hoping Martin can find out from the dog where he lives. Martin develops a machine to turn himself into a liquid, intent on sending himself back to Mars in that state. He plans to leave that night. After Martin turns himself into liquid, Tutu the dog drinks him. But Martin has control of the dogs body and can talk to Tim. Martin figures out a way to separate himself from the dog and sends Tim out for a certain chemical. Tutu gets caught by a dog catcher and gets sent to the dog pound where it is picked up by its owner. Tim finds his way to Tutu's owners, the Frisby's (James Frawley and Sarah Marshall). Tim manages to get the dog back to his apartment. After several attempts, Tim separates Tutu and Martin successfully. Unfortunately, they used up the rare Martian chemical Martin needed to distillate. Once again Martin's plan to return to Mars is put on hold.
| 101 | 26 | "Virus M for Martin" | David Alexander | Bill Kelsay | March 13, 1966 |
When Tim comes home early from a Mexican assignment, he walks in on Martin who is clearing himself of a Martian Virus. Tim becomes the first Earth man to catch it and is soon covered in red stripes across his face. Lt. Brennan comes by and thinks Tim has a contagious tropical disease. Brennan calls for an ambulance to take Tim to the hospital. At the hospital, Martin and Tim manage to hide from Brennan. Martin wraps Tim's head with medical bandages and then goes to make an antidote. Tim is then mistaken for a missing patient who is supposed to be in surgery. He is given a general anesthetic. Martin finds Tim, but he can't give him the antidote because of possible side effects from the anesthetic. Tim has to let the virus run its course, which includes some hot and cold symptoms. Tim is finally cured and Martin makes Brennan look crazy in the eyes of a doctor. (Jack Collins as Sam. Jamie Farr as Fred. Paula Stewart as Nurse Jones.)
| 102 | 27 | "Our Notorious Landlady" | David Alexander | Gene Thompson | March 20, 1966 |
While dusting Martin's personality altercator, Mrs. Brown accidentally activates it and gets turned into a thief. Martin makes an antidote, but it will take some time before it's ready to use. Meanwhile, Lorelei shoplifts some small items which Martin and Tim plan to take back. Det. Brennan comes by and mentions that he will be providing security for the Slotkin Diamond. Martin and Tim know that Lorelei will want to steal it. However, someone else actually steals the diamond. Brennan suspects that Martin stole it. He would like Mrs. Brown to try to find out where he's hidden the diamond. Lorelei overhears that Martin figures out that the real thief is the security guard hired to transport the diamond, Jack Plummer (Hal Baylor). Martin and Tim have to beat Mrs. Brown to Jack and the diamond. Martin then manages to have Brennan catch Plumber with the diamond and give Lorelei the antidote. (Roy Engel as Police Captain. Peter Brocco as Curator.)
| 103 | 28 | "Martin Meets His Match" | David Alexander | S : Gene Thompson; T : Gene Thompson, Bill Kelsay | March 27, 1966 |
Martin has reached an impasse trying to fix his spaceship. He uses his time machine to bring Leonardo Da Vinci (Michael Constantine) to the present. Mrs. Brown tells them that the Mona Lisa is currently on loan to a local museum and Det. Brennan is in charge of security. An angry Da Vinci sneaks out of Tim's apartment. Martin reads his mind and learns that Leonardo wants to steal the painting. When Martin and Tim get to the museum, they find the crate that held the painting open and empty. Martin is afraid that Leonardo will figure out how to use the time machine. Back at the apartment, Tim tries to get the painting away from Leonardo and it gets destroyed. They ask Da Vinci to paint a new version of the painting. Needing a model, they use Mrs. Brown, who is under a spell. The painting looks like Lorelei and not the Mona Lisa, but Leonardo likes it better. Martin recreates the Mona Lisa himself. It may no longer be a true Da Vinci, but it'll fool the world. Da Vinci goes back to the 15th century with his new masterpiece, the Mona Loralei. Martin gets the Mona Lisa back to the museum only to find the Mona Loralei there as well. (Joe Higgins as Guard #1.)
| 104 | 29 | "Horse and Buggy Martin" | David Alexander | Albert E. Lewin | April 3, 1966 |
Martin is bitten by a mosquito. The next person bitten by the mosquito will get some Martin residue in him. This will cause Martin to feel everything that next person is feeling and vice versa. To create an antidote, Martin will need a blood sample from whoever is bitten. It turns out that the mosquito next bites a racehorse. Martin finds that the horse he is looking for is Sweet Sister and the horse is running better than ever. Martin poses as a vet and gets a blood sample from the horse. William (Bern Hoffman), a betting syndicate member, sees Martin taking the sample and thinks he is doping her. William gives the horse a drugged apple, which also causes Martin to be lethargic. Martin believes that his will power will help Sweet Sister overcome the effects of the drug. With a little help from Tim and Sweet Sister's owner, Kerry Green (Janis Hansen), the horse wins the race. (Trevor Bardette as Grandpa Green.)
| 105 | 30 | "Stop the Presses, I Want to Get Off" | Jean Yarbrough | Austin and Irma Kalish | April 17, 1966 |
Martin accidentally loses his Martian "sixth sense" to Mrs. Brown, while he has it out of his body for cleaning. Mrs. Brown is now suspicious of Martin since he wants his sixth sense back from her. Brennan breaks the regenerator which Martin needed to regain his sixth sense. Her new abilities allow her to become a journalist for a competing paper of Tim's, knowing when and where stories are going to happen. They also put her at risk of figuring out Martin's true identity. Tim gets fired. Brennan and Tim follow Lorelei on her latest scoop. Apparently she was chasing an escaped lion in an abandoned house, which will put the three of them in danger. Brennan takes Mrs. Brown outside. Martin shows up with the repaired regenerator and changes the lion into a cat. The Police Captain shows up and Brennan is made to look foolish when they see the cat. Martin gets his sixth sense back from Mrs. Brown.
| 106 | 31 | "My Nut Cup Runneth Over" | John Erman | S : Bill Kelsay; T : Bill Kelsay, Gene Thompson | April 24, 1966 |
Martin's molecular reassembler is malfunctioning. Tim touches the machine and accidentally turns a squirrel into a human being (Hal England). Martin has 8 hours to fix the machine or the change becomes permanent. Martin agrees to have the squirrel's large family move in. Meanwhile, Mrs. Brown tells Tim that Brennan has been put in charge of the Police Follies. Brennan and Mrs. Brown come for a visit and Martin introduces the squirrel as Red Squirrelton. Brennan says he saw a squirrel entering the apartment and they should call in an exterminator. Red and his family take offense and run off. Tim finds Red in the local nut shop. Martin and a policeman show up. Martin explains that they are a singing group called The Squirrels and are performing at the Police Follies. They do perform at the Follies and are a hit. After the performance, Martin turns Red back into a squirrel. Nora Denney as Woman.
| 107 | 32 | "Pay the Man the $24" | John Erman | Burt Styler | May 1, 1966 |
As part of research for a book he is writing, Tim uses Martin's time machine to travel back to the purchase of Manhattan. Returning to the present, he soon learns he messed up the deal and New York is no longer part of the United States. Martin learns that Tim accidentally implied to Chief Buffalo (Herb Ellis) that the price for the island was a "steal". The Chief then thinks that Peter Minuit (Leon Askin) is trying to steal the island. Tim and Martin have to travel back in time to try to put history back on track. Martin speaks to the Chief and almost convinces him to sell the island. Chief Buffalo's daughter, Little Feather (Shelley Morrison), is smitten with Tim. Tim unknowingly becomes engaged to Little Feather. As a wedding gift, the Chief gives Manhattan to Tim. Martin finds Young Deer, the man Little Feather is really supposed to marry. Martin then acts as the Great Warrior Spirit to convince Chief Buffalo to sell the island. Herb Andress as Assistant.

== Home media ==
Rhino Entertainment released the first two seasons on Region 1 DVD in 2004–2005. Rhino never released the third season. However, the season 3 release from Australia's Umbrella Entertainment, on February 5, 2008, was as an import to North America. This release is classified as "Region 0", making it viewable around the world on any region-free DVD player. Rhino also released a three-DVD box of "The Best of My Favorite Martian" in 2007, comprising episodes 1, 2, 3, 5, 7, 9, 14, 16, 18, 22, 24, 29, 31, 34, and 37.

In January 2010, MPI Home Video acquired the series' Region 1 rights under license from the Jack Chertok estate-owned Jack Chertok Productions. At the time, it was announced that they planned on releasing season 3 on DVD in the summer of 2010. This release, however, never materialized and was postponed. It was subsequently released on October 30, 2012.

MPI re-released season 1 on June 24, 2014. and season 2 on December 23, 2014. They would go on to release the complete series on October 20, 2015.

In Region 4 (Australia), Umbrella Entertainment released all three seasons on DVD. These releases are all region free. The season 1 release includes special features, such as audio commentary with Ann Marshall, a stills gallery, script, and interview with Ann Marshall. The season 3 release also includes special features, such as an unaired version of the series pilot, behind the scenes home movies, interviews with Stan Frazen, Ted Rich, James Hulsey, and Wayne Stam, as well as audio commentary by James's Hulsey and Chertok historian and licensing manager Peter Greenwood. In addition, there are also scans of the original comic series, scripts, and the shooting schedule.

| DVD name | Ep # | Release dates | |
| DVD name | Ep # | Region 1 | Region 4 |
|---|---|---|---|
| The Complete 1st Season | 37 | September 7, 2004; June 24, 2014 (re-release) | March 1, 2008 |
| The Complete 2nd Season | 38 | May 10, 2005; December 23, 2014 (re-release) | September 1, 2008 |
| The Complete 3rd Season | 32 | October 30, 2012 | November 3, 2007 |
| The Complete Series | 107 | October 20, 2015 | n/a |

== Reception ==
In its first season, My Favorite Martian did very well in the Nielsen ratings, ranking at No. 10. However, by the end of the second season the show had dipped to No. 24. Still, the series was doing well enough to be renewed for a third season. Ratings dipped even further in the third season due to repetitive story lines involving Martin's time machine, and the series was canceled.

== In other media ==
=== Animated series ===
My Favorite Martian
- Title card
- Voices of: Howard Morris; Jonathan Harris; Lane Scheimer; Jane Webb
- Country of origin: United States
- No. of seasons: 1
- No. of episodes: 16

Production
- Producers: Norm Prescott; Lou Scheimer
- Running time: 22–24 minutes
- Production company: Filmation

Original release
- Network: CBS
- Release: September 8 – December 22, 1973

Related
- My Favorite Martians

An animated series, My Favorite Martians, was made by Filmation and was broadcast as part of the Saturday morning programming on CBS from September 8, 1973, to December 22, 1973, for a total of sixteen episodes. The series features Tim, Martin, Mrs. Brown and Detective Brennan (Brennan is considerably different). To appeal to a younger audience, Uncle Martin is joined by his Martian nephew named Andromeda, nicknamed "Andy", who only has one antenna and thus lesser powers than Uncle Martin and did appear in one episode of the live-action series. The pair also have a Martian pet named Okey, a sort of bouncing sheepdog with antennae. Tim also had a niece of his own, named Katie, living with them. Brennan also had a teenage son named Brad living with him and a pet chimpanzee named Chump. None of the characters were voiced by the original actors; Bixby was at the time committed to his latest project, The Magician, and Walston tried to distance himself from the role. As a result, Jonathan Harris voiced Martin and Jane Webb voiced Mrs. Brown.

The cartoon utilized a number of scripts from what would have been season four of the live action show; as of early July 2013, Jack Chertok Television co-owned it, with the Chertok company retaining all merchandising rights to the show.

At least two VHS tape volumes were released of the cartoon series in 1989 by UAV. Distribution rights were held, as of April 2013, by Classic Media as part of their Filmation holdings.

==== Episodes ====
| No. | Title | Original release date |
|---|---|---|
| 1 | "Check-Up" | September 8, 1973 |
| 2 | "Life Style" | September 15, 1973 |
| 3 | "Home Schtick" | September 22, 1973 |
| 4 | "Wall to Wall Flower" | September 29, 1973 |
| 5 | "The Cleo Caper" | October 6, 1973 |
| 6 | "Robot Tailor" | October 13, 1973 |
| 7 | "Lonely Okie?" | October 20, 1973 |
| 8 | "Triple Trouble" | October 27, 1973 |
| 9 | "The Incredible Shrinking Ship" | November 3, 1973 |
| 10 | "My Favorite Neighbor" | November 10, 1973 |
| 11 | "Allergy" | November 17, 1973 |
| 12 | "Truant Teacher" | November 24, 1973 |
| 13 | "Love: Martian Style" | December 1, 1973 |
| 14 | "The Chump Who Cried Chimp" | December 8, 1973 |
| 15 | "Credibility Gap" | December 15, 1973 |
| 16 | "Garage Sale" | December 22, 1973 |

=== Feature film ===
The series was also remade as a feature film in 1999 starring Christopher Lloyd as the Martian and Jeff Daniels as Tim. This film was released and distributed by Walt Disney Pictures. Ray Walston was featured in the film (both Bill Bixby and Pamela Britton had since died; the former in 1993 and the latter in 1974) and played another Martian who had been trapped on Earth since the time of the first series and wore a similar space suit from the series; his cover was now that of a government investigator of unidentified flying objects. However, the premise was changed: Martians such as Lloyd's Uncle Martin are now non-humanoids with four arms, four legs, and three eyes who use a gumball (which they call "nerplex") to assume human form. The "nerplex" comes in a selection that will turn the person ingesting it into assorted life forms, including Martian, Venusian and one to "never use" (Venox 7).

=== Comics ===
The TV series was adapted into comic book form by Dan Spiegle and was distributed by Gold Key Comics. It lasted nine issues and ran from 1963 through 1966. Gerry Anderson's company Century 21 acquired the rights to produce a comic strip adaptation; it ran in their weekly newspaper, formatted comic TV21, for two years (1965–66) and was featured in three of the British Christmas comics annuals. Unlike the Gold Key Comics adaptation, the British strip, in its later run, featured Martin's nephew Andromeda. Due to a lack of reference he was depicted as a chubby freckled British schoolboy.

The comic rights returned to the Chertok company, who licensed a reprint of the Gold Key title produced by Hermes Press. Hermes Press put out one volume of a two volume set that covered issues #1-7 of the Gold Key series. The planned second would complete the Gold Key run and include the TV21 material. They also subsequently issued a special single issue edition reprint for the national free comic book day. That reprint is the only instance of a 1960s television comic reprint being used for this event. Subsequently, during the event, the books, in almost every venue, were the first to sell out. The Chertok Company is actively looking to reprint, for the first time, the British comic adaptation in a single, stand-alone volume. However, the TV21 Martian pages have been used as special features on the US DVD release of the TV series from MPI, for the Australian DVD release from Umbrella Entertainment, and more recently on the Australia New Zealand DVD release from Shock Entertainment.

=== Merchandising ===
During the show's initial run, several products were produced, resulting in a board game, a magic set, a paint by numbers set, and a springs with bells beanie hat.

Licensing resumed in 2012 on the My Favorite Martian property, resulting in both a scale plastic model kit of Uncle Martin's spaceship and a built up version, both from Pegasus Hobbies. Due to the success of the model kit, the Chertok company subsequently has extended the Pegasus license.

The Pegasus model kit is in fact a scale replica based on the Martian spaceship's appearance as seen in the series episode "Crash Diet", where the spaceship is shrunken down in size; the initial version of the shrunken spaceship is in the same scale used for the Pegasus model. A still of Uncle Martin holding that scaled space ship was placed on the back of the product carton for the assembled, non-kit spaceship.

An after-market photo-etched metal detail parts kit from the Paragrafix Company gives modelers the ability to seriously upgrade the model kit's cockpit detail. They also for the first time created a scale version of the time machine suitcase, along with offering Uncle Martin's flight log book reproduced in both English and Martian text.

Factory Entertainment produced a shake ems version of both Uncle Martin and his spaceship. They also offered a special edition black-and-white version of their Uncle Martin statue as a San Diego Comic-Con exclusive.

In 2015 Greenlight Collectibles produced a prototype My Favorite Martian boxed set featuring the second season's Plymouth Fury, as seen in the show.

In November 2017 Zynga Entertainment added My Favorite Martian to its cell phone game "Black Diamond Casino".

== See also ==
- 3rd Rock from the Sun
- ALF
- Marvin Marvin
- Mork & Mindy
- The Neighbors
