= Other Minds =

Other Minds may mean:

- Other Minds: The Octopus, the Sea, and the Deep Origins of Consciousness, a 2016 book on octopus intelligence by Peter Godfrey-Smith
- Other Minds (organization), a not-for-profit based in San Francisco

== See also ==
- Context as Other Minds, a 2005 book on human linguistic communication by Talmy Givón
- God and Other Minds, a 1967 book on the rationality of religious belief by Alvin Plantinga
- Problem of other minds, a longstanding open problem in philosophy
