= The Other One =

The Other One may refer to:

== Film ==
- La Otra (film), a 1945 Mexican drama film
- The Other One (film), a 2008 French drama film
- The Other One: The Long Strange Trip of Bob Weir, a 2015 American documentary
- The Witch: Part 2. The Other One, a 2022 South Korean science fiction action horror film

== Literature ==
- La Seconde, translated as The Other One, a 1929 novel by Colette
- The Other One, a novel by Catherine Turney, basis for the 1957 film Back from the Dead
- The Other One, a 1953 novel by Irene Mossop under the pen name Fay Chandos
- "The Other One", a 1959 novelette by Brian W. Aldiss
- "The Other One", a Kane short story by Karl Edward Wagner
- "The Other One", a 2012 short story by Evangeline Walton

== Music ==
- The Other One (Babymetal album), 2023
- The Other One (Bob Welch album), 1979
- "That's It for the Other One" or "The Other One", a song by the Grateful Dead, 1968

== Television ==
- The Other One (1977 TV series), a British sitcom starring Richard Briers and Michael Gambon
- The Other One (2017 TV series), a British sitcom starring Ellie White and Lauren Socha
- "The Other One" (Transformers: Cyberverse), a 2020 episode

== See also ==
- The Other Ones, an American rock band 1998–2002
- The Other Ones (Australian-German band), a pop rock band 1984–1990
- The Other Ones (novel), by Jean Thesman, 1999
