= Blondie (1957 TV series) =

- Genre: Sitcom
- Based on: Blondie comic strip by Chic Young
- Directed by: Abby Berlin; Paul Landres
- Starring: Pamela Britton; Arthur Lake
- Country of origin: United States
- Original language: English
- No. of seasons: 1
- No. of episodes: 26

Production
- Camera setup: Multi-camera
- Running time: 25 mins.
- Production companies: Hal Roach Studios; King Features Productions

Original release
- Network: NBC
- Release: January 4 – July 5, 1957

Related
- Blondie (comic strip); Blondie (1968 TV series)

Blondie is the first of two television series based on the comic strip by Chic Young. The show first aired on January 4, 1957, on NBC and ran for one season. Pamela Britton starred in the title role and Arthur Lake played Blondie's husband Dagwood Bumstead, reprising his role from the Blondie film series.

A pilot episode was filmed in 1954 with Hal Le Roy as Dagwood opposite Britton's Blondie. The series was released in its entirety on September 25, 2018, by ClassicFlix. As of 2024, it airs on Shout! TV.

== Cast ==
- Arthur Lake as Dagwood Bumstead
- Pamela Britton as Blondie Bumstead
- Florenz Ames as J.C. Dithers
- Ann Barnes as Cookie Bumstead
- Stuffy Singer as Alexander Bumstead
- Harold Peary as Herb Woodley
- Elvia Allman as Cora Dithers
- Lucien Littlefield as Mr. Beasley
- Hollis Irving as Mrs. Woodley

== Episodes ==
No.	Title	Directed by	Written by	Original release date
1	"Sudden Wealth"	Hal Yates	John L. Greene	January 4, 1957
2	"It's for the Birds"	Hal Yates	John L. Greene	January 11, 1957
3	"The Folks Who Came to Dinner"	Hal Yates	Warren Spector & Gordon T. Hughes	January 18, 1957
4	"The Other Woman"	Hal Yates	George Beck & Jo Conway	January 25, 1957
5	"Home Sweet Home"	Hal Yates	Jack Ellinson & Charles Stewart	February 1, 1957
6	"Get That Gun"	Hal Yates	Story by : Frank Gill, Jr. Teleplay by : George Carleton Brown	February 8, 1957
7	"The Feud"	Paul Landres	John L. Greene	February 15, 1957
8	"The Quiz Show"	Hal Yates	Charles Stewart & Jack Elinson	February 22, 1957
9	"Husbands Once Removed"	Hal Yates	John Fenton Murray	March 1, 1957
10	"The Payoff Money"	Paul Landres	George Beck & Jo Conway	March 8, 1957
11	"Hard Luck Idol"	Paul Landres	John L. Greene	March 15, 1957
12	"Oil for the Lamps of Blondie"	Hal Yates	Dick Mack & Harry Kronman	March 22, 1957
13	"Blondie the Breadwinner"	Les Goodwins	John Fenton Murray	March 29, 1957
14	"The Glamour Girl"	Paul Landres	John L. Greene	April 5, 1957
15	"The Rummage Sale"	Paul Landres	Jack Elinson & Charles Stewart	April 12, 1957
16	"Deception"	Paul Landres	Jay Sommers & Don Nelson	April 19, 1957
17	"Puppy Love"	Gerald Freedman	Frank Gill Jr. & George Carleton Brown	April 26, 1957
18	"Made to Fire"	Paul Landres	Gordon T. Hughes & Warren Spector	May 3, 1957
19	"Blondie Redecorates"	Paul Landres	John L. Greene	May 10, 1957
20	"Blondie's Double"	Paul Landres	Story by : John L. Greene; Teleplay by : Frank Fox & John L. Greene	May 17, 1957
21	"The Spy"	Paul Landres	John L. Greene	May 24, 1957
22	"Cupid's Question Column"	Paul Landres	John L. Greene	May 31, 1957
23	"The Tramp"	Paul Landres	John L. Greene	June 7, 1957
24	"Follow That Man"	Paul Landres	John L. Greene	June 14, 1957
25	"The Party"	Paul Landres	John L. Greene	June 21, 1957
26	"Howdy Neighbor"	Roger Kay	John Fenton Murray	June 28, 1957

== Production ==
William Harmon was the producer, Hal Yates was the director, and John L. Greene was the director. The show was a Hal Roach Jr. production. Toni and Nestle sponsored it on alternate weeks. It was broadcast on Fridays from 8 to 8:30 p.m. Eastern Time.

== Critical response ==
A review in the trade publication Variety found little to like in the premiere episode. It said that the TV adaptation "adds no new dimensions, either in wit or humor, to the comic strip." In contrast, it added, "the comic strip humor is diluted, the cliched lines and situations standing out like sore thumbs."
