= Tim Tyler's Luck =

American comic strip by Lyman Young

Lyman Young's Tim Tyler's Luck (March 23, 1959)

Tim Tyler's Luck is an adventure comic strip created by Lyman Young, elder brother of Blondie creator Chic Young. Distributed by King Features Syndicate, the strip ran from August 13, 1928, until August 24, 1996.

== Characters and story ==
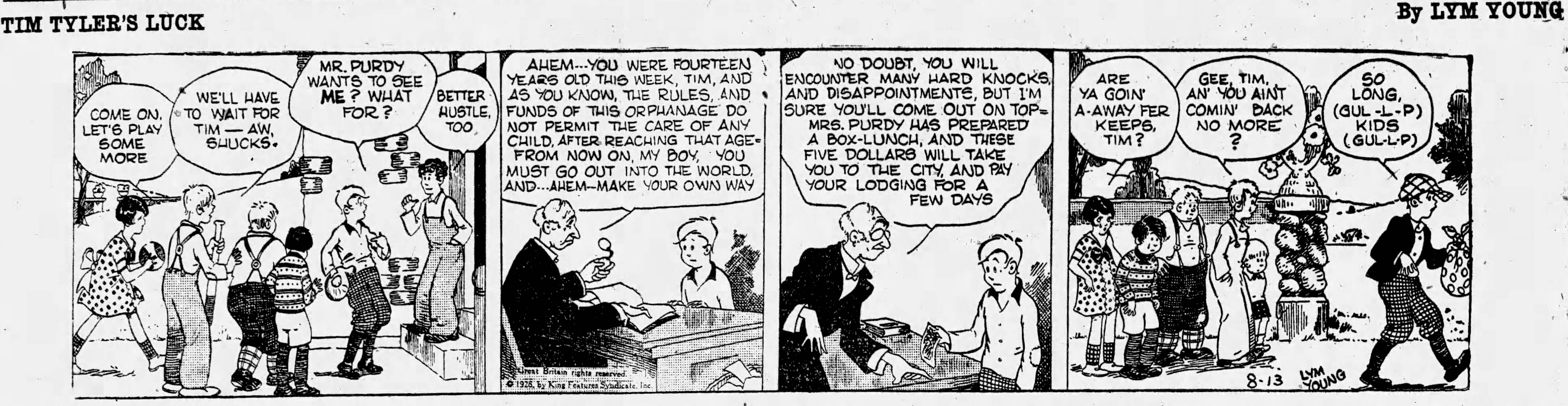
The debut comic strip, August 13, 1928

When Tim Tyler's Luck started in 1928, Tyler was living in an orphanage. However, he soon left the orphanage for the outside world. When he teamed with an older sidekick, Spud, they began globe-trotting for a series of international adventures. Many tales took place in Africa, as noted by comic strip historian Don Markstein:

By the time the Sunday version started (July 19, 1931), Tim and Spud were well away from the orphanage, living a life of adventure. At first, their adventures tended to be light and cartoony, but later, with Buck Rogers, Dick Tracy and the like gaining popularity, the strip took a more serious turn. Tim and Spud traveled the world before settling for several years in Africa, where (having grown into their late teens or so) they joined the Ivory Patrol and spent their time chasing after poachers and the like. They returned to America during World War II, where they mostly dealt with spies and saboteurs. Afterward, they went traveling again, eventually returning to Africa, where they remained for good.

== Illustrators ==
Starting March 31, 1935, Young added a topper strip, Curley Harper; it ran until January 14, 1945, and sometimes appeared separately.

Young employed several artists, some of whom became famous and successful with their own strips. The illustrators included Alex Raymond, Burne Hogarth, Clark Haas, Tony DiPreta, Nat Edson and Tom Massey.

In 1972, Young's son, Bob Young, began sharing credit with his father, and after Lyman Young's death in 1984, Bob completely took over the strip. Tim Tyler's Luck slowly faded away, and by the time it was canceled in 1996, it was being carried by only a single paper.

=== Reprints ===
In 2016, The Library of American Comics reprinted one year of the strip (1933) as an installment in its LoAC Essentials line.

== Film ==

In 1937, a 12-chapter movie serial starred Frankie Thomas as Tim Tyler.

The title of the Umberto Eco novel The Mysterious Flame of Queen Loana (2004) is taken from the title of a strip episode, in turn inspired by H. Rider Haggard's novel She.
