= Dagwood sandwich =

Tall, multilayered sandwich

- Dagwood Bumstead holding a Dagwood sandwich in a handscrew clamp
- Type: Sandwich
- Main ingredients: Bread, meats, cheeses, condiments

A Dagwood sandwich is a tall, multilayered sandwich made with a variety of meats, cheeses, and condiments. It is named after Dagwood Bumstead, a central character in the comic strip Blondie, who is frequently illustrated making enormous sandwiches. According to Blondie scripter Dean Young, his father, Chic Young, began drawing the huge sandwiches in the comic strip in 1936.

== Ingredients ==
A Blondie comic strip depicting a Dagwood sandwich

Though the contents of Chic Young's illustrated Dagwood sandwich remain obscure, it appears to contain large quantities and varieties of cold cuts, sliced cheese and vegetables separated by additional slices of bread. A small fish, presumably a sardine, is usually visible. An olive pierced by a toothpick or wooden skewer usually crowns the edible structure. "Dagwood sandwich" has been included in Webster's New World Dictionary and "Dagwood" (referring to the sandwich) has been included in The American Heritage Dictionary of the English Language.

== Products and restaurants ==
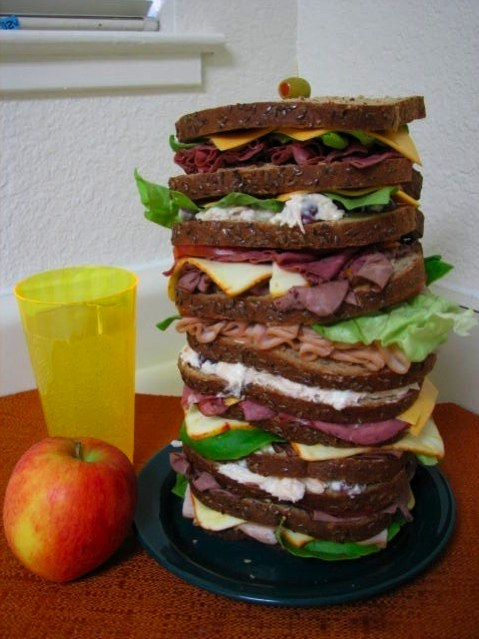
A real-world realization of the Dagwood sandwich concept

- In 1951, businessmen Bob Weiler and Art Lang opened a Dagwood-themed restaurant in Toledo, Ohio, with hopes of establishing a national chain. They had not licensed the Dagwood name and were ordered to stop using it by King Features.
- A Dagwood Diner (spelled "Dag-Wood") operated in Ann Arbor, Michigan, until 1971.
- Assorted lunch meats featuring Dagwood have been sold at grocery stores. In May 1999, a counter-service restaurant named Blondie's opened at Universal Islands of Adventure, serving a traditional Dagwood-style sandwich. Blondie's bills itself as "Home of the Dagwood Sandwich". The exterior displays a 20-foot plastic Dagwood sandwich over the entrance.
- Denny's offered their breakfast Dagwood in the early 2000s and it contained over a thousand calories. It was later removed from their menu.
- Dagwood's Sandwich Shoppes, a Blondie-themed restaurant chain founded in 2006, had franchise locations open in Florida, Kentucky, Indiana, Missouri, and Georgia that have all closed as of 2011. The chain struggled financially and never reached the growth anticipated by its founders. Two lawsuits were filed alleging mismanagement, fraud, embezzlement, and deliberate deception of the chain's financial state as it collapsed. The Dagwood was sold as a 1.5-pound (680 g) sandwich. The Dagwood sandwich served in the Dagwood Sandwich Shoppes included the following ingredients: three slices of deli bread, Genoa salami, ham, pepperoni, turkey, cheddar cheese, provolone, lettuce, tomato, roasted red bell peppers, banana peppers, red onion, deli mustard, and low-calorie mayonnaise.
- Cincinnati-based chain Penn Station refers to its "create-it-yourself" submarine sandwich as a Dagwood. A customer may include up to five meats, and any combination of available condiments and vegetables.
- Dagwoods are also a popular sandwich in South African takeaway (fast-food) restaurants and roadhouses, both in small street-side stands and larger chains. A South African Dagwood is usually made with three slices of toasted bread with a hamburger patty (or two), along with lettuce, tomato, and a fried egg. Other common accoutrements may be added and the beef patty may be replaced by savory mince reminiscent of an American sloppy joe, but it seems to be the fried egg and double-decker nature of the sandwich that characterizes a South African Dagwood.
- In 2008, Man v. Food host Adam Richman visited Columbus, Ohio, and took part in the Ohio Deli and Restaurant's Dagwood Challenge. The challenge was to eat a 2-1/2-pound Dagwood sandwich, plus a full pound of French fries, within 30 minutes. Richman successfully ate the sandwich and fries in 20 of the 30 minutes and was awarded a commemorative T-shirt.
- Dagwood's Deli and Sub Shop opened in Indiana in 1985, now serving several locations. On the menu is a "Dagwood Supreme", which includes roast beef, ham, turkey, provolone and Colby cheeses, lettuce, tomato, and onions and a "Dagwood" sauce.
- Dagwoods Sandwichs et Salades is a fast-food chain operating in Canada. It was founded in 1989 in Montreal but subsequently expanded throughout Quebec and into Eastern Ontario.
- Canadian supermarket chain Sobeys sells an in-store made Dagwood sandwich, but this version does not look like the multi-layered sandwiches from the comic; instead, it resembles a thick submarine sandwich.

== See also ==
- Caspar Milquetoast
- Dream of the Rarebit Fiend
- J. Wellington Wimpy
- Jiggs dinner
- Torta del Chavo
- List of American sandwiches
- List of sandwiches
- Sandwich loaf, a type of party food made from a whole loaf of bread
- Shaggy Rogers
