= Denis Lebrun =

American cartoonist

Denis Lebrun (born April 30, 1958) is a comic strip artist best known for his collaboration with Dean Young on the Blondie comic strip.

== Comic strips ==
Born in Springfield, Massachusetts, Lebrun entered the comic strip field in 1975 with Rolling with Roger in the Tampa Neighbor newspaper. In 1976, Lebrun had a daily strip, Aw Heck, in the Tampa Times until 1979. Aw Heck then appeared in the Clearwater Sun from 1979 until 1980.

== Blondie ==
Lebrun originally assisted on the King Features Syndicate comic strip Blondie as early as 1977, furnishing the strip's owner Dean Young with gag scripts.

In 1982, Lebrun became Blondie's assistant illustrator to head artist Mike Gersher. In this capacity, Lebrun inked the lettering, backgrounds and incidental and secondary characters of the strip. Gersher left the strip in 1984 and was replaced that same year with veteran comic strip illustrator Stan Drake. Drake was the head artist of the strip until his death in 1997. Cartoonist Jeff Parker assisted with the production of the daily strip from 1996 until Lebrun's departure.

In May 1997, Lebrun took over full artistic responsibilities of the strip and was the lead artist until 2005. His final illustrations appeared in the Sunday, July 31, 2005 edition of the strip. The last Lebrun signature was on the September 3, 2005 strip According to comics historian R. C. Harvey, Lebrun was succeeded by John Marshall, although Marshall remained uncredited until Sunday, January 7, 2007. Marshall had been assisting Lebrun and Jeff Parker on the daily Blondie since December 2002.

== Digital Dagwood ==
During his tenure with Blondie, Lebrun introduced changes to the appearance and production of the strip. Almost immediately after taking the helm, Lebrun began to modernize it by updating Dagwood's wardrobe, replacing dial phones with touch-tone phones, adding computer terminals to Dagwood's place of work and replacing paper charts with digital presentations. In spite of these changes, Lebrun kept the appearance of the strip close to the style of previous Blondie veteran artist Jim Raymond.

As early as 1985, Lebrun began to use the computer as a means to streamline and modernize production. Originally, he employed the conventional tools and materials used by earlier Blondie artists: steel pen points (originally Gillot 1290s, later Hunt 103 or 104s for the line work and filed-down Speedball A-2s for lettering), Strathmore two-ply plate finish paper and Pelikan drawing ink. By January 2002, Lebrun made the strip's production fully digital, abandoning paper, pencil and ink in favor of the PowerPC G4.
