= Tim Tyler's Luck (serial) =

- Directed by: Ford Beebe; Wyndham Gittens
- Written by: Wyndham Gittens; Norman S. Hall; Ray Trampe; Lyman Young
- Produced by: Henry MacRae; Elmer Tambert (associate)
- Starring: Frankie Thomas; Frances Robinson; Jack Mulhall; Al Shean; Norman Willis
- Cinematography: Jerome Ash
- Edited by: Saul A. Goodkind (supervisor); Joseph Gluck; Louis Sackin; Alvin Todd
- Music by: William Schiller; Clifford Vaughan
- Distributed by: Universal Pictures
- Release date: December 27, 1937
- Running time: 12 chapters (212 minutes)
- Country: United States
- Language: English

Tim Tyler's Luck (1937) is a Universal movie serial based on the comic strip Tim Tyler's Luck.

== Premise ==
Tim Tyler stows away on a ship bound for Africa to find his father, Professor James Tyler. He meets, and is joined by, Lora Lacey, who is chasing the criminal "Spider" Webb, the man responsible for framing her brother.

== Cast ==
- Frankie Thomas as Tim Tyler
- Frances Robinson as Lora Lacey, posing as Lora Graham
- Norman Willis as "Spider" Webb
- Jack Mulhall as Sargeant Gates
- Al Shean as Professor James Tyler, Tim's father
- Anthony Warde as Garry Drake
- Earl Douglas as Jules Lazarre
- William 'Billy' Benedict as Spud
- Frank Mayo as Jim Conway
- Alan Gregg as Brent, one of Spider's henchman
- Stanley Blystone as Captain Clark
- Everett Brown as Mogu, Spider's native henchman
- Skippy as Ju Ju, the Chimp

== Critical reception ==
Author Raymond William Stedman considers Tim Tyler's Luck to be perhaps the best of Universal's "Jungle Thrillers." Tim Tyler's Luck has good direction and convincing performances. The serial has quiet moments balancing the action, which was rare for a serial. The characterization is more nuanced than "might have been expected in an action serial".

== Chapter titles ==
1. Jungle Pirates
2. Dead Man's Pass
3. Into the Lions' Den
4. The Ivory Trail
5. Trapped in the Quicksands
6. The Jaws of the Jungle
7. The King of the Gorillas
8. The Spider Caught
9. The Gates of Doom
10. A Race for a Fortune
11. No Man's Land
12. The Kimberley Diamonds

_{Source:}

== Home media ==
All 12 chapters were released on a single DVD on February 28, 2006 with special features including a 2005 interview with Frankie Thomas, bios, the original theatrical trailer, and bonus classic cliffhanger trailers.

== See also ==
- List of film serials
- List of film serials by studio

Preceded by Radio Patrol (1937)	Universal Serial; Tim Tyler's Luck (1937)	Succeeded by Flash Gordon's Trip to Mars (1938)
