= Lyman Young =

American cartoonist (1893–1984)

- Born: October 20, 1893
- Died: February 12, 1984 (aged 90)
- Occupation: Cartoonist
- Known for: Tim Tyler's Luck
- Relatives: Chic Young (brother); Dean Young (nephew)

Lyman W. Young (October 20, 1893 – February 12, 1984) was an American cartoonist who created the strip Tim Tyler's Luck. His younger brother, Chic Young, was the creator of Blondie.

Like his brother, Lyman Young was encouraged to do artwork by his mother, who was a painter. After Young studied at the Chicago Art Institute and served in World War I, he worked as a salesman. He began his career as a cartoonist in 1924 by stepping in to draw C. W. Kahles' comic strip The Kelly Kids. In 1927, he created his own strip, The Kid Sister, a spin-off of The Kelly Kids.

== Tim Tyler's Luck ==
Young launched Tim Tyler's Luck in 1928, and in 1935, he added a topper strip Curley Harper. Young employed several artists, some of whom became famous and successful with their own strips. The illustrators included Alex Raymond, Burne Hogarth, Clark Haas, Nat Edson and Tom Massey. Tony DiPreta began his career doing lettering on the strip.

Young lived in Greenwich, Connecticut. During the 1950s, when his son Bob took over the daily strip, Young retired to Florida, where he lived near his brother, and then relocated to California. He was 90 when he died in 1984.

== Awards ==
He received the National Cartoonists Society's Silver T-Square Award in 1977.
