= Loaf =

Usually rounded mass of food

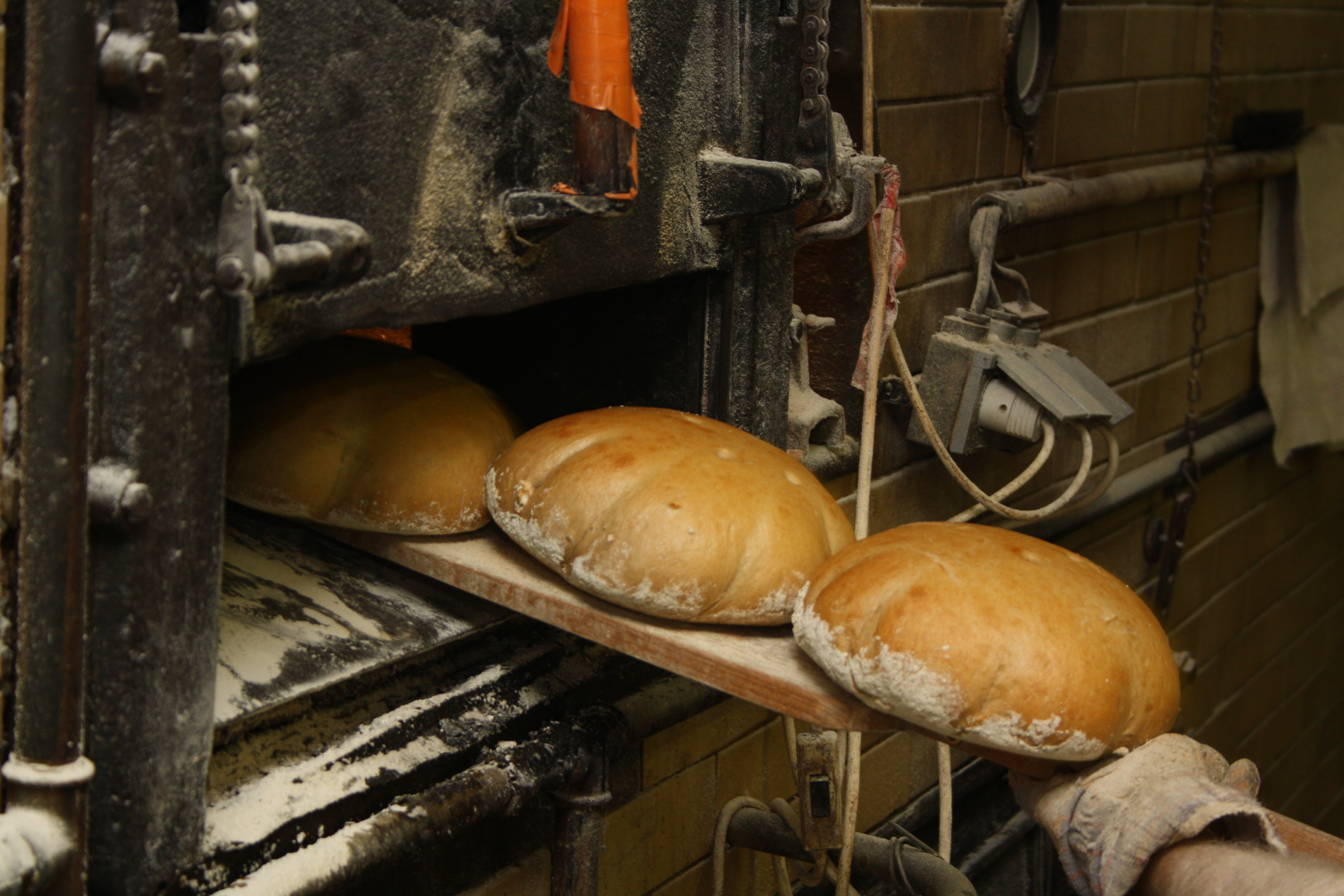
A baker takes round loaves of fresh bread out of the oven with a peel

A loaf (pl.: loaves) is a (usually) rounded or oblong quantity of food, typically and originally of bread. It is common to bake bread in a rectangular bread pan or loaf pan because some kinds of bread dough tend to collapse and spread out during the cooking process if not constrained; the shape of less viscous doughs can be maintained with a bread pan whose sides are higher than the uncooked dough. More viscous doughs can be hand-moulded into the desired loaf shape and cooked on a flat oven tray.

The same principle applies to non-bread products such as meatloaf and cakes that are cooked so as to retain their shape during the cooking process. In determining the size of the loaf, the cook or baker must take into consideration the need for heat to penetrate the loaf evenly during the cooking process, so that no parts are overcooked or undercooked. Many kinds of mass-produced bread are distinctly squared, with well-defined corners on the bottom of the loaf. Loaves of rectangular shape can be made more or less identical, and can be packed and shipped efficiently.

== Etymology ==
The modern English word loaf is derived from Old English hlaf, 'bread', which in turn is from Proto-Germanic *khlaibuz. Old Norse hleifr, Swedish lev, Old Frisian hlef, Gothic hlaifs, Old High German hleib and modern German Laib derive from this Proto-Germanic word, which was also borrowed into Slavic (Polish chleb, Russian khleb) and Finnic (Finnish leipä, Estonian leib) languages as well.

== See also ==
- Cottage loaf, an English double-decker loaf of bread
- Malt loaf, a sweet dark bread, sometimes with fruit
- Meatloaf, a meat dish shaped in the form of a loaf
- Nutraloaf, a type of food served in some US prisons
- Sugarloaf, a solid form of refined sugar
- Sandwich loaf, a layer-cake like party dish, made from a loaf of bread with savory fillings.
- Zwieback
- Japanese milk bread
- Tiger bread
- Catloaf, or a way a cat sits in a way somewhat similar to a loaf
