= Dean Young (cartoonist) =

American cartoonist ("Blondie"), born 1938

- Born: Dean Wayne Young; July 2, 1938 (age 88)
- Occupation: Cartoonist
- Years active: 1970s–present
- Known for: Blondie
- Father: Chic Young
- Relatives: Lyman Young (uncle)

Dean Wayne Young (born July 2, 1938) is the head writer of the comic strip Blondie, which he inherited from his father Chic Young, who died in 1973.

Since then, Dean Young has collaborated on Blondie with several artists: Jim Raymond (1973–1981), Mike Gersher (1981–1984), Stan Drake (1984–1997) and Denis Lebrun (1997–2005). Since 2005, Blondie is drawn by John Marshall, who worked with his assistant Frank Cummings until the latter's death in 2014.

In 1986, Young talked about his gag situations, his approach to the characters of Blondie and Dagwood and satisfying his readers. He also explained how he could be in Vermont or Florida and collaborate with Stan Drake at his studio in Westport, Connecticut:

"I like to deal mainly with domestic situations, and I primarily stick with eating, sleeping, raising children and making money. These days I often do ideas that will appeal to more feminist-type women. I don't want Blondie just to be stuck at home with gags involving her to be limited to that setting alone. I want Blondie to be a complete woman, and I want readers to respect her not only for her ability to maintain a home, but also for her own mind and her own person. If readers admire a character's personality and the way he or she is, they have affection and love for the character... A lot of the changes in the way he [Dagwood] acts nowadays have to do with his relationships to women. I'm careful to see that he doesn't do things that might make a segment of women readers unhappy or upset... I don't want to make any group or persons unhappy with the way the Blondie characters behave. This was my dad's formula, and the advice he passed on to me in this connection has worked very well...".

As of 2021, Young and his wife Charlotte make their home in Belleair, Florida.
