= Torta del Chavo =

Egg sandwich

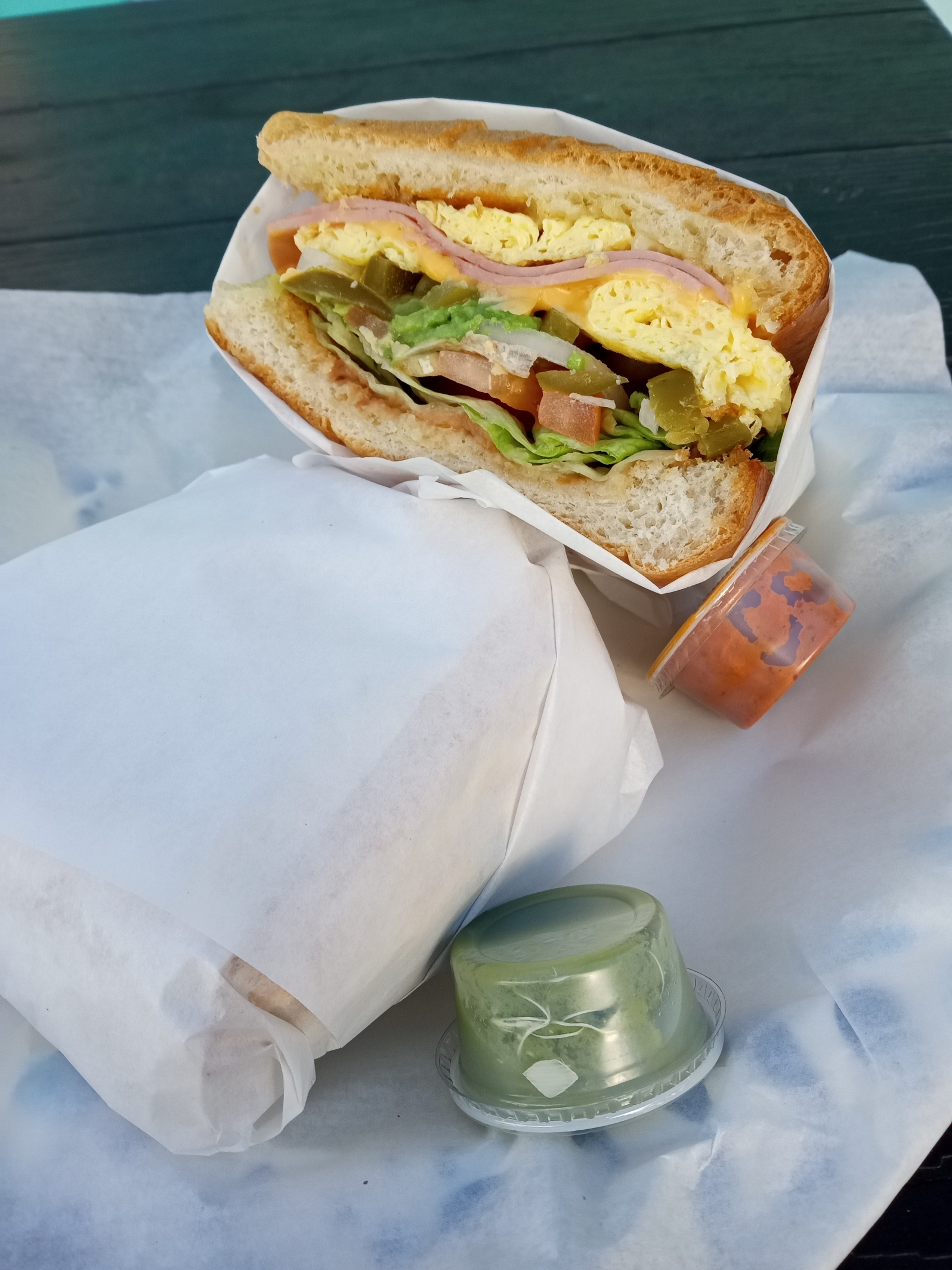
- a Torta del Chavo containing eggs, and avocado and refried beans
- Place of origin: Mexico
- Main ingredients: Tortillas, chili pepper sauce, meat

A Torta del Chavo is a Mexican sandwich made with bread (usually a telera, but can also be made with bolillo, with birote or baguette) which is split in half and filled with ham and other ingredients. Tortas can be served hot or cold.

== Origin ==
The "torta del Chavo" is a variation of the traditional Mexican "torta" sandwich, made famous by the character "El Chavo del Ocho" from the popular Mexican sitcom, where he is often depicted craving and trying to get tortas; essentially, the "torta del Chavo" is a simple ham and cheese sandwich on bolillo bread, popularized by the show's widespread recognition, making it a well-known and beloved food item in Mexican culture.

Like most Mexican tortas, the torta del Chavo has its origins in Spanish cakes. In Spain, a torta cake is a type of round, flat bread (wider than it is tall), which was prepared in a different way in each town or region. In some, they were drizzled with olive oil, leaving a bread with a golden, shiny crust (see oil cakes). In others, they were seasoned with sesame seeds, or filled with different meats or vegetables.

== Ingredients ==
Tortas del Chavo are usually seasoned with mayonnaise, avocado, refried beans, and some type of chili pepper, or a combination of chilis, such as jalapeño chile and chipotle. Many other condiments are also popular.

== See also ==
- Empalme
- Enchirito
- Mexican cuisine
- New Mexican cuisine
- Tex-Mex cuisine
- List of Mexican dishes
- Dagwood sandwich
