= Sandwich loaf =

North American dish

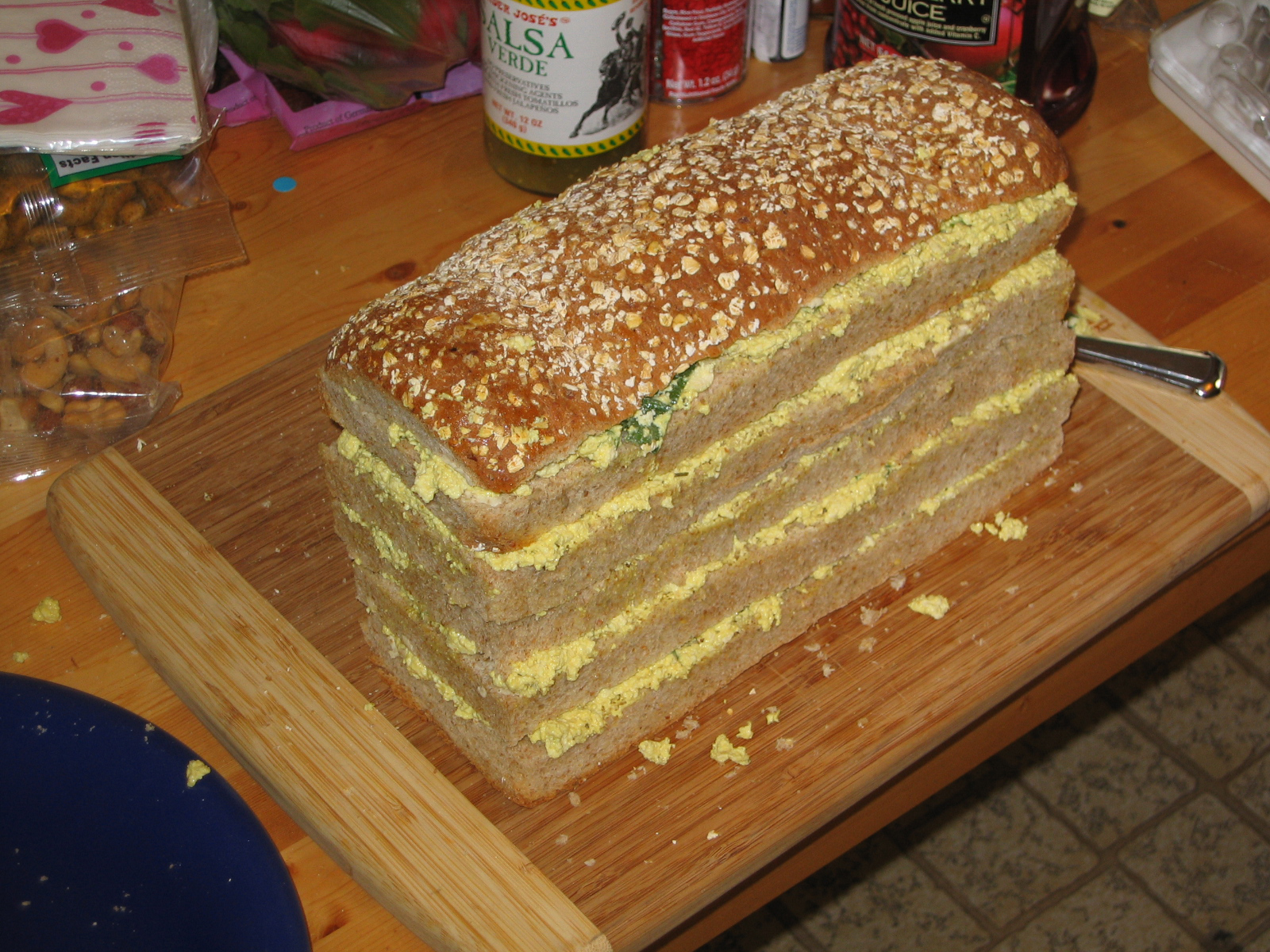
- Sandwich loaf before frosting
- Type: Sandwich
- Course: Entrée
- Main ingredients: White bread, filling

A sandwich loaf is a stacked savory party entrée made from a loaf of horizontally sliced bread. Typical fillings include egg salad, chicken salad, ham salad, tuna salad, and Cheez Whiz. While rare today, the dish was quite popular during the mid-20th century in the United States.

== History ==
Sandwich loaf was mentioned as early as 1935: "[...] giving the fork a chance for active play, the sandwich loaf made its appearance. This loaf, as you all must know by now, is a delicate triple-layered affair generously frosted with creamy cheese."

Sandwich Loaf is still common enough to be served in restaurants near the US/Mexico border where the dish is called sandwhichon. This variation is garnished with pineapple, cherries, pickled jalapenos and pecans, and visually resembles a traditional tres leches cake.

It remains popular in parts of French Canada (Quebec, New Brunswick) by the name pain sandwich (bread sandwich).

== Preparation ==
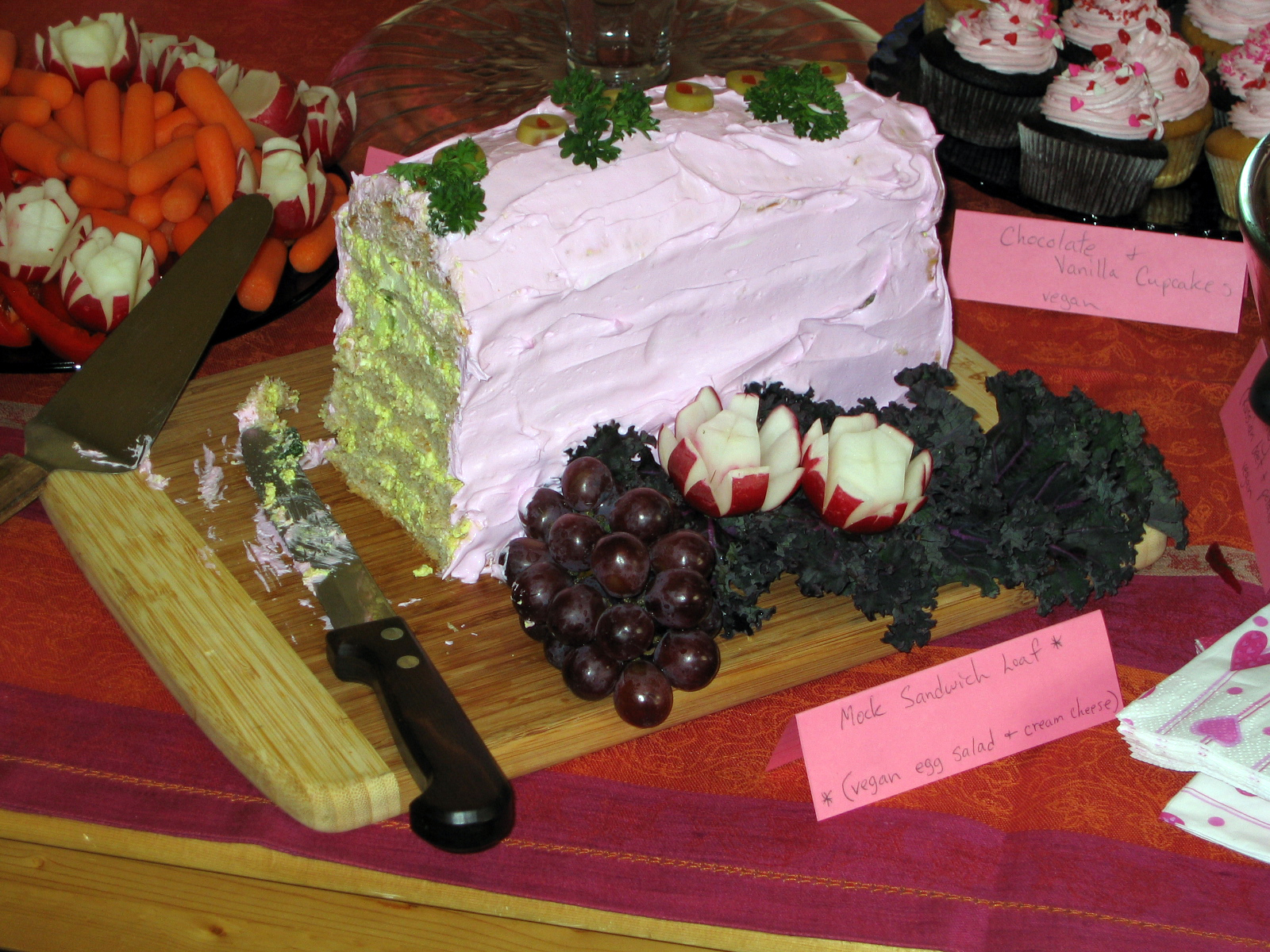
Frosted sandwich loaf

To create a sandwich loaf, bread is cut horizontally and spread with layers of filling. Common fillings include egg salad, chicken salad, ham salad, tuna salad, and Cheez Whiz. In a simple sandwich loaf, the fillings may all be the same, but in more complex creations each layer is different.

White bread is usually used to create a sandwich loaf, but whole wheat is also used. Sometimes white and whole wheat are used in alternating layers to create a ribbon effect. Common garnishes are olives, parsley, grapes, and carrot curls. The loaf is sliced like a cake and eaten with a fork.

== See also ==
- Dagwood sandwich, a tall stacked sandwich
- Sandwich
- Smörgåstårta
- Dressed herring
- Bunny chow
- List of American sandwiches
- List of sandwiches
