= Stan Drake =

American cartoonist

- Stan Drake inking a strip
- Born: November 9, 1921; Brooklyn, New York, U.S.
- Died: March 10, 1997 (aged 75); Norwalk, Connecticut, U.S.
- Occupation: Cartoonist

Stanley Albert Drake (November 9, 1921 – March 10, 1997) was an American cartoonist best known as the founding artist of the comic strip The Heart of Juliet Jones.

Born in Brooklyn, Drake worked in the back of a Dugan's Donut truck for a dollar-a-day salary while he was in high school. At the age of 17, he contributed art to Popular Detective, Popular Sports and other pulps. Entering the comic book field as artist, letterer and writer, he became friends with cartoonist Bob Lubbers, who later suggested he draw newspaper comics.

He studied for two years at New York's Art Students League. In the Pacific theater during World War II, he did public relations work for Stars and Stripes. Returning to civilian life, he went into advertising, eventually heading a studio of 12 illustrators.

== Comic strips ==
Juliet Jones, created in 1953 by Drake and writer Elliot Caplin, was a dramatic comic drawn by Drake in a naturalistic style. Drake, whose assistants included Tex Blaisdell and Frank McLaughlin, stayed on the strip until 1989, when he was succeeded by Frank Bolle. Comic strip artist Larry Lieber has said Drake was the biggest influence on his work.

In 1984, Drake replaced Mike Gersher as the artist on Blondie (written by Dean Young), and he continued drawing the strip until his death. His assistant on Blondie was Denis Lebrun.

== Fine art ==
He was a prolific painter and created portraits of more than 40 cartoonists, work displayed at the Comic Artist's Museum in Sarasota, Florida.

== Graphic novels ==
Drake drew comic books for Marvel Comics such as The Pitt. Internationally, he is known for the artwork on the Kelly Green series of graphic novels about a young widow who fights crime in the manner of an action hero. This series was written by Leonard Starr. It was serialized in Pilote magazine in black and white before being collected in color albums by the French firm Dargaud International Publishing. An avid golfer, Drake created illustrations for Golf Digest and the book The Touch System for Better Golf.

== Awards ==
He was recognized by the National Cartoonists Society with their Story Comic Strip Award (1969, 1970, 1972) for The Heart of Juliet Jones, and was awarded the Inkpot Award in 1984.

== Health ==
Drake was a passenger during the September 6, 1956 automobile accident that killed his fellow cartoonist Alex Raymond, and was badly injured, with a broken shoulder which stopped him from cartooning during his recovery, and both his ears having been ripped off and needing to be surgically reattached. As well, Drake had a congenital condition such that the bones of his skull did not properly fuse in infancy.
