= Smörgåstårta =

Savory cake of Swedish origin

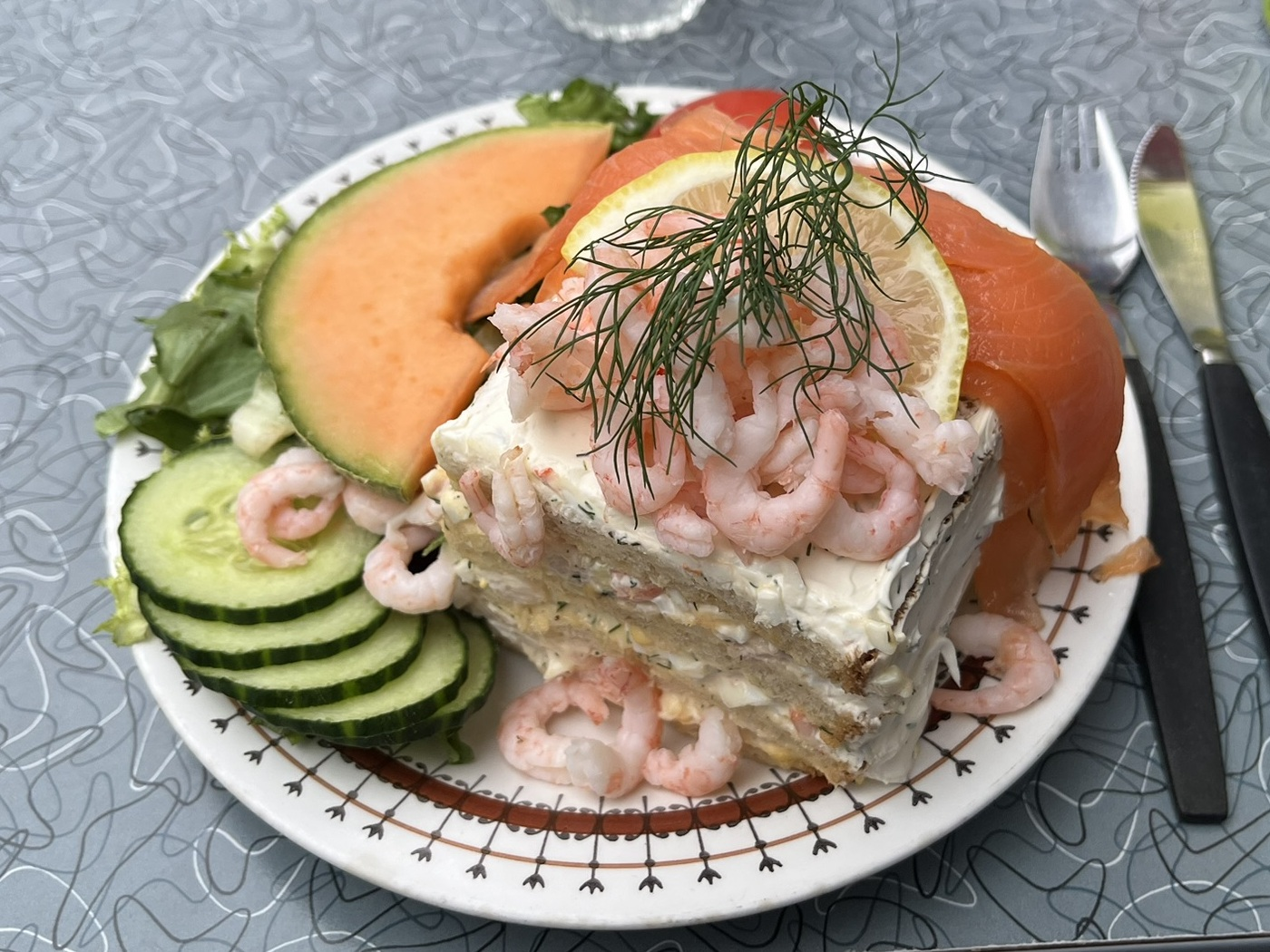
- A plate of smörgåstårta
- Type: Festive
- Course: Main
- Place of origin: Sweden
- Region or state: Northern Europe
- Serving temperature: Cold
- Main ingredients: White or light rye bread, egg or mayonnaise base, fillings

Smörgåstårta (Swedish for lit. 'sandwich-torte'), or sandwich cake (Finnish: voileipäkakku; Estonian: võileivatort; Icelandic: brauðterta), is a savoury main dish, not a dessert, of Swedish origin, popular in Sweden, Finland, Estonia, and Iceland, etc. The name is quite literal, with the dish consisting of a cake-like dish, mainly festive, but composed of layers of bread bound with large amounts of sandwich filling and garnish, structurally similar to a layered cream cake, but culinarily more in line with Toast Skagen. When eaten, it is sliced and served like any other cake.

== Preparation and serving ==
A smörgåstårta is typically made up of several layers of white or light rye bread (albeit dark bread also appear) with creamy fillings in between. The fillings and toppings vary, and may be lunch meat, smoked, graved, or pickled fish (especially smoked salmon), shellfish (especially shrimp and shrimp salad), caviar (or 'caviar cream'), cheeses, liver pâté, cream salads (like mimosa salad), and sliced vegetables, but egg, mayonnaise, and sourcream/crème fraîche are often the base. Even vegan variants occur. The top garnish often reflects the main ingredients used as a filling.

Smörgåstårta is served cold and cut like a dessert cake. It is commonly served at family gatherings such as birthday parties, weddings, or funerals, etc.

== Gallery ==
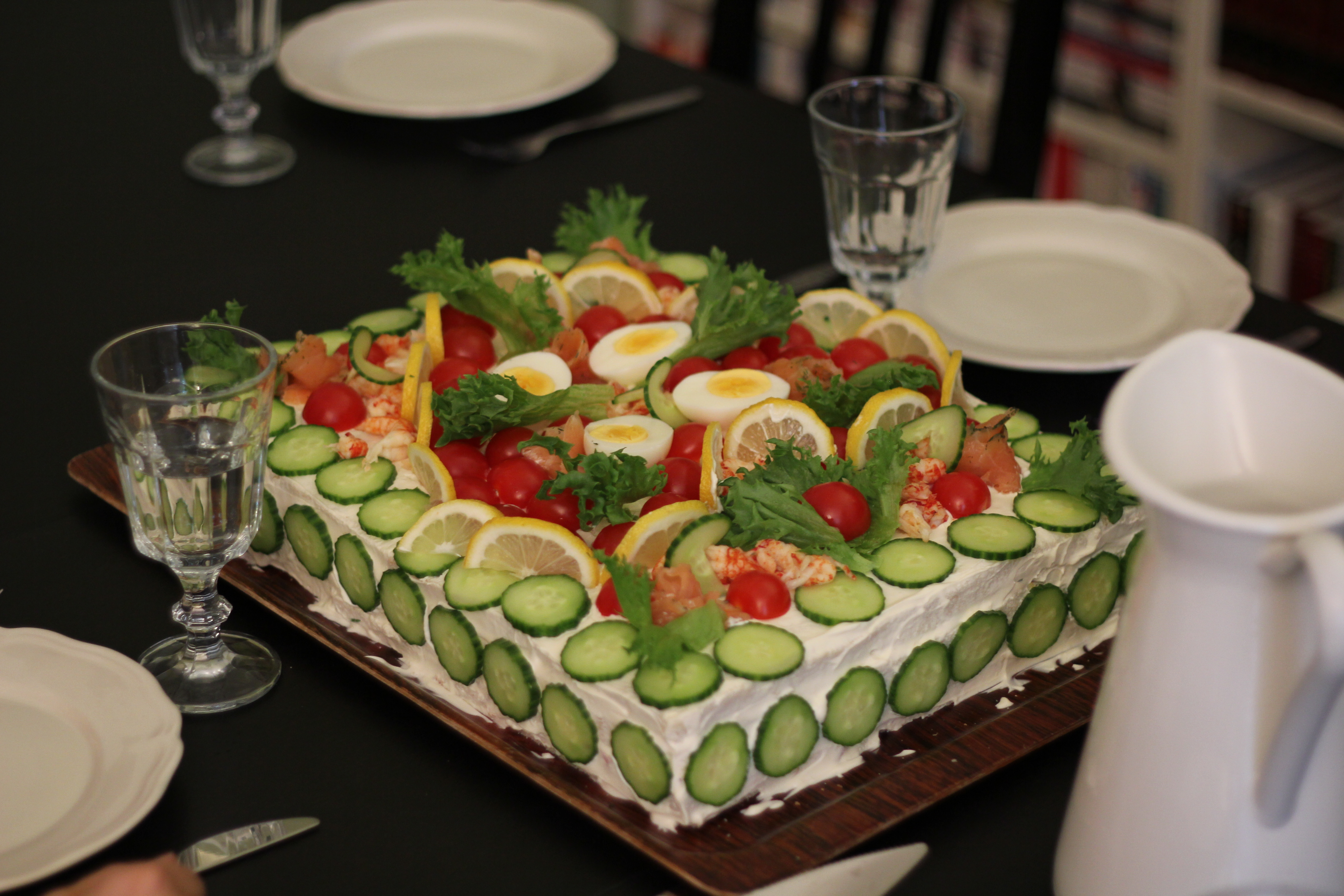
A square smörgåstårta

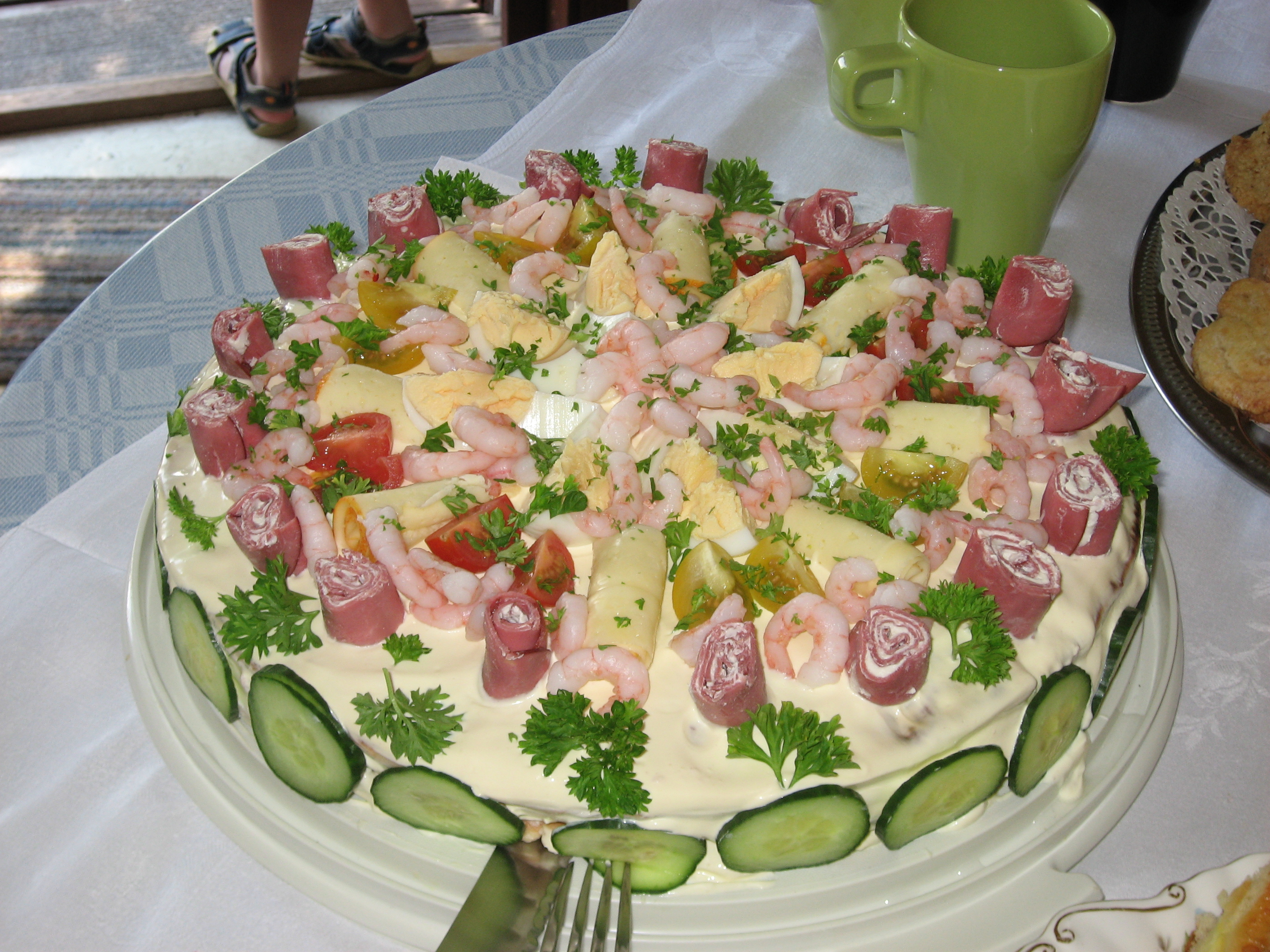
A round smörgåstårta

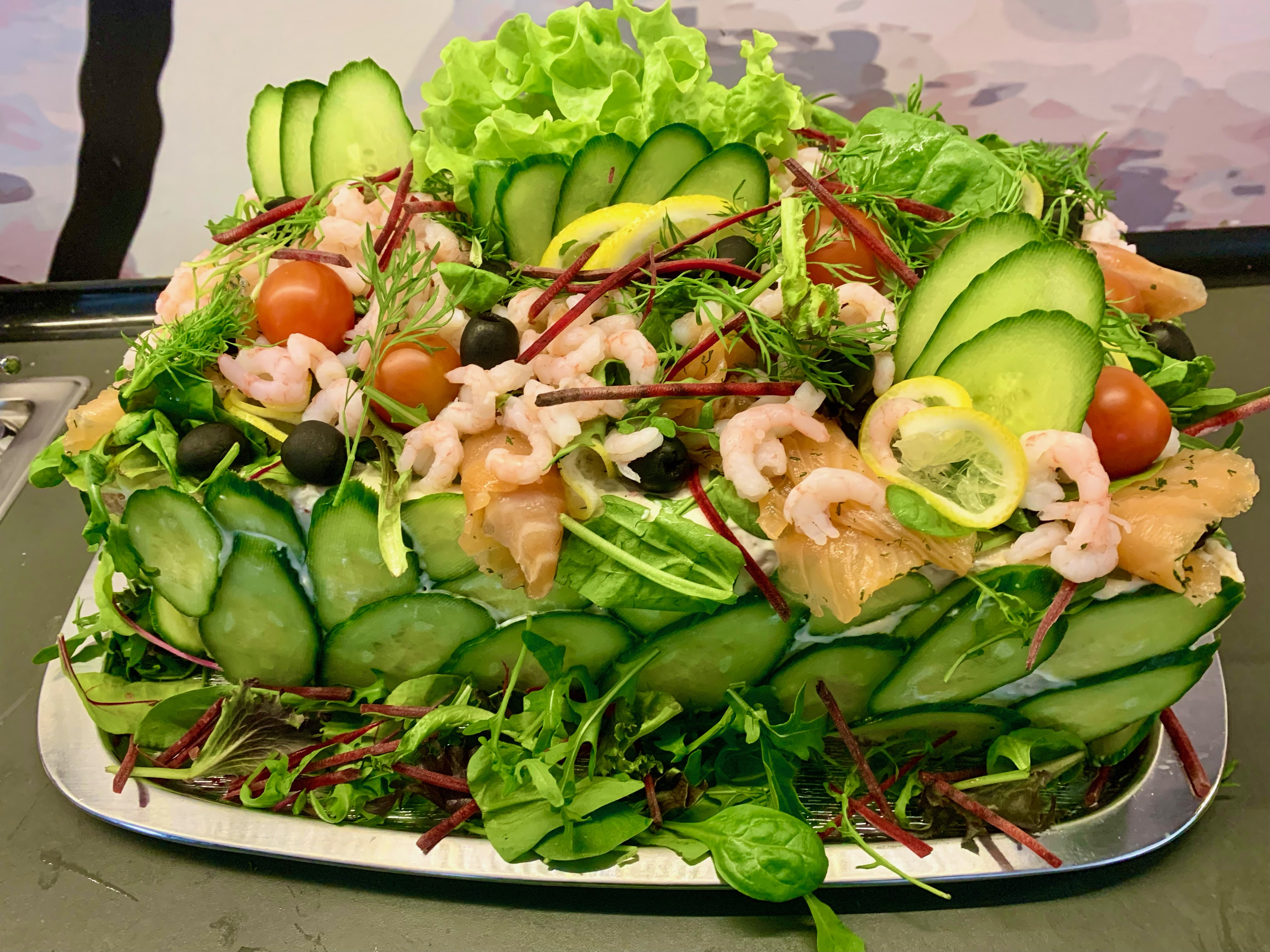
Heavily sallad garnished smörgåstårta

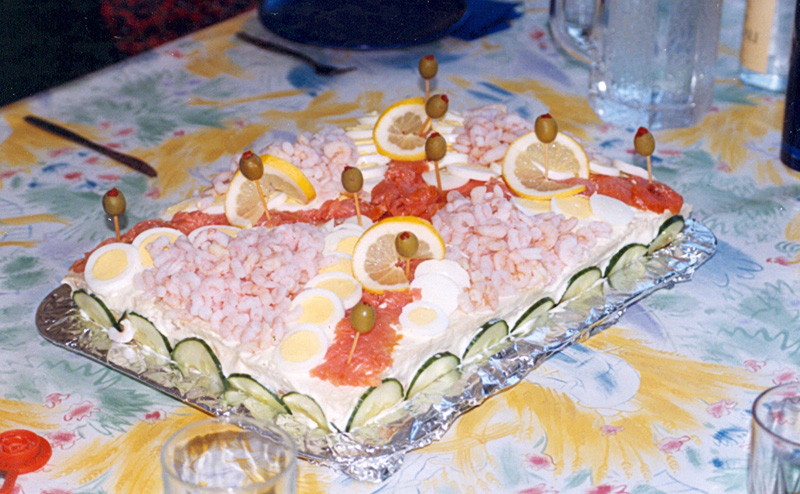
Heavily seafood garnished smörgåstårta

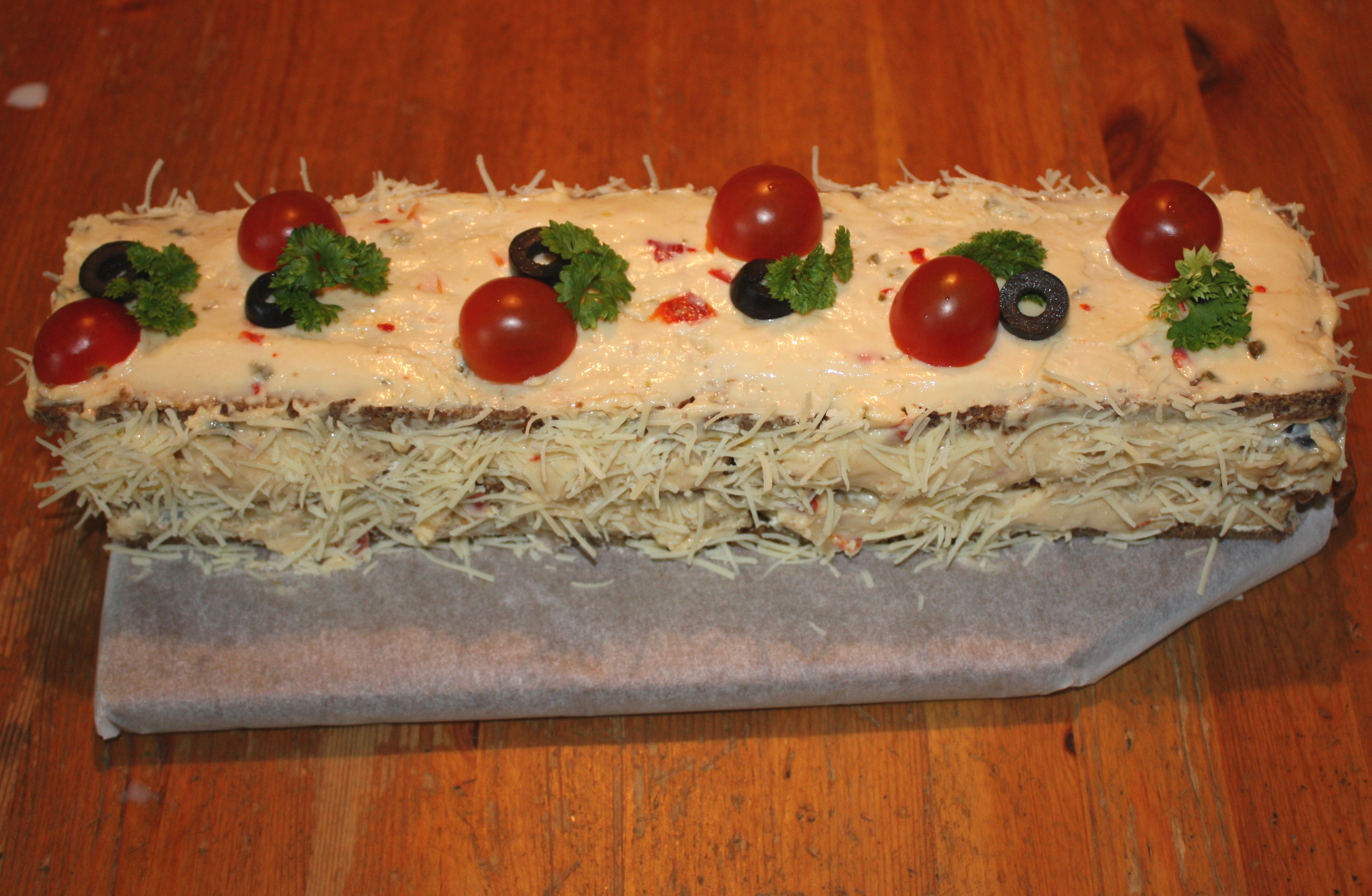
Elongated smörgåstårta with dark bread

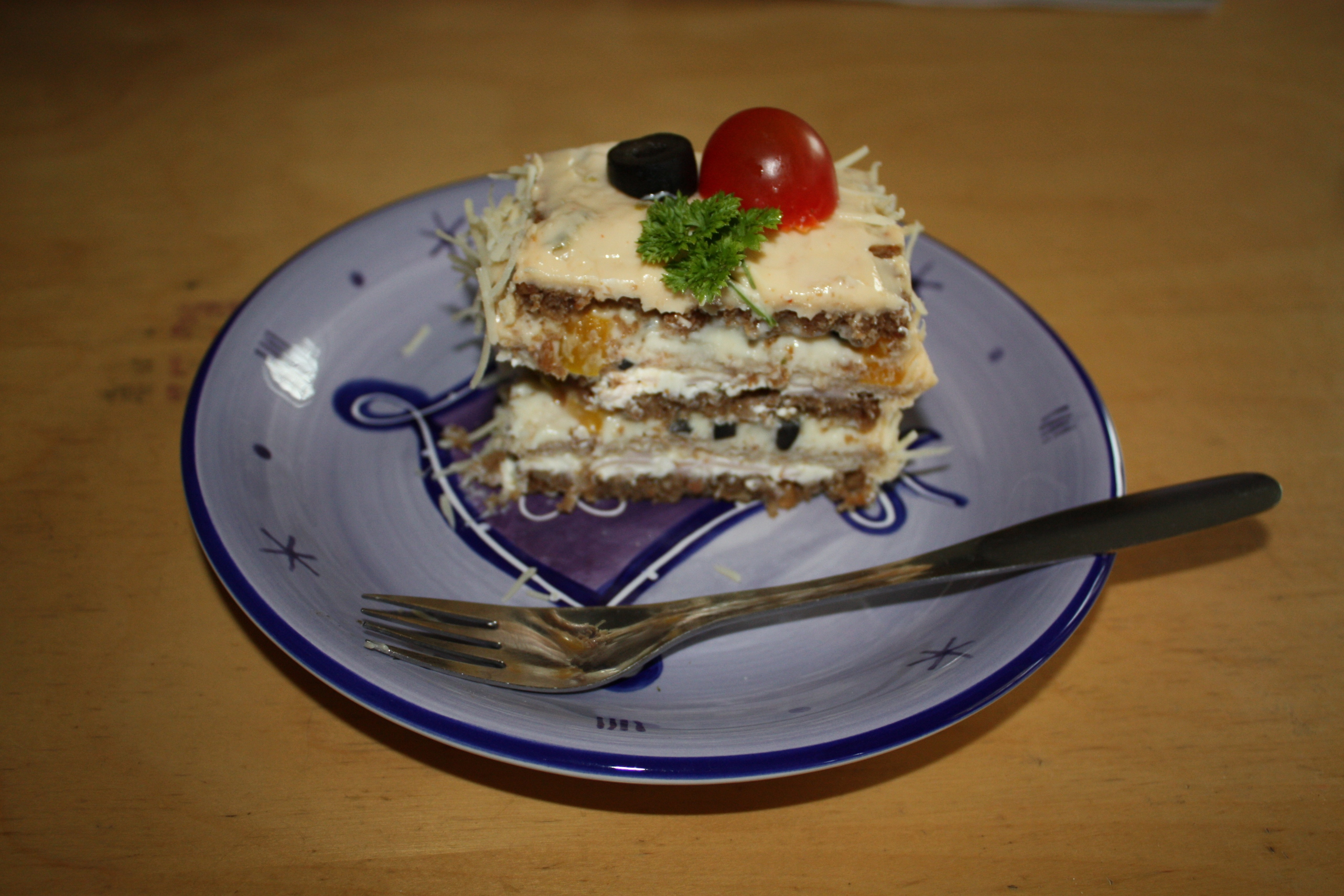
Slice of the aforementioned dark bread smörgåstårta

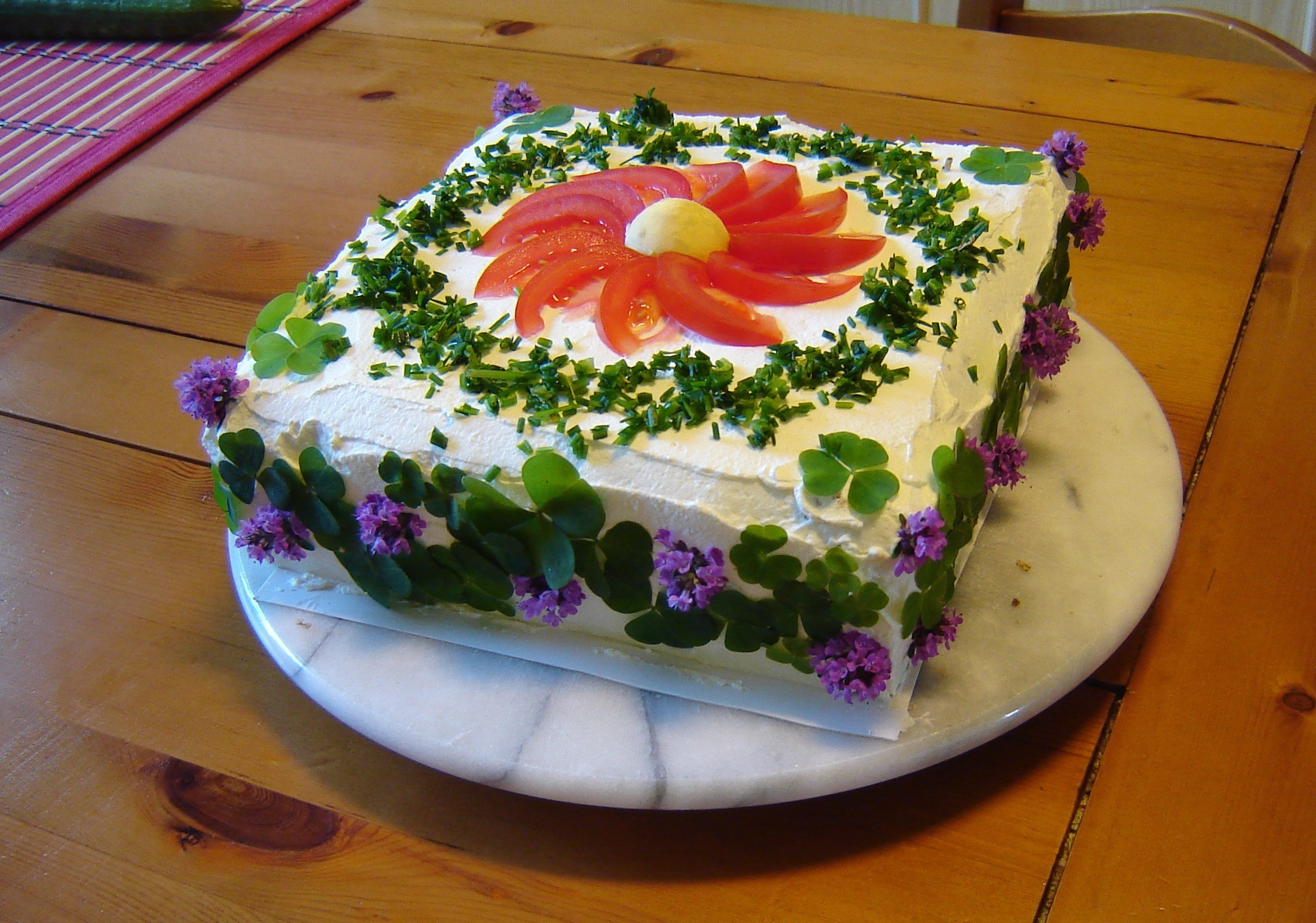
Smörgåstårta with cream-cheese icing (Note: Plus chives, boiled egg yolk, wood-sorrel leaves, tomatoes and flowers for decoration.)

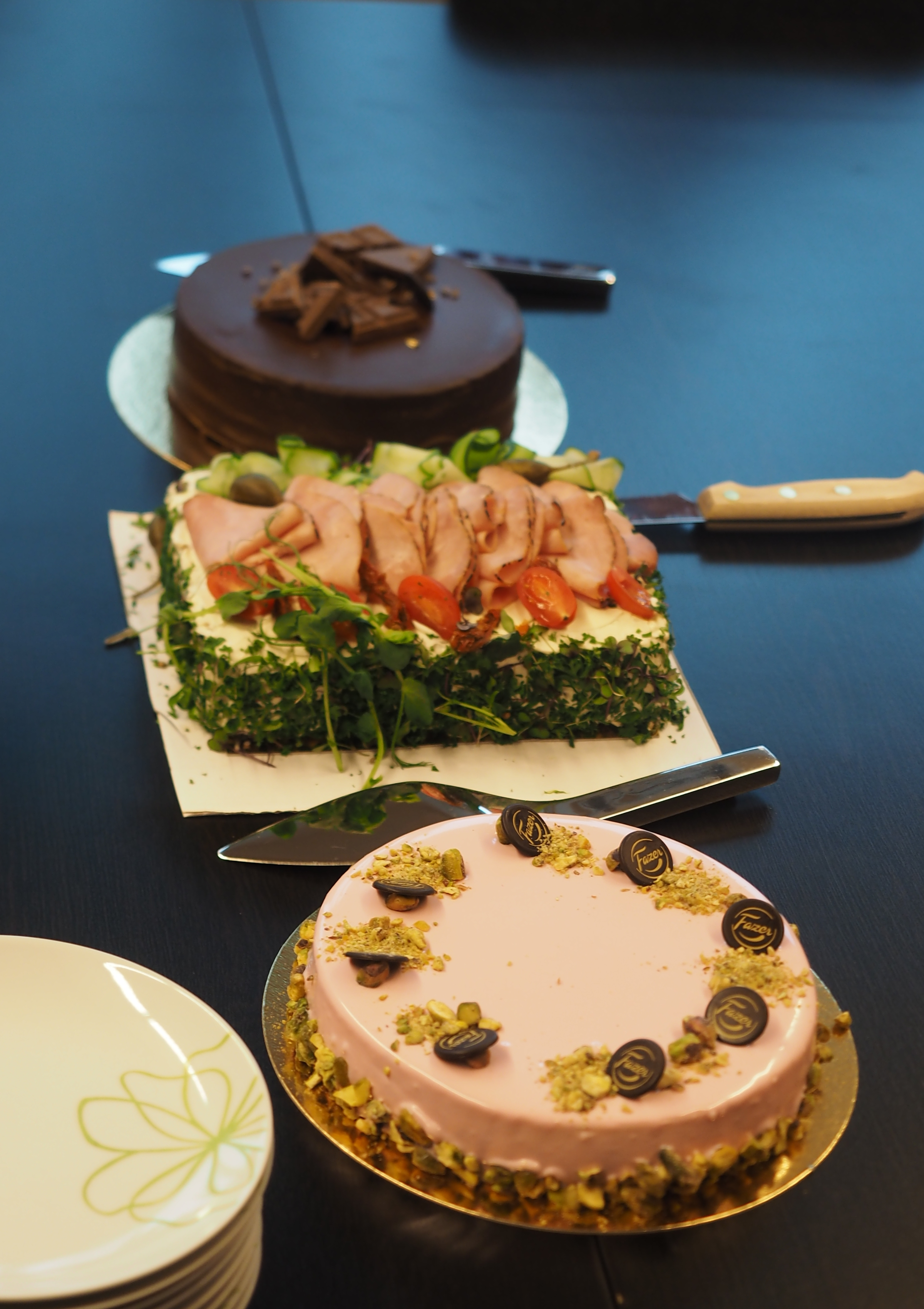
A smörgåstårta between two sweet cakes

== See also ==
- Sandwich-loaf
