= Alex Raymond =

American cartoonist and illustrator (1909–1956)

- Promotional photograph of Raymond from King Features' Famous Artists and Writers, 1949
- Born: Alexander Gillespie Raymond Jr. October 2, 1909 New Rochelle, New York, U.S.
- Died: September 6, 1956 (aged 46) Westport, Connecticut, U.S.
- Areas: Cartoonist, Artist
- Notable works: Flash Gordon; Rip Kirby
- Awards: Reuben Award (1949); Comic Book Hall of Fame (1996)

Alexander Gillespie Raymond Jr. (October 2, 1909 – September 6, 1956) was an American cartoonist and illustrator who was best known for creating the Flash Gordon comic strip for King Features Syndicate in 1934. The strip was subsequently adapted into many other media, from three Universal movie serials (1936's Flash Gordon, 1938's Flash Gordon's Trip to Mars, and 1940's Flash Gordon Conquers the Universe) to a 1950s television series and a 1980 feature film.

Raymond's father loved drawing and encouraged his son to draw from an early age. In the early 1930s, this led Raymond to become an assistant illustrator on strips such as Tillie the Toiler and Tim Tyler's Luck. Towards the end of 1933, Raymond created the epic Flash Gordon science fiction comic strip to compete with the popular Buck Rogers comic strip. Before long, Flash was the more popular strip. Raymond also worked on the jungle adventure saga Jungle Jim and spy adventure Secret Agent X-9 concurrently with Flash, though his increasing workload caused him to leave Secret Agent X-9 to another artist by 1935. He left the strips in 1944 to join the Marines, saw combat in the Pacific Ocean theater in 1945, and was demobilized in 1946. Upon his return to civilian life, Raymond created and illustrated the much-heralded Rip Kirby, a private detective comic strip. In 1956, Raymond was killed in a car crash at the age of 46.

He became known as "the artist's artist" and his much-imitated style can be seen on the many strips that he illustrated. Raymond worked from live models furnished by Manhattan's Walter Thornton Agency, as indicated in "Modern Jules Verne," a profile of Raymond published in the Dell Four-Color Flash Gordon #10 (1942), showing how Thornton model Patricia Quinn posed as a character in the strip.

Numerous artists have cited Raymond as an inspiration for their work, including comic artists Jack Kirby, Bob Kane, Russ Manning, and Al Williamson. George Lucas cited Raymond as a major influence for Star Wars. He was inducted into the Will Eisner Comic Book Hall of Fame in 1996. Maurice Horn stated that Raymond unquestionably possessed "the most versatile talent" of all the comic strip creators. He has also described his style as "precise, clear, and incisive." Carl Barks described Raymond as a man "who could combine craftsmanship with emotions and all the gimmicks that went into a good adventure strip". Raymond's influence on other cartoonists was considerable during his lifetime and did not diminish after his death.

== Biography ==
=== Early life and career ===
Raymond was born in 1909 in New Rochelle, New York; his parents were Beatrice W. (née Crossley) and Alexander Gillespie Raymond Sr. The boy was raised in the Roman Catholic faith.

His father was a civil engineer and road builder who encouraged his son's love of drawing from an early age, even "covering one wall of his office in the Woolworth Building" with his young son's artwork. Raymond's father died when he was 12, after which he felt that there was not as viable a future in art as he had hoped. He attended Iona Prep on an athletic scholarship. There, he played fullback on coach "Turk" Smith's 1926 football team.

Raymond's first job was as an order clerk in Wall Street. In the wake of the 1929 economic crisis he enrolled in the Grand Central School of Art in New York City and began working as a solicitor for a mortgage broker.

Approaching former neighbor Russ Westover, Raymond soon quit his job and by 1930 was assisting Westover on his Tillie the Toiler comic strip. As a result, Raymond was "introduced to King Features Syndicate", where he later became a staff artist, and for whom he would produce his greatest artwork.

Raymond was influenced by a variety of strip cartoonists and magazine illustrators, including Matt Clark, Franklin Booth, and John La Gatta. From late 1931 to 1933, Raymond assisted Lyman Young on Tim Tyler's Luck, eventually becoming the ghost artist in "1932 and 1933 ... [on] both the daily strip and the Sunday page", turning it "into one of the most eye-catching strips of the time". Concurrently, Raymond assisted Chic Young on Blondie.

In 1933, King Features assigned him to do the art for an espionage action-adventure strip, Secret Agent X-9, scripted by novelist Dashiell Hammett, and Raymond's illustrative approach to that strip made him King Features' leading talent.

=== Flash Gordon, Jungle Jim, and Secret Agent X-9 ===
Towards the end of 1933, King Features asked him to create a Sunday page that could compete with Buck Rogers in the 25th Century, a popular science fiction adventure strip that had debuted in 1929 and already spawned the rival Brick Bradford in 1933. According to King Features, syndicate president Joe Connolly "gave Raymond an idea ... based on fantastic adventures similar to those of Jules Verne".

Alongside ghostwriter Don W. Moore, a pulp-fiction veteran, Raymond created the visually sumptuous science fiction epic comic strip Flash Gordon. The duo also created the "complementary strip, Jungle Jim, an adventurous saga set in South-East Asia", a topper which ran above Flash in some papers. Raymond was concurrently illustrating Secret Agent X-9, which premiered January 22, 1934, two weeks after the two other strips. It was Flash Gordon that would outlast the others, quickly "develop[ing] an audience far surpassing" that of Buck Rogers. Flash Gordon, wrote Stephen Becker, "was wittier and moved faster," so "Buck's position as America's favorite sci-fi hero", wrote historian Bill Crouch Jr., "went down in flames to the artistic lash and spectacle of Alex Raymond's virtuoso artwork." Alex Raymond has stated, "I decided honestly that comic art is an art form in itself. It reflects the life and times more accurately and actually is more artistic than magazine illustration—since it is entirely creative. An illustrator works with camera and models; a comic artist begins with a white sheet of paper and dreams up his own business—he is playwright, director, editor and artist at once." A. E. Mendez has also stated that "Raymond’s achievements are chopped into bite-sized pieces by the comic art cognoscenti. Lost in the worthwhile effort to distinguish comics as an art form, the romance, sweep and beauty of Raymond's draftsmanship, his incomparable line work, is dismissed. To many, it's just pretty pictures. Somehow or another, it's OK for people like Caniff and Eisner to borrow from film. That’s real storytelling. But for Raymond to study illustrators, well, that's just not comics."

Debuting on January 7, 1934, Raymond's first Flash strip introduced the "world-famous polo player", improbably roped into a space adventure alongside love-interest Dale Arden and scientist Dr. Hans Zarkov. Transported by rocket to the planet Mongo, "which was about to collide with Earth", the trio "immediately became embroiled in the affairs of Mongo's inhabitants—particularly those of its insidious warlord, Emperor Ming", who would become Flash Gordon's nemesis throughout the franchise's many incarnations.

Early in 1935, Hammett decided to depart as writer of Secret Agent X-9 in order to pursue a career in Hollywood. While it has been presumed that Raymond took on the writing duties of the strip until a replacement could be found, biographer Tom Roberts instead believes that the strip was written by committee during editorial conference, a view R. C. Harvey believes is supported by the strips themselves. Saint author Leslie Charteris was hired to take over the writing of the strip in September 1935, but the pair would only collaborate on one storyline. By the end of 1935, "the [work]load was too much for Raymond," who left Secret Agent X-9 to artist Charles Flanders, in order to devote more time to his meticulous Sunday pages.

Raymond's work on X-9 is said to particularly reach for "the feel of the best pulp interior art of the time," a style that would evolve with his own so-called "great flourishes" and "later blossom to full effect in Flash Gordon and Jungle Jim". "Under his pen," writes Maurice Horn, his Sunday pages "became world famous (especially Flash Gordon)." However, historian and critic R.C. Harvey argues that "despite Raymond's great talent as an illustrator, his deployment of the comic-strip medium (on X-9) was not very impressive." Harvey feels that Raymond's work suffers in comparison to Milton Caniff's contemporaneous work, with Raymond's failings as a visual storyteller less noticeable on a weekly Sunday strip, where the space afforded played to his skills as an illustrator.

The first Flash Gordon and one from 1936 show how Raymond expanded from the standard layout to larger panels.

Raymond's sensual artwork—for which the artist particularly "studied popular illustrators," including pulp artist Matt Clark, whose work Raymond's male figures particularly evoke—outshone its borders and "attracted far more loyal readers than ... [the] rather contrived and unconvincing adventure stories" his work depicted. Raymond swiftly became "among the most highly-regarded—and most imitated—in all of comics" for his work on the weekly strip, with Harvey declaring his work on the strip "a technical virtuosity matched on the comics pages only by Harold Foster in Prince Valiant." Raymond evolved the layout of the strip from a four-tier strip in 1934 to a two-tier strip in 1936, reducing the number of panels but doubling their size. Combining this with a removal of dialogue from speech balloons to captions at the bottom of the panel afforded Raymond the space to create detailed and atmospheric backgrounds. Against these spacious backgrounds, the placement of characters in heroic poses "lent the entire enterprise a mythic air."

Flash Gordon gained a daily strip in 1940, illustrated by Austin Briggs. Raymond left the Sunday strip in 1944 to join the Marines, whereupon the daily strip was cancelled and Briggs assumed the Sunday strip duties, continuing until 1948. Briggs was succeeded on the Sundays by Emanuel "Mac" Raboy, while the daily strip was revived in 1951 by Dan Barry. Barry also took over Sunday duties after Raboy's death in 1967.

Run above Flash Gordon, Raymond's Jungle Jim is described by Armando Mendez as "a thing of beauty ... always more than just a topper or a shallow response to Hal Foster's exquisite Tarzan". The companion strip evolved over time, morphing from an initial "two tiers and up to six panels [layout], with speech balloons" into "a single row, of four very tall panels with declamatory text and static, vertical composition". Raymond's skill and artistic dexterity, however, kept the storytelling constant and the artwork vibrant. Jungle Jim was "set in contemporary times and the exotic Malay peninsula of islands, [but] was intended to hark back to the original tales of Kipling, Haggard and Burroughs".

=== Military career ===
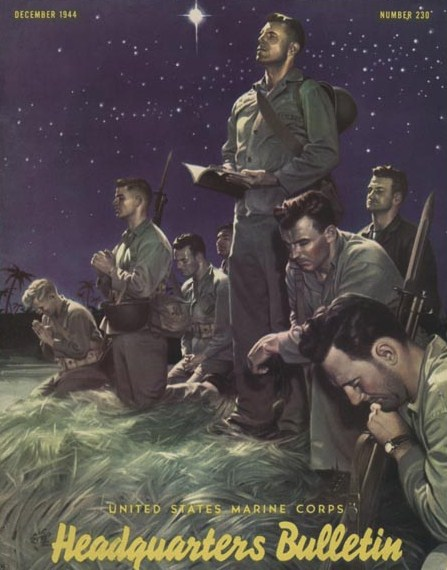
While he was in the Marines, Raymond painted "Marines at Prayer" for the Marine Corps' Headquarters Bulletin (December 1944).

Raymond took the war in Europe seriously enough to incorporate it into his strips, with Flash returning to Earth in the spring of 1941. Jungle Jim found himself involved in the conflict too, fighting in the U.S. Army. Raymond was becoming "restive about doing his duty", a restlessness increased by the knowledge that four of his five brothers were already enlisted. In February 1944, Raymond left King Features and his work on the Sunday Flash Gordon/Jungle Jim pages to join the U.S. Marine Corps, commissioned as a captain and serving in the public-relations arm. Raymond is quoted as stating "I just had to get into this fight ... I've always been the kind of guy who gets a lump in his throat when a band plays the 'Star Spangled Banner'".

Shortly thereafter, he "was sent to Quantico for training in the curriculum of the Aviation Ground Officer's School," and was soon producing "posters and patriotic images from a government office in Philadelphia." His most famous image from this time is "Marines at Prayer," which "was destined to become a well-known and well-circulated image of Marines on a battlefield pausing for worship." Raymond also "designed the official 1944 Marine Corps Christmas card." Desiring "to get closer to the action," he then trained at the Marine Corps Air Station in Santa Barbara before serving in the Pacific Ocean theater "on the 1945 cruise of the escort carrier USS Gilbert Islands." Treated by his fellow marines (who had been raised on Flash Gordon) as a celebrity, he was nonetheless seen as "a down-to-earth fellow," and well liked. He saw "a period of intense combat in June 1945," and was "made an honorary member of VMTB-143 in August 1945." Raymond had, in May 1945, designed a squadron patch for the men of VMTB-143, after which the "squadron adopted the new name 'The Rocket Raiders'."

He was demobilized as a major in 1946. Upon his return, Raymond was unable to return to Flash Gordon. King Features were not prepared to usurp Austin Briggs from the Sunday strip and pointed out that Raymond had left voluntarily to enlist. Relatives of Raymond recall the artist as resenting this decision, which left him feeling "cast off with so little regard." However, King Features offered Raymond the opportunity to create a new strip.

=== Rip Kirby ===
Alex Raymond's Rip Kirby (July 28, 1956), his final strip with Judith Lynne "Honey" Dorian.

Raymond's "police daily strip," named after its central character – J. Remington "Rip" Kirby – debuted on March 4, 1946, conceived (and initially scripted) by King Features editor Ward Greene. The plotting of the strips is harder to attribute, the scant evidence available supporting the notion that Raymond was more than simply an illustrator. However, as was relatively commonplace on such strips, published credit went to Raymond, whose name was the major selling feature; the artist even managed to gain a part-ownership deal with King Features and a better split of the profits than was usual. Rip Kirby was Raymond's reintroduction to newspaper strips after the war, and he was quick to forge a new "up-to-date" style for the strip, while keeping ties to the audience he had built up with Flash Gordon, Jungle Jim, and Secret Agent X-9.

Running alongside the post-World War II reintegration of America's military into civilian life, Rip (like Raymond) was "an ex-Marine," who "set himself up as a private detective" a vocation tailor-made to provide daily thrills.

Described by Stephen Becker as "modern and almost too intellectual", the strip eschewed many of the pulp fictional detective tropes (e.g. alcoholism, two-fisted assistants, and an assortment of interchangeable femmes fatale). Instead, "[Rip] did more cogitating than fisticuffing, and smoked a leisurely pipe while he did it;" "had a frail, balding assistant ... instead of a two-fisted sidekick;" "had a steady girlfriend ... [and] [i]f that wasn't enough, he even wore glasses! Rip "lived and worked in a recognizable, glamorous, modern New York City on cases involving very human frailties and vice", and "grew older as the strip progressed", a continuity advancement little seen in the strips of the time (although pioneered in Gasoline Alley and Mary Worth). Raymond noted the change in subject matter, commenting that "I wanted to do something different and more down to earth."

Stylistically, "Raymond turned to the Cooper Studio-Al Parker advertising style for inspiration, spurring a new generation of comic artists to follow a fresh direction", that of "glorify[ing] contemporary post-War American life". Although the strip was published entirely in black and white, Raymond worked hard to add tone through artistic technique. "Raymond nevertheless [colored] through his use of varying linework ... [creating] color through contrast". His new style was much imitated throughout the industry and became known as 'the Raymond style'.

Circulation of the strip rose steadily, and it was the artist who was apportioned most of the praise – including being awarded the fourth Reuben Award in 1949. He also served as the National Cartoonists Society's president from 1950 until 1952, putting into place the committee structure responsible for overseeing the organization, and threw himself into championing the medium as an art form. Raymond profited in recognizability as well as financially, and continued on the strip until his untimely death in September 1956. His collaborator from 1952 was writer Fred Dickenson (who wrote the strip for a further 34 years), and he was succeeded artistically by magazine and Prize Publications' Young Romance illustrator John Prentice. Commentators have said that Prentice echoed the Rip Kirby artistic style, but lacked "Raymond's excellent design sense," although Prentice received praise for his work from the Raymond family. Prentice drew Rip Kirby until just before he died in 1999, the strip itself concluding a month later.

== Legacy ==
In 1967, Woody Gelman reprinted in hardcover some of Raymond's earlier comic strip work under his Nostalgia Press imprint. Regarded by Time magazine in 1974—alongside Prince Valiant author-illustrator Hal Foster—as "some sort of genius", and described in Jerry Bails and Hames Ware's Who's Who in American Comic Books as "[p]ossibly the most influential artist on early comic books", Raymond's legacy as an artistic inspiration is immense. Harvey argued that it is because of Raymond and Foster that the illustrative style became the dominant one used for adventure strips. "His work and Foster's created the visual standard by which all such comic strips would henceforth be measured." Biographer Tom Roberts also believes Raymond's work on Rip Kirby "inspired all the soap opera style strips of the fifties and sixties". Roberts argues that strips such as Apartment 3-G "can trace their origins to the success of Raymond's strip". Although his work was rarely seen outside of the newspaper "funny pages", as Raymond preferred to focus his energies on strip work, he also produced a number of "illustrations for Blue Book, Look, Collier's and Cosmopolitan" as well as Esquire.

The "heightened realism" of Raymond's photorealistic style has been "chastised for making his pictures too realistic, too gorgeous for its own sake", although many commentators believe that this very method "plunges the reader into the story". Raymond's work has a "timeless appeal," many aspects of which—including the use of feathering (a shading technique in which a soft series of parallel lines helps to suggest the contour of an object)—have inspired generations of cartoonists, his work becoming "the raw material for the swipe files of future generations". His work on Rip Kirby is especially noted for its use of "sophisticated black spotting", a technique Raymond used from c.1949 "for pacing" reasons. Fellow-cartoonist Stan Drake recalled that Raymond called his black areas "pools of quiet", serving as they did "as a pause for the viewer, something to slow the eye across the strip's panels".

=== Specific influences ===
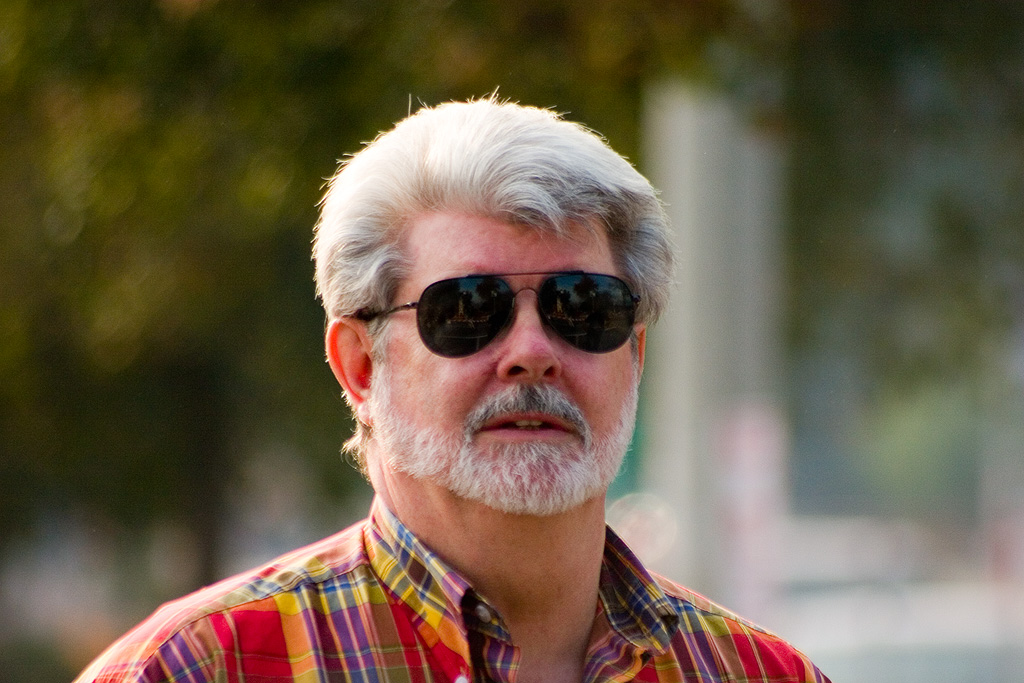
George Lucas, who has cited Raymond as an influence on Star Wars

Alex Raymond's "influence on other cartoonists was considerable during his lifetime and did not diminish after his death". George Lucas has cited Raymond's Flash Gordon as a major influence on his Star Wars films (which, cyclically, inspired the 1980 Flash Gordon film), while Raymond's long shadow has fallen across the comics industry ever since his work saw print. Comics artists who have cited Raymond as a particularly significant influence on their work include Murphy Anderson, Jim Aparo, Matt Baker, Frank Brunner, John Buscema, Gene Colan, Dick Dillin, Lou Fine, José Luis García-López, Frank Giacoia, Bob Haney, Jack Katz, Everett Raymond Kinstler, Joe Kubert, Russ Manning, Mort Meskin, Sheldon Moldoff, Luis Garcia Mozos, Joe Orlando, Mac Raboy, John Romita Jr., Kurt Schaffenberger, Joe Sinnott, Dick Sprang and Alex Toth, among many others.

In particular, Raymond has been named as a key influence by many of the most influential and important comic book artists of all time. EC Comics-staple Al Williamson cites Raymond as a major influence, and is quoted as saying that Raymond was "the reason I became an artist". Indeed, Williamson ultimately assisted on the Flash Gordon strips in the mid-1950s, and Rip Kirby in the mid-1960s (all post-Raymond). Key Golden Age artists credit Raymond with influencing their work. The artistic creators of Batman (Bob Kane) and Superman (Joe Shuster) credit him (alongside Milton Caniff, Billy DeBeck and Roy Crane) as having had a strong influence on their artistic development. Decades later, the herald of the Silver Age (and co-creator of most of Marvel Comics's pantheon of heroes), Jack "King" Kirby also credits Raymond, alongside fellow strip artist Hal Foster, as a particular influence and inspiration.

Cerebus creator Dave Sim has published a comic book since 2008 called glamourpuss which is an examination of Alex Raymond's career (and the techniques of other photorealists like Stan Drake and Al Williamson) structured around a hypothetical storyline set during the last day of Raymond's life.

=== Personal life ===
Raymond married Helen Frances Williams on December 31, 1930, with whom he had five children. The names of his three daughters—Judith, Lynne and Helen—were used in that of Rip Kirby's girlfriend, Judith Lynne "Honey" Dorian. The Raymonds also had two sons: Alan W. and Duncan. He was the great-uncle of actors Matt Dillon and Kevin Dillon. His younger brother, Jim Raymond, was also a cartoonist, and worked as assistant to Chic Young on Blondie.

=== Death ===
On September 6, 1956, a month before his 47th birthday, Raymond was killed in an automobile accident in Westport, Connecticut. He was driving fellow cartoonist Stan Drake's 1956 Corvette at twice the 25 mph (40 km/h) speed limit when he hit a tree and was killed. In his biography, Roberts described the circumstances as a result of the weather. Raymond was driving the convertible with its top down when the rain started to fall. He decided to reach his destination quicker rather than stop the vehicle to put the top back up. The car crashed and Drake was thrown clear, but Raymond, who was wearing his seat belt to no avail, died instantly. Speculation surrounded the nature of his death. Drake and some others believed that Raymond was suicidal. Raymond had been involved in four automobile accidents in the month prior to his death. This led Drake to say that Raymond "had been trying to kill himself". Author Arlen Schumer ascribed Raymond's personal life as the motive for suicide. Schumer alleged that Raymond had been having affairs and that his wife was refusing to grant him a divorce. R. C. Harvey dismissed this motivation: "Committing suicide strikes me as an odd way for a man of Raymond's sophistication to react to his disappointment in romance". Harvey also noted that no mention of any alleged affairs appears in Tom Roberts's biography, "probably out of consideration to Raymond's surviving family". Drake has also been quoted as speculating that Raymond "hit the accelerator by mistake". Raymond was buried in St. John's Roman Catholic Cemetery in Darien, Connecticut.

== Awards ==
Alex Raymond received a Reuben Award from the National Cartoonists Society in 1949 for his work on Rip Kirby, and he later served as president of the society in 1950 and 1951. He was inducted into the Will Eisner Comic Book Hall of Fame in 1996. He was inducted into the Society of Illustrators Hall of Fame in 2014.

Maurice Horn calls Raymond "one of the most celebrated comic artists of all time as the creator of four outstanding comic features (a feat unequaled to this day)," noting that he "received many distinctions and awards during his lifetime for his work, both as a cartoonist and as a magazine illustrator."

== Bibliography ==
Raymond's work includes:

- Tillie the Toiler (assistant, 1930)
- Tim Tyler's Luck (assistant, 1930–1933)
- Blondie (assistant, 1930–1933)
- Flash Gordon (with writer Don W. Moore, 1934–1943)
- Secret Agent X-9 (with writer Dashiell Hammett, 1934–1935)
- Jungle Jim (with writer Don W. Moore, 1934–1944)
- Rip Kirby (with writer Ward Greene, 1946–1956; with writer Fred Dickenson, 1956)

=== Collected editions ===
Raymond's work has been collected a number of times. Most recently:

- Flash Gordon (hardcover, Checker Book Publishing Group):
  - Volume 1 (collects Raymond's earliest Sunday Strips starting from the first, printed on January 7, 1934; 98 pages, October 2003, ISBN 0-9741664-3-X)
  - Volume 2 (collects strips from 1935 and 1936; 100 pages, December 2004, ISBN 0-9741664-6-4)
  - Volume 3 (collects the pages printed between October 25, 1936, and August 1, 1937; 96 pages, May 2005, ISBN 1-933160-25-X)
  - Volume 4 (collects strips printed between 1938 and 1940; November 2005, ISBN 1-933160-26-8)
  - Volume 5 (collects "The Ice Kingdom of Mongo", "Power Men of Mongo", and "The Fall of Ming"; 1940 to 1941; 80 pages, November 2005, ISBN 1-933160-27-6)
  - Volume 6 (collects the pages printed from August 1941 to May 1943; 100 pages, April 2007, ISBN 1-933160-28-4)
  - Volume 7 (collects the final strips from mid-1943, until the final Raymond issue from February 1945; 100 pages, December 2006, ISBN 1-933160-20-9)
- Rip Kirby (hardcover, IDW):
  - Volume 1 (collects strips printed between 1946 and 1948; 2009, ISBN 978-1-60010-484-8)
  - Volume 2 (collects strips printed between 1948 and 1951; March 2010, ISBN 978-1-60010-582-1)
  - Volume 3 (collects strips printed between 1951 and 1954; November 2010, ISBN 978-1-60010-785-6)
  - Volume 4 (collects strips printed between 1954 and 1956; August 2011, ISBN 978-1-60010-989-8)
- Flash Gordon & Jungle Jim (hardcover, IDW):
  - Volume 1 (collects strips printed between 1934 and 1936; December 2011, ISBN 978-1-61377-015-3)
  - Volume 2 (collects strips printed between 1936 and 1939; August 2012, ISBN 978-1-61377-220-1)
  - Volume 3 (collects strips printed between 1939 and 1941; April 2013, ISBN 978-161377-580-6)
  - Volume 4 (collects strips printed between 1942 and 1944; May 2014, ISBN 978-161377-917-0)
- Secret Agent X-9 (hardcover, IDW):
  - 1934-1936 (collects strips printed between 1934 and 1936; February 2015 ISBN 978-1-63140-211-1)
