= Dagobert (sandwich) =

Type of sandwich from Belgium

- Type: Sandwich
- Place of origin: Belgium
- Main ingredients: baguette, ham, cheese, salad vegetables, pickles

A dagobert in Wallonia, club in Brussels or Smos in Flanders is a sandwich popular in Belgium, consisting of a baguette filled with ham, cheese and raw vegetables. The "Belgicism" dagobert was reported as being included in the Éditions Larousse 2019 edition of its dictionary.
