= Blondie (comic strip) =

American comic strip starting 1930

- Blondie logo, featuring Dagwood, Blondie, Daisy, son Alexander, and daughter Cookie.
- Author(s): Chic Young (1930–1973); Dean Young (1973–present)
- Current status/schedule: Running
- Launch date: September 8, 1930; 96 years ago
- Syndicate(s): King Features Syndicate
- Genre(s): Humor, gag-a-day

Blondie is a comic strip created by American cartoonist Chic Young. The comic strip is distributed by King Features Syndicate, and has been published in newspapers since September 8, 1930. The success of the strip, which features the eponymous blonde and her sandwich-loving husband Dagwood, led to the long-running Blondie film series (1938–1950) and the Blondie radio program (1939–1950).

Young wrote and drew Blondie until his death in 1973, when creative control passed to his son Dean Young. A number of artists have assisted on drawing the strip over the years, including Alex Raymond, Jim Raymond, Paul Fung Jr., Mike Gersher, Stan Drake, Denis Lebrun, Jeff Parker, and (since 2005) John Marshall. Despite these changes, Blondie has remained popular, appearing in more than 2,000 newspapers in 47 countries and translated into 35 languages. From 2006 to 2013, Blondie was also available via email through King Features' DailyINK service. On January 1, 2026, the first few Blondie strips from 1930 entered the public domain. Many of the later Blondie strips published before May 1933 are also in the public domain due to no renewal of copyright.

== Overview ==
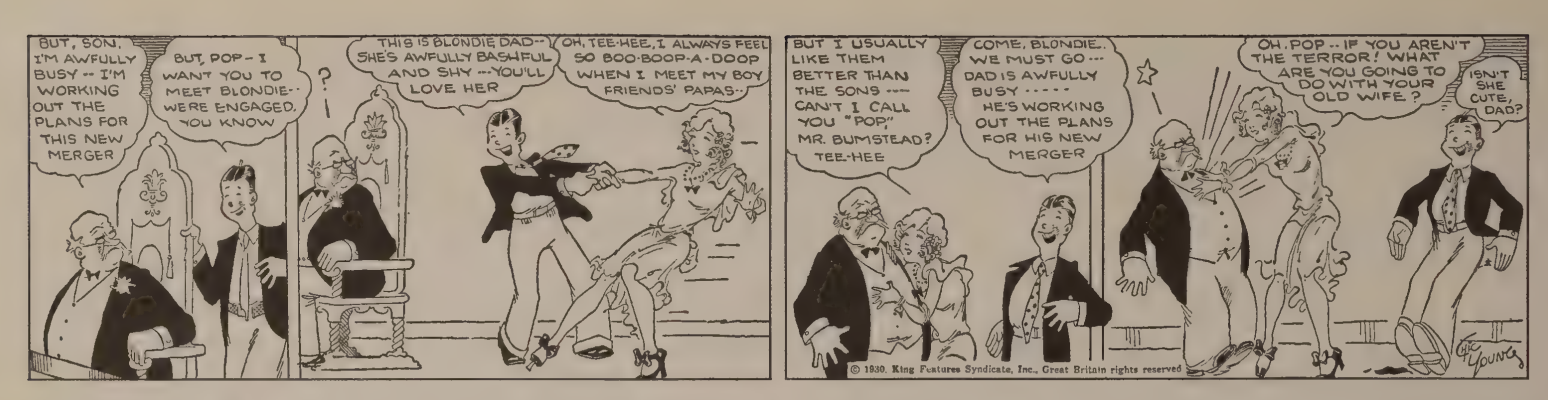
The first Blondie comic strip, September 1930

Designed to follow in the footsteps of Young's earlier "pretty girl" creations Beautiful Bab and Dumb Dora, Blondie focused on the adventures of Blondie Boopadoop—a carefree flapper girl who spent her days in dance halls along with her boyfriend Dagwood Bumstead, heir to an industrial fortune. The name "Boopadoop" derives from the scat singing lyric that was popularized by Helen Kane's 1928 song "I Wanna Be Loved by You".

Blondie and Dagwood debuted on September 8, 1930, in the New York American and several other newspapers across North America. The strip was only moderately popular in its first two and a half years, as interest in humorous "pretty girl" stories dried up as a result of the Great Depression, turning Blondie into a parody of those strips and taking a more melodramatic direction. In mid-1932, and considering the scenario to have run its course, Young briefly tried writing Dagwood out of the daily continuities by having his parents send him on a cruise to Europe and replacing him as Blondie's boyfriend with a garage mechanic, but immediate reader response led to Dagwood returning by late August.

=== Marriage ===
On February 17, 1933, after much fanfare and build-up, Blondie and Dagwood were married. After a month-and-a-half-long hunger strike by Dagwood to get his parents' blessing, as they strongly disapproved of his marrying beneath his class, they disinherited him. Left only with a check to pay for their honeymoon, the Bumsteads were forced to become a middle-class suburban family. The marriage was a significant media event, given the comic strip's popularity. The catalog for the University of Florida's 2005 exhibition "75 Years of Blondie, 1930–2005" notes:

Blondie's marriage marked the beginning of a change in her personality. From that point forward, she gradually assumed her position as the sensible head of the Bumstead household. And Dagwood, who previously had been cast in the role of straight man to Blondie's comic antics, took over as the comic strip's clown.

=== Setting ===
In conjunction with a contest to name the daughter, who eventually became known as "Cookie", Chic Young stated that the Bumsteads are "a little family out in Joplin, Mo."

The Joplin Globe clarified in an August 1946 issue, "Dagwood Bumstead and family, including Daisy and the pups, live in the suburbs of Joplin, Missouri," citing Young.

=== Cast of characters ===
- Blondie Bumstead (née Ruthie Boopadoop): The eponymous leading lady of the comic strip, Blondie is a smart, sweet and responsible woman. She can be stressed at times due to her young family and Dagwood's antics, and despite being usually laid-back and patient, Blondie does get upset sometimes. She is also extremely beautiful, with golden hair, gentle curls, and a shapely figure. A friend once told Dagwood that Blondie looked like a 'million bucks.' In 1991, she began a catering business with her neighbor, Tootsie Woodley.
- Dagwood Bumstead: Blondie's husband and a kind and loving, yet clumsy, naïve, and lazy man, his cartoonish antics are the basis for the strip. He is a big fan of sports (primarily football and baseball) and has a large, insatiable appetite for food (but he remains slender). Dagwood is especially fond of making and eating the towering Dagwood sandwich. He celebrates even the most insignificant holidays and approaches Thanksgiving (a holiday known for lavish dinners) with the same reverence most people reserve for Christmas. His continuous antagonistic and comical confrontations with his boss, Mr. Dithers, for numerous reasons including Dagwood's laziness and silly mistakes, is a subplot that gets considerable attention in the strip. His klutziness is also a fundamental part of his encounters with Mr. Beasley the mailman. Another subplot deals with Dagwood and his neighbor Herb. Dagwood can also often be seen napping on his own couch. He is employed as the office manager at J. C. Dithers Construction Company.
- Alexander Bumstead: The elder child of Blondie and Dagwood, he is in his late teens, and was formerly referred to by his pet name "Baby Dumpling". As a child, he was very mischievous and precocious. As a teenager, he is athletic, levelheaded, and intelligent. Despite resembling his father, he is more down-to-earth, like his mother. His full name, revealed in the November 7, 1934, strip, is Alexander Hamilton Bumstead.
- Cookie Bumstead: The younger child of Blondie and Dagwood, she is in her early teens. Cookie is portrayed as a sweet, bubbly teenaged girl whose interests include dating, hanging out with friends, and clothes. Her appearance has changed the most compared to the other characters. As a child (1940s–mid 1950s), she originally had long, curly hair with a black bow holding a long curl on the top of her head. As a young teen (late 1950s–1960s), she wore her hair in a ponytail with curly bangs. As an older teen (1970s–1990s), she wore her hair long with a black headband. Later (2000s), she dropped the hairband and wore her hair with bangs and barrettes, and flipped to the sides. Her current hairstyle is long with bangs and flipped at sides.
- Daisy: The Bumsteads' family dog, whose best friend is Dagwood, frequently changes her expression in response to Dagwood's comments or other activities. She gave birth to puppies in the later years of the comic. Daisy's birthday is September 19.
- Mr. Beasley the Postman: He is the Bumsteads' mailman, with whom Dagwood seems to always collide and knock down as Dagwood hurriedly leaves the house. Variations on this gag are that once Alexander collided with Beasley and once the Bumsteads installed an outside mailbox-which Dagwood ran into instead of Mr Beasley. Beasley's birthday is August 26.
- Mr. Julius Caesar Dithers: Founder of the J.C. Dithers Construction Company and Dagwood's boss, he dictates orders to his employees and believes the best thing in life is money. Mr. Dithers has a very harsh personality and is portrayed as a difficult and controlling employer. He continuously denies Dagwood's requests for a raise and frequently threatens to fire him. He always addresses Dagwood somewhat disrespectfully by using only his last name "Bumstead". Although it usually does not seem like it at the workplace, Mr. Dithers is a good-hearted man. Despite the frequent disputes at work, Julius and Cora are frequent dinner guests at Dagwood's home after work. On these occasions, the relationship is more cordial, with Mr. Dithers addressing Dagwood by his first name. A running gag for many years is that whenever Dagwood messes up an important contract Dithers will pick Dagwood up and either kick or throw him down the hallway. On the 75th anniversary of Blondie, Dithers became great friends with the visiting King of ID! Julius' birthday is July 2.
- Mrs. Cora Dithers: Mr. Dithers' wife, she usually gets into fights with him as she exerts control over him (she usually wins). She is great friends with Blondie.
- Herb Woodley: Dagwood's best friend and next-door neighbor, Herb, though, can be extremely selfish and mean at times when he does not return the expensive power tools and favors that he usually borrows from Dagwood. Herb constantly finds means to annoy and infuriate him.
- Tootsie Woodley: Herb's wife and Blondie's best friend, Tootsie and Blondie can empathize with one another as women, mothers, and particularly as spouses of eccentric husbands. In 1991, she joined Blondie in starting a catering business.
- Elmo Tuttle: A kid in the neighborhood, he has a friendship with Dagwood (whom he calls "Mr. B"), but sometimes annoys him. His last name was originally "Fiffenhauser". Replaced a similar character named Alvin Fuddle who was Baby Dumpling's best friend through the 1940s.
- Lou: He is the owner and counterman at Lou's Diner, where Dagwood goes for lunch. Dagwood sometimes suggests new specials for the diner. Lou's arms are covered with tattoos (a heart and a Navy anchor) and he always has a toothpick in his mouth. His cooking skill (or at least that of the small cook who sometimes appears beside him) is dubious and all his meals are of a quality that Blondie would never be party to -- rancid, over-spiced, or tasteless, and way too expensive. Lou does little to improve the quality of his food or to gain the satisfaction of his customers. Once when Lou closed the diner for a week so he could visit his mother in Hoboken, Dagwood suffered "withdrawal pains".
- Claudia and Dwitzell: They are carpoolers with Dagwood and Herb. Claudia is a lawyer. No occupation has been identified for Dwitzell, sometimes called "Dwitz". Dwitzell works in the novelty business.
- Mike Morelli the Barber: Dagwood's barber, he likes to make fun of Dagwood's hairstyle and can usually be seen with his nameplate, "M. Morelli", displayed by his barber's chair. Mike loves to lure and drag Dagwood into political debates at points where it usually leaves Dagwood frustrated.
- Marlene: Dithers' secretary.
- Alvin Fuddle: Baby Dumpling's best friend, a mischievous boy who annoys the Bumsteads especially Dagwood. Only appeared from the 1930s to 1950s and plays a more prominent role in the Columbia film series. A similar character named Elmo Tuttle replaces his role.
- Maya: Blondie's pastry chef, hired in 2024.

=== Running gags ===
Dagwood has created a typical Dagwood sandwich in this April 17, 2007, strip.

Several running gags occur in Blondie, reflecting the trend after Chic Young's death for the strip to focus almost entirely on Dagwood as the lead character:

- Dagwood often collides with Mr. Beasley the mailman while running out the front door—late for work.
- Other variations of the late-for-work gag: Dagwood keeping his car pool waiting, running after their car or stuck in traffic. In earlier decades, he had been late for the bus, or even earlier in the strip's run, late for the streetcar.
- Dagwood's impossible appetite for food:
  - The impossibly tall sandwiches Dagwood fixes for himself, which came to be known colloquially as the "Dagwood sandwich", became famous.
  - Dagwood in his pajamas is having a midnight snack, with most of the refrigerator contents spread out on the kitchen table, or balanced precariously on his extended arms on the way to the table.
  - At Lou's Diner, whenever Lou's cook makes up a new extra hot Chili dish, Dagwood eats it (despite Lou's warnings) and Dagwood always ends drinking water endlessly to cool the burning spices in his mouth
- Dagwood has a propensity to nap on the couch during the day, often interrupted by Elmo, who wants to ask him a question, Blondie, who has a chore she wants him to do, or Dithers, who offers him his job back after he fired him.
- Dagwood sings in the bathtub, or is interrupted (usually by family members or Elmo) while he is trying to relax in the tub. Another gag along the same lines involves Dagwood reading books in the tub.
- Dagwood contends with brazen or obnoxious salesmen at his door, selling undesirable or impossible-looking items. It usually ends with Dagwood and the salesman getting into a physical confrontation.
- A variation of the above has the salesmen calling on the telephone.
- Dagwood and Herb Woodley spend some weekend time together, which usually escalates into a brawl.
- Dagwood demands a raise from Dithers and fails to get it every time.
- Dagwood gets caught goofing off or sleeping at his desk in the office.
- Mr. Dithers fires Dagwood for being incompetent or physically boots him out of his office, usually for messing up an important contract.
- Dagwood gets a menu suggestion from Lou, the wry, blunt, and/or sarcastic diner counterman.
- In the Christmas shopping gag, Dagwood is shown carrying Christmas packages that completely cover up his face and upper body.
- Herb borrows small items—tools, small appliances, books, and (more recently) videos—from Dagwood, then never returns them. Occasionally, Herb lends a borrowed item to a third party, which is then usually passed on to a fourth or fifth party.
- Dagwood's hobby is household carpentry, but unfortunately his projects do not turn out well. Once, he built a small cabinet for Blondie, actually accomplishing all construction steps perfectly, but the result still fails because it does not fit in the space Blondie intended for it. Mostly, he is producing sawdust.
- Dagwood watches TV from his armchair while Daisy sleeps behind the chair; Blondie sits in her own chair facing away from Dagwood.
- From time to time, Dagwood will visit a pet shop and look at an animal (typically a bird) while the shop's owner tells Dagwood some of the creature's funny quirks.

=== Sunday strips ===
Chic Young's Sunday Blondie page for May 7, 1950, when it was at a peak of popularity with the strip, movies, and radio. From 1935 to 1963, Young drew the topper strip, Colonel Potterby and the Duchess, which was displayed below Blondie.

During the early years of the strip, the Sunday installments were much in the vein of the then-popular genre of "pretty girl" strips, rather than spoofing them as in the daily continuities, including a series of different suitors, most notably Hiho Hennepin, a short character who played a similar role to the one held by Dumb Dora's boyfriend Rod. In fact, Dagwood did actually not appear at all in a Sunday page until late 1931, and was only regularly featured in these beginning on January 29, 1933.

Young drew The Family Foursome as a topper from September 21, 1930, to April 21, 1935, after which it was replaced by the pantomime strip Colonel Potterby and the Duchess, which ran until November 3, 1963 (becoming a stand-alone strip in 1958).

For years, the Sunday installments were noted for their histrionic plots, as well for having 12 panels, switching to the standard half-page format in 1986.

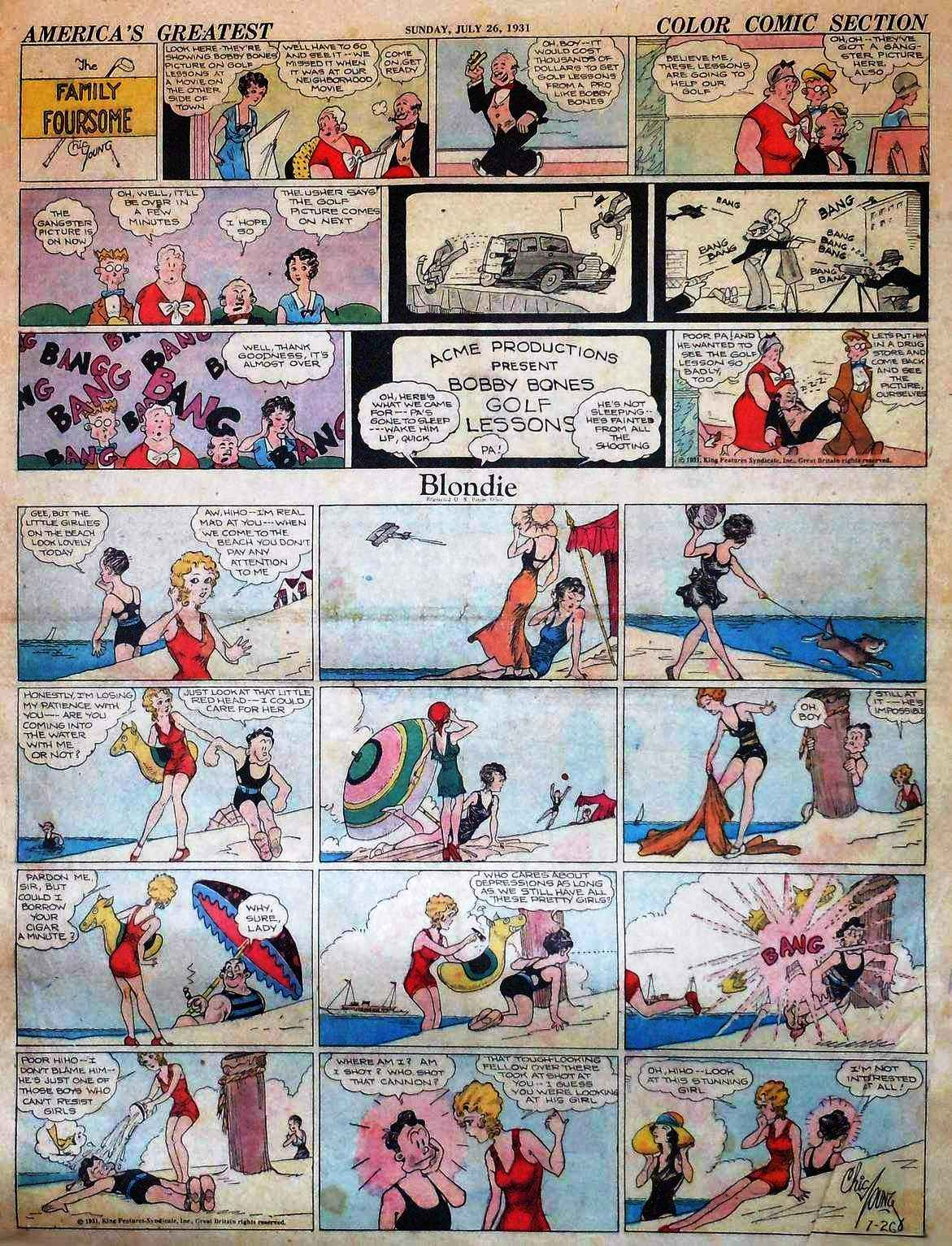
A Blondie Sunday/color strip from 1931.

=== Modernization ===
While the distinctive look and running gags of Blondie have been carefully preserved through the decades, a number of details have been altered to keep up with changing times. The Bumstead kitchen, which remained essentially unchanged from the 1930s through the 1960s, has slowly acquired a more modern look (no more legs on the gas range and no more refrigerators shown with the compressor assembly on the top).

Keeping up with the times, Alexander and Dagwood are shown with a flat-panel computer in this strip from September 24, 2007.

Dagwood no longer wears a hat when he goes to work, nor does Blondie wear her previous hat and gloves when leaving the house. Although some bedroom and bathroom scenes still show him in polka-dot boxer shorts, Dagwood no longer wears garters to hold up his socks. When at home, he frequently wears sport shirts, his standard dress shirt with one large button in the middle is slowly disappearing, and he no longer smokes a pipe at all. Blondie now often wears slacks, and she is no longer depicted as a housewife, since she teamed with Tootsie Woodley to launch a catering business in 1991. Dagwood still knocks heads with his boss, Mr. Dithers, but now does so in a more modern office at J.C. Dithers Construction Company, where desks now sport flat-panel computer monitors, and Mr. Dithers, when in a rage, attempts to smash his laptop into Dagwood's head instead of his old manual typewriter. The staff no longer punches in at a mechanical "time clock", nor do they wear green eyeshades and plastic "sleeve protectors". Telephones have changed from candlestick style to more modern dial phones, to Touch-Tone, and on to cellphones. The round bedside alarm clock has been replaced by a more compact digital unit. Dagwood now begins each morning racing to meet his carpool rather than chasing after a missed streetcar or city bus. Even Mr. Beasley, the mail carrier, now dresses in short-sleeved shirts and walking shorts, rather than the military-style uniform of days gone by.

During the late 1990s and 2000–2001, Alexander worked part-time after high school at the order counter of a fast-food restaurant, the Burger Barn. Occasional references are still made to Cookie and her babysitting. Daisy, who once had a litter of puppies that lived with the family, is now the only dog seen in the Bumstead household. Cookie and Alexander can be seen in modern clothing trends and sometimes use cellphones and reference current television shows and social networking sites, while talking about attending rock concerts of popular current rock, pop, and hip hop music acts.

In this period, when in his basement woodworking shop, Dagwood was shown wearing safety eyeglasses.

Dagwood sometimes breaks the fourth wall by delivering the punchline to the strip, while looking directly at the reader, as in the above panel. Daisy occasionally does the same, though her remarks are limited to "?" and "!" with either a puzzled or a pained expression.

Strips in recent years have included references to recent developments in technology and communication, such as Facebook, Twitter, email, and text messaging.

=== 75th anniversary ===
In 2005, the strip celebrated its 75th anniversary with an extended story arc in which characters from other strips, including Curtis, Garfield, Beetle Bailey, and Hägar the Horrible, made appearances in Blondie. The strip Pearls Before Swine made fun of the fact that their cast was not invited, and decided to invite themselves. This cross-over promotion began July 10, 2005 and continued until September 4, 2005.

=== Foreign versions ===
Blondie has been translated to various languages. In Mexico and South America, it ran as Lorenzo y Pepita, being quite popular between the 1940s and 1980s. While in most countries the family name was "Parachoques", in Chile they had "Jeringuis" as a surname. When it ran in Spain, however, the original names were kept. In French-speaking countries, the strip is known as Blondinette, while Dagwood is known as Dagobert, a name which is still used in France and Belgium to refer to a kind of sandwich.

The French version of Blondie from January 3, 2006

== Awards ==
- In 1948, Chic Young's work on the strip won him the National Cartoonists Society's Billy DeBeck Award for Cartoonist of the Year. When the award name was renamed the Reuben Award in 1954, all the prior winners were given Reuben statuettes.
- In 1995, the strip was one of 20 included in the Comic Strip Classics series of United States Postal Service commemorative postage stamps.

== Blondie in other media ==
=== Comic books ===
- Big Little Book series 17 issues, 1936-1949
- Ace Comics #1 Ace Comics — first appearance in comic book, also first appearance for Jungle Jim and Krazy Kat
- Blondie Feature Books David McKay Publications (1938–1947) #12-46
- Blondie Comics (...Monthly No. 16-141) David McKay Publications #1-15, Harvey Publications #16-163, King Features Syndicate #164-175, Charlton Comics #177-222 (Spring 1947-November 1976, No Issue #176)
- Chic Young's Dagwood Harvey Publications, (1950–1965), 140 issues
- Daisy and Her Pups (1951–1954), Harvey Publications, 18 issues
- Blondie & Dagwood Family (1963–1965), Harvey Publications, 4 issues
- Adventures of Blondie and Dagwood Associated Press (1956) 84 p., B&W
- Blondie Giant Comic Album King Comics, 1972
- Dagwood Splits the Atom! (1949), King Features, 1 issue, giveaway with King characters
- Blondie Comics Harvey Publications (1950 giveaway, 1962 giveaway, 1964 giveaway, New York State Department of Mental Hygiene giveaways (1950,1956,1961)

=== Books ===
- Blondie and Dagwood's Snapshot Clue, Whitman Publishing, 1943
- Blondie 100 Top Selected Laughs, David McKay Publications, 1944
- Bondie and Dagwood's Adventure In Magic, Whitman Publishing, 1944
- Blondie and Dagwood, World Publishing Company, 1945
- Blondie and Dagwood: A Novel Of The Great American Family, author: Lund, Helga, World Publishing Company, 1945
- Blondie's Cook Book, Bell Publications, 1947
- Blondie Book, Associated Press, Australia, 1953
- Blondie Coloring Book, Dell Publishing, 1954
- Blondie's Family (Treasure Book) King Features Syndicate, 1954
- Blondie Paint Book, David McKay Publications, circa 1955, 4 different issues
- 25 Years With Blondie, Simon & Schuster, 1958
- Leave It To Blondie, (a Little Square Book), King Features Syndicate, 1966
- Blondie Coloring Book, Saalfield Publishing, 1968
- Blondie: A Strip Book, Authorized Edition, Saalfield Publishing, 1968
- Blondie #1, Signet Books, 1968
- Blondie #2, Signet Books, 1968
- Blondie & Dagwood's America, Harper & Row, 1981, A. Baker (London), 1982
- Blondie (Comic Strip Preserves, Book 1), Blackthorne, 1986
- Blondie's Cook Book, Gramercy, 1996

=== Games ===
- Blondie Goes To Leisureland (1935) Westinghouse
- Blondie and Dagwood Interchangeable Blocks (1951) Gaston Manufacturing keen-o-puzzle

=== Film ===
Blondie was adapted into a long-running series of 28 low-budget theatrical B-features, produced by Columbia Pictures. Beginning with Blondie in 1938, the series lasted 12 years, through Beware of Blondie (1950). The two major roles were Penny Singleton as Blondie and Arthur Lake (whose first starring role was another comic strip character, Harold Teen) as Dagwood. Faithfulness to the comic strip was a major concern of the creators of the series. Little touches were added that were iconic to the strip, like the appearance of Dagwood's famous sandwiches—and the running gag of Dagwood colliding with the mailman amid a flurry of letters, which preceded the title sequence in almost every film.

Columbia was careful to maintain continuity, so each picture progressed from where the last one left off. Thus, the Bumstead children grew from toddlers to young adults onscreen. Larry Simms played the Bumsteads' son in all the films; his character was originally called Baby Dumpling, and later became Alexander. Marjorie Kent (born Marjorie Ann Mutchie) joined the series in 1943 as daughter Cookie. Daisy had pups in the 12th feature, Blondie for Victory (1942). Danny Mummert, who had originally been chosen to play Baby Dumpling, took the continuing role of wiseguy neighbor Alvin Fuddle. Rounding out the regular supporting cast, character actor Jonathan Hale played Dagwood's irascible boss, J.C. Dithers. Hale left the series in 1945 and was succeeded by Jerome Cowan as George M. Radcliffe in Blondie's Big Moment. In the last film, Beware of Blondie, the Dithers character returned, played by Edward Earle and shown from the back. The Bumsteads' neighbors, the Woodleys, did not appear in the series until Beware of Blondie. They were played by Emory Parnell and Isabel Withers.

In 1943, Columbia felt the series was slipping, and ended the string with It's a Great Life and Footlight Glamour, deliberately omitting Blondie from the titles to attract unwary moviegoers. After 14 Blondies, stars Singleton and Lake moved on to other productions. During their absence from the screen, Columbia heard from many exhibitors and fans who wanted them back. The studio reactivated the series, which ran another 14 films until discontinued permanently in 1950. Because some demand from movie theaters still existed, Columbia began reissuing the older films, beginning with the 1938 Blondie, and continued to release them in their original sequence well into the 1950s, when these were packaged for television by Columbia's video subsidiary Screen Gems.

- Blondie (1938)
- Blondie Meets the Boss (1939)
- Blondie Takes a Vacation (1939)
- Blondie Brings Up Baby (1939)
- Blondie on a Budget (1940)
- Blondie Has Servant Trouble (1940)
- Blondie Plays Cupid (1940)
- Blondie Goes Latin (1941)
- Blondie in Society (1941)
- Blondie Goes to College (1942)
- Blondie's Blessed Event (1942)
- Blondie for Victory (1942)
- It's a Great Life (1943)
- Footlight Glamour (1943)
- Leave It to Blondie (1945)
- Life with Blondie (1946)
- Blondie's Lucky Day (1946)
- Blondie Knows Best (1946)
- Blondie's Big Moment (1947)
- Blondie's Holiday (1947)
- Blondie in the Dough (1947)
- Blondie's Anniversary (1947)
- Blondie's Reward (1948)
- Blondie's Secret (1948)
- Blondie's Big Deal (1949)
- Blondie Hits the Jackpot (1949)
- Blondie's Hero (1950)
- Beware of Blondie (1950)

=== Radio ===
Singleton and Lake reprised their film roles for radio; the Blondie radio program had a long run spanning several networks. Initially a 1939 summer replacement program for The Eddie Cantor Show (sponsored by Camel Cigarettes), Blondie was heard on CBS until June 1944, when it moved briefly to NBC. Returning to CBS later that year, Blondie continued there under a new sponsor (Colgate-Palmolive) until June 1949. In its final season, the series was heard on ABC from October 1949 to July 1950.

=== Television ===
==== Live-action ====
Two Blondie TV sitcoms have been produced to date, each lasting only one season.

- The first ran on NBC for 26 episodes in 1957, with Lake reprising his film and radio role and Pamela Britton as Blondie.
- The second, broadcast on CBS in the 1968–69 season, had Patricia Harty and Will Hutchins in the lead roles and veteran comic actor Jim Backus portraying Mr. Dithers.

==== Animation ====
Blondie and Dagwood were featured prominently in the cartoon movie Popeye Meets the Man Who Hated Laughter, which debuted on October 7, 1972. The movie was a part of The ABC Saturday Superstar Movie series.

Blondie and Dagwood made a brief animated appearance in The Fantastic Funnies, a TV special focusing on newspaper comics that aired on CBS in 1980. They appeared in the beginning, singing a song to host Loni Anderson with other comic strip characters. Later on, after a short interview with Dean Young and Jim Raymond (who was drawing the strip at the time), they featured a short sequence where Blondie urges a reluctant Dagwood to get a haircut. The animation was produced by Bill Melendez Productions. Dagwood also makes a cameo appearance in Garfield Gets Real.

An animated cartoon TV special featuring the characters was made in 1987 by Marvel Productions (who had earlier collaborated with King Features for the animated series Defenders of the Earth, starring King Feature's adventure characters) and shown on CBS, with a second special, Second Wedding Workout, telecast in 1989. Blondie was voiced by Loni Anderson, Dagwood by Frank Welker. Both animated specials are available on the fourth DVD of the Advantage Cartoon Mega Pack. Both of these specials were paired with other comic strip-based specials; the first special was paired with a special based on Cathy, the second one was paired with Hägar the Horrible. In Video (VHS) in UK: Leisureview Video in 1989.

In a 1989 episode of the animated series Muppet Babies, entitled Comic Caper, Blondie and Dagwood make a cameo appearance. Blondie tells Dagwood that he is going to be late for work. As Dagwood rushes to the door, he knocks into the Muppet Babies, who have fallen into the world of the Blondie comic strip. Baby Kermit and Baby Piggy also parodied Blondie and Dagwood in one scene. The Muppet Babies series was produced by Marvel Productions, the producers of the 1987 and 1989 Blondie specials, and was also aired on the same network, CBS.

== Licensing and merchandise ==
Over the years, Blondie characters have been merchandised as dolls, coloring books, toys, salt and pepper shakers, paint sets, paper doll cutouts, coffee mugs, cookie jars, neckties, lunchboxes, puzzles, games, Halloween costumes, Christmas ornaments, music boxes, refrigerator magnets, lapel pinbacks, greeting cards, and other products. In 2001, Dark Horse Comics issued two collectible figures of Dagwood and Blondie as part of their line of Classic Comic Characters—statues No. 19 and 20 respectively.

The Dagwood Sandwiches featured in the strip are a recurring licensing opportunity on their own. A counter-service restaurant called Blondie's opened at Universal's Islands of Adventure in May 1999, serving a traditional Dagwood-style sandwich. In fact, Blondie's bills itself as "Home of the Dagwood Sandwich". Lunch meats featuring Dagwood can be purchased at various grocery stores. In Canada, the Sobeys supermarket chain offers a family-sized sandwich called the Dagwood Sandwich.

== Reprints and further reading ==

Comic strip collections

- Blondie #1 by Chic Young (1968) Signet
- Blondie #2 by Chic Young (1968) Signet
- Blondie (No. 1) by Dean Young and Jim Raymond (1976) Tempo
- Blondie (No. 2) by Dean Young and Jim Raymond (1977) Tempo
- The Best of Blondie by Dean Young, et al. (1977) Tempo
- Blondie: Celebration Edition by Dean Young and Jim Raymond (1980) Tempo
- Blondie (No. 3) by Dean Young and Jim Raymond (1982) Tempo
- Blondie (No. 4): A Family Album by Dean Young and Mike Gersher (1982) Tempo
- Blondie: More Surprises! by Dean Young and Mike Gersher (1983) Tempo
- Blondie Book 1 (1986) by Dean Young and Stan Drake (1986) Blackthorne
- Blondie: Mr Dithers, I Demand a Raise!! by Dean Young and Jim Raymond (1989) Tor
- Blondie: But Blondie, I'm Taking a Bath!! by Dean Young and Jim Raymond (1990) Tor
- Blondie: The Bumstead Family History by Dean Young and Melena Ryzik (2007) Thomas Nelson Pub. ISBN 1-4016-0322-X
- Blondie: Volume 1 by Chic Young (2010) The Library of American Comics ISBN 1-60010-740-0 (First of a projected series)
- Blondie: Volume 2 by Chic Young (2012) The Library of American Comics ISBN 1-61377-102-9

Related fiction

- Blondie and Dagwood in Footlight Folly (1947) Dell (An original paperback novel, not illustrated. Unnumbered, but usually considered part of Dell's mapback series)
- Blondie's Family (1954) Treasure/Wonder Book (a full-color storybook for children)

History

- Blondie & Dagwood's America (1981) Harper & Row ISBN 0-06-090908-0 (Dean Young and Rick Marschall's collaboration, providing an historical background of the strip)
- Blondie Goes to Hollywood: The Blondie Comic Strip in Films, Radio & Television by Carol Lynn Scherling (2010) BearManor Media ISBN 978-1-59393-401-9
