= Mike Gersher =

American cartoonist

Mike Gersher was formerly an artist on the Blondie comic strip. He started being credited as the head artist in late December 1981, after the death of the long serving Jim Raymond. Gersher had assisted Raymond for about seventeen years, originally as a trainee assistant but later becoming responsible for complete artwork. They met in 1963 after Gersher won a national cartooning contest. Raymond's health began to fail around 1979, and it is almost certain that Gersher was handling the majority of the strip from about April 1981. He began signing the strip on 28 December of that year.

Gersher's early solo strips bore a close resemblance to those of Jim Raymond, albeit with a slightly looser drawing style. Although few exact details are known, Gersher's time as lead artist did not run smoothly. He had to rely heavily on assistants, notably future head Blondie artist Denis Lebrun, who was soon brought in to ink backgrounds and improve the lettering.

In 1984 Gersher was replaced by Stan Drake, although Drake did not begin to sign the strip until some time in 1985.
