= Jim Raymond =

American cartoonist (1917–1981)

- Jim Raymond
- Born: James Crossley Raymond; February 25, 1917 Riverside, Connecticut
- Died: October 14, 1981 (aged 64) Boynton Beach, Florida
- Areas: Cartoonist, Artist
- Notable works: Blondie

James Crossley Raymond (February 25, 1917 – October 14, 1981) was an American comic strip artist and the younger brother of Flash Gordon artist Alex Raymond. He was also the great-uncle of actors Matt Dillon and Kevin Dillon.

== Biography ==
Born in Riverside, Connecticut and raised in New Rochelle, New York, Raymond's first cartoons were published in his high school newspaper. In 1935, he started as an assistant on the Blondie comic strip, mostly as a replacement for his brother, who had been working on Blondie for three years before leaving to start his own strips.

Initially, Raymond's responsibilities were quite minor, but by 1937, when the first son of Blondie creator Chic Young died of jaundice, Raymond was considered experienced enough to take over both writing and drawing the strip for a year.

In 1938, Chic Young returned from his sabbatical, resuming his place as the main writer of Blondie. Raymond continued to play a major role in creating the artwork, in addition to a short stint assisting his brother Alex on Jungle Jim around 1944. In 1950, due to Chic's diminishing eyesight, Raymond permanently became the lead artist of Blondie and began to develop the distinctive style that the strip uses to this day.

Chic Young died in 1973 and his son Dean, who had been assisting with the writing for about ten years, took over as head writer. Raymond continued as the artist and began sharing a byline credit with Dean soon after.

Raymond's health began to fail in 1979, and he died in late 1981 from cancer. After his death, he was succeeded by Mike Gersher, who had assisted him for about 17 years. All Blondie artists since that time have stuck closely to the style that Jim Raymond refined, with small modifications to keep props and clothing styles contemporary.
